= Cephalonia =

Largest of the Ionian Islands, Greece

Cephalonia Περιφερειακή ενότητα Κεφαλληνίας
- Regional unit
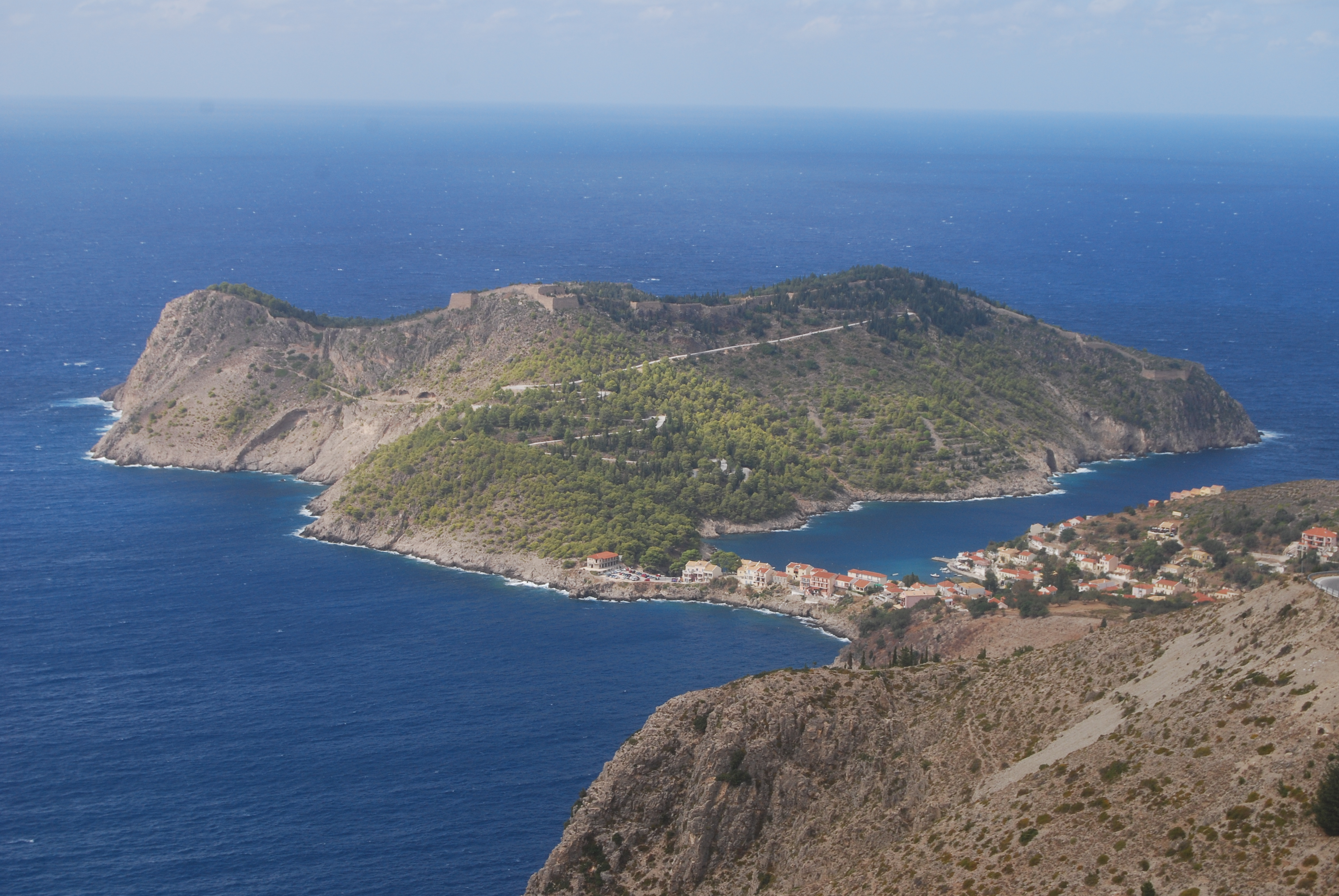
- View of Asos

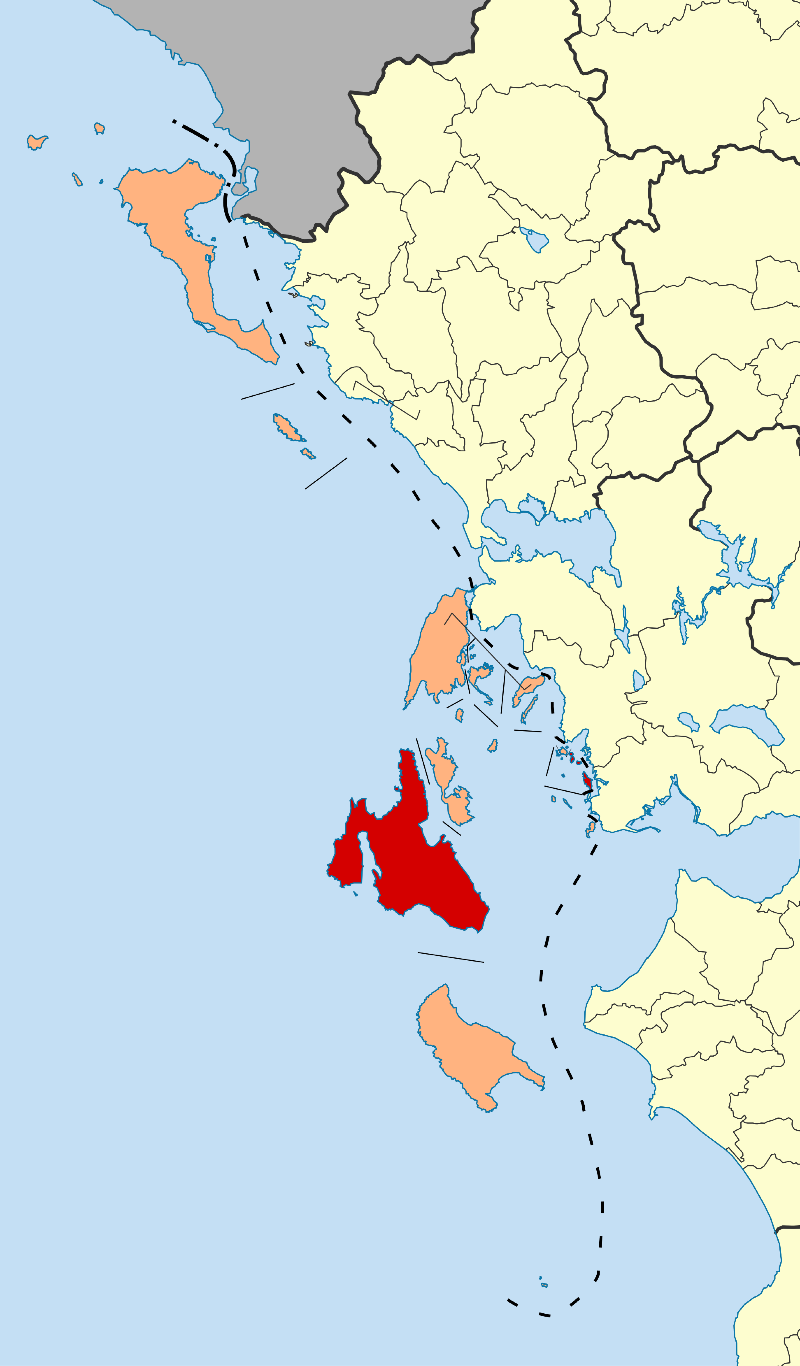
- Cephalonia within the Ionian Islands

- Location within Greece
- Coordinates: 38°15′54″N 20°33′09″E
- Country: Greece
- Administrative region: Ionian Islands
- Seat: Argostoli

Area
  - Total: 773 km^{2} (298 sq mi)
- Elevation: 1,628 m (5,341 ft)

Population (2021)
  - Total: 36,064
  - Density: 46.7/km^{2} (121/sq mi)
- Time zone: UTC+2 (EET)
  - Summer (DST): UTC+3 (EEST)
- Postal code: 280 xx
- Area code: 267x0
- Vehicle registration: ΚΕ
- Website: www.kefallonia.gov.gr

Kefalonia or Cephalonia (Greek: Κεφαλονιά [kefaloˈɲa]), formerly also known as Kefallinia or Kephallenia (Κεφαλληνία), is the largest of the Ionian Islands in western Greece and the sixth-largest island in Greece after Crete, Euboea, Lesbos, Rhodes and Chios. It is also a separate regional unit of the Ionian Islands region. It was a former Latin Catholic diocese Kefalonia–Zakynthos (Cefalonia–Zante) and short-lived titular see as just Kefalonia. The largest cities of Cephalonia are Argostoli and Lixouri.

== History ==
=== Antiquity ===
==== Legend ====
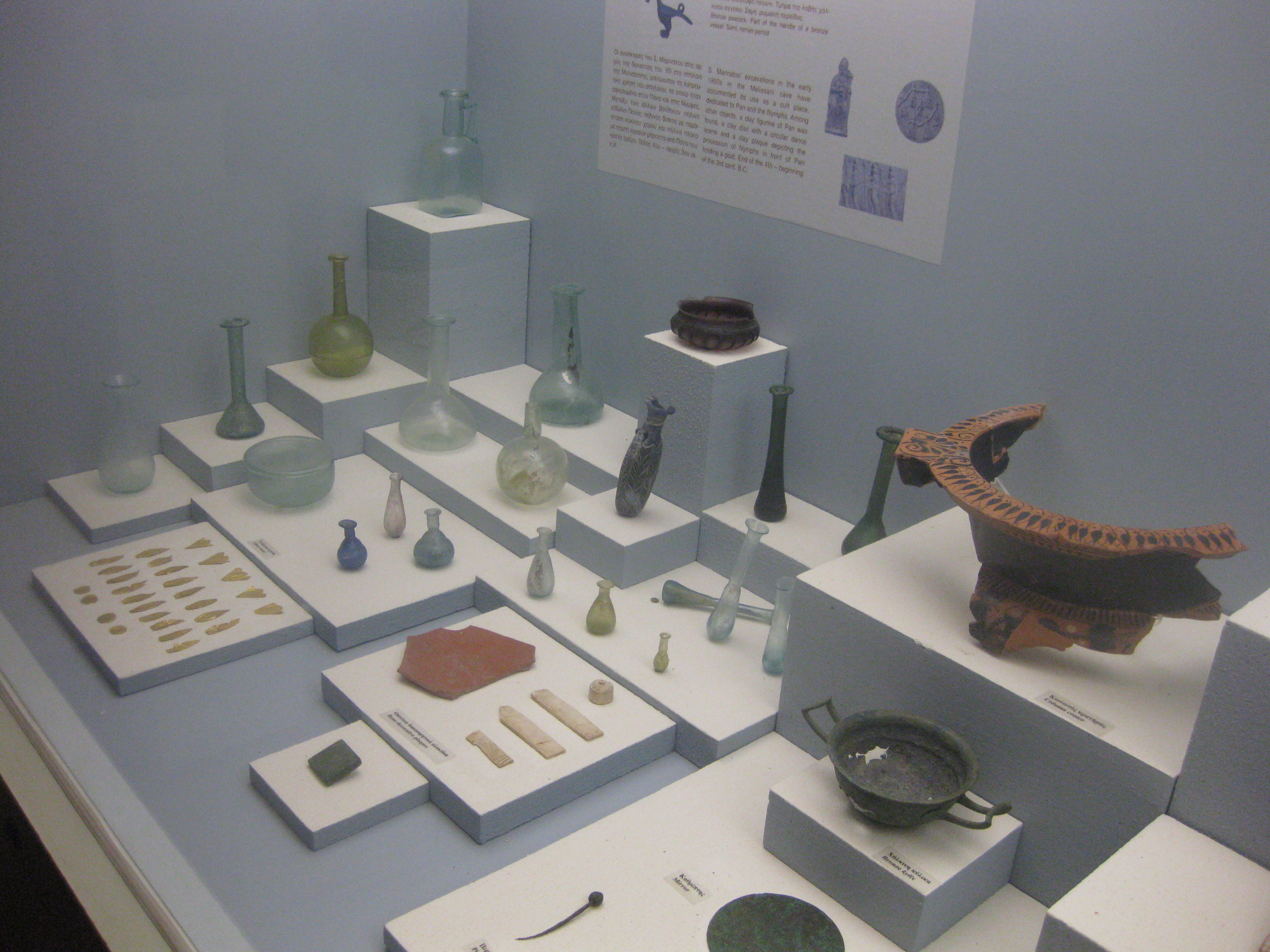
Excavations from Melissani in the Archaeological Museum of Argostoli

An aition explaining the name of Cephallenia and reinforcing its cultural connections with Athens associates the island with the mythological figure of Cephalus, who helped Amphitryon of Mycenae in a war against the Taphians and Teleboans. He was rewarded with the island of Same, which thereafter came to be known as Cephallenia.

Kefalonia has also been suggested as the Homeric Ithaca, the home of Odysseus, rather than the smaller island bearing this name today. Robert Bittlestone, in his book Odysseus Unbound, has suggested that Paliki, now a peninsula of Cephalonia, was a separate island during the late Bronze Age, and it may be this which Homer was referring to when he described Ithaca. A project that started in the summer of 2007 and lasted three years has examined this possibility.

Kefalonia is also referenced in relation to the goddess Britomartis, as the location where she is said to have 'received divine honours from the inhabitants under the name of Laphria'.

==== Archaic and Classical Periods ====
From at least the 6th century BC, the island was dominated by four city-states (poleis): Pale (modern Lixouri), Cranii (mod. Argostoli), Same (mod. Sami) and Pronnoi. All four minted their own coins, as well as building monumental temples and fortifications, both in the cities themselves and in the surrounding countryside. Ancient writers generally paid little attention to the island throughout antiquity, but there are some notable references, and it seems that the Kefalonian cities were involved in developments and events across the wider Greek world.

A certain Melampous, from Kefalonia, won the Lyre and Song contest at the Pythian Games at Delphi in 582 BC. 200 hoplites from Pale fought alongside other Greeks against the Persians in the decisive battle at Plataea, and all four Kefalonian cities allied with Athens during the Peloponnesian War. The island was of strategic value to the Athenians, as it lies close to the entry to the Bay of Corinth. The Corinthians attempted, unsuccessfully, to attack Krane in 431 BC, and, 10 years later, Athens settled a group of Spartan deserters on the island. Finally, a group of Kefalonian soldiers were recruited by the Athenian general Demosthenes as part of the ill-fated Sicilian Expedition in 415-413 BC.

According to Strabo, on Mount Ainos there was a sanctuary dedicated to Zeus Ainesios. This temple was also mentioned by Hesiod, and German, French and English explorers in the 18th and 19th century found its remnants.

==== Hellenistic and Roman Periods ====
The Kefalonian cities retained close ties with Athens after the end of the Peloponnesian War, despite the Spartan victory. Athenian influence, including heavy direct taxation in the 4th century BC, may have been a stimulus for a new planned and fortified town at Same, which increasingly seems to have dominated the smaller polis of Pronnoi.

The Kefalonian cities once again contributed troops and ships to broader Greek military events, this time Alexander the Great's invasion and conquest of the Persian Empire. In the subsequent centuries, the island was drawn ever close to the Aetolian League. As a result, it was invaded by the Macedonian king Philip V in 218 BC and then by the Roman republic in 189 BC, who conquered Same after a protracted siege. From then onwards, Kefalonia lost its strategic importance and so declined in social and economic terms. Archaeologically, the Roman period is dominated by lavish villas on the coasts, contrasted with little activity in the old towns. The ancient links to Athens seem to have remained strong, as the emperor Hadrian gifted the island to the city during his reign.

=== Middle Ages ===
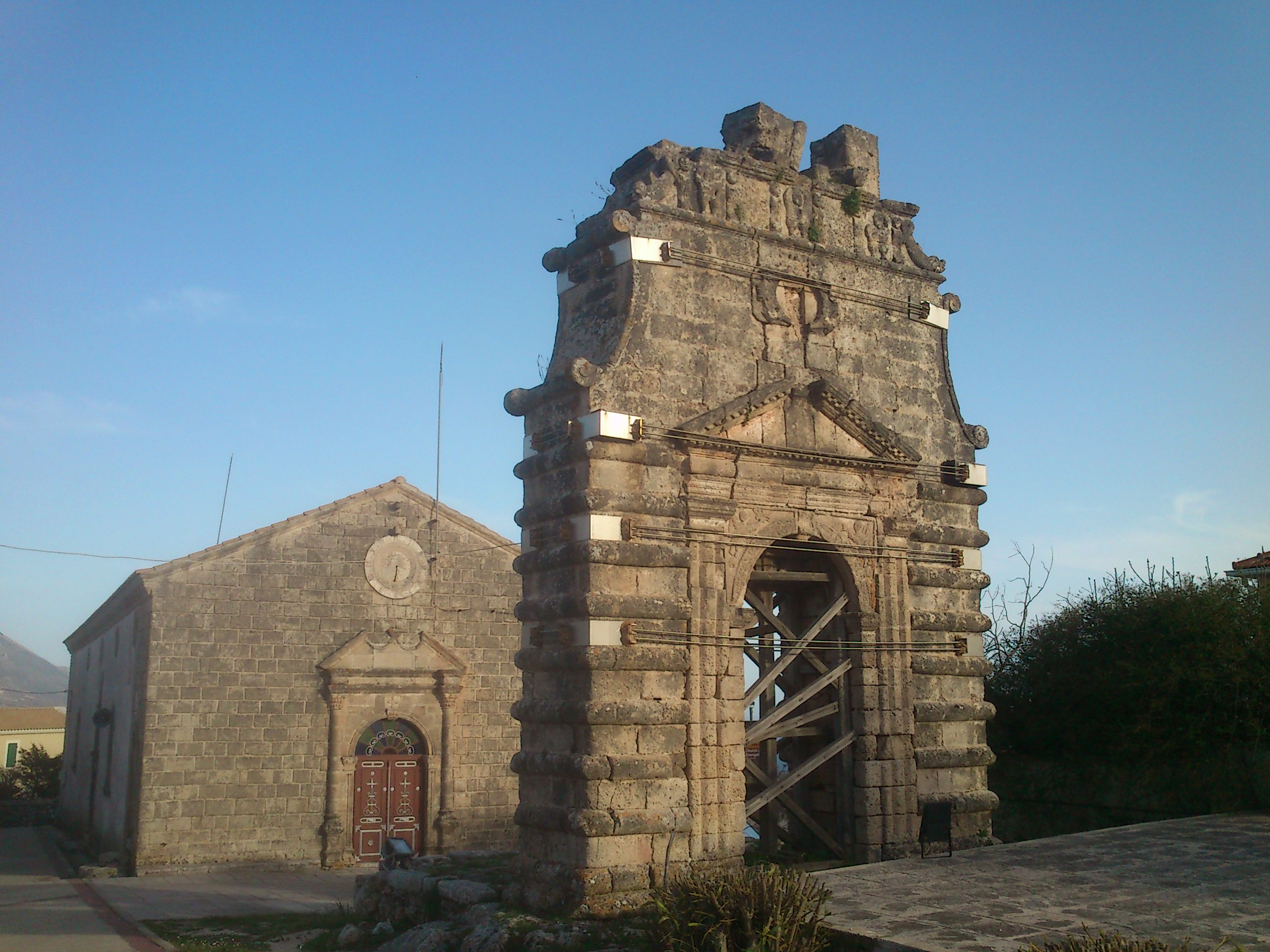
Evangelistria Church, St. George's castle.

In the late Roman Empire, Cephalonia was part of the Roman province of Achaea. Ecclesiastically it was a suffragan of the Metropolis of Nicopolis (the eparchy of Epirus I). The four ancient cities of the island survived into late antiquity, with Sami probably as the island's capital.

Following the loss of the bulk of Italy and the expansion of the Muslims into the Western Mediterranean, the island became a strategically important base of operations for the Byzantine Empire in the area, blocking Muslim raids into the Adriatic and serving as a bridge for expeditions in Italy. Already from the 8th century, it was the centre of the namesake theme of Cephallenia. At the same time, the capital was moved to the Castle of Saint George, a more well-protected site in the island's interior. Mardaites were resettled in Cephalonia to serve as marines, and political prisoners were sometimes exiled there.

The loss of Byzantine Italy in 1071 diminished Cephalonia's importance, and its administration passed from a military strategos to a civilian judge (krites). Its main city was besieged by the Italo-Normans in 1085, and the Venetians plundered the island in 1126. Cephalonia was captured during the Third Norman invasion of the Balkans in 1185, and it became part of the County palatine of Cephalonia and Zakynthos under the Kingdom of Sicily and Venetian suzerainty, until its last Count Leonardo III Tocco was defeated and the island conquered by the Ottoman Empire in 1479.

=== Venetian rule ===
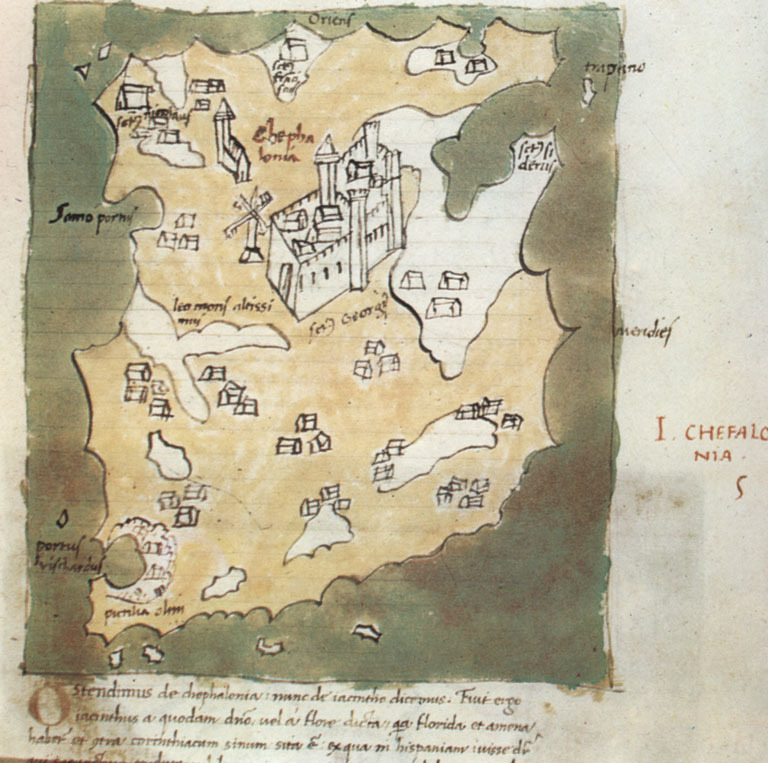
A 1420 map of the island.

Turkish rule lasted only until 1500, when Cephalonia was captured by a Spanish-Venetian army, a rare Venetian success in the Second Ottoman–Venetian War. In the aftermath of the Venetian conquest, the island received an influx of civilian and military (stradioti) refugees from the lost Venetian fortresses of Modon and Coron, as well as many colonists from the Venetian-ruled island of Crete.

From then on, Cephalonia and Ithaca remained part of the Stato da Mar of the Venetian Republic until its very end, following the fate of the Ionian islands, completed by the capture of Lefkas from the Turks in 1684. The Treaty of Campoformio dismantling the Venetian Republic awarded the Ionian Islands to France, a French expeditionary force on ships captured in Venice, taking control of the islands in June 1797.

Because of the liberal situation on the island, the Venetian governor Marcantonio Giustinian (1516–1571) printed Hebrew books and exported them to the whole eastern Mediterranean. In 1596, the Venetians built the Assos Castle, one of Cephalonia's main tourist attractions today. From the 16th to the 18th centuries, the island was one of the largest exporters of currants in the world, with Zakynthos, and owned a large shipping fleet, even commissioning ships from the Danzig shipyard. Its towns and villages were mostly built high on hilltops, to prevent attacks from raiding parties of pirates that sailed the Ionian Sea during the 1820s.

=== French, Ionian state period and British rule ===
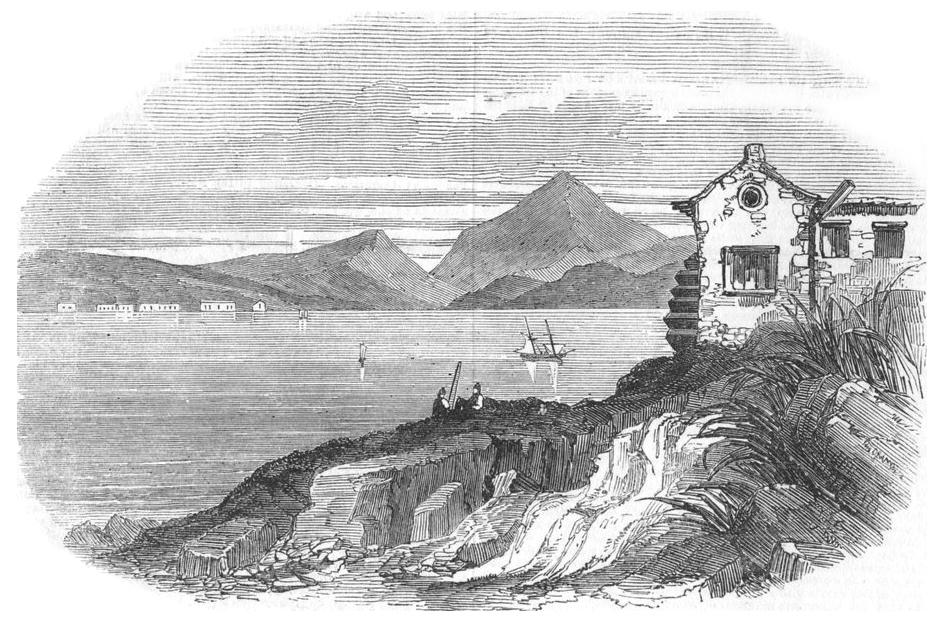
The sea mills at the bay of Argostoli (1849) were a natural curiosity in the 19th century. Mount Ainos in the background.

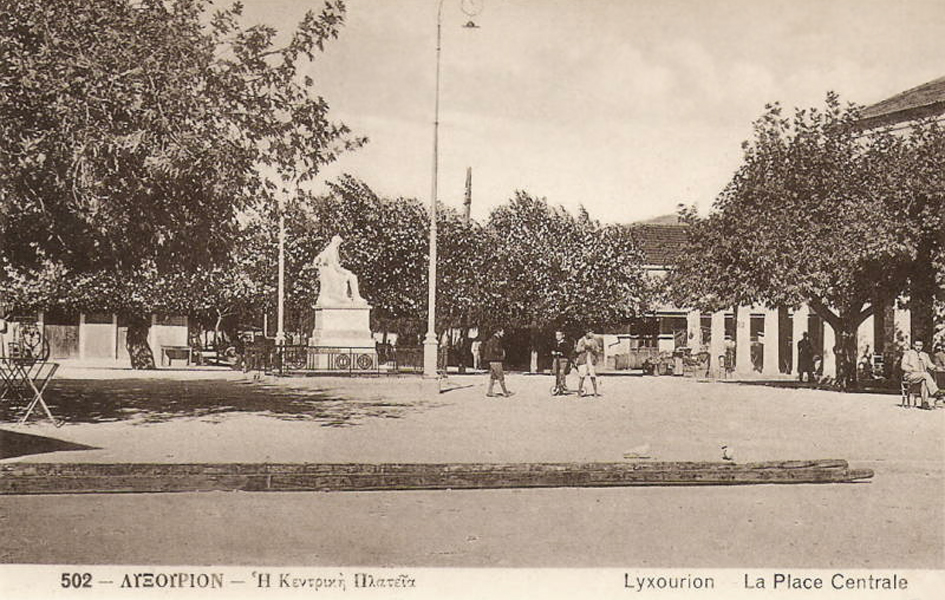
The central square of Lixouri, 1910.

Venice was conquered by France in 1797, and Cephalonia, along with the other Ionian Islands, became part of the French département of Ithaque.

In the following year, 1798, the French were forced to yield the Ionian Islands to a combined Russian and Turkish fleet. From 1799 to 1807, Cephalonia was part of the Septinsular Republic, nominally under the sovereignty of the Ottoman Empire, but protected by Russia.

By the Treaty of Tilsit in 1807, the Ionian Islands were ceded back to France, which remained in control of Cephalonia until 1809. In 1809, the British established a blockade on the Ionian Islands as part of their conflict with France, and in September of that year, they hoisted the Union Flag above the castle of Zakynthos. Cephalonia and Ithaca soon surrendered, and the British installed provisional governments. The Treaty of Paris in 1815 recognised the United States of the Ionian Islands and decreed that it become a British protectorate. Colonel Charles Philippe de Bosset became provisional governor between 1810 and 1814. During this period, he was credited with achieving many public works, including the Drapano Bridge, which later became known as the De Bosset Bridge, over the bay of Argostoli.

A few years later, Greek nationalist groups started to form. Although their energy in the early years was directed to supporting the Greeks in the revolution against the Ottoman Empire, it soon started to turn towards the British. By 1848, calls for enosis with Greece were gaining strength, and there were rebellions against British rule in Argostoli and Lixouri, which led to some relaxation in the laws and to freedom of the press. Union with Greece was now a declared aim, and in 1849, as revolution was sweeping across Europe, a growing restlessness resulted in another rebellion against the British state, which was suppressed by the island's governor, Sir Henry George Ward when 21 people were hanged, several were shot and hundreds were flogged by the cat-o-nine-tails.

Cephalonia, along with the other islands, was transferred to Greece in 1864 as a gesture of goodwill when the British-supported Prince William of Denmark became King George the First of the Hellenes.

=== Union with Greece ===
In 1864, Cephalonia, together with all the other Ionian Islands, became a full member of the Greek state.

=== World War II ===
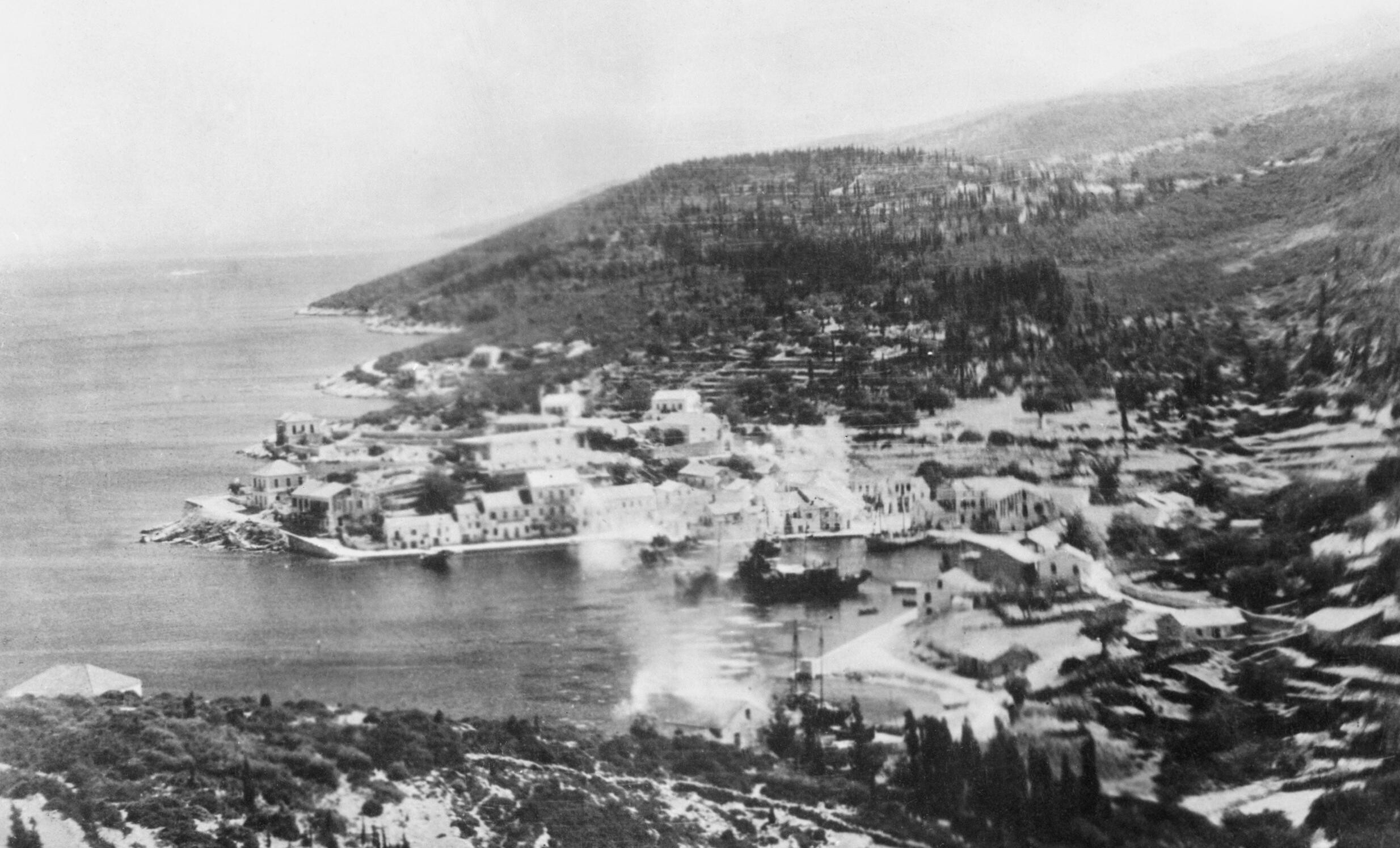
Fiskardo in the 1940s.

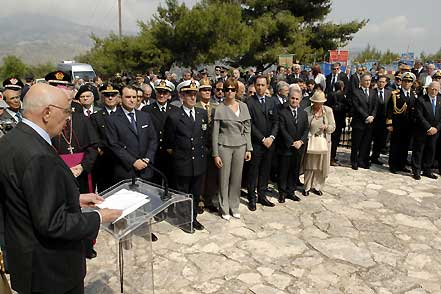
The Italian President Giorgio Napolitano in Cephalonia during remembrance ceremonies in honour of the soldiers of the Massacre of the Acqui Division.

In World War II, the island was occupied by Axis forces. Until late 1943, the occupying force was predominantly Italian, the 33rd Infantry Division Acqui plus Navy personnel totalled 12,000 men, but about 2,000 troops from Germany were also present. The island was largely spared the fighting until the armistice with Italy concluded by the Allies in September 1943. Confusion followed on the island, as the Italians were hoping to return home, but German forces did not want the Italians' munitions to be used eventually against them; Italian forces were hesitant to turn over weapons for the same reason. As German reinforcements headed to the island, the Italians dug in and, eventually, after a referendum among the soldiers as to surrender or battle, they fought against the new German invasion. The fighting came to a head at the siege of Argostoli, where the Italians held out. Ultimately, the Germans prevailed, taking full control of the island.

Approximately five thousand of the nine thousand surviving Italian soldiers were executed in reprisal by the German forces. The book Captain Corelli's Mandolin by Louis de Bernières, which was later made into a film, is based on this event. While the war ended in central Europe in 1945, Cephalonia remained in a state of conflict due to the Greek Civil War. Peace returned to Greece and the island in 1949.

=== Earthquake of 1953 ===
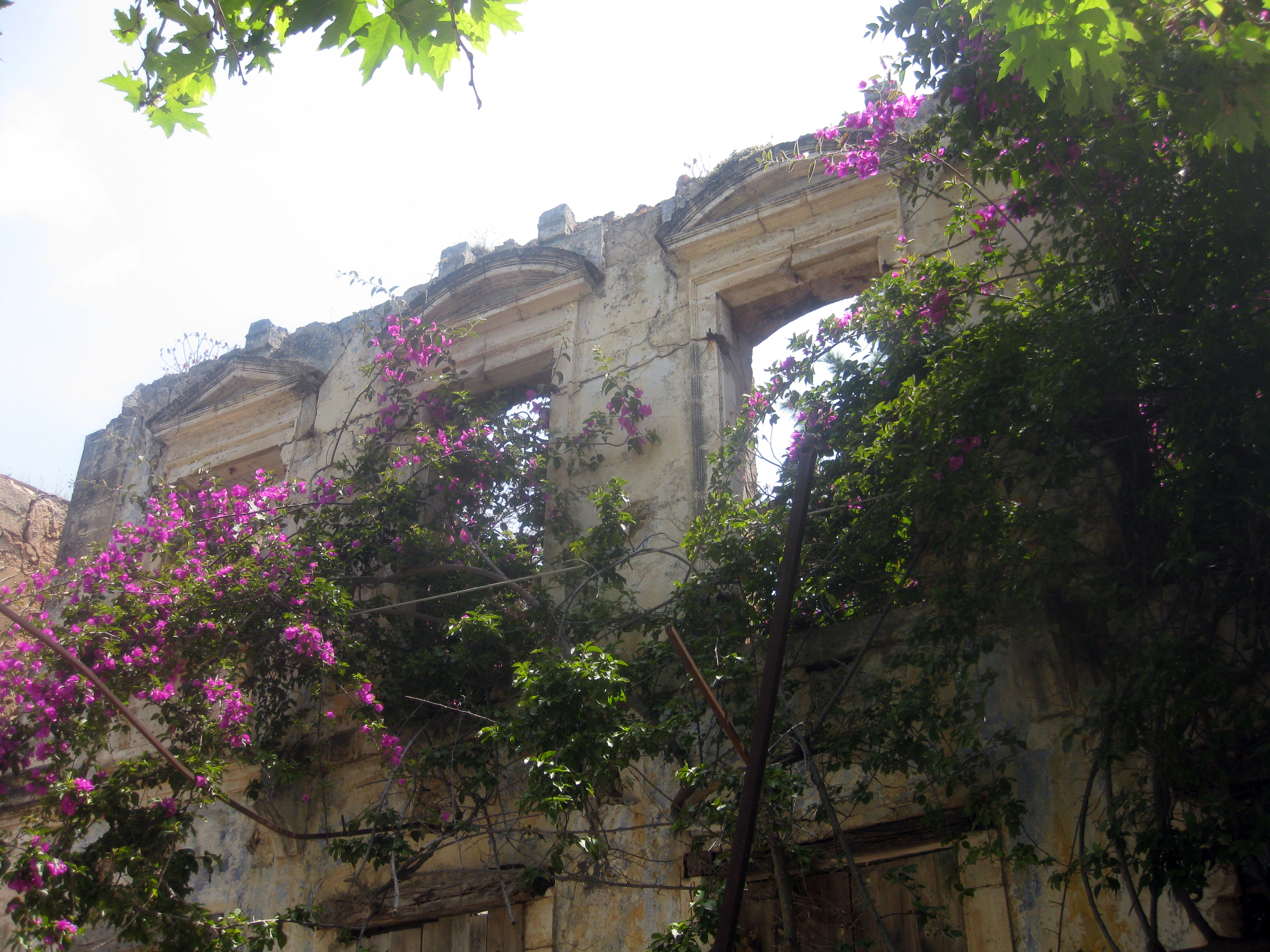
Some ruins of the 1953 earthquake are still visible.

Cephalonia lies just to the southeast of a major active fault zone, where the Eurasian Plate meets the Aegean Plate at a transform boundary. The island itself is affected by a series of active thrust faults, which are responsible for the continuing uplift.

A series of four earthquakes hit the island in August 1953 and caused major destruction, with virtually every house on the island destroyed. The third and most destructive of the quakes took place on 12 August 1953 at 09:24 UTC (11:24 local time), with a magnitude of 6.8 on the Moment magnitude scale. Its epicentre was directly south of the southern tip of Cephalonia, and caused the entire island to be raised 60 cm (24 in) higher, where it remains, with evidence in water marks on rocks around the coastline.

The 1953 Ionian earthquake disaster caused huge destruction, with only regions in the north escaping the heaviest tremors and houses there remaining intact. Damage was estimated to run into tens of millions of dollars, equivalent to billions of drachmas, but the real damage to the economy occurred when residents left the island. The majority of the population left the island soon after, seeking a new life elsewhere.

=== Recent history ===
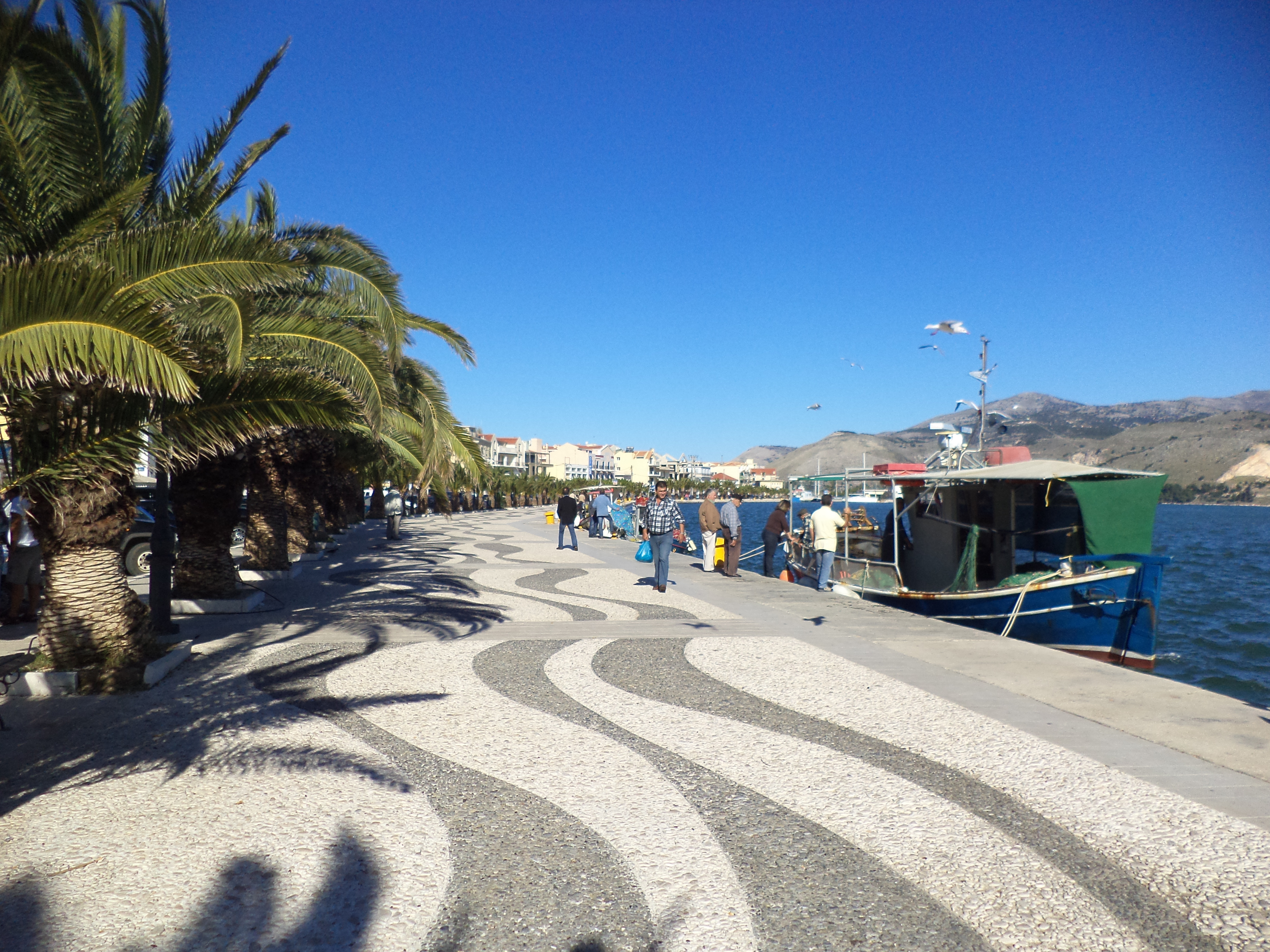
Promenade of Argostoli

The forest fire of the 1990s caused damage to the island's forests and bushes, especially a small scar north of Troianata, and a large area of damage extending from Kateleios north to west of Tzanata, ruining about 30 square kilometres (12 sq mi) of forest and bushes and resulting in the loss of some properties. The forest fire scar was visible for some years.

In mid-November 2003, an earthquake measuring 5.3 on the Richter magnitude scale caused minor damage to business, residential property, and other buildings in and near Argostoli. The damage was around €1,000,000.

On the morning of 20 September 2005, an early-morning earthquake shook the south-western part of the island, especially near Lixouri and nearby villages. The earthquake measured 4.9 on the Richter magnitude scale, and its epicentre was located off the island. Service vehicles took care of the area, and no damage was reported. From 24 to 26 January 2006, a major snowstorm blanketed the entire island, causing extensive blackouts. The island was recently struck yet again by another forest fire in the south of the island, beginning on 18 July 2007 during an unusual heatwave, and spreading slowly. Firefighters, along with helicopters and planes, battled the blaze for some days, and the spectacle frightened residents in that area of the island.

In 2011, the eight former municipalities of the island lost their independence to form one united municipality. After losing its role as the capital of the island in the 19th century, Lixouri also lost its role as the seat of a municipality after 500 years. The Technological Educational Institute of the Ionian Islands closed one faculty in Lixouri and one in Argostoli.

In January 2014, an earthquake measuring 5.9 on the Richter magnitude scale left at least seven injured. There are reports of minor injuries and some property damage," said the Foreign Office on its website. "The airport remains operational, but there may be some disruption to port services."

== Archaeology ==
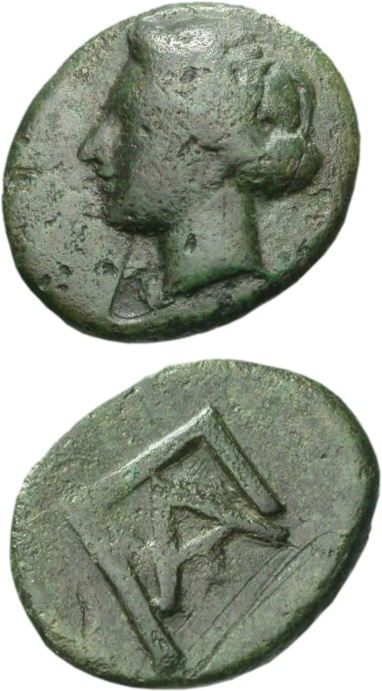
Coins from Pale/Pali, the ancient town north of Lixouri.

In the southwestern portion of the island, in the area of Leivatho, an ongoing archaeological field survey by the Irish Institute at Athens has discovered dozens of sites with dates ranging from the Palaeolithic to the Venetian period.

Archaeological finds go back to 40,000 BP. The Mycenaean era, from approximately 1500 BC to 1100 BC, contains. The archaeological museum in Cephalonia's capital, although small, is of great importance due to its exhibits from this era.

The most important archaeological discovery in Cephalonia (and indeed in Greece) of recent decades is that, in 1991, of the Mycenaean Tholos tomb at the outskirts of Tzanata, near Poros in southeastern Cephalonia (former Municipality of Elios-Pronni) in a setting of olive trees, cypresses, and oaks. The tomb was erected around 1300 BC; kings and highly ranked officials were buried in such tombs during the Mycenaean period. It is the largest tholos tomb yet found in northwestern Greece, and was excavated by archaeologist Lazaros Kolonas. The size of the tomb, the nature of the burial offerings found there, and its well-chosen position point to the existence of an important Mycenaean town in the vicinity.

In late 2006, a Roman grave complex was uncovered as the foundation of a new hotel was being excavated in Fiskardo. The remains date to the period between the 2nd century BC and the 4th century AD. Archaeologists described it as the most important find of its kind in the Ionian Islands. Inside the complex, five burial sites were found, including a large vaulted tomb and a stone coffin, along with gold earrings and rings, gold leaves that may have been attached to ceremonial clothing, glass and ceramic pots, bronze artefacts decorated with masks, a bronze lock, and bronze coins. The tomb had escaped the attention of grave robbers and remained undisturbed for thousands of years. When the tomb was opened, the stone door easily swung on its stone hinges. A Roman theatre was discovered very near the tomb, so well preserved that the metal joints between the seats were still intact.

A dissertation published in 1987 claims that Paul the Apostle, on his way from Palestine to Rome in 59 AD, was shipwrecked and confined for three months not on Malta but on Cephalonia.

According to Clement of Alexandria, the island had the largest community of Carpocratians, an early Gnostic Christian sect, because Carpocrates lived on the island.

== Population: historical evolution ==
In the ancient period, the people lived in four cities on the island. Cranii, Sami (or Samos), Pale and Pronnoi (Proni) formed a federation called "tetrapolis".

In more recent times, the population reached 70,000 in 1896, but declined gradually in the 20th century. The great 1953 Ionian earthquake forced many people to leave the island. Many of those who left moved to Patras or Athens, or emigrated to America and Australia, following relatives who had left the island decades before. In the same period, people from poorer areas of Greece, such as Epirus and Thrace, came to the island. The population has hovered between 35,000 and 42,000 since then; in the 2011 census, it was 35,801.

Year	Population
1879	68,321
1896	70,077
1920	55,030
1940	58,437
1961	39,793
1981	27,649
2001	34,544
2021	36,064

Most of the indigenous people of Cephalonia have surnames ending in "-atos", such as the Alexatos (Greek: Αλεξάτος) families, and almost every settlement on the island has a name ending in "-ata", such as Metaxata, Chavriata, Frangata, Lourdata, Favata, Poulata, Delaportata, and others.

== Ecclesiastical history ==
In 1222, the Frankish Crusaders established the Diocese of Kefalonia–Zakynthos (Cefalonia–Zante in Curiate Italian), which survived their rule and even the Turks. In 1919, the residential see was suppressed but immediately transformed into a titular bishopric of Kefalonia (Cefalonia in Italian). The territory and title were merged into the Metropolitan Archdiocese of Corfu–Zakynthos–Kefalonia. In 1921, this was also suppressed, never having had an incumbent.

== Geography ==
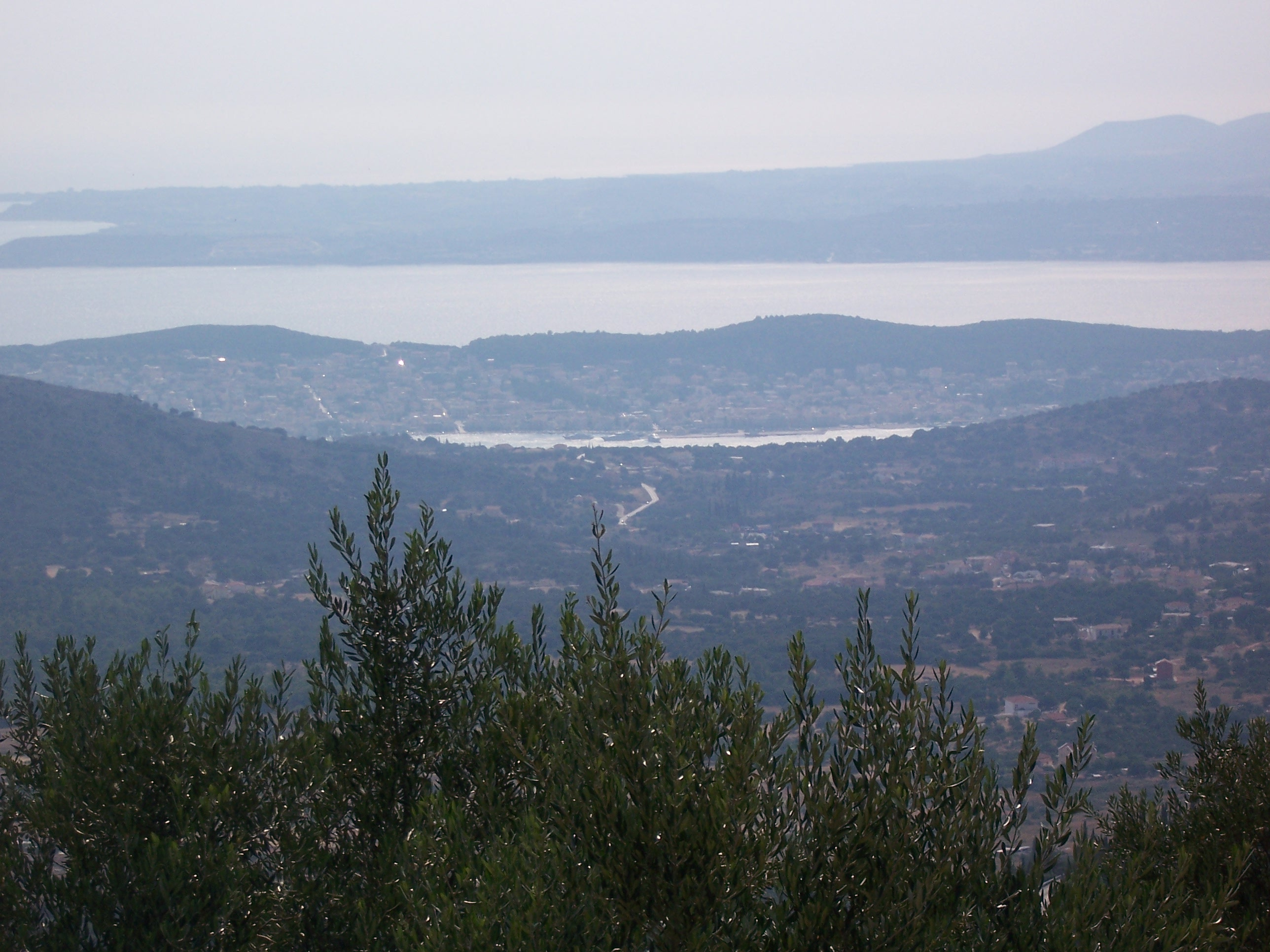
Argostoli and Lixouri from the mountains.

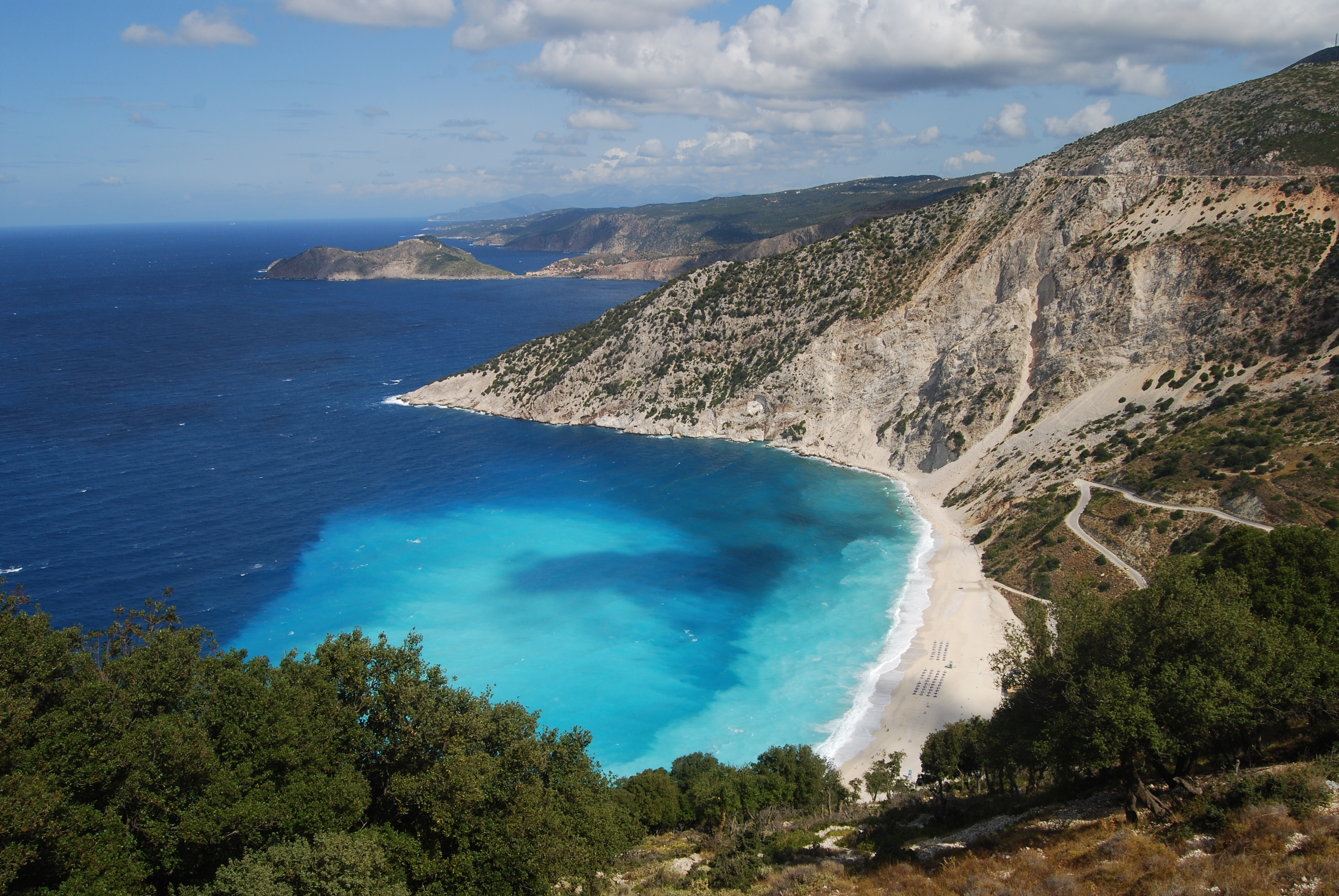
Myrtos Beach

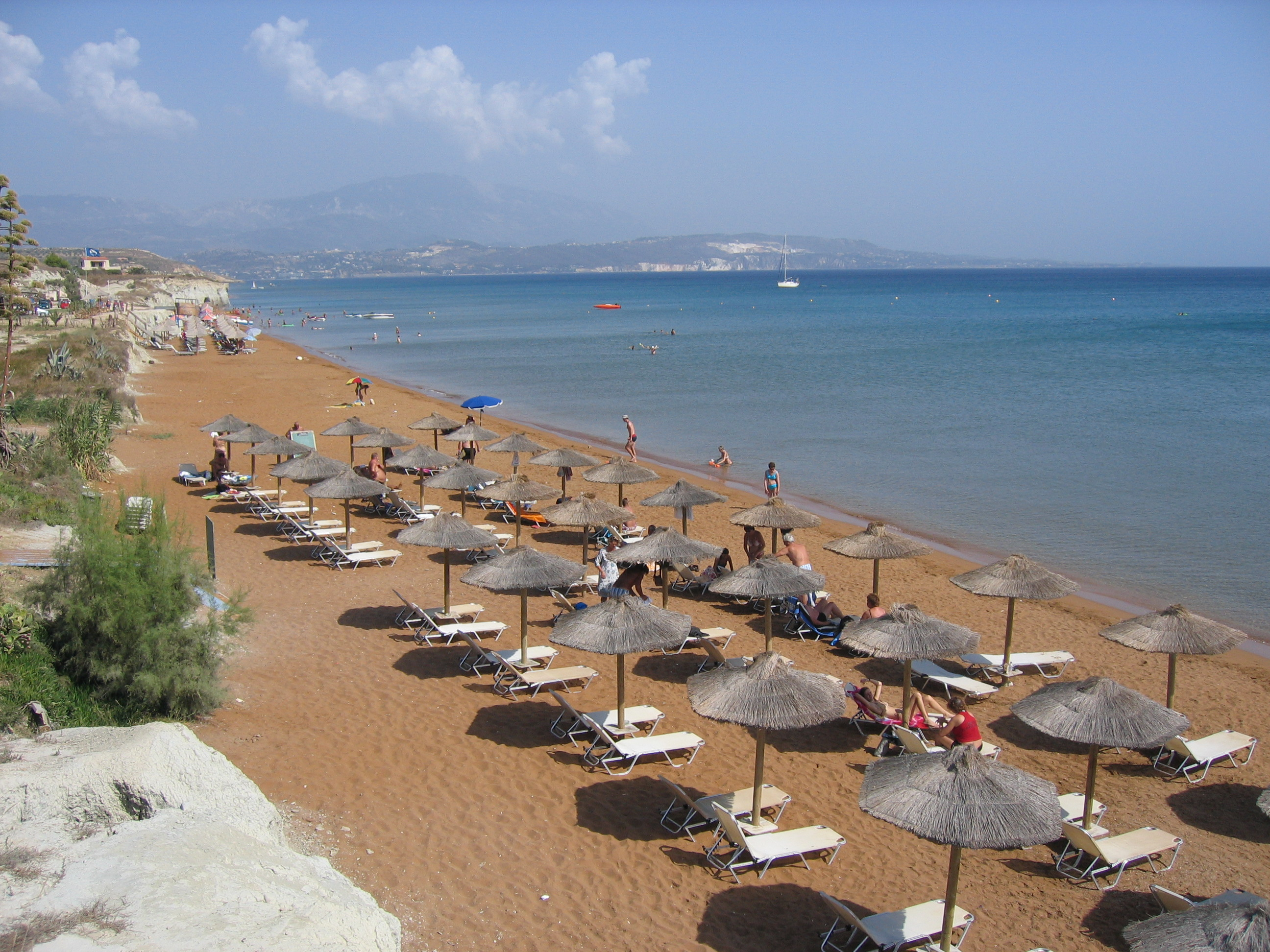
Xi Beach

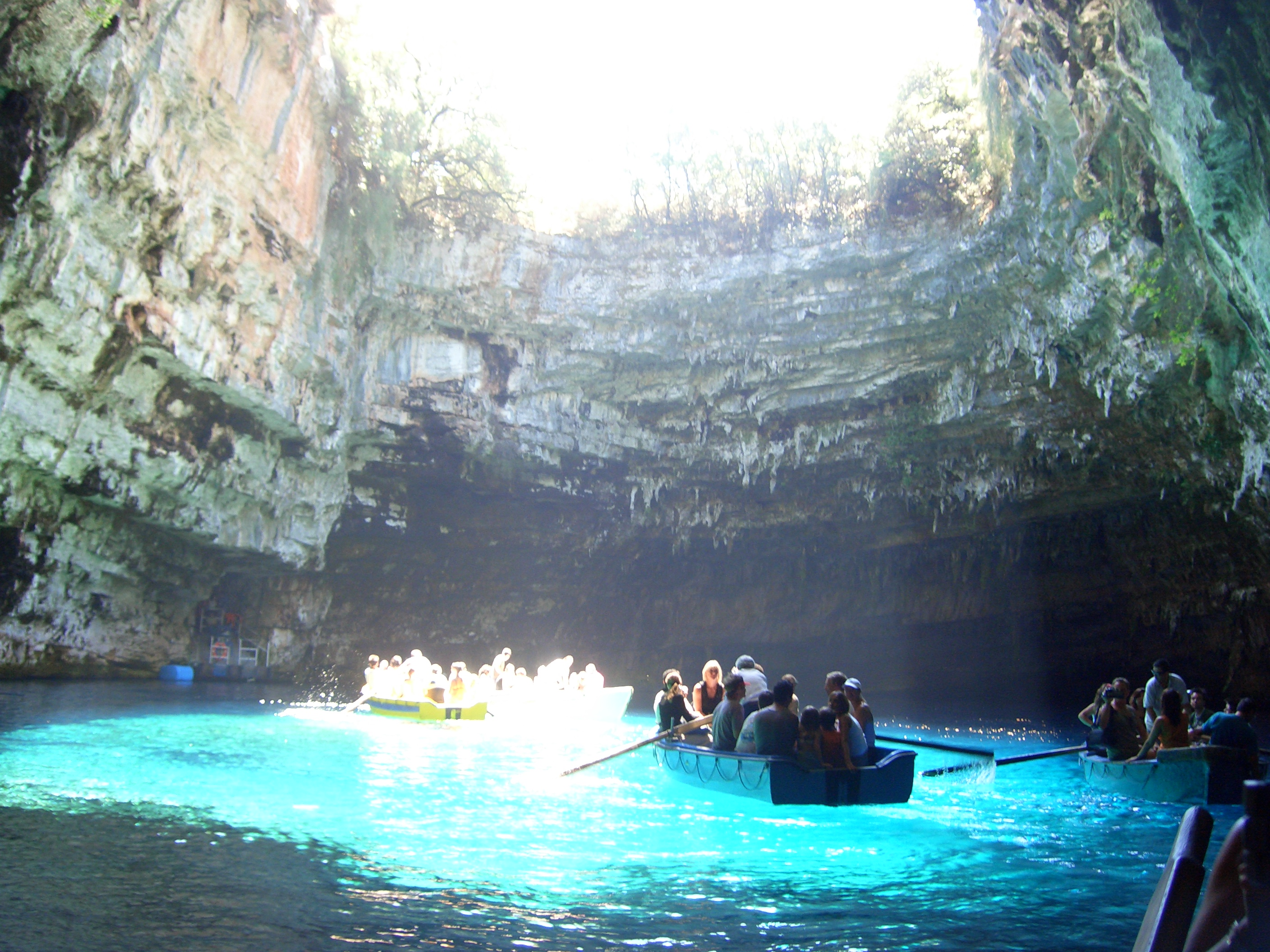
Melissani Cave

The main island of the regional unit is Cephalonia and has a size of 773 km^{2} (298 sq mi), with a population density of 55 people per square kilometre (140 people/mi^{2}). The town of Argostoli has one-third of the island's inhabitants. Lixouri is the second major settlement, and the two towns together account for almost two-thirds of the prefecture's population.

The other major islands are: Petalas Island and Asteris Island, but they are uninhabited.

Cephalonia lies in the heart of an earthquake zone, and dozens of minor, unrecorded tremors occur each year. In 1953, a massive earthquake destroyed almost all of the settlements on the island, leaving only Fiskardo in the north untouched.

Important natural features include Melissani Lake, the Drogarati caves, and the Koutavos Lagoon in Argostoli.

The island has a rich biodiversity, with a substantial number of endemic and rare species. Some areas have been declared a site in the European Union's Natura 2000 network.

=== Mountains ===
The island's highest mountain is Mount Ainos, with an elevation of 1628 meters; to the west-northwest are the Paliki mountains, where Lixouri is found, with other mountains including Geraneia (Gerania) and Agia Dynati. The top of Mount Ainos is covered with fir trees and is a natural park.

Forestry is rare on the island; however, its timber output is one of the highest in the Ionian islands, although lower than that of Elia in the Peloponnese. Forest fires were common during the 1990s and the early 2000s, and still pose a major threat to the population.

=== Capes ===
- Cape Agios Georgios: approximate coordinates 38.1667°N 20.43333°E
- Cape Kounopetra
- Cape Atheras: north-western corner of the island

=== Flora ===
Most of the Ainos mountain range is designated as a National Park and is covered with the rare species of Greek fir (Abies cephalonica) and black pine (Pinus nigra).

=== Fauna ===
Cephalonia is well known for its endangered loggerhead turtle population, also known as the Caretta caretta turtle, which nests on many of the beaches along the south coast of the island. The turtles can also be seen in the waters of Argostoli harbour, in Koutavos Lagoon, while walking on De Bosset Bridge. A small population of the endangered Mediterranean monk seal, Monachus monachus, also lives around the island's coast, especially on parts of the coast which are inaccessible to humans due to the terrain. Caves on these parts of the coast offer ideal locations for the seals to give birth to their pups and nurse them through the first months of their lives. The most famous breeding ground in Cephalonia is a cave on Foki beach, located on the north-east coast near Fiskardo.

The European pine marten also inhabits the island.

Over 200 species of birds have been spotted on the island.

=== Climate ===
Cephalonia has hot, sunny summers and mild, rainy winters. According to the Köppen climate classification system, it has a hot-summer Mediterranean climate (Csa). During winter, it can occasionally snow on the mountain peaks of the island's mountains. The winter months can experience up to 156 mm of rainfall, resulting in high levels of humidity on the island. Winter temperature on Kefalonia averages at 14-15 °C during the day and 8-9 °C during the night. During the summer months, there is usually little to no rainfall. Temperatures range from nearly 30 °C during the day to around 21 °C at night.

Climate data for Argostoli (1981–2010)
Month	Jan	Feb	Mar	Apr	May	Jun	Jul	Aug	Sep	Oct	Nov	Dec	Year
Mean daily maximum °C (°F)	14.3 (57.7)	14.1 (57.4)	15.7 (60.3)	18.5 (65.3)	22.9 (73.2)	27.0 (80.6)	29.5 (85.1)	29.9 (85.8)	26.9 (80.4)	23.5 (74.3)	19.0 (66.2)	15.5 (59.9)	21.5 (70.7)
Daily mean °C (°F)	11.3 (52.3)	11.1 (52.0)	12.3 (54.1)	14.9 (58.8)	19.7 (67.5)	22.6 (72.7)	25.1 (77.2)	25.7 (78.3)	23.0 (73.4)	19.9 (67.8)	15.9 (60.6)	12.6 (54.7)	17.8 (64.0)
Mean daily minimum °C (°F)	8.3 (46.9)	8.0 (46.4)	9.0 (48.2)	11.2 (52.2)	14.5 (58.1)	18.2 (64.8)	20.6 (69.1)	21.6 (70.9)	19.1 (66.4)	16.3 (61.3)	12.8 (55.0)	9.7 (49.5)	14.2 (57.6)
Average rainfall mm (inches)	93.1 (3.67)	100.0 (3.94)	66.6 (2.62)	49.7 (1.96)	20.4 (0.80)	10.5 (0.41)	1.3 (0.05)	5.6 (0.22)	31.3 (1.23)	94.7 (3.73)	155.9 (6.14)	150.0 (5.91)	779.1 (30.68)
Average rainy days (≥ 1.0 mm)	9	9	9	5	3	1	0	1	3	7	11	12	70
Source: Meteo-climat-bzh

== Economy ==
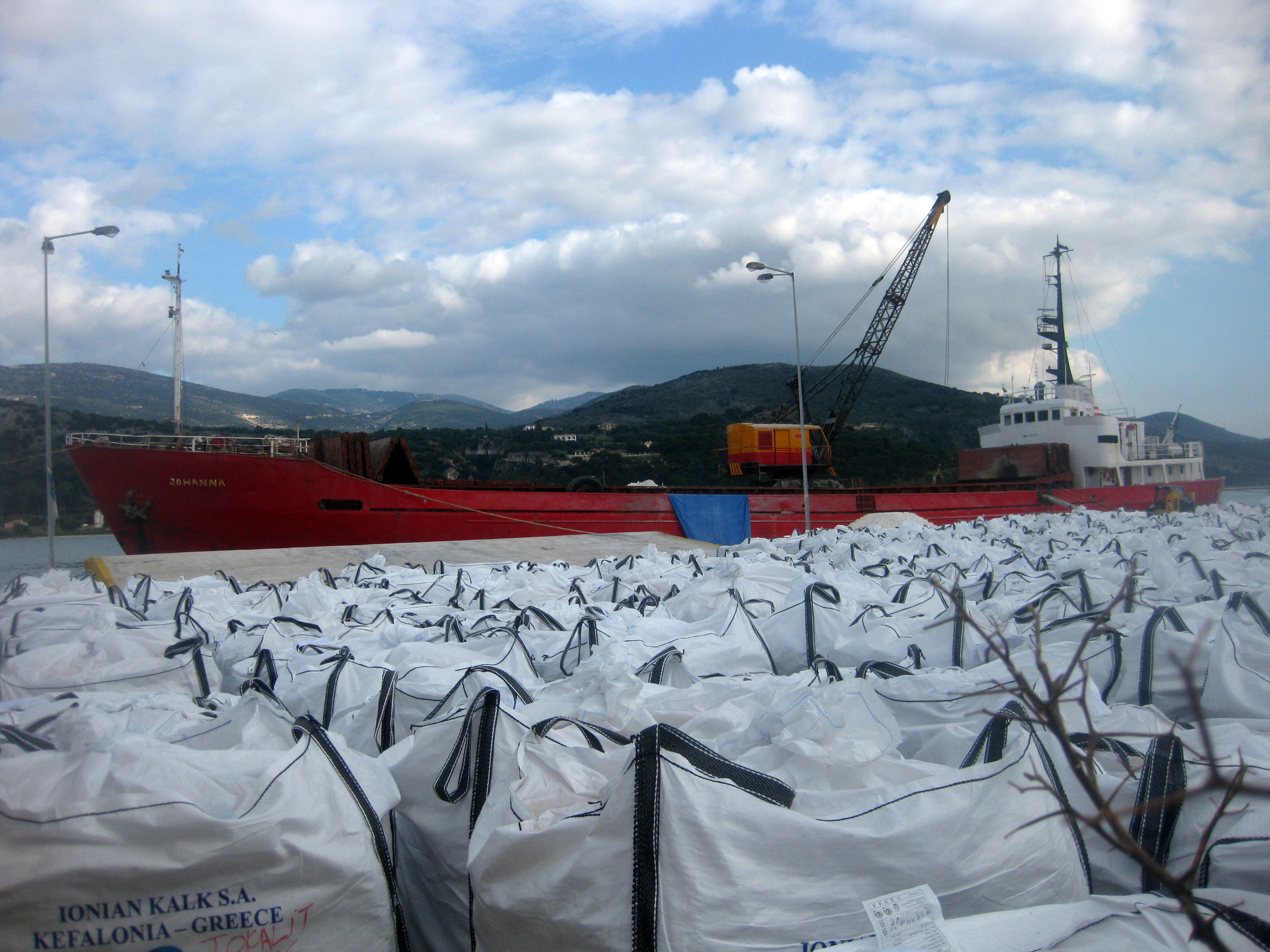
Calcium carbonate loaded in the port of Argostoli.

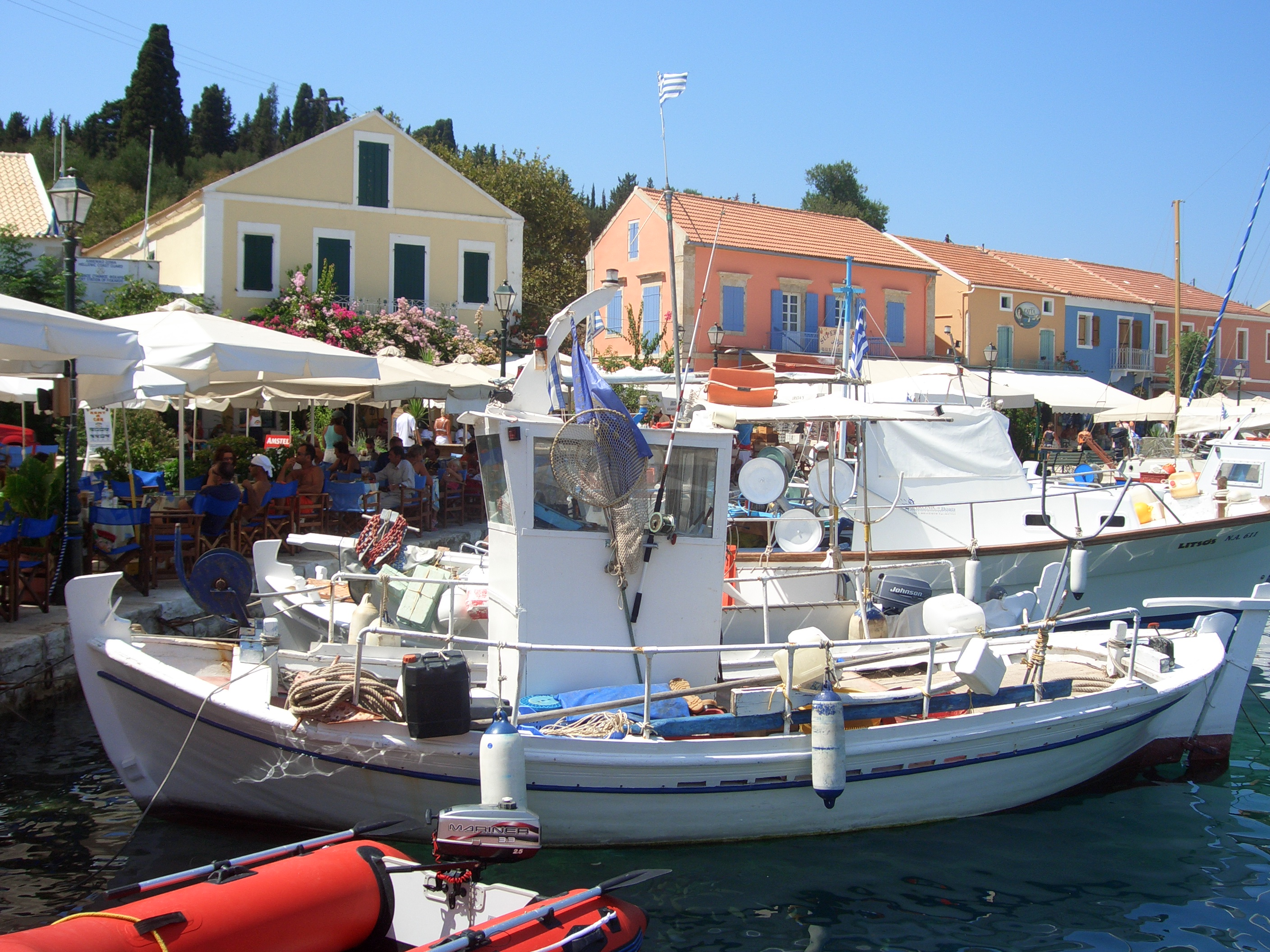
Fiscardo is a tourist attraction on the northern part of the island.

Wine and raisins are the oldest products exported, being important until the 20th century. Today, fish farming and calcium carbonate are most important.

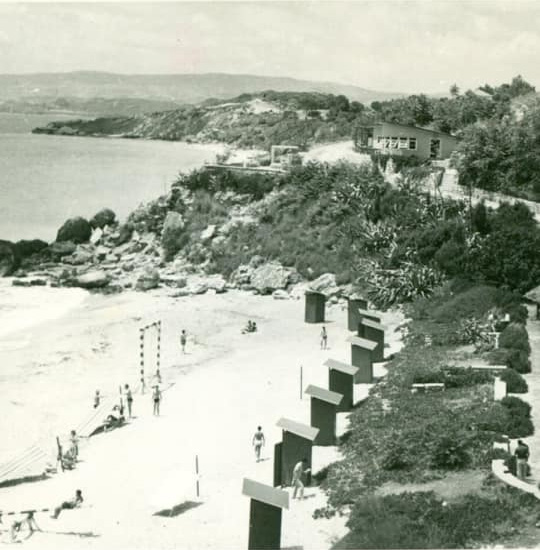
A beach close to Argostoli in 1930

Most Greek ship-owner families have their origin in the islands of Andros, Chios, or Cephalonia.

=== Agriculture ===
The primary agricultural occupations are animal breeding and olive growing, with the remainder largely composed of grain and vegetables. Most vegetable production takes place on the plains, which cover less than 15% of the island, most of which is rugged and mountainous, suitable only for goats. Less than a quarter of the island's land is arable.

Until the 1970s, most Cephalonians lived in rural areas; today, two-thirds of the population resides in urban areas, with the remaining third living in rural towns and villages near farmland.

The island has a long winemaking tradition and is home to the dry, white lemony wines made from the Robola grape.

=== Olive oil production ===
Olive oil production is a major component of Cephalonia's economy. Until the 18th century, the quantity of olive oil produced on the island just covered the needs of the residents. However, the pressure of Venetian conquerors for olive plantation, especially after the loss of Peloponnese and Crete, resulted in increasing the production to such a degree that the first exports to Venice began. Before the 1953 Ionian earthquake, 200 oil presses were operating on the island; today, there are thirteen. There are over one million olive trees on Cephalonia, covering almost 55% of the island's area. Olive oil is very important to the island's local agricultural economy. "Koroneiki" and "theiako" are the two main varieties cultivated on the island, followed by a smaller number of "ntopia" and "matolia". Kefalonian olive oil has a green tone, a rich, greasy touch, and low acidity.

=== Tourism ===
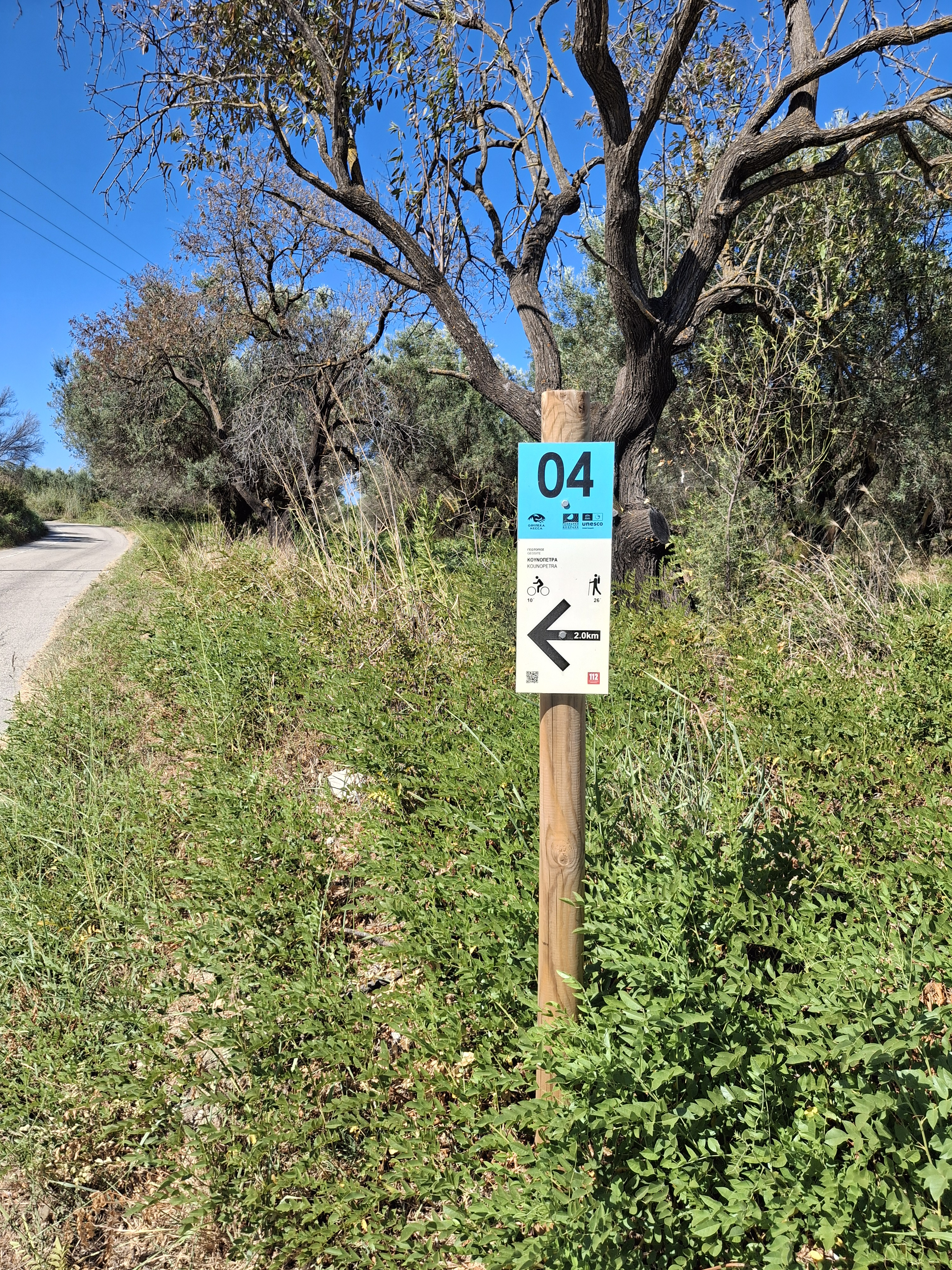
Geopark Signage to a Geosite. Among the many attractions, 50 are designated as "Geosites" within the "Geopark Kefalonia Ithaka." Additionally, there are other sites listed and mentioned, mostly of cultural interest, but they are not classified as Geosites.

Tourism to Cephalonia started in the early 19th century. The royal family of Greece sent their children in the summer Lixouri in the early 20th century, but the island was not discovered by most tourists until the 1980s. Cephalonia is a popular holiday destination for many Italians, due to its proximity to Italy.

Two cultural attractions, the fishing villages of Fiscardo and Assos, and other natural attractions, including Melissani underground lake, Drogarati cave, and Myrtos beach, have helped popularize Cephalonia. The film Captain Corelli's Mandolin (film) (2001), filmed on the island, made Cephalonia more widely known. The film was mainly shot in Argostoli, Sami and on Antisamos Beach.

== Culture ==
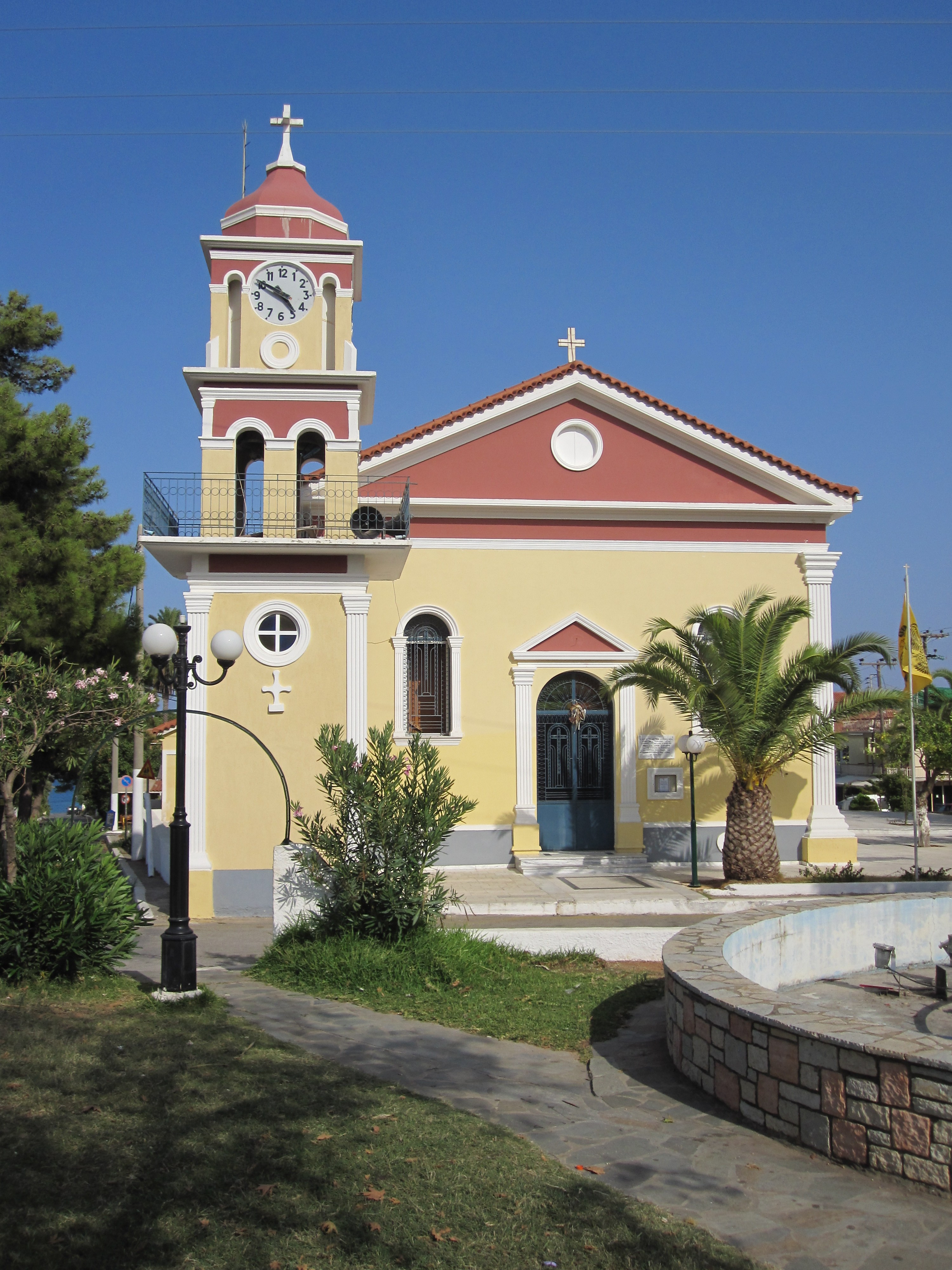
The Church of Gerasimus of Kefalonia, patron saint of Cephalonia, in Skala.

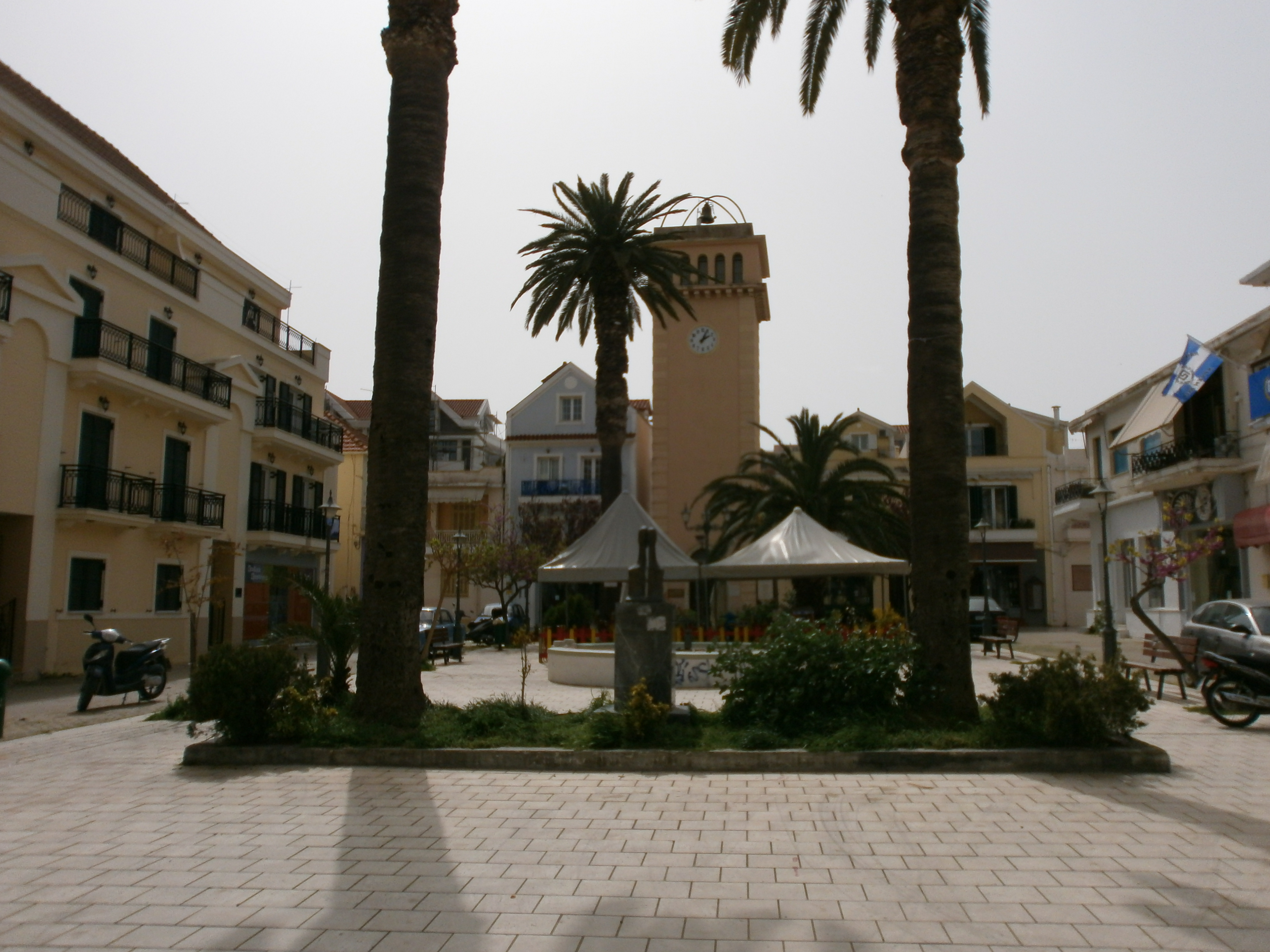
Cambana Square, Argostoli.

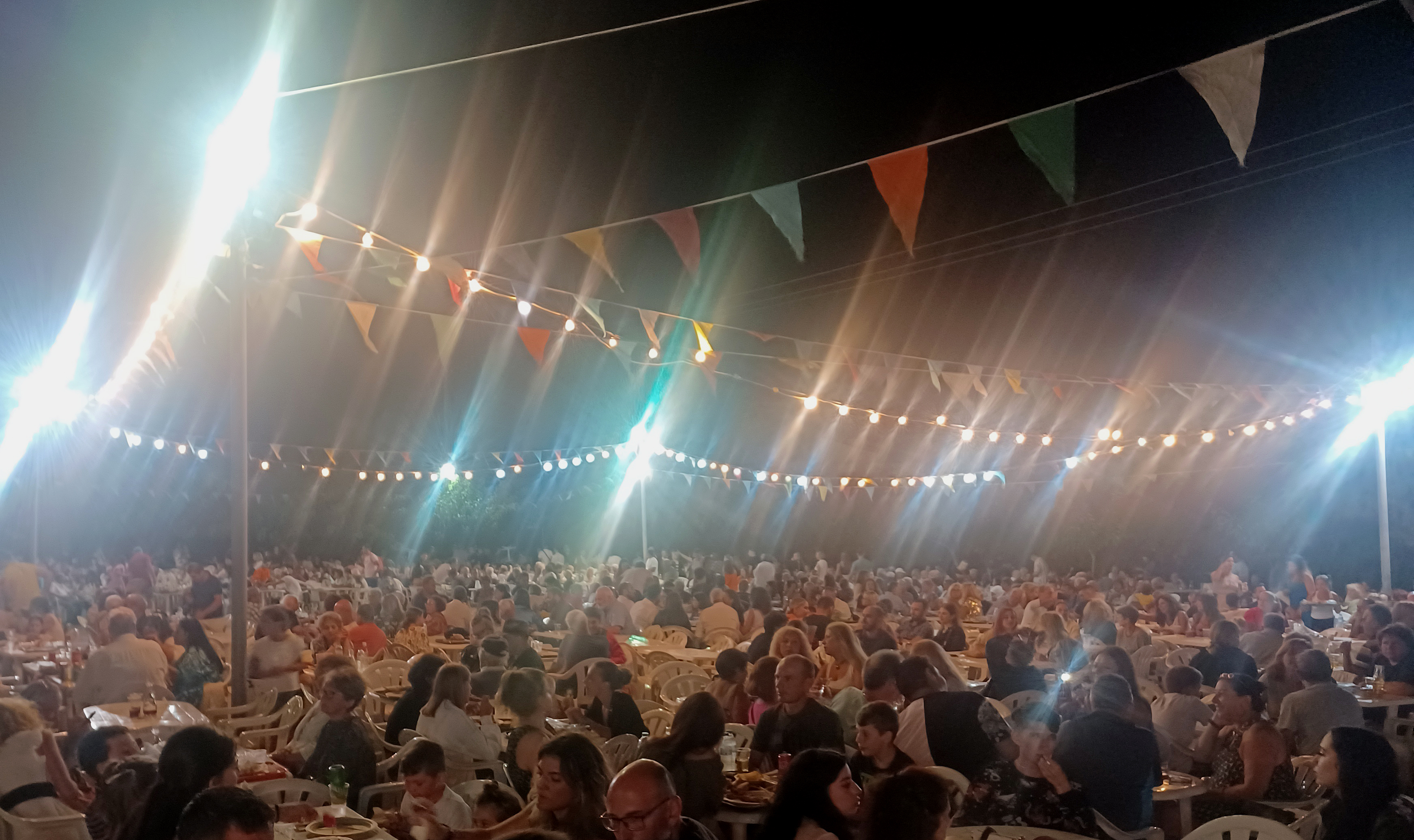
The wine festival in Mantzavinata

=== Monasteries and churches ===
Across the broader island, two large monasteries are to be found: the first is that of Haghia Panagia in Markopoulo to the southeast, and the other lies on the road between Argostoli and Michata, on a small plain surrounded by mountains. This second has an avenue of about 200 trees aligned from NW to SE, with a circle in the middle, and is the monastery of Saint Gerasimus of Kefalonia, patron saint of the island, whose relics can be seen and venerated at the old church of the monastery. The monastery of "Sissia" was probably founded by Francis of Assisi. It was destroyed in 1953, but the ruins still exist. Although much of the island was destroyed by earthquakes, many notable churches all over the island have survived, some dating back to the Renaissance. The ornaments of the churches are influenced by Venetian manierism.

=== Music ===
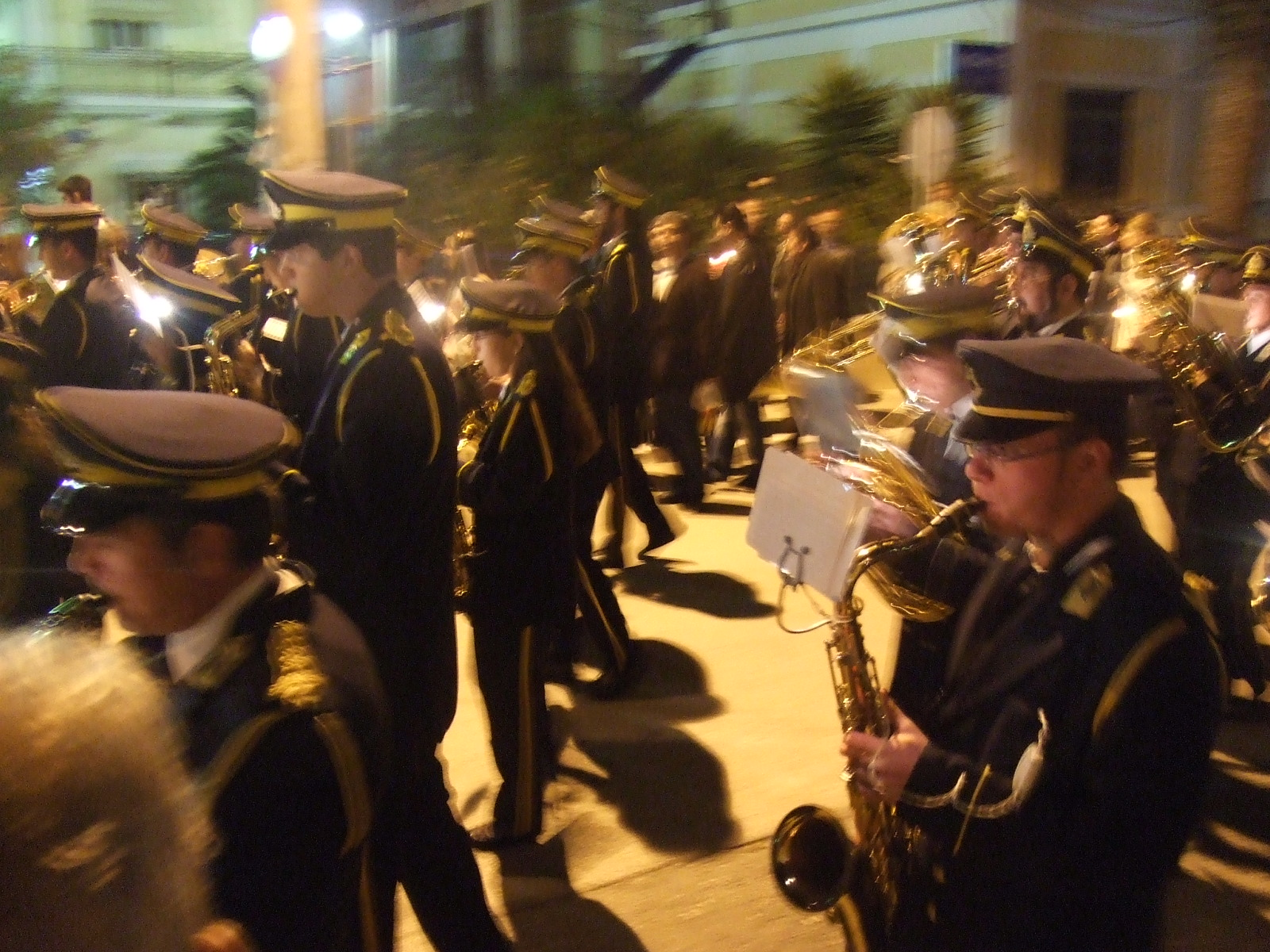
The Lixouri Philharmonic Orchestra during Easter.

The Ionian Islands have a musical tradition called the Ionian School. Lixouri has the Philharmonic Orchestra (since 1836) and Argostoli the Rokos Vergottis Conservatory. Richard Strauss visited Lixouri some times, where he had an affair with the pianist Dora Wihan (born Weiss).

The Ionian Islands also developed a distinctive culture, primarily as they did not experience Ottoman occupation, instead having ties to Venice, and musically drew from Italian influences and Western Harmonics. This evolved into a unique musical style among the Greeks, the Cantada (Serenade), very similar to the Latin/Spanish/Italian Cantar (to sing). The Cantadas are an example of the Ionian music. Cantadas are still very popular and can be heard even today.

=== Literature and film ===
Lord Byron arrived in Cephalonia on August 3, 1823, aboard the brig Hercules, after setting sail from Genoa. He resided in the village of Metaxata for five months. His time in Cephalonia was a productive period for Lord Byron, it is documented in his writings, including his "Cephalonia Journal" and a poem about his 36th birthday. Lord Byron wrote parts of "Prelude" and Don Juan in Livatho. Additionally, a theory was proposed by Greek researcher Libieris Liberatos as to the true identity of the island setting from Shakespeare's The Tempest being Cephalonia.

The novelists Nikos Kavvadias (1910–1975) and the Swiss Georges Haldas (1917–2010) spent parts of their lives on the island. The family of Romanian working class writer Panait Istrati was from the island.

Andreas Laskaratos was a satirical poet and wrote about the society in the town of Lixouri.

Perhaps the best known appearance of Cephalonia in popular culture is in the novel Captain Corelli's Mandolin, by the English author Louis de Bernières. The book is believed to have been inspired by the village of Farsa, just outside Argostoli. The love story comprising the theme of the book is set before and after the Acqui Division massacre, during the Second World War. A film adaptation was released in 2001. During filming, there was a lively debate between the production team, local authorities, as well as groups of citizens, as to the complex historical details of the island's antifascist resistance. As a result, political references were omitted from the film, and the romantic core of the book was preserved, without entering complex debates about the island's history. In 2005, Riccardo Milani made his TV film, Cefalonia, also about the massacre, with music by Ennio Morricone.

=== Museums ===
- Korgialeneios Museum (under the Korgialeneios Library) in Argostoli
- Kosmetatos Foundation in Argostoli
- Archaeological Museum of Argostoli
- Iakovatios-Library (and museum) in Lixouri
- Museum in Fiskardo
- Kefalonia Natural History Museum
- Nautical Museum of Sami

== Higher education ==
- Ionian University, Argostoli Campus (Department of Food Science and Technology and Department of Digital Media and Communication)
- Ionian University, Lixouri Campus (Department of Ethnomusicology)
- National Merchant Marine Academy, Argostoli
- The Music School of Kefalonia – Rokos Vergotis Conservatory, Argostoli

== Sport ==
=== Baseball ===
- AINOS Kefalonia

=== Cycling ===
- AINOS Kefalonia podilatikos omilos 26710–25029

=== Football ===
- Anogi F.C.
- Argostoli A.U.
- Asteras Lixouri
- Asteras Z
- Dilinata AU
- Efgeros Faraklades Argostoli
- Ikossimias AU
- Kefalliniakos
- Kefalonia-Ithaca
- Leivatho A.U.
- Lixouri A.U.
- Olympiaki Floga
- Olympiakos Argostoli F.C.
- Pagkefalliniakos
- Pallixouriakos F.C.
- Papavrgiakos
- PAO Kefalos
- Pylariakos
- Proodos Ithaki
- Sami AU

=== Waterpolo, water sports ===
- The Nautical Club of Argostoli in Kefalonia, Greece, has a water polo team that competes in the National League A1. The club, established in 1957, also offers other water sports like rowing, sailing, and kayaking.
- Poseidonas Lixouriou water polo team, Lixouri

== Transportation ==
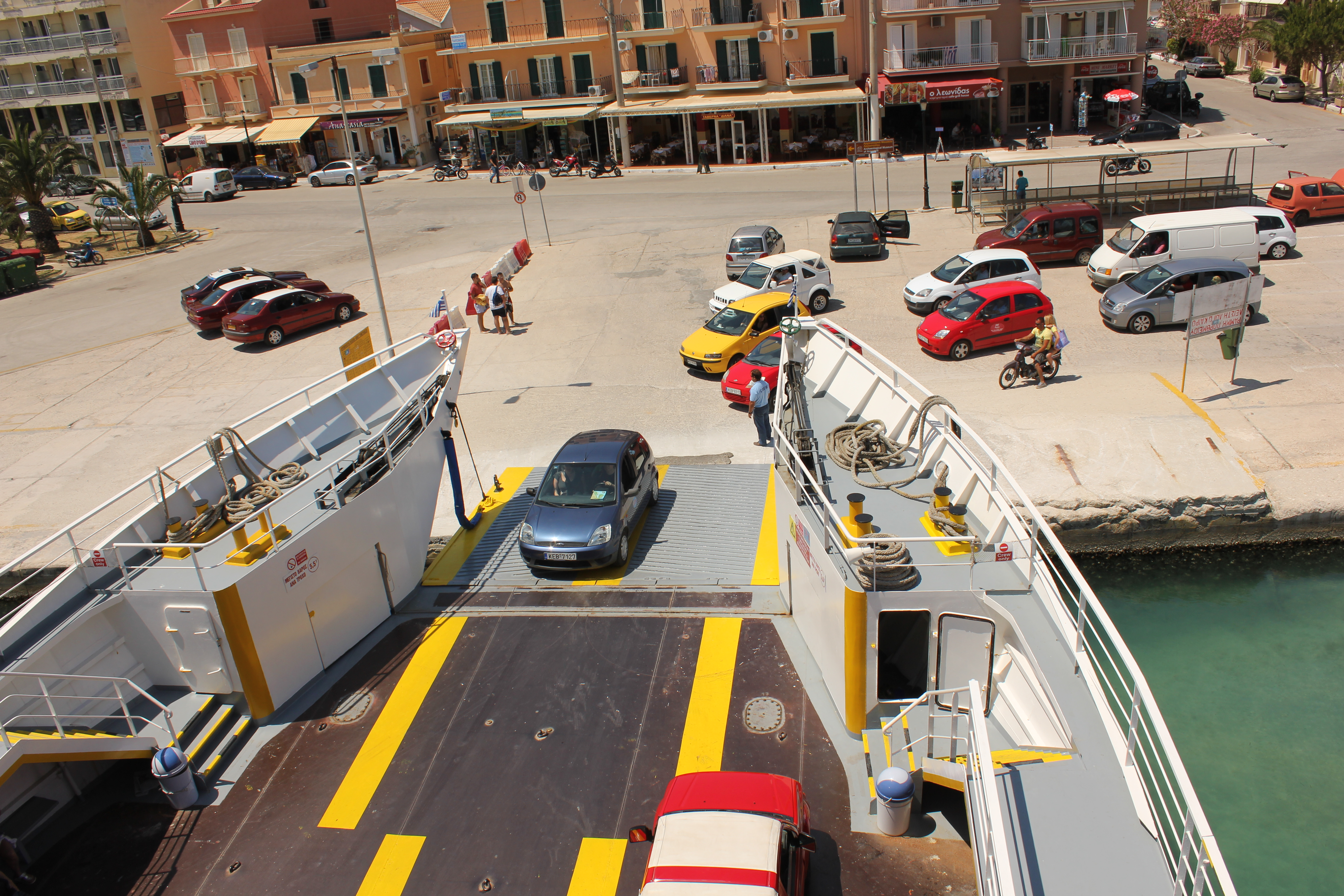
The ferry between Lixouri and Argostoli.

=== Harbours and ports ===
There are five harbours and ports in the prefecture and you can get to Kefalonia by boat: four main harbours on the island, Sami, a major port with links to Patras and Ithaca; Poros, in the south, has ferry routes to Kyllini; Argostoli, in the west, is the largest port, for local boats and ferries to Zante and regularly to Lixouri; Fiscardo, in the north, has links to Lefkas and Ithaca. There is room for about 100 small boats in Argostoli, where the port stretches 1 kilometre around the bay, while Lixouri is situated 4 km (2 mi) across the bay from Argostoli, on the Lixouri peninsula. There is a road connection to the rest of the island, but driving from Lixouri to Argostoli involves a 30 km (19 mi) detour.

=== Roads ===
The first larger roads were built by the British in the 19th century. In the 20th century, asphalt roads were built, and since 1995, almost all streets connecting villages and beaches have been covered with asphalt. Since c. 2000, the Lixouri bypass was built, and a four-lane street south of Argostoli was constructed. Some important roads include:

- The EO50 road, also known as the Argostoli–Sami National Road
- Argostoli-Poros Road
- Argostoli-Fiskardo Road (with link to Lixouri).
- Road linking Poros and Sami

=== Public transportation ===
The ferry between Argostoli and Lixouri goes every hour and every half-hour in the season. A few bus lines serve the more rural areas of Kefalonia, but often only twice a day. The KTEL bus cooperation offers services from Lixouri, Poros, and Argostoli to the mainland.

=== Airport ===
Cephalonia has one airport, Kefalonia Island International Airport, named Anna Pollatou (IATA: EFL, ICAO: LGKF) with a runway around 2.4 km (1.5 mi). in length, located about 10 km (6 mi) south of Argostoli. Almost every scheduled flight is an Olympic Air route, flying mainly to and from Athens, although there is an Ionian Island Hopper service three times a week calling at Cephalonia, Zante and Lefkas. In summer, the airport handles several charter flights from all over Europe.

In December 2015, the privatisation of Kefalonia Airport and 13 other regional airports of Greece was finalised with the signing of the agreement between the Fraport AG/Copelouzos Group joint venture and the state privatisation fund. "We signed the deal today," the head of Greece's privatisation agency HRADF, Stergios Pitsiorlas, told Reuters. According to the agreement, the joint venture will operate the 14 airports (including Kefallinia International Airport) for 40 years as of autumn 2016.

== Administration ==
Cephalonia is a distinct regional unit of the Ionian Islands region, and since 2019 it consists of three municipalities: Argostoli, Lixouri and Sami. Between the 2011 Kallikratis government reform and 2019, there was one single municipality on the island: Cephalonia, created out of the 8 former municipalities on the island. At the same reform, the regional unit Cephalonia was created out of part of the former Cephalonia Prefecture. The seat of administration is Argostoli, the island's main town.

The municipality of Argostoli consists of the following municipal units (former municipalities):

- Argostoli
- Eleios-Pronnoi
- Leivatho
- Omala

The municipality of Sami consists of the following municipal units:

- Erisos
- Pylaros
- Sami

The municipality of Lixouri coincides with the former municipality Paliki.

The regional unit has an area of 786.575 km^{2}. The Cephalonia regional unit also includes many uninhabited islands of the Echinades group. They are administered by the municipal unit of Pylaros. The most significant are as follows:

Name	Greek	Subgroup	Area (km^{2})	Highest Point	Location
Praso	Πράσο	Drakoneres			38°28′58″N 20°58′10″E
Sofia	Σοφία	Drakoneres	0.174		38°28′49″N 21°0′5″E
Lamprinos	Λαμπρινός	Drakoneres	0.352	61 m	38°28′22″N 21°0′18″E
Filippos	Φίλιππος	Drakoneres	0.046		38°28′17″N 21°0′55″E
Pistros	Πίστρος	Drakoneres	0.114	41 m	38°27′51″N 21°0′58″E
Kalogiros	Καλόγηρος	Drakoneres	0.249		38°29′28″N 21°1′49″E
Tsakalonisi	Τσακαλονήσι	Drakoneres	0.1		38°27′44″N 21°2′11″E
Girovaris or Gkravaris	Γηρόβαρης or Γκράβαρης	Modia		24 m	38°26′24″N 21°1′36″E
Soros	Σωρός	Modia	0.038	31 m	38°26′5″N 21°1′30″E
Apasa	Άπασα	Modia	0.024	17 m	38°25′53″N 21°1′29″E
Modio or Modi	Μοδιό or Μόδι	Modia	0.258	66 m	38°25′25″N 21°1′20″E
Petalas	Πεταλάς	Ouniades	5.497	251 m	38°24′50″N 21°5′41″E

== Notable people and residents ==
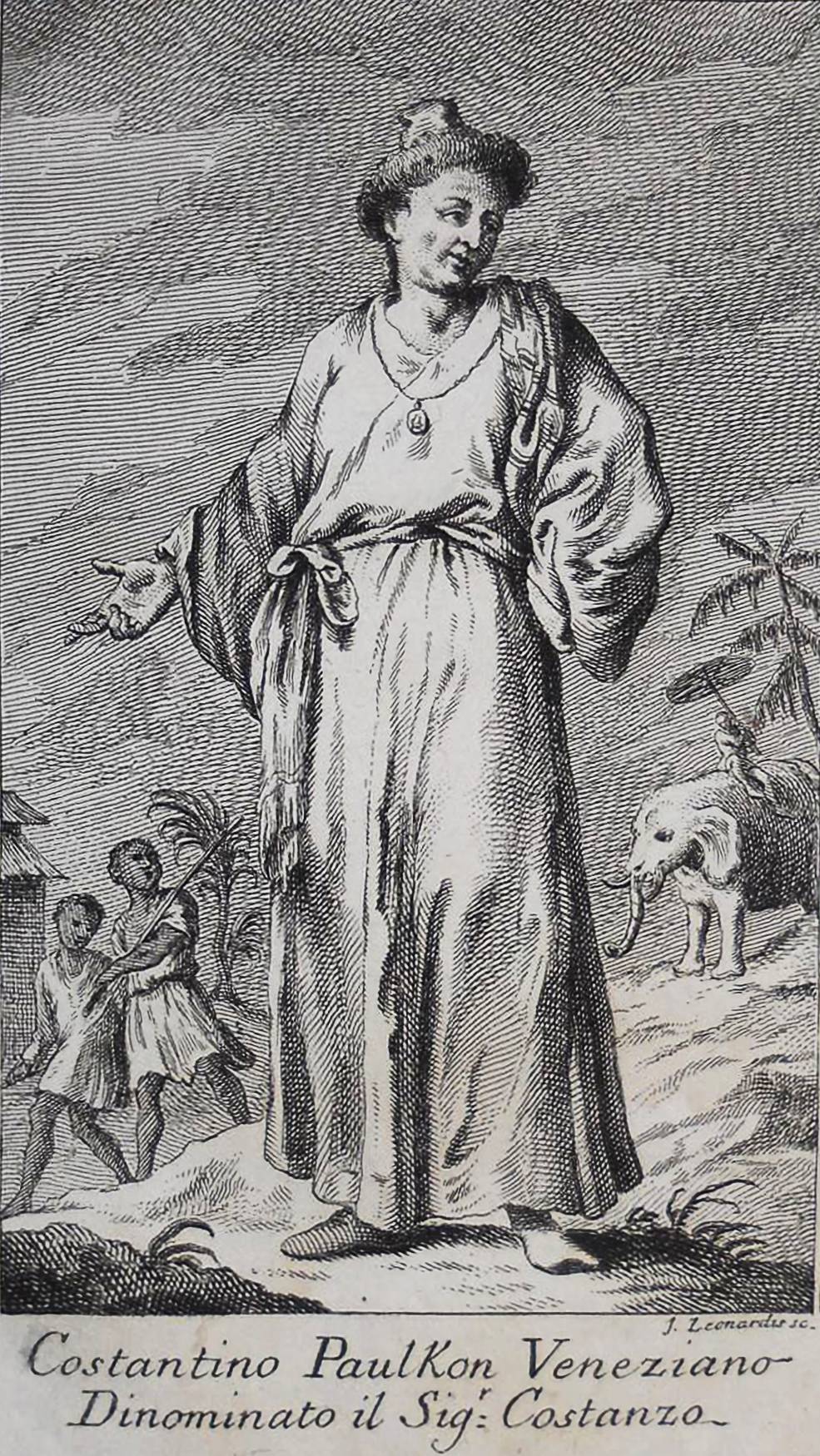
Constantine Phaulkon.

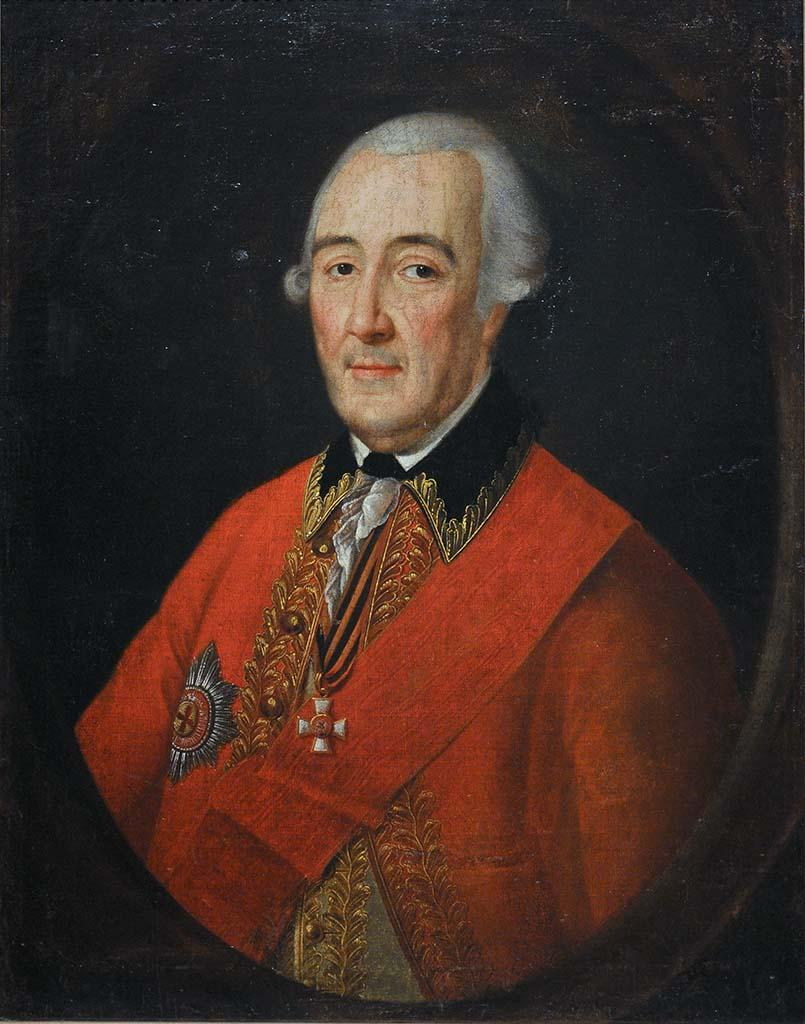
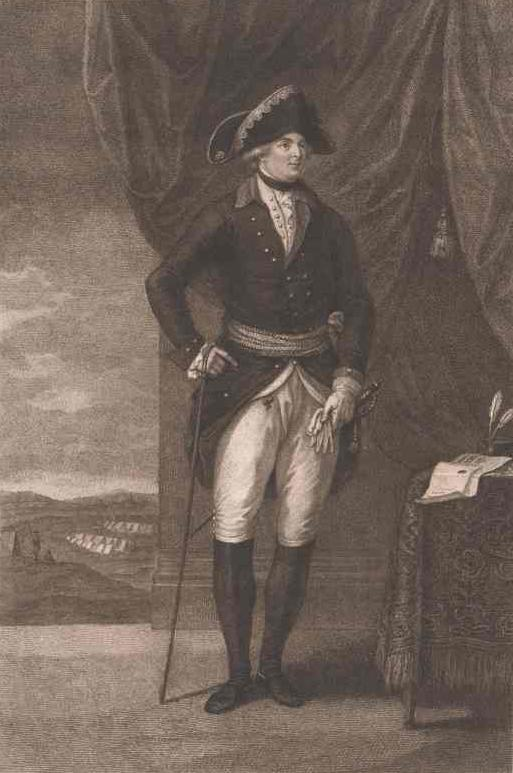
Cephalonia-born Greeks of the 18th century. Petros Melissinos (c. 1726–1797) (left) and Spiridon Louzis (c. 1741–1815) (right).

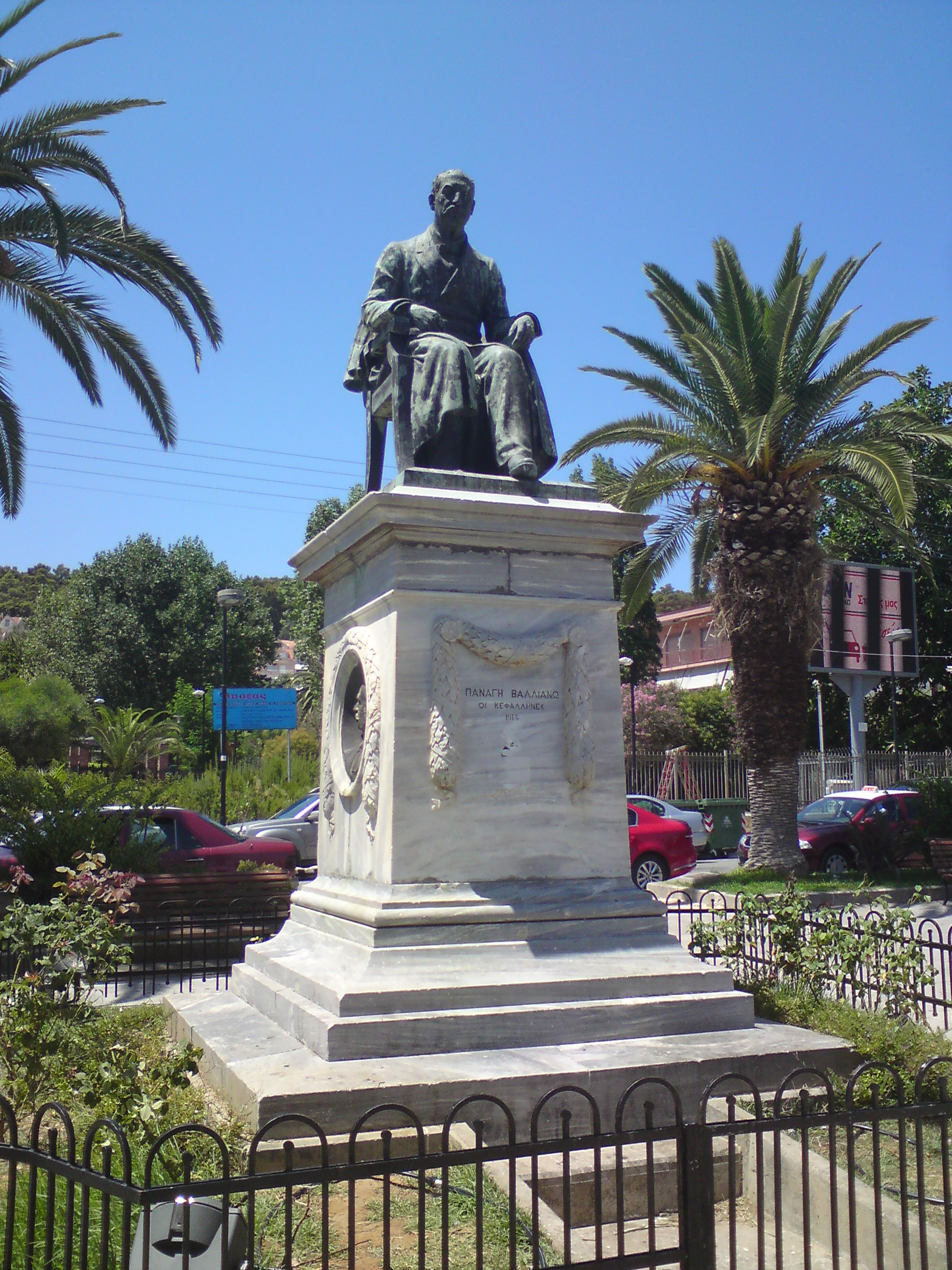
Statue of Panayis Athanase Vagliano in Argostoli.

Antiquity

- Cephalus, hero-figure in Greek mythology, Patriarch of all Cephalonians (Cephallenians)
- Odysseus of Ithaca, king of the Cephalonians
- Epiphanes was born on Cephalonia in the late 1st century or early 2nd century to Carpocrates (his father), and Alexandria of Kephallenia. He is the legendary author of On Righteousness, a notable Gnostic literary work that promotes communist principles.
- Gaius Antonius Hybrida, the uncle of the famed triumvir Mark Antony and co-consul of Cicero, who was exiled to Cephalonia in 59 BC.

Middle Ages to 1800

- Juan de Fuca (Ioannis Phokas) (1536–1602), captain and explorer
- Constantine Phaulkon (1647–1688), adventurer, first counsellor to King Narai of Ayutthaya
- Giacomo Pylarini (1659–1718), a doctor who gave the first smallpox inoculation outside of Turkey and contributed to the later development of vaccination against smallpox, by Edward Jenner.
- Ilias Miniatis (1669–1714), clergyman, writer, and preacher. Born in Lixouri
- Leichoudes brothers, founders of the Slavic Greek Latin Academy in Moscow
- Andreas Metaxas (Greek: Ανδρέας Μεταξάς) (1786 – September 19, 1860), prime minister of Greece, born on the island of Cephalonia.
- Spiridonos Louzis (Greek: Σπυρίδωνος Λούζης) (c. 1741–1815), Greek scholar, diplomat, politician, and naturalized ambassador of Prussia.
- Petros Melissinos (Greek: Πέτρος Μελισσηνός)(c. 1726–1797) was a General of the Army of the Russian Empire and was widely considered the best Russian artilleryman of the 18th century.

1800 to the recent past

- Giovanni Carandino, also known as Ioannis Karandinos (Greek: Ιωάννης Καραντηνός), was a Greek mathematician and translator of the major French mathematical works in the early 19th century.
- Panayis Athanase Vagliano, (Greek: Παναγής Βαλλιάνος) a.k.a. Panaghis Athanassiou Vallianos, (1814–1902) was a merchant and shipowner, acclaimed as the father of modern Greek shipping.
- Georgios Bonanos, sculptor (1863–1940)
- Nikolaos Xydias Typaldos (1826–1909), painter
- Photinos Panas, (January 30, 1832 – 1903) ophthalmologist, born on the Greek island of Cephalonia, Spartia. In 1860, he obtained his medical degree in Paris. He was the first professor of ophthalmology at the University of Paris and, in 1879, established the ophthalmology clinic at the Hôtel-Dieu de Paris.
- Ioannis Metaxas (April 12, 1871 – January 29, 1941), General, appointed Prime Minister of Greece between April and August 1936, and dictator during the 4th of August Regime, from 1936 until he died in 1941.
- Marinos Antypas (1872–1907), lawyer and journalist, one of the country's first socialists
- Christian Zervos (1889–1970) art collector, writer, and publisher
- Mikelis Avlichos (1844–1917) Greek anarchist

Recent past to present

- Giorgos Kalafatis (1890–1964), founder of Panathinaikos A.O.; his family descended from Dilinata of Cephalonia
- Spyridon Marinatos (1901–1974), archaeologist
- Antiochos Evangelatos (1903–1981), composer and conductor
- Dimitrios Loukatos (1908–2003), folklorist-anthropologist and specialist in Greek folklore.
- Nikolaos Platon (1909–1992), archaeologist
- Nikos Kavadias (1910–1975), poet and author
- Gerasimos D. Arsenis, (1931–2016) politician, former minister of Finance, Defense, and Education.
- Antonis Tritsis (1937–1992), politician, mayor of Athens
- Archie Karas (1950–2024), a Greek gambler known for turning a ten thousand dollar loan into a million dollars before losing it all
- Gerasimos D. Danilatos, physicist and inventor of environmental scanning electron microscope
- Athanassios S. Fokas, Department of Applied Mathematics and Theoretical Physics, University of Cambridge
- Richard Wright (1943–2008) from 1984 to 1994, keyboard player with Pink Floyd
- Dionisios Vlachos (1964–present), chemical engineer, inventor, and director
- Anna Pollatou (1983–2014) a rhythmic gymnast; she won a bronze medal at the 2000 Summer Olympics.
- Ellie Dimatos, (2007–present), female hockey player, won with team USA the 2024 IIHF World Women's U18 Championship

== Gallery ==
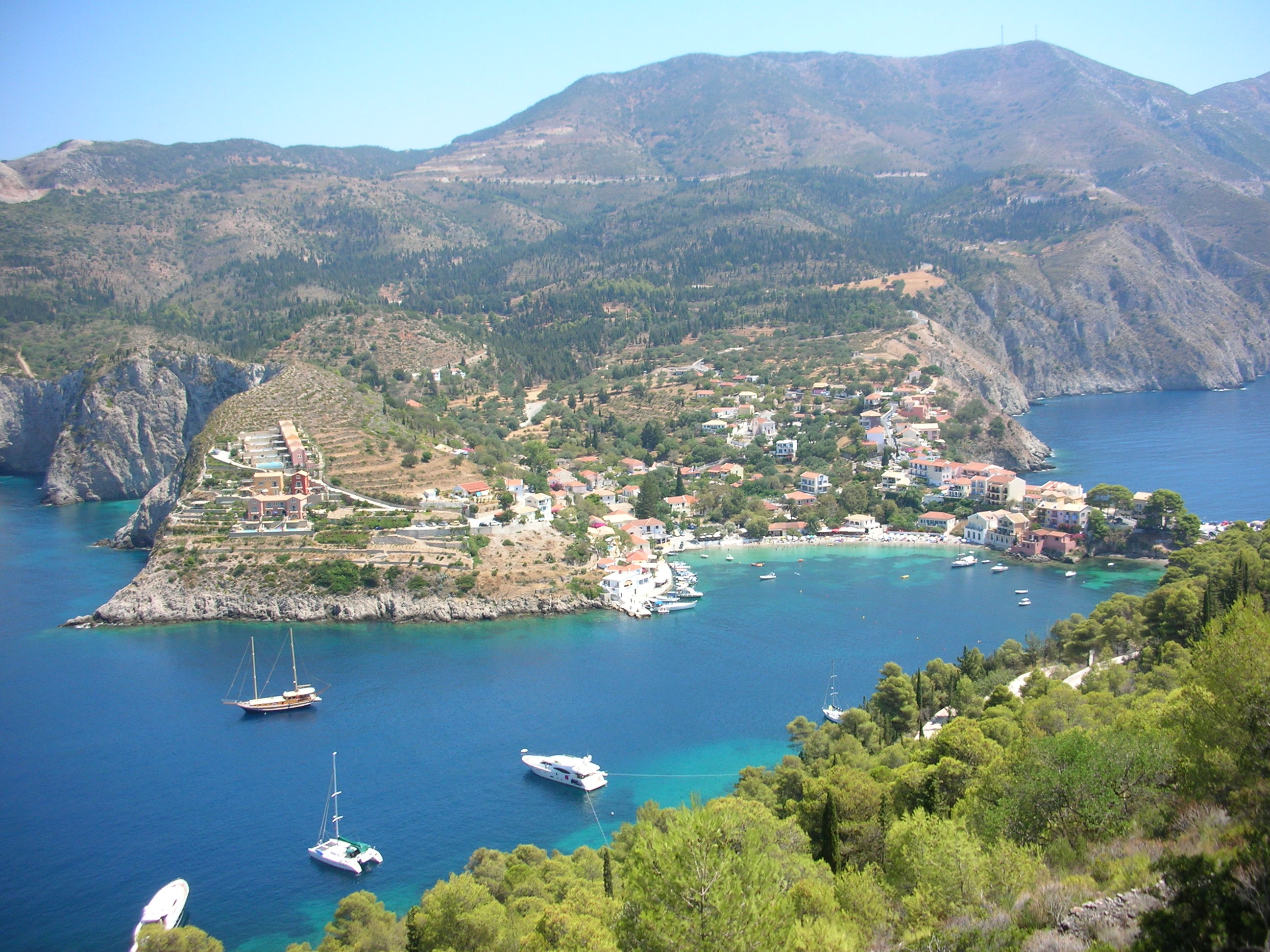
Assos

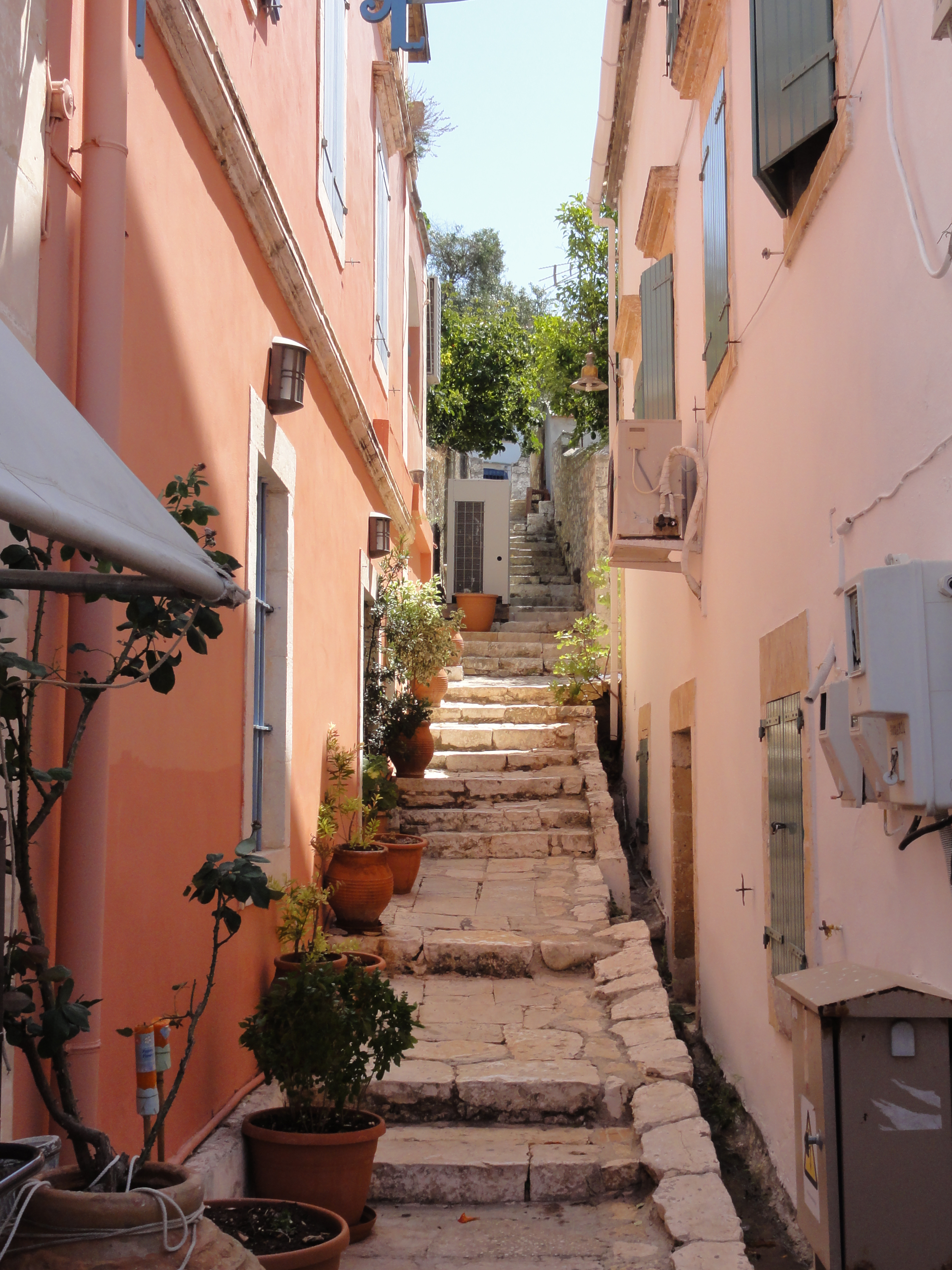
Street of Fiskardo

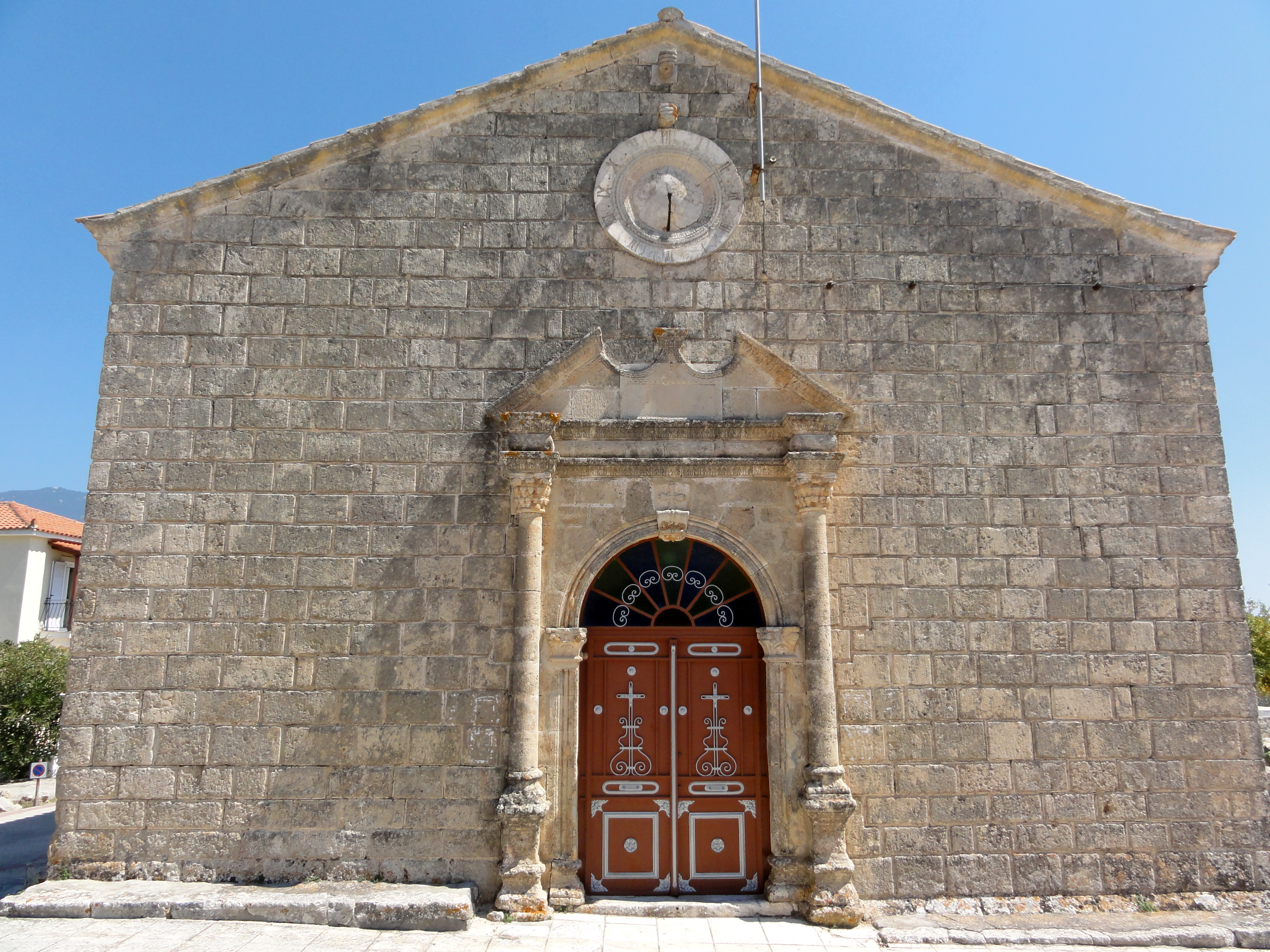
Facade of Evangelistria church

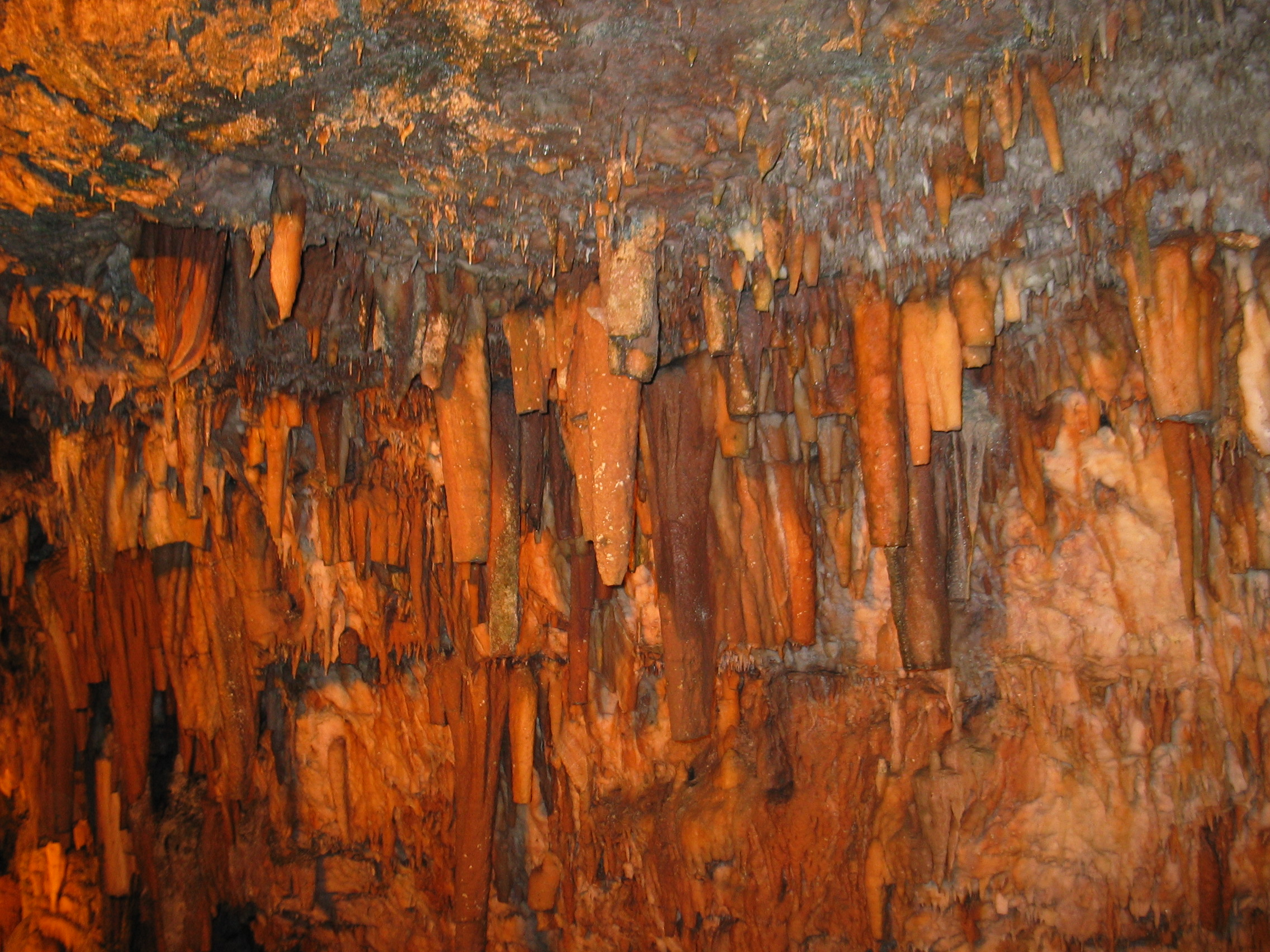
Drogarati cave

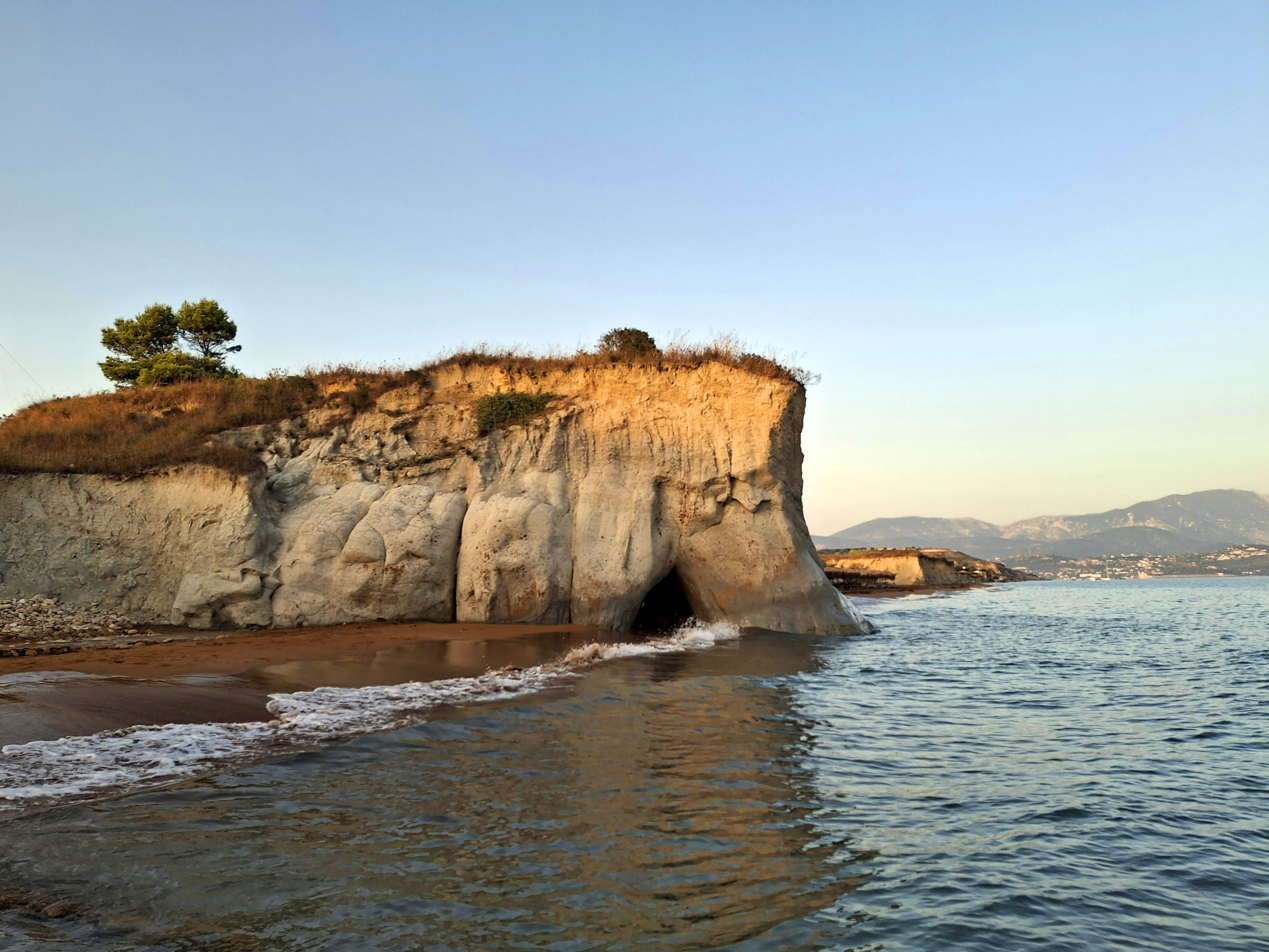
Xi beach

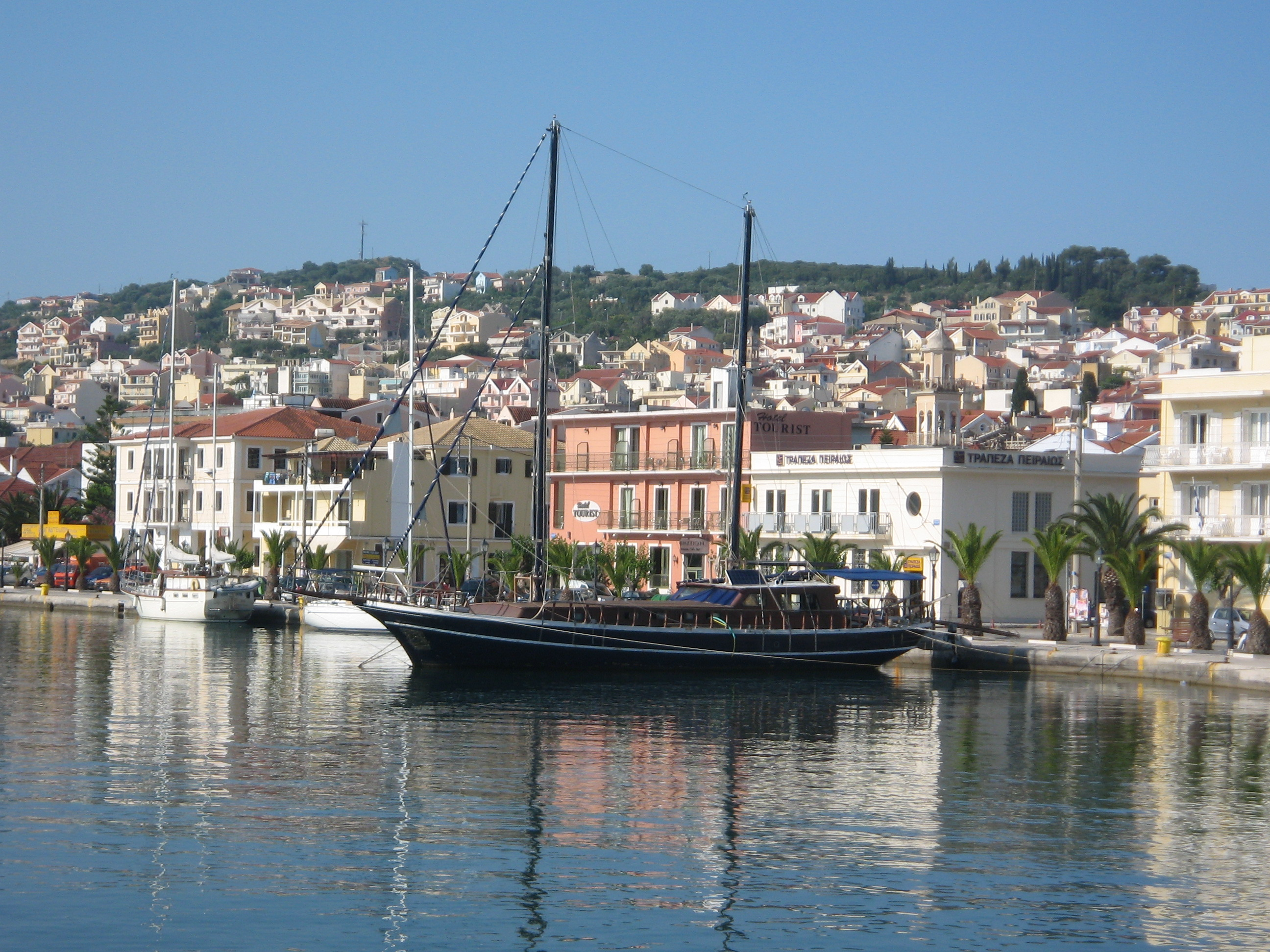
Port of Argostoli

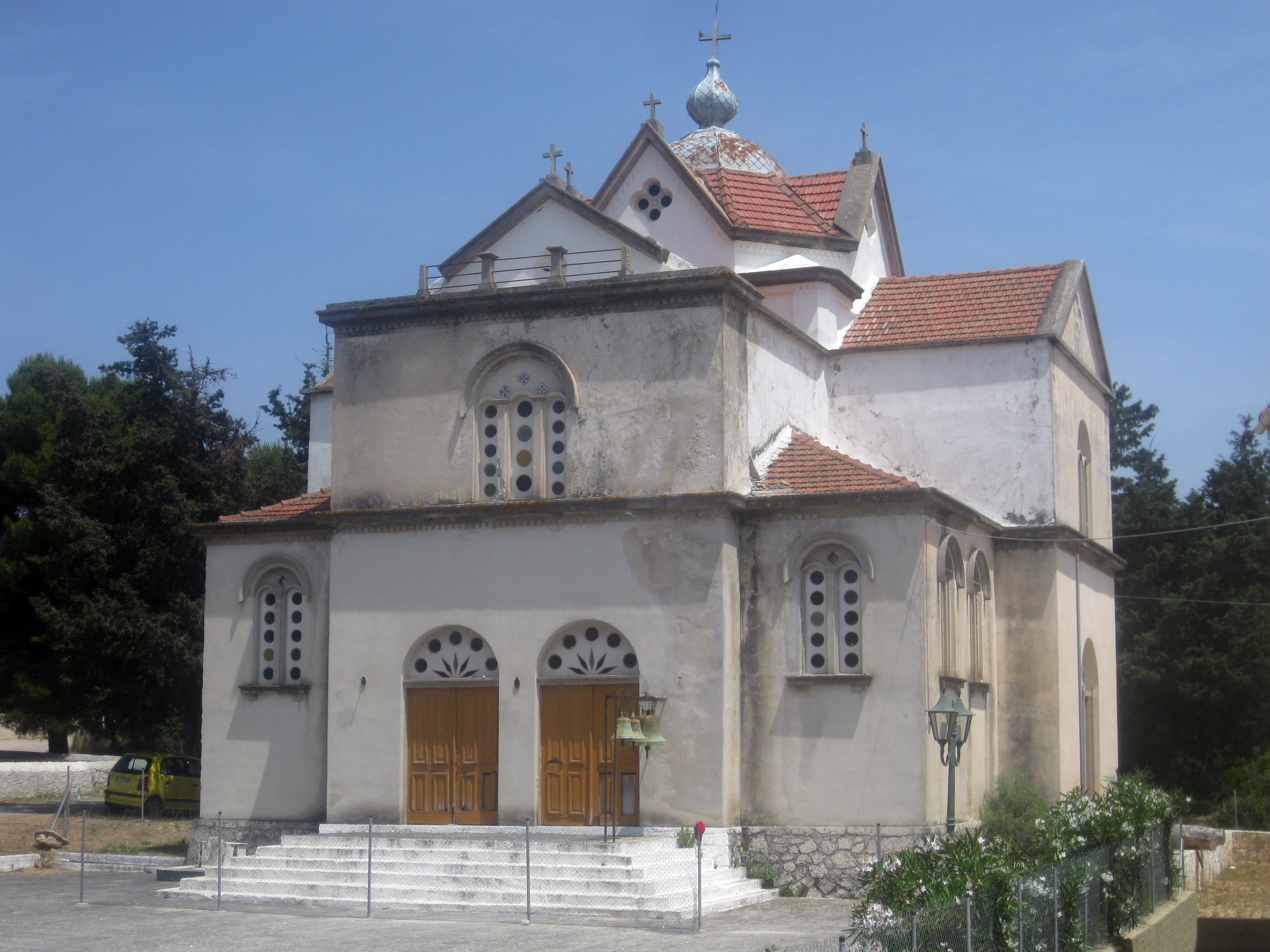
Church in Russian style, Antipata

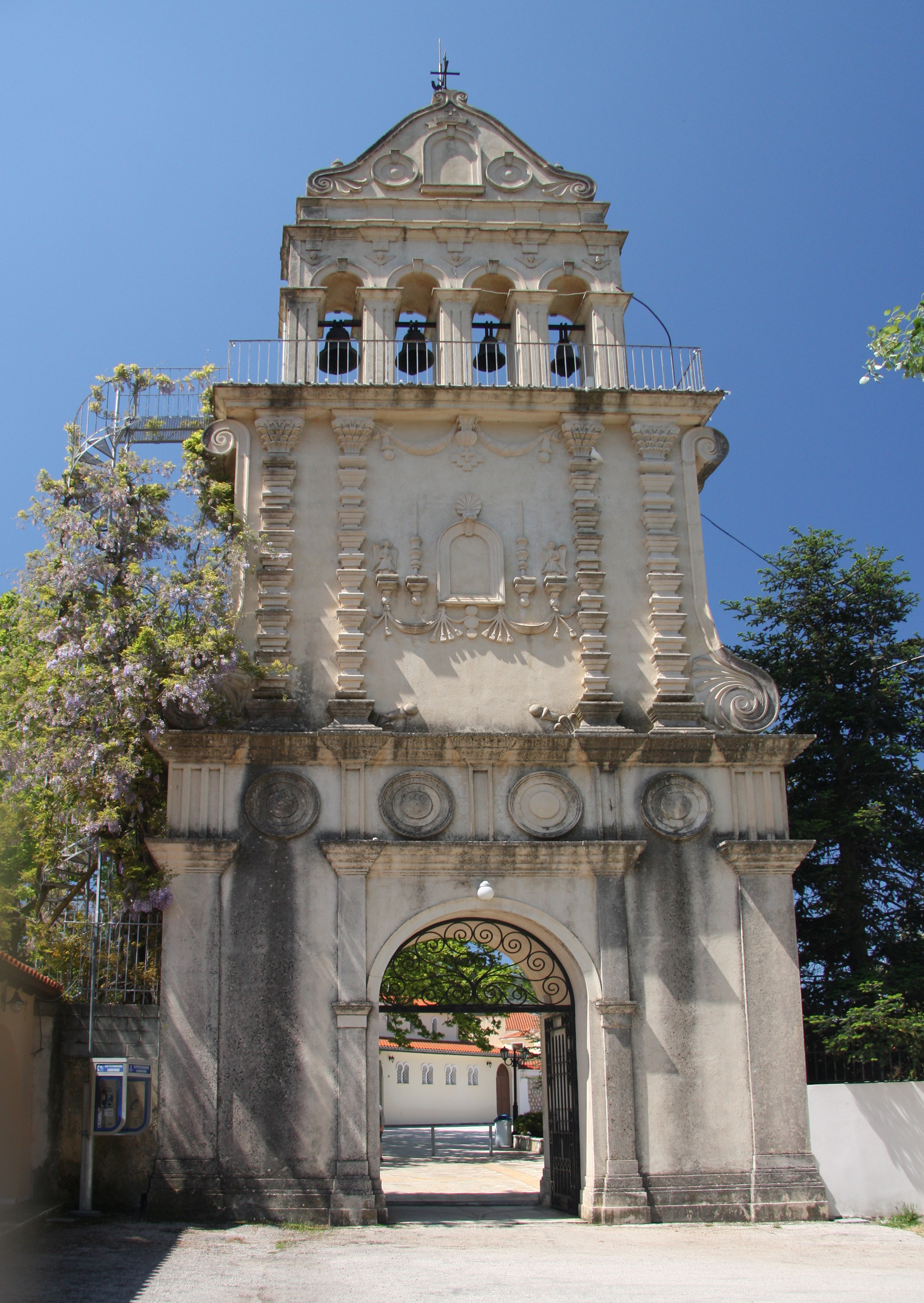
Belltower of the Monastery of Agios Gerasimos

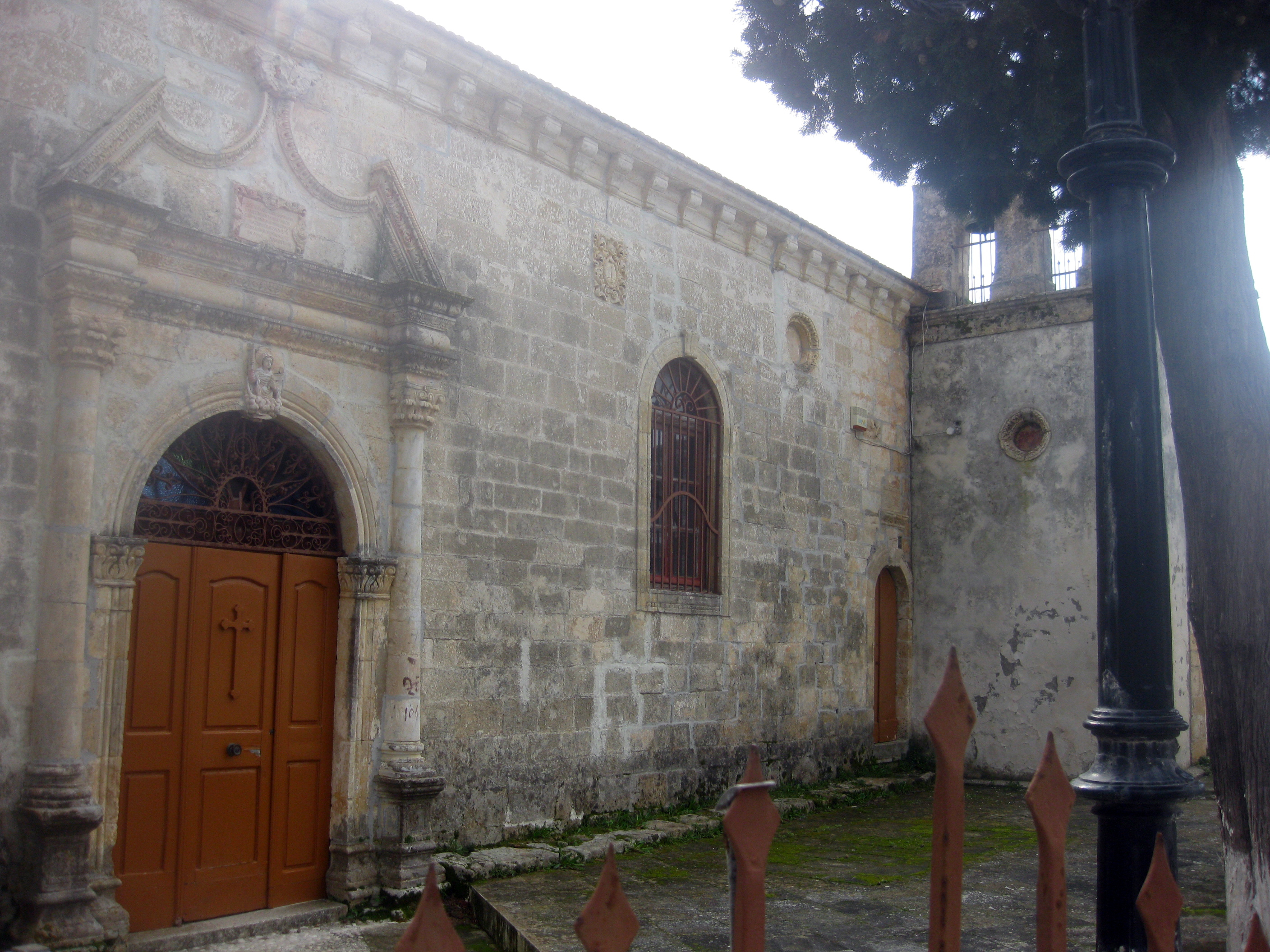
St. Marina in Soullaroi (Illari)

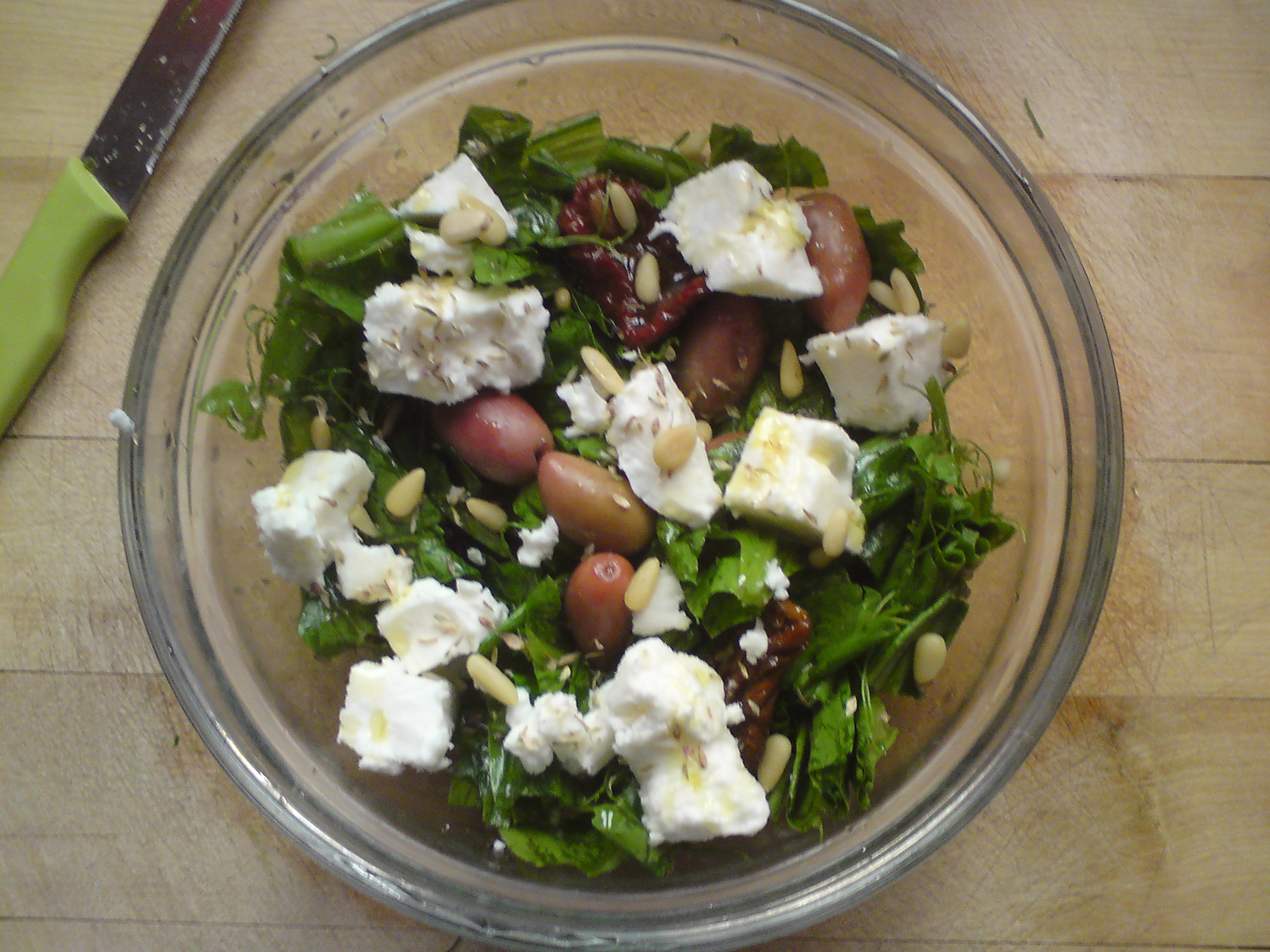
Salad from Cephalonia (local name "pissara")

== Reception ==
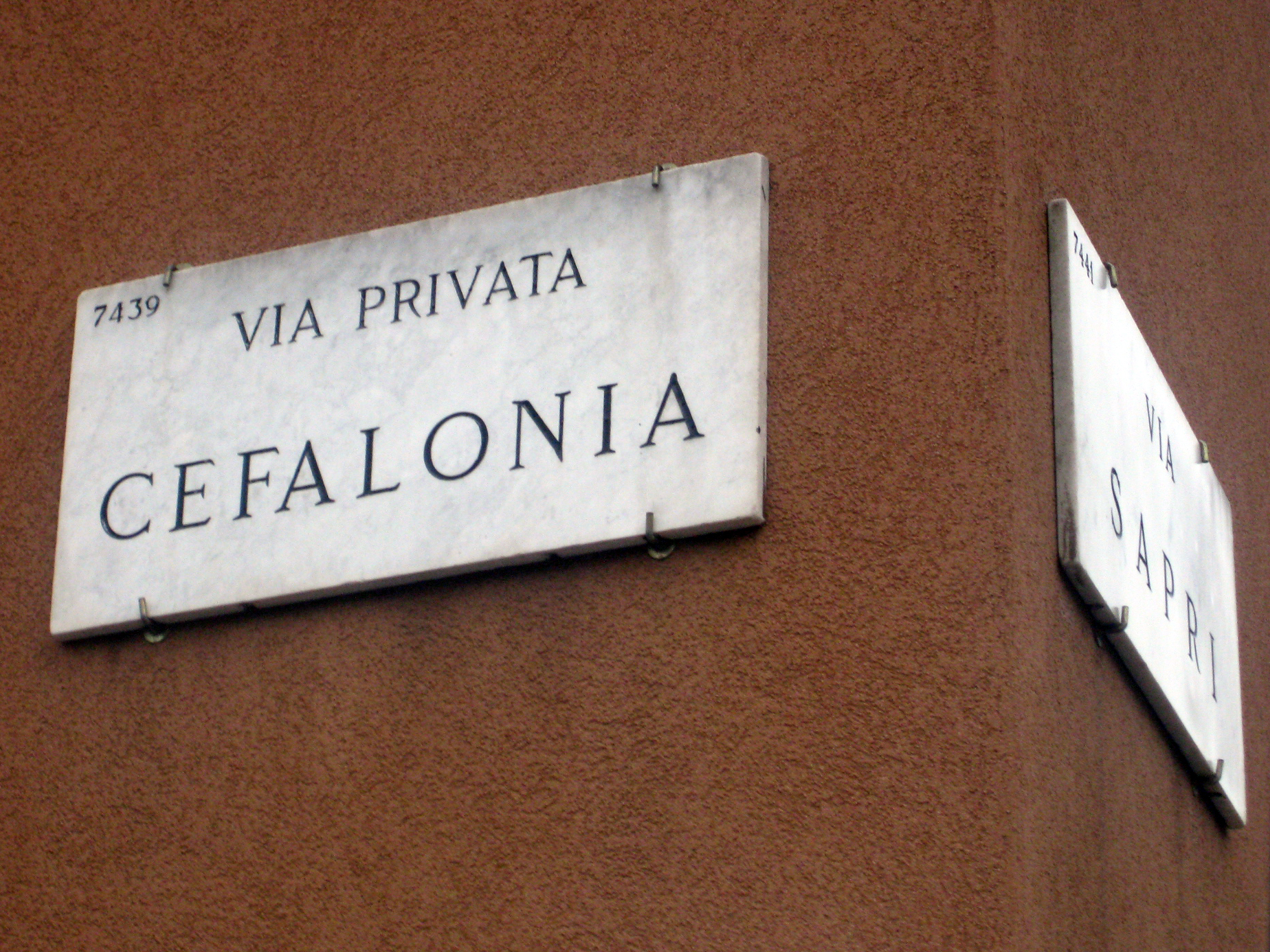
Via Privata Cefalonia in Milan

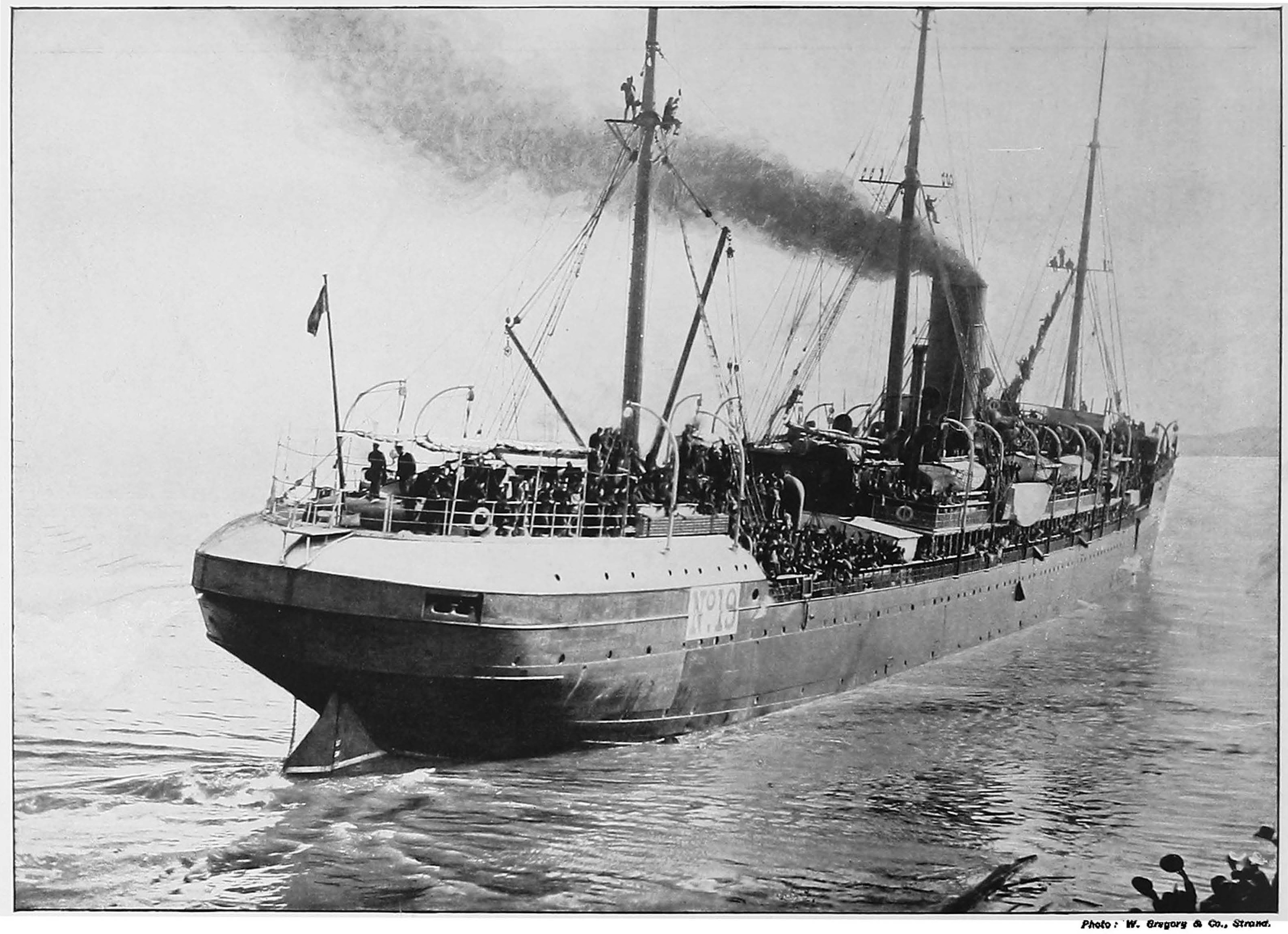
The Cunard ship Cephalonia, 1882

=== In popular culture ===
Cephalonia (spelt Kephallonia in game) is the home of Alexios and Kassandra, main characters of the videogame Assassin's Creed Odyssey (2018).

The 1994 novel Captain Corelli's Mandolin by Louis de Bernières, and the 2001 film adaptation of the same name, are primarily set in Cephalonia.

Albert Cohen’s novels also take place in Cephalonia, such as Solal (1930) or Mangeclous.

== See also ==
- Sacred snakes of Cephalonia
