= List of islands of Greece =

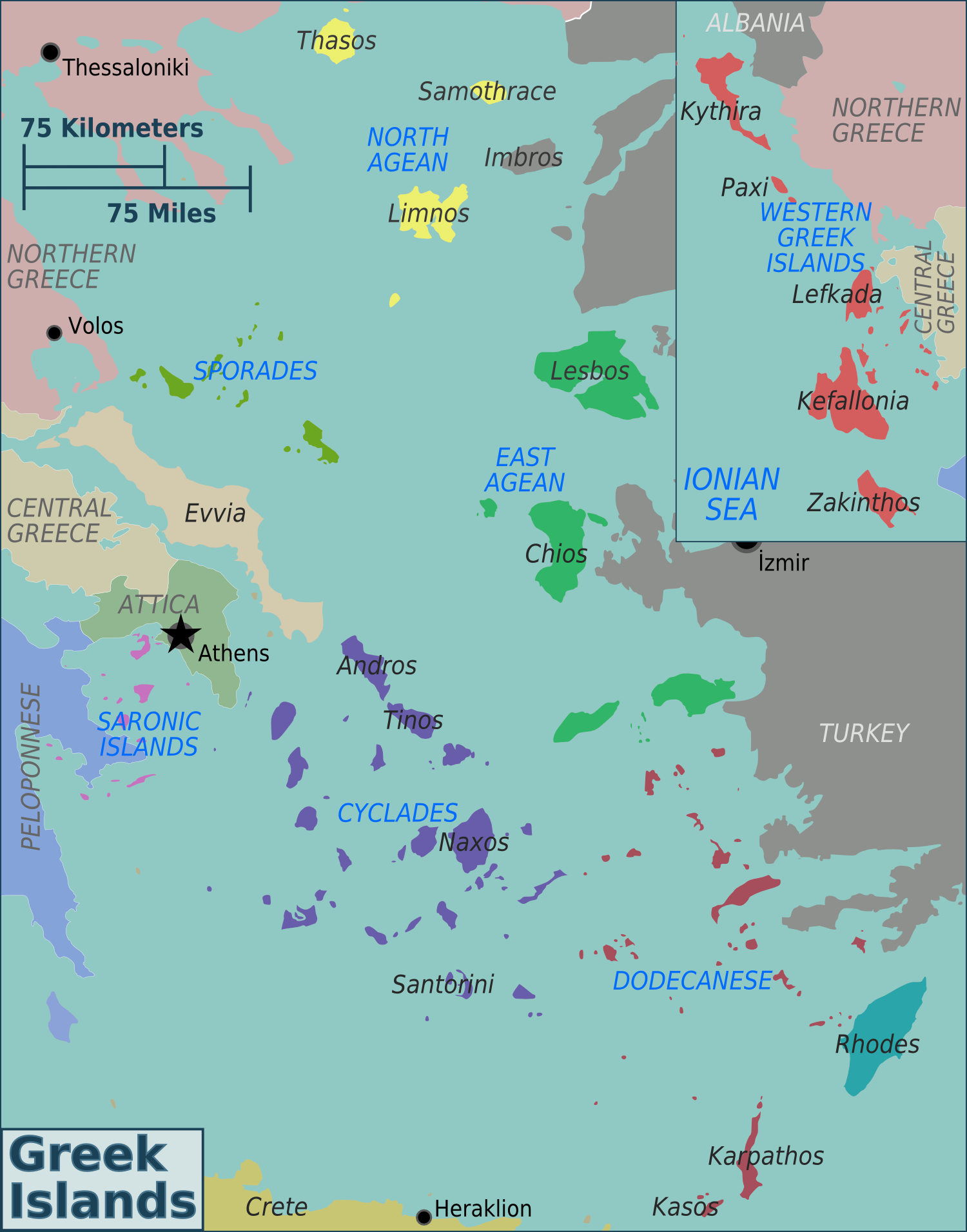
Regions of the Greek islands

Greece has many islands, (Note: In Greek: Island-Νησί (Nisi), Islet-Νησάκι (Nisáki)) with estimates ranging from somewhere around 1,200 to 6,000, depending on the minimum size to take into account. The number of inhabited islands is variously cited as between 166 and 227.

The largest Greek island by both area and population is Crete, located at the southern edge of the Aegean Sea. The second largest island in area is Euboea or Evia, which is separated from the mainland by the 60 m wide Euripus Strait, and is administered as part of the Central Greece region. After the third and fourth largest Greek islands, Lesbos and Rhodes, the rest of the islands are two-thirds of the area of Rhodes.

The Greek islands are traditionally grouped into the following clusters: the Saronic Islands (pink) in the Saronic Gulf near Athens; the Cyclades (purple), a large but dense collection occupying the central part of the Aegean Sea; the North Aegean islands (yellow, and emerald), a loose grouping off the west coast of Turkey; the Dodecanese (red), another loose collection in the southeast between Crete and Turkey; the Sporades (olive), a small tight group off the coast of Euboea; and the Ionian Islands (light red), chiefly located to the west of the mainland in the Ionian Sea. Crete with its surrounding islets and Euboea are traditionally excluded from this grouping.

Some Greek islands are often located off the coasts of modern countries whose shores were already inhabited by Greeks before antiquity, such as the coasts of Asia Minor and northern Epirus. It was only in the 20th century that the displacement of Greek populations led to a change in the ethnic landscape: today, Greek-populated islands are situated near regions now inhabited by other ethnic groups, such as in Turkey (Asia Minor) and southern Albania (Northern Epirus).

This article excludes the Peloponnese, which has technically been an island since the construction of the Corinth Canal in 1893, but is rarely considered to be an island due to its artificial origins.

== Islands of Greece by size ==
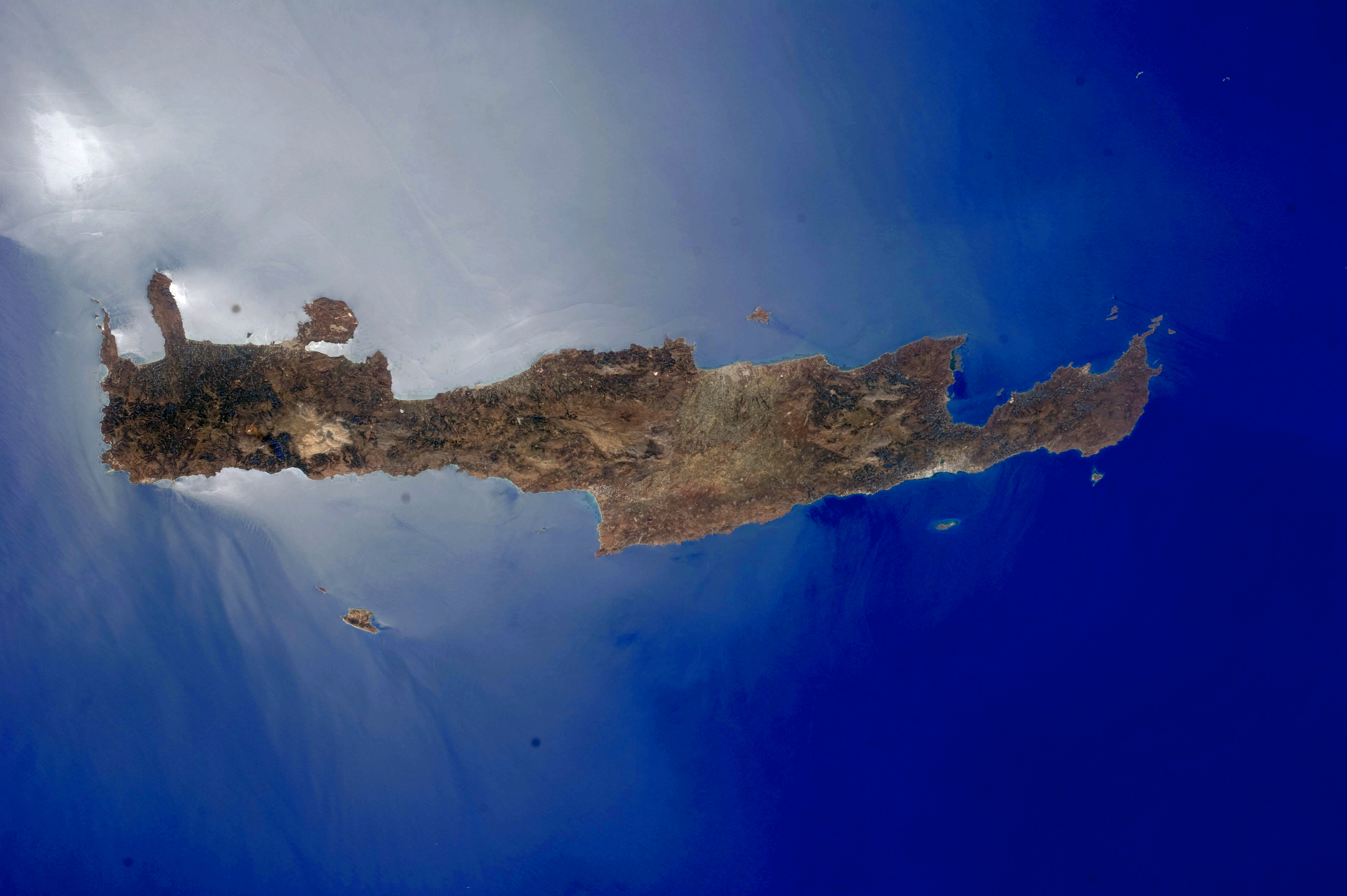
A NASA image of Crete

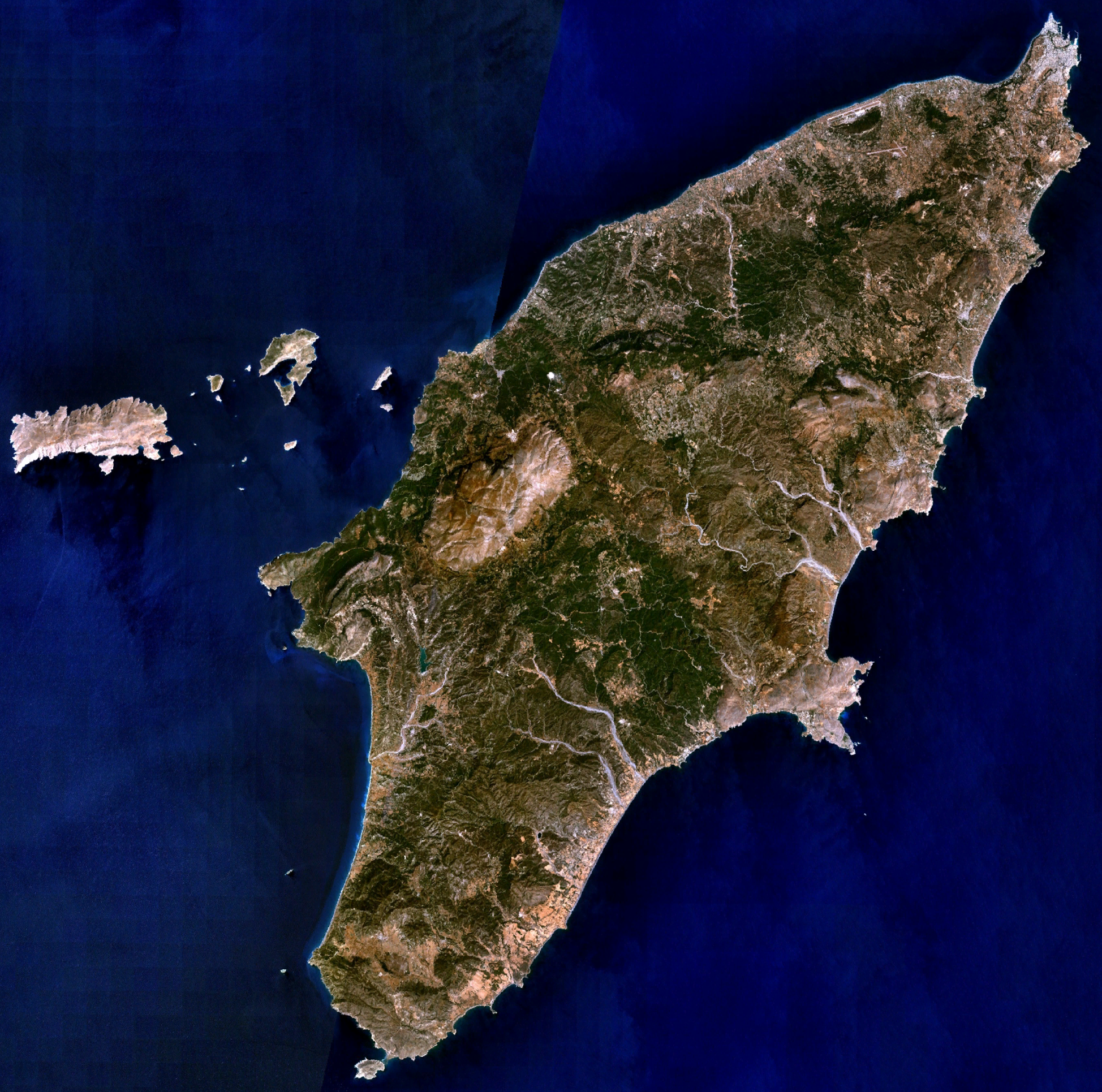
A NASA image of Rhodes

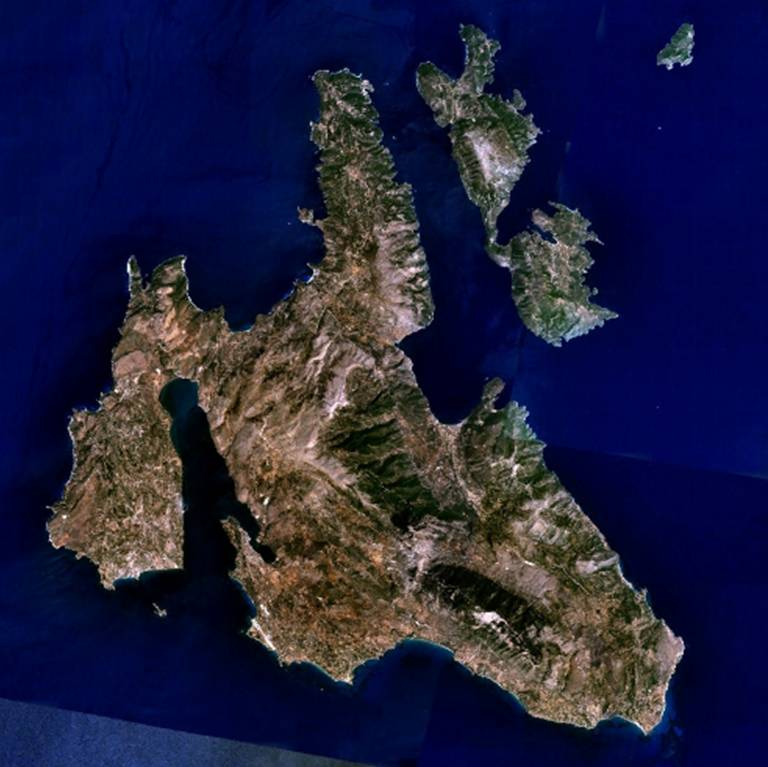
Ithaca is to the upper right of the larger Kefalonia island in this picture. The small island in the top-right corner is the uninhabited Atokos island.

The following are the 50 largest Greek islands listed by surface area.

	Island	Greek name	Area (km^{2})	Area (miles^{2})	Cluster
1	Crete	Κρήτη	8,336	3,219	Cretan
2	Euboea	Εύβοια	3,670	1,417	Euboean
3	Lesbos	Λέσβος	1,633	631	North Aegean Islands
4	Rhodes	Ρόδος	1,401	541	Dodecanese
5	Chíos	Χίος	842.3	325	North Aegean Islands
6	Kefalonia	Κεφαλονιά	781	302	Ionian Islands
7	Corfu	Κέρκυρα	592.9	229	Ionian Islands
8	Lemnos	Λήμνος	477.6	184	North Aegean Islands
9	Samos	Σάμος	477.4	184	North Aegean Islands
10	Naxos	Νάξος	429.8	166	Cyclades
11	Zakynthos	Ζάκυνθος	406	157	Ionian Islands
12	Thasos	Θάσος	380.1	147	North Aegean Islands
13	Andros	Άνδρος	380.0	147	Cyclades
14	Lefkada	Λευκάδα	303	117	Ionian Islands
15	Karpathos	Κάρπαθος	300	116	Dodecanese
16	Kos	Κως	290.3	112	Dodecanese
17	Kythira	Κύθηρα	279.6	108	Ionian Islands
18	Ikaria	Ικαρία	255	98	North Aegean Islands
19	Skyros	Σκύρος	209	81	Sporades
20	Paros	Πάρος	195	75	Cyclades
21	Tinos	Τήνος	194	75	Cyclades
22	Samothrace	Σαμοθράκη	178	69	North Aegean Islands
23	Milos	Μήλος	151	58	Cyclades
24	Kea	Κέα	132	51	Cyclades
25	Amorgos	Αμοργός	121	47	Cyclades
26	Kalymnos	Κάλυμνος	110	42	Dodecanese
27	Ios	Ίος	108	42	Cyclades
28	Kythnos	Κύθνος	99.4	38	Cyclades
29	Astypalaia	Αστυπάλαια	96.4	37	Dodecanese
30	Ithaca	Ιθάκη	96.2	37	Ionian Islands
31	Salamis	Σαλαμίνα	96.2	37	Argo-Saronic
32	Skopelos	Σκόπελος	96.2	37	Sporades
33	Mykonos	Μύκονος	85.5	33	Cyclades
34	Syros	Σύρος	83.6	32	Cyclades
35	Aegina	Αίγινα	82.6	32	Argo-Saronic
36	Santorini	Σαντορίνη	76.2	29	Cyclades
37	Serifos	Σέριφος	75.2	29	Cyclades
38	Sifnos	Σίφνος	73.9	29	Cyclades
39	Kasos	Κάσος	69.5	27	Dodecanese
40	Alonnisos	Αλόννησος	64.1	25	Sporades
41	Tilos	Τήλος	61.5	24	Dodecanese
42	Symi	Σύμη	57.8	22	Dodecanese
43	Leros	Λέρος	54	21	Dodecanese
44	Hydra	Ύδρα	49.6	19	Argo-Saronic
45	Skiathos	Σκιάθος	47.3	18	Sporades
46	Agios Efstratios	Άγιος Ευστράτιος	43.3	17	North Aegean Islands
47	Sikinos	Σίκινος	41.6	16	Cyclades
48	Nisyros	Νίσυρος	41.2	16	Dodecanese
49	Psara	Ψαρά	40.4	16	North Aegean Islands
50	Anafi	Ανάφη	38.6	15	Cyclades

== Islands of Greece by population ==
Island	Population
Crete	624,408
Euboea	191,206
Rhodes	125,113
Corfu	99,134
Lesbos	83,755
Chios	50,361
Zakynthos	41,180
Salamis	37,220
Kos	37,089
Kefalonia	36,064
Samos	32,642
Lefkada	21,900
Syros	21,507
Naxos	20,578
Kalymnos	17,752
Lemnos	16,411
Santorini	15,480
Paros	14,520
Thasos	13,104
Aegina	12,911
Mykonos	10,704
Tinos	8,934
Ikaria	8,843
Andros	8,826
Leros	7,992
Karpathos	6,567
Skiathos	5,802
Milos	5,302
Skopelos	4,960
Aitoliko	4,518
Spetses	3,748
Kythira	3,644
Patmos	3,283
Poros	3,261
Alonnisos	3,138
Skyros	3,052
Ithaca	2,862
Sifnos	2,777
Symi	2,603
Samothrace	2,596
Paxos	2,466
Kea	2,335
Ios	2,299
Hydra	2,070
Amorgos	1,961
Kythnos	1,586
Astypalaia	1,376
Fournoi Korseon	1,343
Antiparos	1,265
Serifos	1,241
Kasos	1,223
Agistri	1,131
Nisiros	1,046
Meganisi	926
Oinousses	911
Elafonisos	898
Kimolos	810
Leipsoi	778
Tilos	746
Folegandros	719
Kastellorizo	584
Ammouliani	521
Halki	475
Ereikoussa	447
Psara	420
Koufonisia	391
Othonoi	386
Kalamos	342
Anafi	293
Agios Efstratios	257
Sikinos	253
Therasia	249
Schoinoussa	227
Donousa	213
Agathonisi	202
Thymaina	191
Mathraki	174
Gavdos	142

== Islands of the Aegean Sea ==
=== Argo-Saronic Islands ===
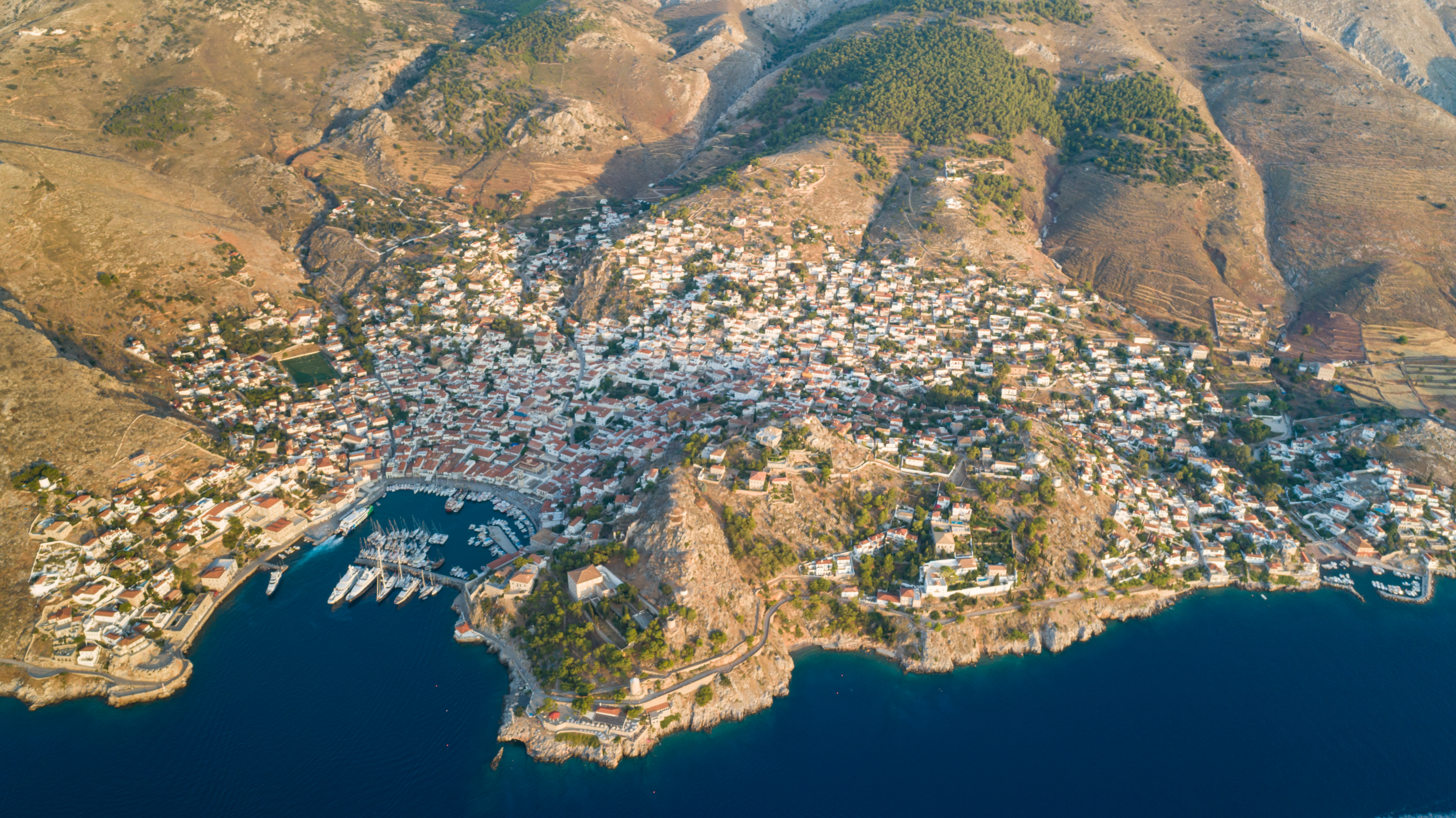
The port city of Hydra on Hydra Island

This list includes Argo-Saronic islands, which are located in the Saronic Gulf. The largest Argo-Saronic island is Salamis. The names of the main islands are in bold. Uninhabited islands are indicated, including those that may have been inhabited in the past:

- **Aegina** (87.41 km^{2} (33.75 sq mi)), 37°43′48″N 23°29′24″E
- Agios Georgios (uninhabited), 37°28′26″N 23°55′34″E
- Agios Georgios Salaminos (St. George's Island, uninhabited), 37°57′47″N 23°32′22″E
- Agios Ioannis Diaporion (uninhabited)
- Agios Thomas Diaporion (uninhabited), 37°48′37.30″N 23°14′46.40″E
- **Agistri** (13.37 km^{2} (5.16 sq mi)), 37°42′N 23°20′E
- Alexandros Hydras, 37°17′03″N 23°22′08″E
- Atalanti Island, 37°56′06″N 23°34′21″E
- Dia (uninhabited)
- **Dokos** (13.537 km^{2} (5.227 sq mi)), 37°19′59.21″N 23°19′16.82″E
- Falkonera (uninhabited), 36°50′31″N 23°53′06″E
- Fleves (uninhabited), 37°46′10″N 23°45′44″E
- **Hydra** (64.443 km^{2} (24.882 sq mi)), 37°20′06″N 23°28′21″E
- Katramoniso (Nisís Idhroúsa, uninhabited), 37°50′08″N 23°44′44″E
- Kyra Aiginis (Nisída Kyrá) (uninhabited), 37°42′12″N 23°15′44″E
- Laousses Islets (Nísoi Laoúses, uninhabited), 37°49′06″N 23°27′27″E
- Leros Salaminos (uninhabited), 37°59′33″N 23°32′17″E
- Modi Porou (uninhabited), 37°30′37″N 23°31′52″E
- Moni Aiginas (uninhabited), 37°41′31″N 23°26′06″E
- Patroklos (uninhabited), 37°39′02.50″N 23°57′01.50″E
- Pera Island (Arta), 37°53′46″N 23°29′54″E
- Platia (uninhabited), 37°48′41″N 23°22′59″E
- Platia Aeginis (uninhabited), 37°34′34″N 23°30′26″E
- **Poros** (49.582 km^{2} (19.144 sq mi)), 37°31′N 23°29′E
- Psili (uninhabited)
- Psyttaleia (uninhabited), 37°56′24″N 23°35′17″E
- Revythousa (uninhabited), 37°57′41″N 23°24′05″E
- Romvi (Nisida Romvi) (uninhabited), 37°30′34″N 22°51′54″E
- **Salamis** (96.16 km^{2} (37.13 sq mi)), 37°56′N 23°30′E
- **Spetses** (27.121 km^{2} (10.471 sq mi)), 37°15′N 23°08′E
- Spetsopoula (uninhabited), 37°13′N 23°10′E
- Stavronisi Hydras (uninhabited), 37°15′13″N 23°26′46″E
- Trikeri Hydras (uninhabited), 37°16′01″N 23°16′55″E
- Velopoula (Nisída Velopoúla) (uninhabited), 36°54′58″N 23°27′41″E
- Ypsili Diaporion (uninhabited)
- Ypsili Argolidos (uninhabited)

=== Cretan islands ===
The two lists below show the islands, islets, and rocks that surround the island of Crete that are in the Aegean Sea or Libyan Sea.

==== Cretan islands of the Aegean Sea ====
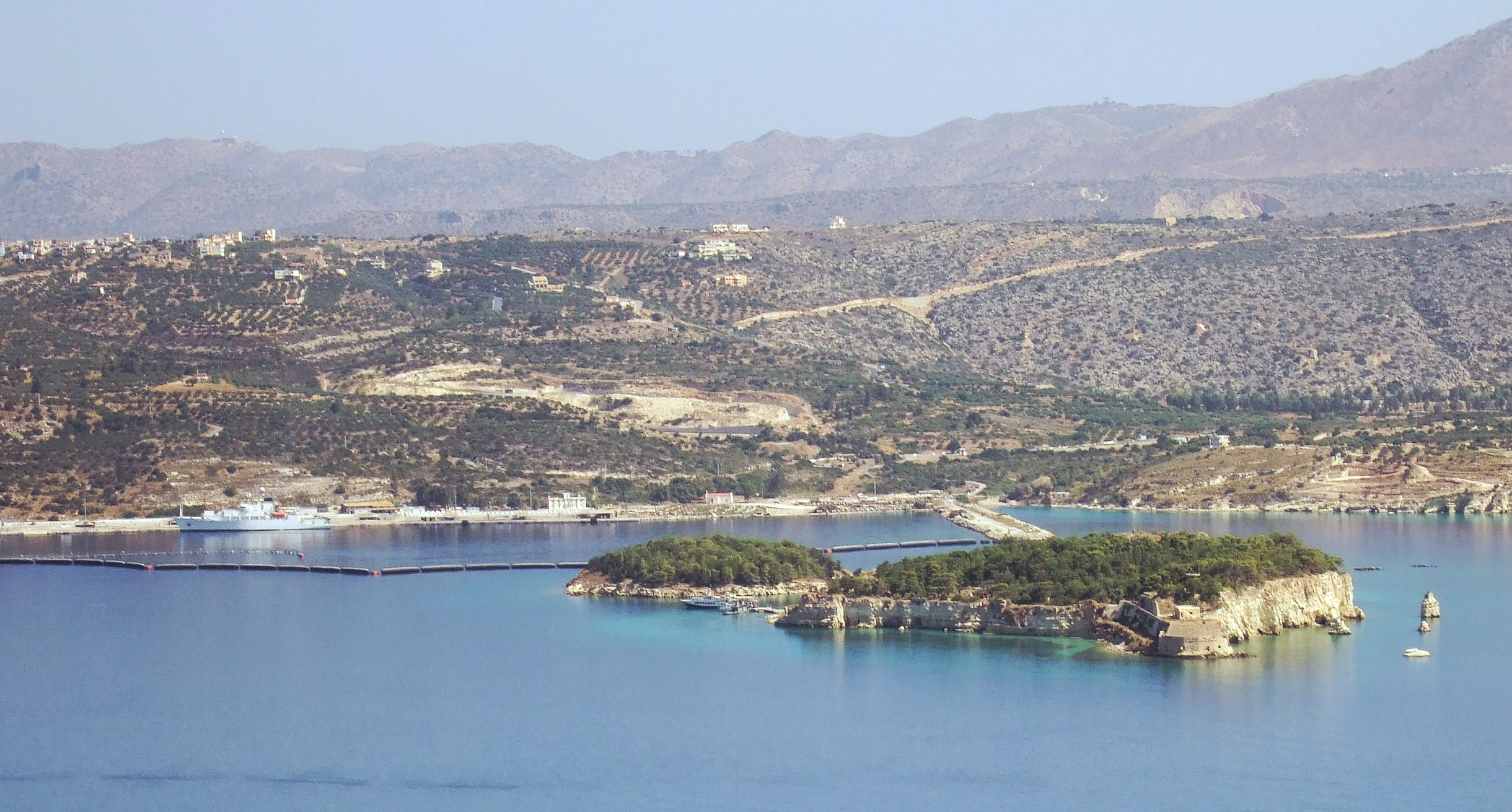
The islet of Leon, on the left, next to the larger islet of Souda, within Souda Bay

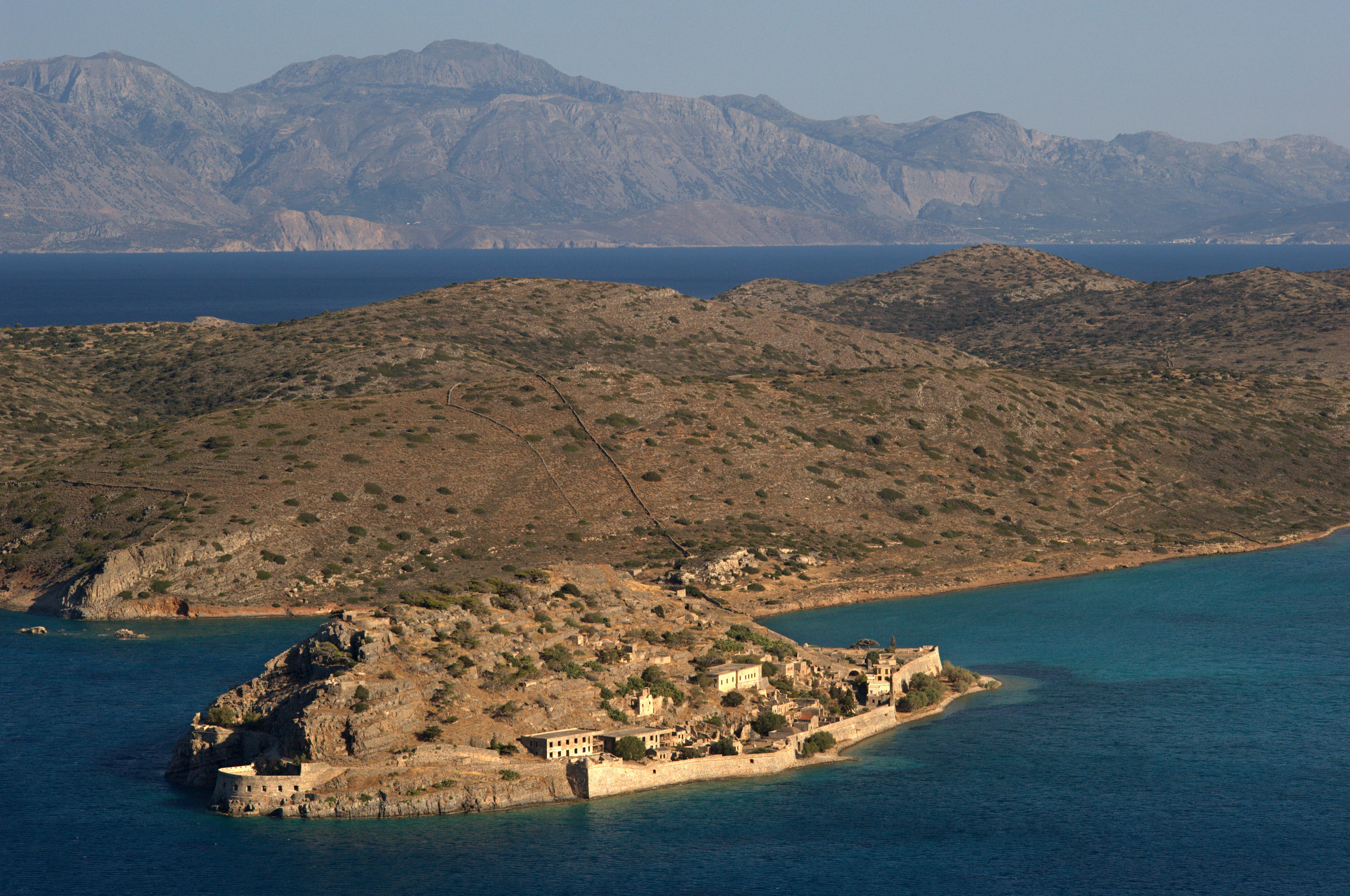
Spinalonga (Kalydon)

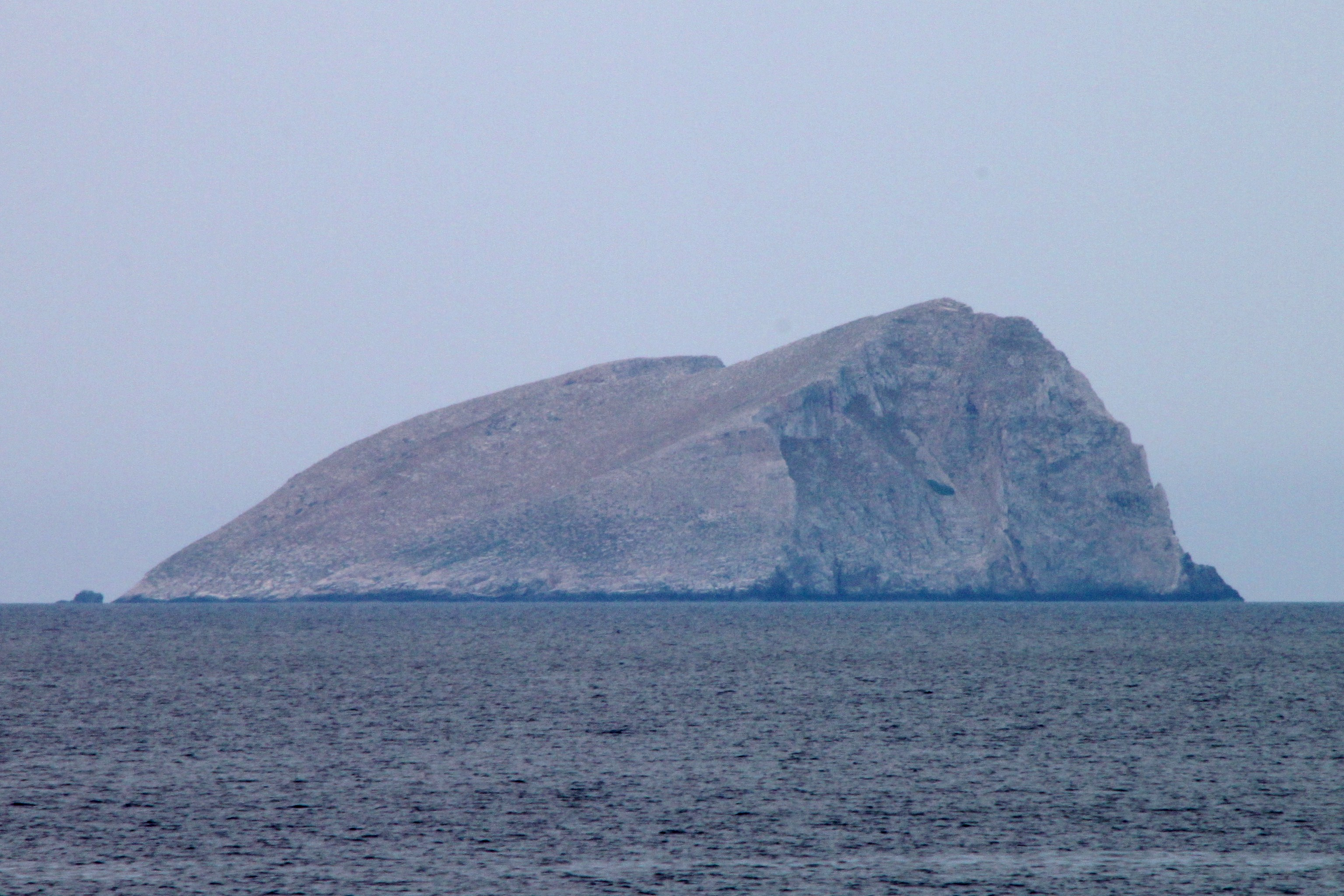
The islet of Pondikonisi, or mouse island, is shaped like a mouse.

- Afendis Christos, 35°17′43″N 25°27′39″E
- Agia Varvara, 35°17′51″N 25°28′04″E
- Agioi Apostoloi, 35°31′09″N 23°59′59″E
- Agioi Pandes, 35°11′53″N 25°43′51″E
- Agioi Theodoroi, 35°32′13″N 23°55′52″E
- Agios Nikolaos, 35°21′57″N 24°15′49″E
- Agriomandra, 35°07′53″N 25°49′53″E
- Anavatis, 35°01′46″N 26°13′37″E
- Arnaouti, 35°36′12″N 23°34′42″E
- Avgo (uninhabited islet), 35°36′11″N 25°34′37″E
- Crete, 35°12.6′N 24°54.6′E
- Daskaleia (uninhabited islet), 35°18′01″N 26°18′37″E
- Dia (Zeus, uninhabited), 35°26′53″N 25°13′12″E
- Diapori, 35°25′18″N 24°52′32″E
- Dionysades (group of islands), 35°21′N 26°11′E
  - Gianysada, 35°19′41″N 26°10′26″E
  - Dragonada, 35°20′42″N 26°10′41″E
  - Paximada, 35°22′37″N 26°10′26″E
  - Paximadaki, 35°21′29″N 26°10′41″E
- Elasa, 35°16′23″N 26°20′24″E
- Ftena Trachylia, 35°18′56″N 26°17′14″E
- Glaronisi, 35°27′48″N 25°11′27″E
- Gramvoussa, 35°36′40″N 23°34′45″E
  - Agria Gramvousa, 35°38′32″N 23°35′12″E
  - Imeri Gramvousa, 35°36′40″N 23°34′44″E
- Grandes (group of islands), 35°12′22″N 26°17′53″E
- Kalydon (Spinalonga), 35°17′51″N 25°44′17″E
- Karavi (uninhabited), 35°18′27″N 26°19′10″E
- Karga (uninhabited), 35°27′18″N 24°11′38″E
- Katergo (uninhabited), 35°09′25″N 25°50′51″E
- Kavaloi (three uninhabited islands), 35°01′44″N 26°13′52″E
  - Anavatis, 35°01′46″N 26°13′37″E
  - Kavallos, 35°01′38″N 26°13′42″E
  - Kefali, 35°01′50″N 26°14′08″E
- Kolokytha, 35°15′50″N 25°45′36″E
- Koursaroi, 35°28′54″N 23°33′52″E
- Kyriamadi (Peninsula), 35°17′42″N 26°17′35″E
- Lazaretta, 35°31′09″N 23°59′58″E
- Leon (Islet), 35°29′27″N 24°09′02″E
- Mavros (Uninhabited islet), 35°16′02″N 26°13′19″E
- Megatzedes (Uninhabited islet), 35°16′24″N 26°13′25″E
- Mochlos, 35°11′15″N 25°54′27″E
- Nikolos, 35°12′16″N 25°43′20″E
- Palaiosouda (Islet), 35°29′56″N 24°10′44″E
- Peristeri (Islet), 35°24′53″N 24°49′35″E
- Peristerovrachoi (Uninhabited rocks), 35°15′21″N 26°16′01″E
- Petalida (Islet), 35°36′02″N 23°35′22″E
- Petalouda (Uninhabited islet), 35°36′12″N 23°34′42″E
- Pontikaki (Uninhabited islet), 35°34′54″N 23°28′21″E
- Pondikonisi (Uninhabited islet), 35°35′10″N 23°28′37″E
- Praso Kissamou (Islet), 35°28′27″N 23°33′22″E
- Prosfora (Uninhabited islet), 35°13′40″N 26°06′18″E
- Pseira, 35°11′25″N 25°51′35″E
- Sideros (Uninhabited rock), 35°18′32″N 26°18′04″E
- Souda (Islet), 35°29′20″N 24°09′07″E
- Valenti (Rock), 35°35′41″N 23°34′30″E
- Vryonisi (Uninhabited islet), 35°07′47″N 25°45′46″E

==== Cretan islands of the Libyan Sea ====
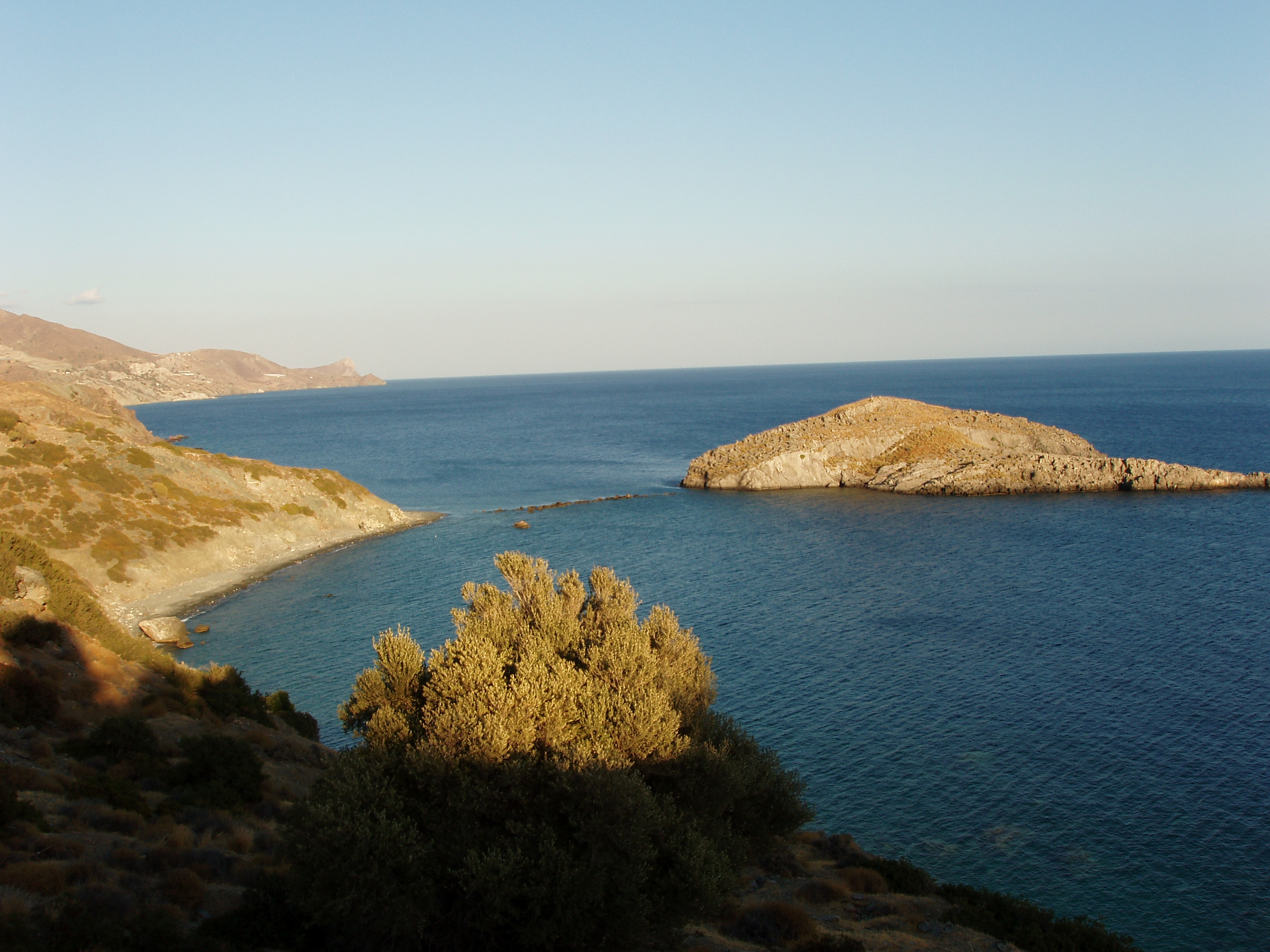
The islet of Trafos in the Libyan Sea

Islands on the south coast of Crete are considered in the Libyan Sea.

- Agia Eirini, 35°02′05″N 25°58′27″E
- Ammoudi tous Volakous, 35°11′32″N 24°08′36″E
- Artemis (Uninhabited islet), 35°16′00″N 23°32′21″E
- Aspros Volakas (rock), 35°05′48″N 24°37′01″E
- Chrysi (uninhabited), 34°52′N 25°43′E
- Elafonisi, 35°16′12″N 23°31′55″E
- Fotia (Uninhabited islet), 35°00′50″N 25°52′26″E
- Gaidouronisi (Uninhabited), 34°52′N 25°43′E
- Gavdopoula, 34°53′N 24°01′E
- Gavdos (Southernmost point of Greece), 34°50′N 24°05′E
- Koufonisi (Lefki) (Uninhabited islet), 34°56′13″N 26°08′20″E
- Loutro (Rocky islet), 35°11′48″N 24°04′58″E
- Makroulo (Uninhabited islet), 34°57′11″N 26°07′41″E
- Marmaro (Uninhabited islet), 34°56′55″N 26°07′39″E
- Mavros Volakas (Large rock), 35°05′48″N 24°37′01″E
- Megalonisi (Uninhabited islet), 34°55′23″N 24°48′00″E
- Mikronisi (Islet), 34°55′39″N 24°48′22″E
- Papadoplaka (Reef islet), 34°55′10″N 24°47′09″E
- Paximadia (Two small uninhabited islands), 35°00′29″N 24°35′28″E
- Prasonisi, Gavdou (Islet), 35°00′29″N 24°35′28″E
- Prasonisi, Rethymno (Islet), 35°05′50″N 24°35′43″E
- Psarocharako (Rock), 34°58′52″N 25°30′08″E
- Psyllos (Uninhabited islet), 35°06′55″N 25°48′07″E
- Schistonisi (Islet), 35°13′18″N 23°40′18″E
- Strongyli (Uninhabited islet), 34°57′29″N 26°07′59″E
- Thetis (Islet), 34°57′13″N 25°09′26″E
- Trachilos (Uninhabited islet), 34°55′08″N 26°07′52″E
- Trafos (Islet), 34°56′12″N 24°49′29″E
- Treis Volakous (Rocks), 35°12′00″N 24°07′58″E

=== Cyclades islands ===
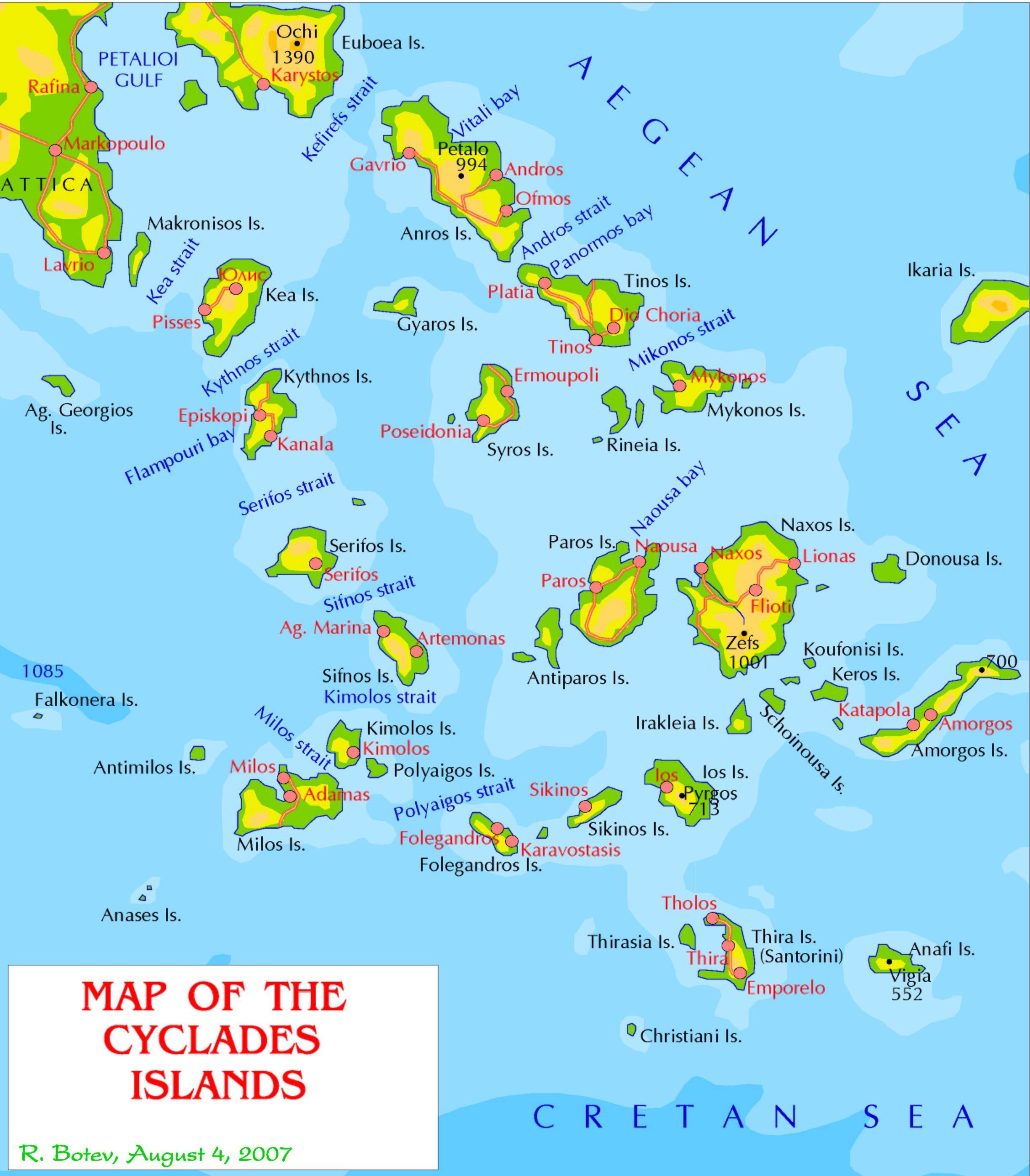
The Cyclades islands

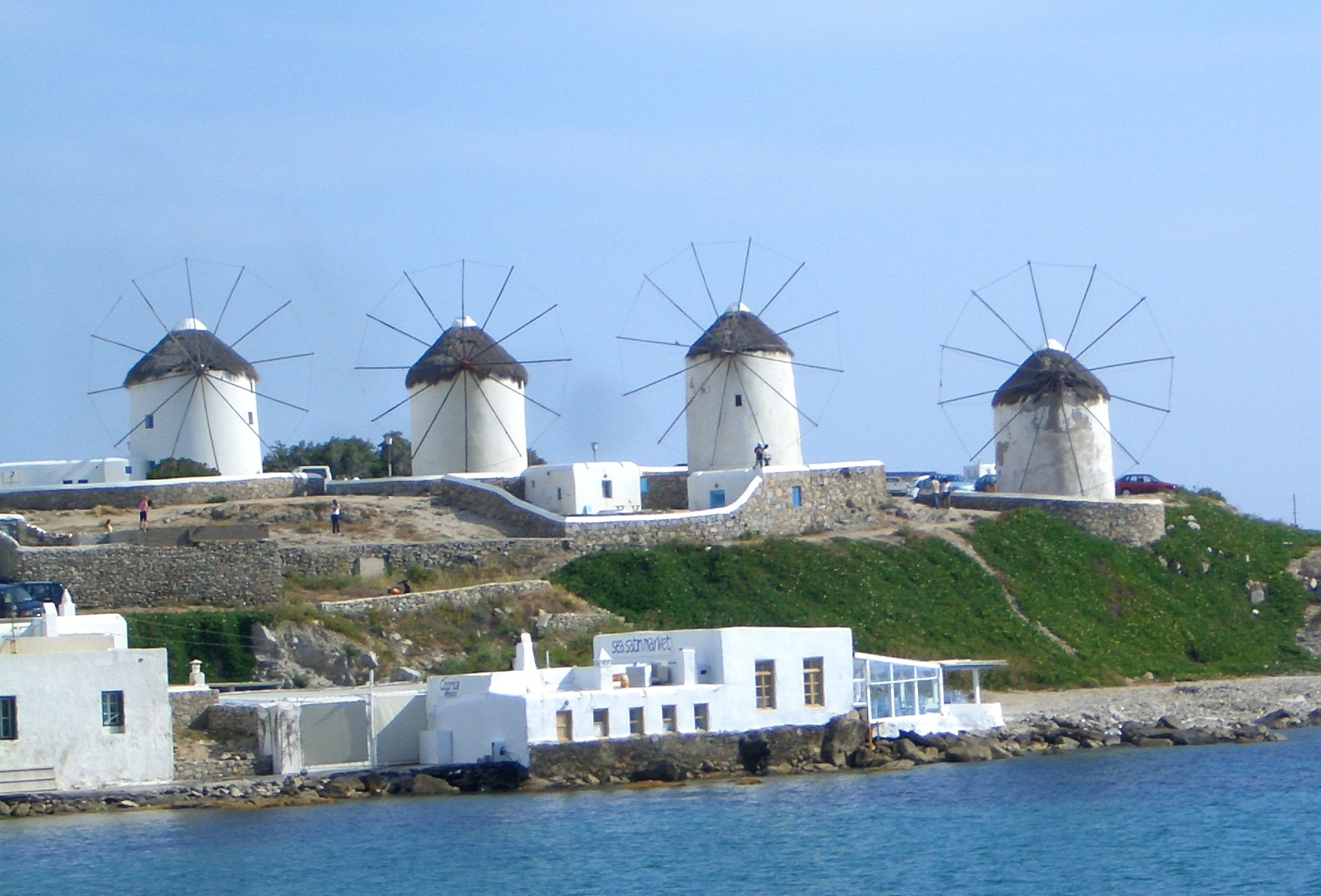
Iconic windmills of Mykonos

The Cyclades islands comprise around 220 islands and islets. The main islands are indicated in bold below.

- Ágios Nikólaos (Máchaires), 37°05′09″N 25°41′46″E
- Prasíni (Agía Paraskeví), 37°04′48″N 25°42′21″E
- Strongyló (Strongylí), 37°04′10″N 25°42′17″E
- **Amorgos** (141 km^{2} (54 sq mi)), 36°51′N 25°54′E
- Ananes, 36°33′06″N 24°08′46″E
- **Anafi** (40.4 km^{2} (15.6 sq mi)), 36°22′01″N 25°46′59″E
- **Andros** (380 km^{2} (150 sq mi)), 37°50′11″N 24°53′53″E
- Aniros (Anydros)
- Ano Antikeros
- Antimilos, 36°47′13″N 24°14′19″E
- **Antiparos**, 37°0′34″N 25°3′39″E
- Anydros Amorgou
- Askania, 36°14′05″N 25°12′48″E
- Christiana (uninhabited), 36°15′N 25°12′E
- **Delos**, 37°23′36″N 25°16′16″E
- Despotiko (uninhabited), 36°58′N 25°00′E
- **Donousa** (13.8 km^{2} (5.3 sq mi)), 37°06′0″N 25°48′59″E
- Eschati, 36°13′16″N 25°13′43″E
- **Folegandros** (32.2 km^{2} (12.4 sq mi)), 36°37′N 24°54′E
- Glaronisi, 37°35′09″N 24°45′06″E
- **Gyaros**, 37°37′38″N 24°43′12″E
- Hristiana
- Htapodia Mykonou
- **Ios** (108 km^{2} (42 sq mi)), 36°43′0″N 25°20′11″E
- **Iraklia**, 36°50′N 25°27′E
- Kalogiros
- Kardiotissa, 36°38′N 25°01′E
- Kato Antikeros, 36°50′47″N 25°41′00″E
- Kato Koufonisi, 36°54′48″N 25°34′50″E
- **Kea** (132 km^{2} (51 sq mi)), 37°37′23″N 24°20′12″E
- **Keros**, 36°53′N 25°39′E
- **Kimolos**, 36°48′31″N 24°33′47″E
- Kitriani, 36°54′13″N 24°43′34″E
- **Koufonisia**, 36°56′N 25°36′E
- Kramvonisi
- **Kythnos** (99.4 km^{2} (38.4 sq mi)), 37°23′9″N 24°25′41″E
- Liadi Island, 36°54′13″N 26°10′04″E
- Makares, 37°04′37″N 25°42′02″E
- **Makronissos**, 37°42′04″N 24°07′29″E
- Megalo, 37°50′55″N 24°45′02″E
- **Milos** (151 km^{2} (58 sq mi)), 36°41′N 24°25′E
- **Mykonos**, 37°27′32″N 25°21′51″E
- **Naxos** (429.8 km^{2} (165.9 sq mi)), 37°05′15″N 25°24′14″E
- Nea Kameni, 36°24′N 25°24′E
- Nikouria, 36°53′08″N 25°54′32″E
- Nisida Prasini, 37°04′46″N 25°42′21″E
- Ofidousa, 36°32′44″N 26°08′42″E
- Pahia Anaphis
- Palea Kameni, 36°23′51″N 25°22′46″E
- **Paros** (195 km^{2} (75 sq mi)), 37°4′N 25°12′E
- **Polyaigos**, 36°45′5″N 24°38′11″E
- Rhineia, 37°24′32″N 25°13′44″E
- Saliagos, 37°02′53″N 25°05′38″E
- **Santorini** (Thera), 36°25′N 25°26′E
- **Schoinoussa**, 36°52′N 25°31′E
- Serifopoula, 37°15′22″N 24°36′00″E
- **Serifos**, 37°09′N 24°30′E
- **Sifnos**, 36°59′21″N 24°40′7″E
- **Sikinos**, 36°40′32″N 25°6′58″E
- Skilonisi, 37°07′32″N 25°50′00″E
- Stroggyli Parou, 36°57′00″N 24°57′40″E
- **Syros**, 37°26′18″N 24°54′44″E
- **Therasia**, 36°26′N 25°20′E
- **Tinos** (194 km^{2} (75 sq mi)), 37°36′48″N 25°08′21″E
- Vous, 37°08′31″N 24°33′43″E
- Vrachoi Bouvais, 37°13′47″N 25°55′24″E

=== Dodecanese islands ===
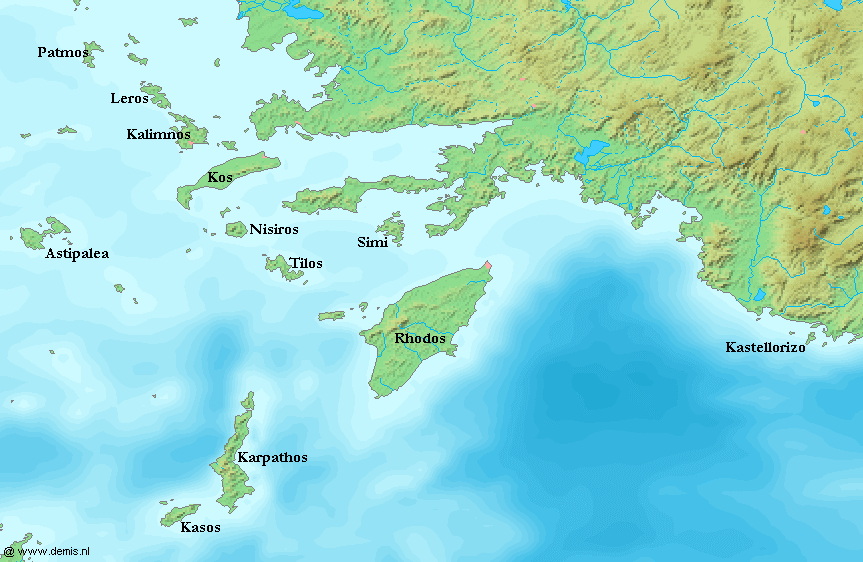
The Dodecanese Islands

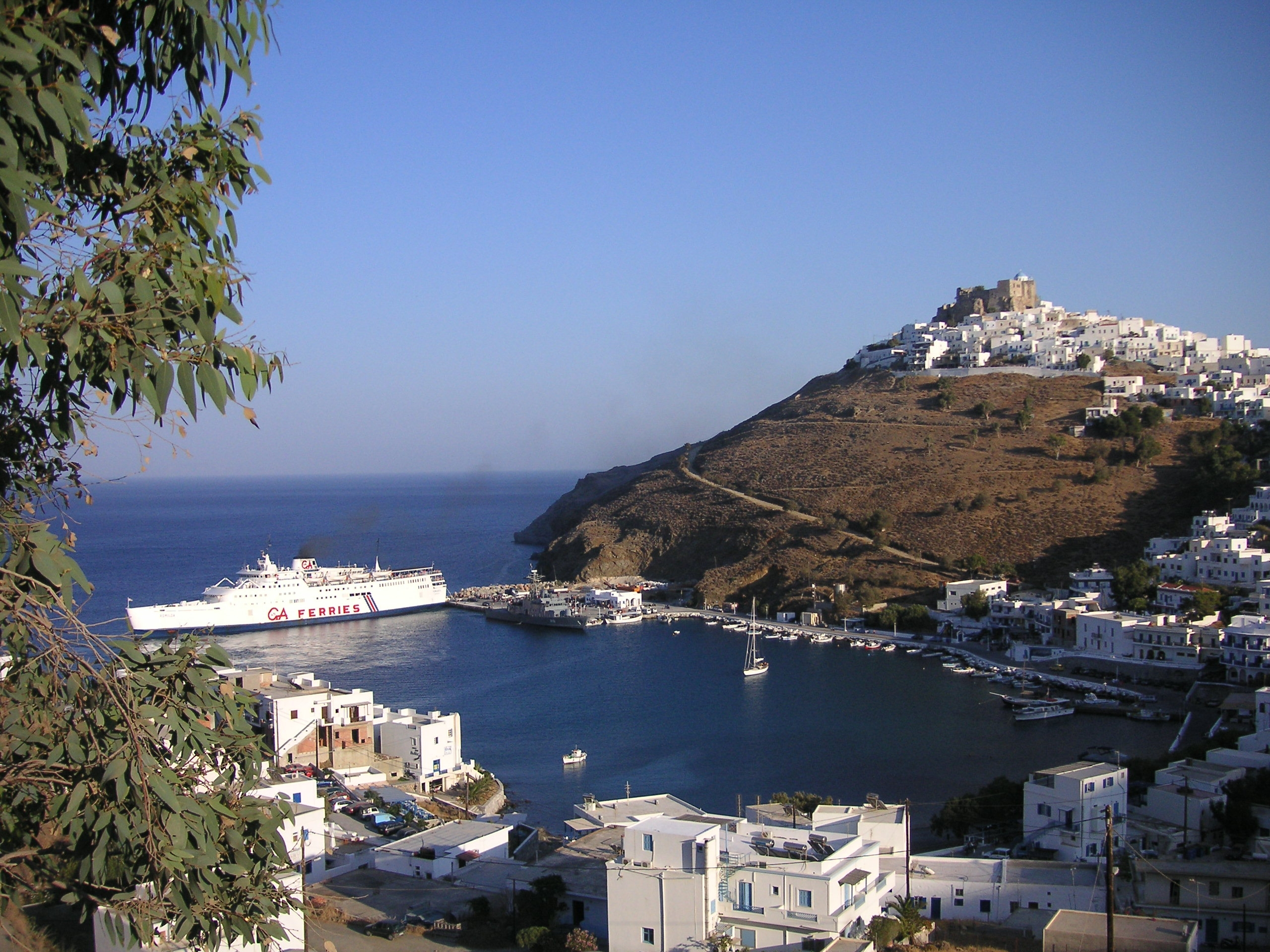
A harbor on the island of Astypalaia

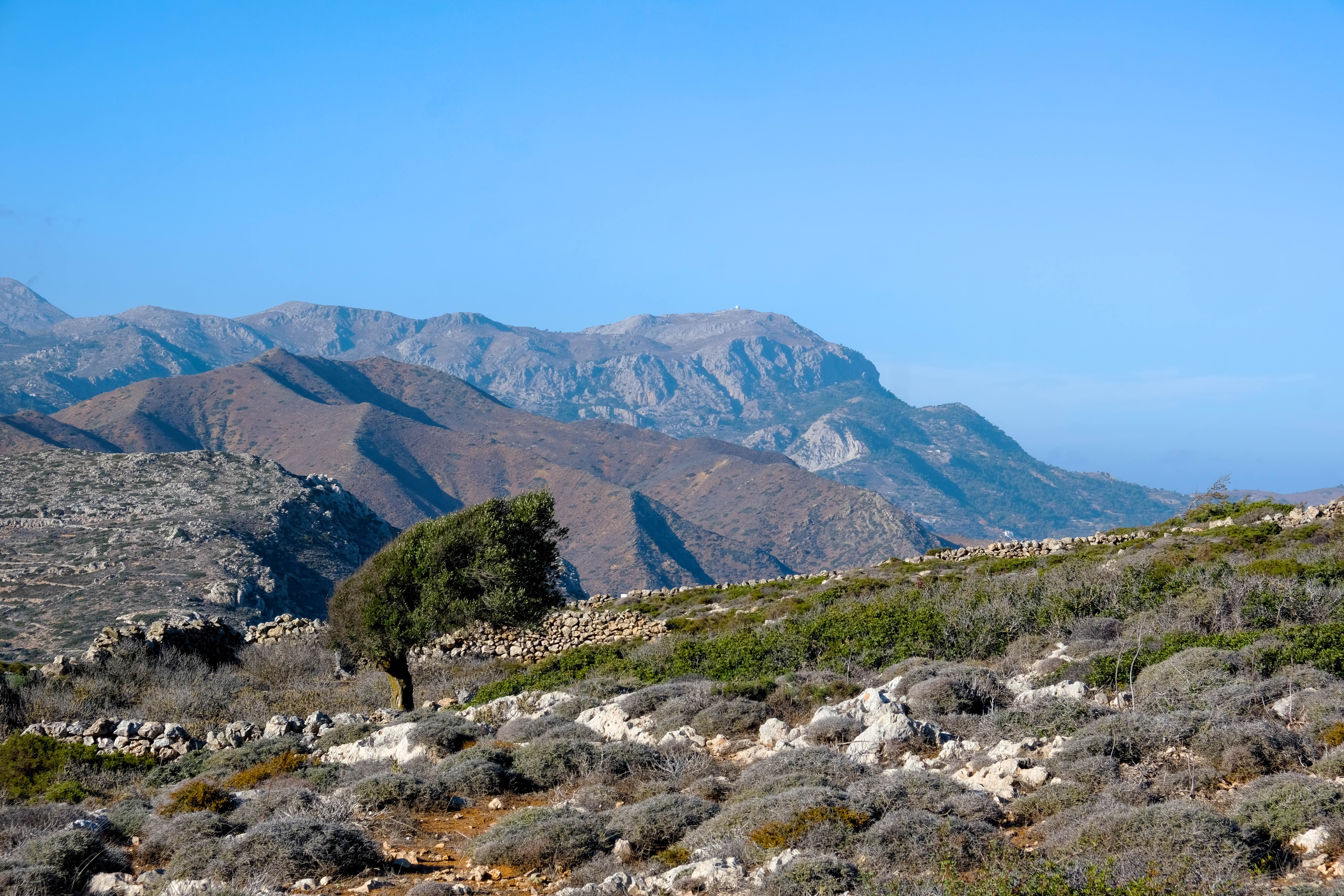
Landscape on Karpathos

There are 164 total Dodecanese Islands of which 26 are inhabited. There are 12 main islands, listed in bold below:

- Agathonissi, 37°27.5′N 26°58′E
- Agioi Theodoroi Halkis
- Agios Antonios Nisyrou
- Agreloussa
- Alimia, 36°16′N 27°42′E
- Antitilos
- Anydros Patmou
- Arefoussa
- Arhangelos
- Arkoi, 37°23′N 26°44′E
- Armathia, 35°26′12″N 26°51′49″E
- Astakida
- **Astypalaia**, 36°33′N 26°21′E
- Faradonesia
- Farmakonisi, 37°17′N 27°05′E
- Fokionissia
- Fragos
- Gaidourosnissi Tilou
- Glaros Kinarou
- Gyali, 36°39′43″N 27°06′54″E
- Halavra
- Halki, 36°14′N 27°34′E
- Hiliomodi Patmou
- Hondro
- Htenies
- Imia (uninhabited), 37°03′03″N 27°09′04″E
- Kalavros Kalymnou
- Kalolimnos, 37°03′40″N 27°05′15″E
- Kalovolos
- **Kalymnos**, 36°59′24″N 26°59′06″E
- Kamilonisi
- Kandeloussa
- Karavolas Rodhou
- **Karpathos** (300 km^{2} (120 sq mi)), 35°35′N 27°08′E
- **Kasos**, 35°23′51″N 26°55′30″E
- **Kastellorizo** (Megisti), 36°08′42″N 29°35′06″E
- Kinaros, 36°58′49″N 26°17′23″E
- **Kos** (290.3 km^{2} (112.1 sq mi)), 36°51′N 27°14′E
- Koubelonisi
- Kouloundros
- Kouloura Leipson
- Kounoupoi
- Koutsomytis
- Leipsoi, 37°18′N 26°45′E
- **Leros**, 37°09′N 26°51′E
- Levitha, 37°00′40″N 26°27′35″E
- Makronisi Leipson
- Makronissi Kasou
- Makry Aspronisi Leipson
- Makry Halkis
- Marathos, 37°22′03″N 26°43′30″E
- Marmaras
- Mavra Levithas
- Megalo Aspronisi Leipson
- Megalo Glaronisi
- Megalo Sofrano
- Mesonisi Seirinas
- Mikro Glaronisi, 37°05′23″N 26°53′09″E
- Mikro Sofrano, 36°02′50″N 26°24′34″E
- Nerónisi, 37°28′37″N 26°59′48″E
- Nimos, 37°22′03″N 26°43′30″E
- Nisídes Adelfoí, 36°25′12″N 26°36′32″E
- **Nisyros**, 36°35′N 27°10′E
- Paheia Nisyrou
- **Patmos**, 37°19.5′N 26°32.5′E
- Pergoussa
- Piganoussa
- Pitta
- Plati Kasou
- Plati Pserimou
- Plati Symis
- Pontikoussa
- Prasonissi Rodhou
- Prasouda
- Pserimos, 36°56′0″N 27°8′0″E
- Ro, 36°09′19″N 29°29′50″E
- **Rhodes** (1,401 km^{2} (541 sq mi)), 36°10′N 27°56′E
- Safonidi
- Saria, 35°52′N 27°13′E
- Seirina
- Sesklio
- Stroggyli
- Strongyli Megistis (Easternmost point of Greece), 36°7′N 29°38′E
- Strongyli Kritinias
- Strongyli Kasou
- **Symi**, 36°35′N 27°50′E
- Syrna, 36°20.33′N 26°40.38′E
- Telendos, 37°00′N 26°55′E
- **Tilos**, 36°26′N 27°22′E
- Tragonisi
- Zaforas, 36°04′24″N 26°24′02″E

=== Euboea and surrounding islands ===
- Atalanti (uninhabited), 38°40′30″N 23°05′46″E
- Euboea, 38°30′N 24°00′E
- Hersonisi
- Kavalliani (uninhabited), 38°40′30″N 23°05′46″E
- Lichades, 38°49′14″N 22°49′04″E
- Lithari
- Mandilou
- Monoliá, 38°49′26″N 22°49′02″E
- Megalos Petalios
- Petalioi (10 small uninhabited islands/islets), 38°00′42″N 24°15′49″E
- Stouronisi, 38°10′15″N 24°09′39″E

=== North Aegean islands ===
- Agios Efstratios, 39°31′N 25°00′E
- Chios, 38°22′39″N 26°03′54″E
- Icaria, 37°35′N 26°10′E
- Lesbos, 39°12′36″N 26°16′48″E
- Lemnos, 39°55′N 25°15′E
- Oinousses, 38°31′N 26°13′E
- Pasas, 38°30′30″N 26°17′10″E
- Psara, 38°33′N 25°34′E
  - Antipsara, 38°32′31″N 25°30′43″E
- Samos, 37°45′N 26°50′E
  - Samiopoula, 37°37′41″N 26°47′38″E
- Fournoi Korseon (37°34′N 26°30′E)
  - Agios Minas (37°35′53″N 26°33′14″E)
  - Thymaina (37°35′N 26°26′E)

There are also two North Aegean islands in the Thracian Sea:

- Samothrace, 40°29′N 25°31′E
- Thassos, 40°41′N 24°39′E

=== Sporades islands ===
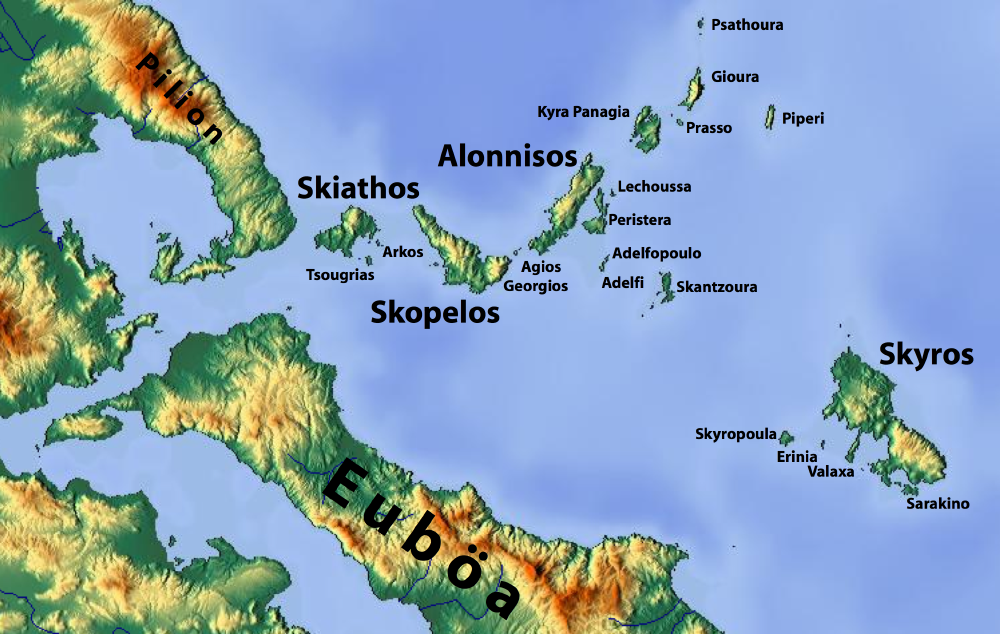
The Northern Sporades

The 30 islands in the Sporades are listed below, with the four major islands in bold. The largest Sporades island is Skyros.

- Adelfoi Islets, 39°07′N 23°59′E
- Agios Georgios Skopelou
- **Alonissos** (64 km^{2} (25 sq mi)), 39°9′N 23°50′E
- Arkos (Skiathos Municipality), 39°09′02″N 23°31′04″E
- Aspronisi (Skiathos Municipality)
- Dasia
- Erinia (Rineia Skyrou), 38°49′48″N 24°25′59″E
- Gioura, 39°23′N 24°10′E
- Grammeza, 39°20′30″N 24°08′17″E
- Korakas Alonissou
- Kyra Panagia, 39°20′N 24°04′E
- Lekhoussa, 39°13′45″N 23°59′56″E
- Manolas Alonissou
- Maragos (Skiathos Municipality)
- Peristera, 39°11′N 23°58′E
- Piperi, 39°20′53″N 24°19′26″E
- Polemika Alonissou
- Praso Skantzouras
- Psathoura, 39°29′53″N 24°10′52″E
- Repi, 39°08′49″N 23°31′44″E
- Sarakino, 38°45′18″N 24°36′36″E
- Skandili, 39°02′55″N 24°04′54″E
- Skantzoura, 39°05′N 24°07′E
- **Skiathos** (49.9 km^{2} (19.3 sq mi) in Municipality), 39°10′N 23°29′E
- **Skopelos** (96 km^{2} (37 sq mi)), 39°7′N 23°43′E
- Skyropoula (Skyros Municipality), 38°50′N 24°22′E
- **Skyros** (209 km^{2} (81 sq mi)), 38°53′N 24°31′E
- Tsougria (Skiathos Municipality), 39°07′N 23°30′E
- Troulonisi (Skiathos Municipality)
- Tsougriaki (Skiathos Municipality)
- Valaxa, 38°49′N 24°29′E

== Ionian Sea islands ==
The main Ionian Islands

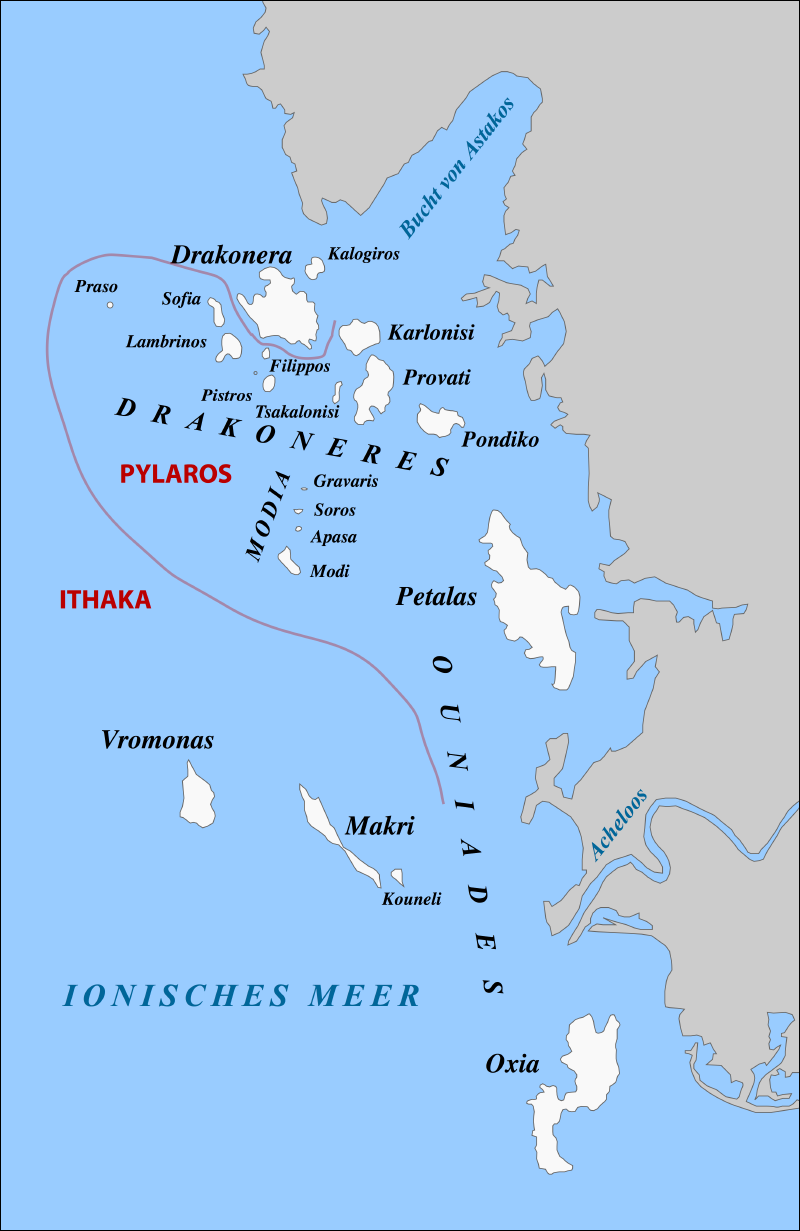
The Echinades islands

Islands in the Ionian Sea are listed below. The seven largest and most popular islands are listed in bold.

- Antikythera, 35°52′N 23°18′E
- Antipaxos, 39°08′57.40″N 20°13′53.98″E
- Arkoudi, 38°33′00″N 20°42′25″E
- Atokos, 38°29′17″N 20°48′43″E
- **Cephalonia**, 38°15′00″N 20°35′00″E
- **Corfu**, 39°35′N 19°52′E
- Diaplo, 39°46′04″N 19°35′33″E
- Echinades
  - Apasa, 38°25′53″N 21°1′29″E
  - Drakonera, 38°28′48″N 21°01′08″E
  - Filippos, 38°28′17″N 21°0′55″E
  - Girovaris or Gkravaris, 38°26′24″N 21°1′36″E
  - Kalogiros, 38°29′28″N 21°01′48″E
  - Karlonisi, 38°28′30″N 21°02′35″E
  - Kouneli or Makropoula, 38°21′6″N 21°3′17″E
  - Lamprinos, 38°28′23″N 21°00′18″E
  - Makri, 38°21′43″N 21°02′02″E
  - Modio or Modi, 38°25′25″N 21°1′20″E
  - Oxeia, 38°18′07″N 21°06′32″E
  - Petalas, 38°24′50″N 21°05′31″E
  - Pistros, 38°27′50″N 21°00′58″E
  - Pontikos, 38°27′18″N 21°03′58″E
  - Praso, 38°28′58″N 20°58′10″E
  - Provati, 38°27′48″N 21°2′53″E
  - Sofía, 38°28′44″N 21°00′04″E
  - Soros, 38°26′5″N 21°1′30″E
  - Tsakalonisi, 38°27′44″N 21°2′11″E
  - Vromonas, 38°22′08″N 20°59′42″E
- Elafonissos, 36°29′15″N 22°57′45″E
- Ereikoussa, 39°53′N 19°35′E
- **Ithaca**, 38°22′N 20°43′E
- Kalamos, 38°37′N 20°55′E
- Kastos, 38°34′N 20°55′E
- Kravia, 39°43′42″N 19°38′05″E
- **Kythira**, 36°15′27″N 22°59′51″E
- Kythros, 38°35′07″N 20°47′58″E
- Lazaretto, 38°22′06″N 20°42′45″E
- **Lefkada**, 38°43′N 20°39′E
- Madouri (Uninhabited), 38°42′25″N 20°43′30″E
- Makropoúla, 38°21′03″N 21°03′16″E
- Mathraki, 39°46′N 19°31′E
- Meganisi, 38°40′N 20°47′E
- Modia Islets, 38°25′59″N 21°01′27″E
- Nisída Ágios Nikólaos, 39°24′20″N 20°13′39″E
- Omfori (Uninhabited, private), 38°30′00″N 20°30′00″E
- Othonoi (westernmost point of Greece), 39°51′N 19°24′E
- **Paxi**, 39°12′N 20°10′E
- Provati, 38°27′47″N 21°02′49″E
- Proti, 37°03′N 21°33′E
- Sapientza, 36°46′18.3″N 21°42′18.1″E
- Schiza (Uninhabited), 36°43′38″N 21°46′08″E
- Skorpios, 38°41′31″N 20°44′35″E
- Skorpidi (Private), 38°41′30″N 20°44′30″E
- Sparti Lefkados, 38°42′57″N 20°44′38″E
- Sphacteria, 36°55′48.49″N 21°39′56.61″E
- Strofades, 37°15′N 21°00′E
- Thilia, 38°39′28″N 20°43′59″E
- Vido, 39°38′30″N 19°55′30″E
- **Zakynthos**, 37°48′N 20°45′E

== Islets close to mainland ==
The following islands are close to the mainland and not part of a sea:

- Alatas Trikeriou, 39°09′38″N 23°12′21″E
- Ammouliani (Chalkidiki), 40°20′N 23°55.2′E
- Antitrikeri (Thessaly)
- Kelyfos, 40°03′42″N 23°43′34″E
- Paleo Trikeri (Thessaly), 39°10′00″N 23°05′00″E
- Trizonia island (Central Greece), 38°22′01″N 22°04′23″E

== Islands not in the sea ==
=== Lake and river islands ===
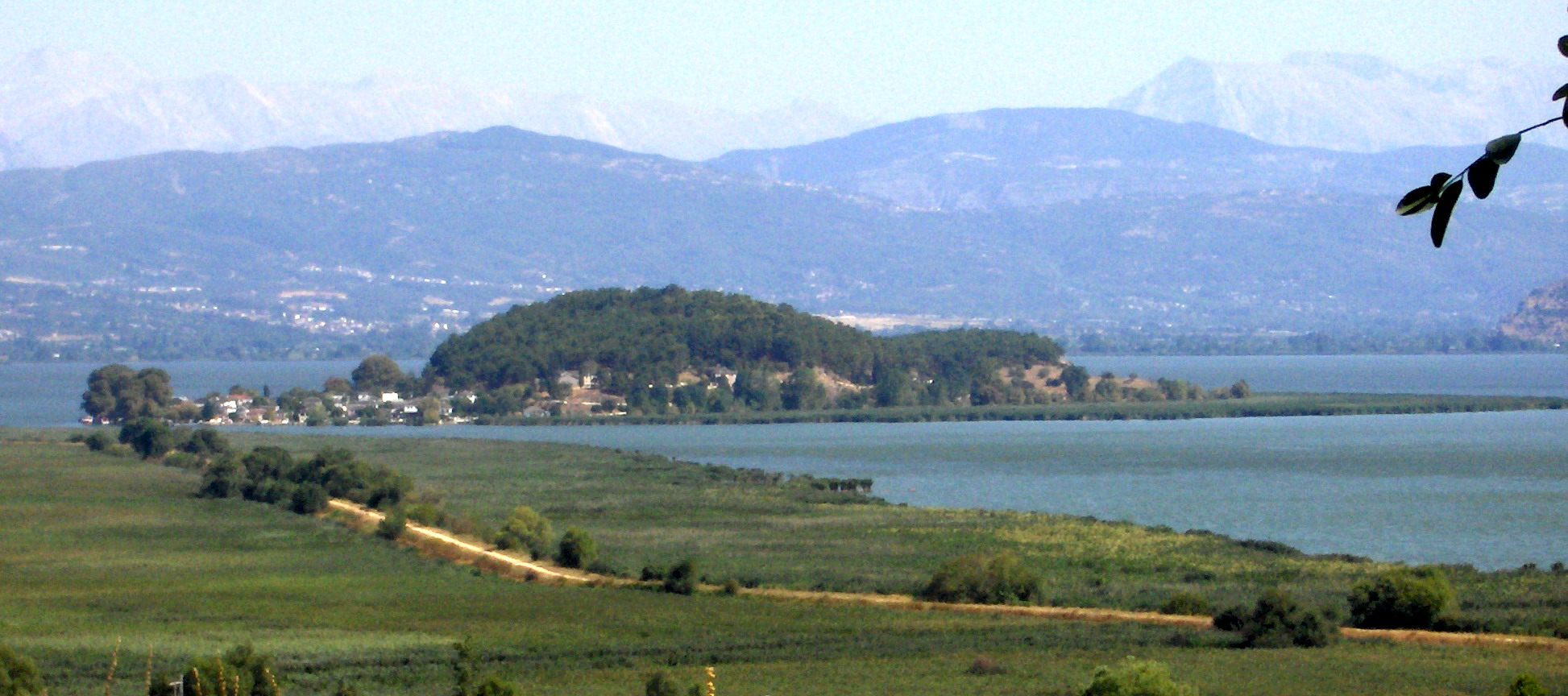
Ioannina Island in Lake Pamvotida

- Agios Achilleios (Small Prespa Lake), 40°46′59″N 21°05′03″E
- Ioannina Island (Lake Pamvotida), 39°40′39″N 20°52′30″E
- Vidronisi (Small Prespa Lake), 40°45′20″N 21°06′14″E
- Anonymous islet (Limnothálassa Pápas lagoon, Western Achaia), 38°11′46″N 21°23′37″E

=== Islands in an island ===
- Marathi Island (Marathi Lake (reservoir) in Mykonos), 37°28′00.8″N 25°21′31.9″E

=== Lagoon islands ===
- Aitoliko Lagoon
  - Aitoliko, 38°26′13″N 21°21′12″E
- Missolonghi Lagoon
  - Dolmas
  - Kleisova, 38°20′57″N 21°26′09″E
  - Komma, 38°19′24″N 21°21′41″E
  - Prokopanistos
  - Schinias
  - Tourlida, 38°19′43″N 21°24′57″E
  - Vasiladi, 38°20′21″N 21°23′04″E

== See also ==
- Geography of Greece
- List of Aegean Islands
- Lists of islands
- List of islands of Turkey
- List of islands in the Mediterranean
