= Prasonisi (disambiguation) =

Prasonisi is a cape on the Greek island of Rhodes.

Prasonisi may also refer to three Greek islets in the Libyan Sea south of Crete:

- Prasonisi (Gavdos)
- Prasonisi (Lefki)
- Prasonisi (Rethymno)
