= Peristeri (disambiguation) =

Peristeri is a western suburb of Athens, Greece.

Peristeri (Greek: Περιστέρι "dove, pigeon") may also refer to the following places in Greece:

- Peristeri (island), an island off Crete
- Peristeri (stream), a small river in Messenia
- Peristeri, Aetolia-Acarnania, a village in the municipal unit Paravola, Aetolia-Acarnania
- Peristeri, Elis, a village near Amaliada in Elis
- Peristeri, Ioannina, a village in the municipal unit Delvinaki, Ioannina regional unit
- Peristeri, Kilkis, a village in the municipal unit Gallikos, Kilkis regional unit
- Peristeri, Laconia, a village in the municipal unit Skala, Laconia
- Peristeri, Phthiotis, a village in the municipal unit Ypati, Phthiotis
