= Praso =

Praso may refer to:

- Praso, Italy, populated place in Trentino in the northern Italian region Trentino-Alto Adige/Südtirol
- Praso (Echinades), islet east of Ithaca, one of the Ionian Islands in Greece
- Praso (Kissamos), islet close to the eastern coast of Crete
- Assin Praso, a town in the Assin North Municipal District of the Central Region in Ghana
