= Fotia =

Fotia (Greek: Φωτιά, 'fire') may refer to:

- Fotia (album), an album by singer Anna Vissi
- Fotia (island), an uninhabited Greek islet in the Libyan Sea
- "Fotiá" (song), a 2021 song by Evangelia and Eleni Foureira
- "Sti fotia", a song by Alexandros Panayi; the Cypriot entry in the 1995 Eurovision Song Contest
