= Aspros Volakas =

Geological feature in Crete, Greece

Native name: Ασπρος Βώλακας
- Interactive map of Aspros Volakas

Geography
- Coordinates: 35°05′48″N 24°37′01″E
- Archipelago: Cretan Islands

Administration
- Greece
- Region: Crete
- Regional unit: Rethymno

Demographics
- Population: 0

Aspros Volakas (Greek: Ασπρος Βώλακας, white rock) is a large white rock, next to Long Beach, on the coast of Crete, near Lambi, in Rethymno regional unit. This rock feature is formally designated as a cape due to the shallow water.

Aspros Volakas is very close to Long Beach. There is another rock that is further away, to the east, called Mavros Volakas.

== See also ==
- List of islands of Greece
- Mavros Volakas
