= Pontikaki =

Greek islet in the Aegean Sea

Native name: Ποντικάκι
- Location within Greece

Geography
- Coordinates: 35.581667°N 23.4725°E
- Archipelago: Cretan Islands

Administration
- Greece
- Region: Crete
- Regional unit: Chania

Demographics
- Population: 0 (2001)

Pontikaki (Greek: Ποντικάκι, "little mouse") is an uninhabited Greek islet off the western coast of Crete that is close to the islet of Pondikonisi. Administratively, it is part of the municipality of Kissamos, in Chania regional unit.

== See also ==
- List of islands of Greece
