= Peristerovrachoi =

Group of islets in Greece

Native name: Περιστερόβραχοι
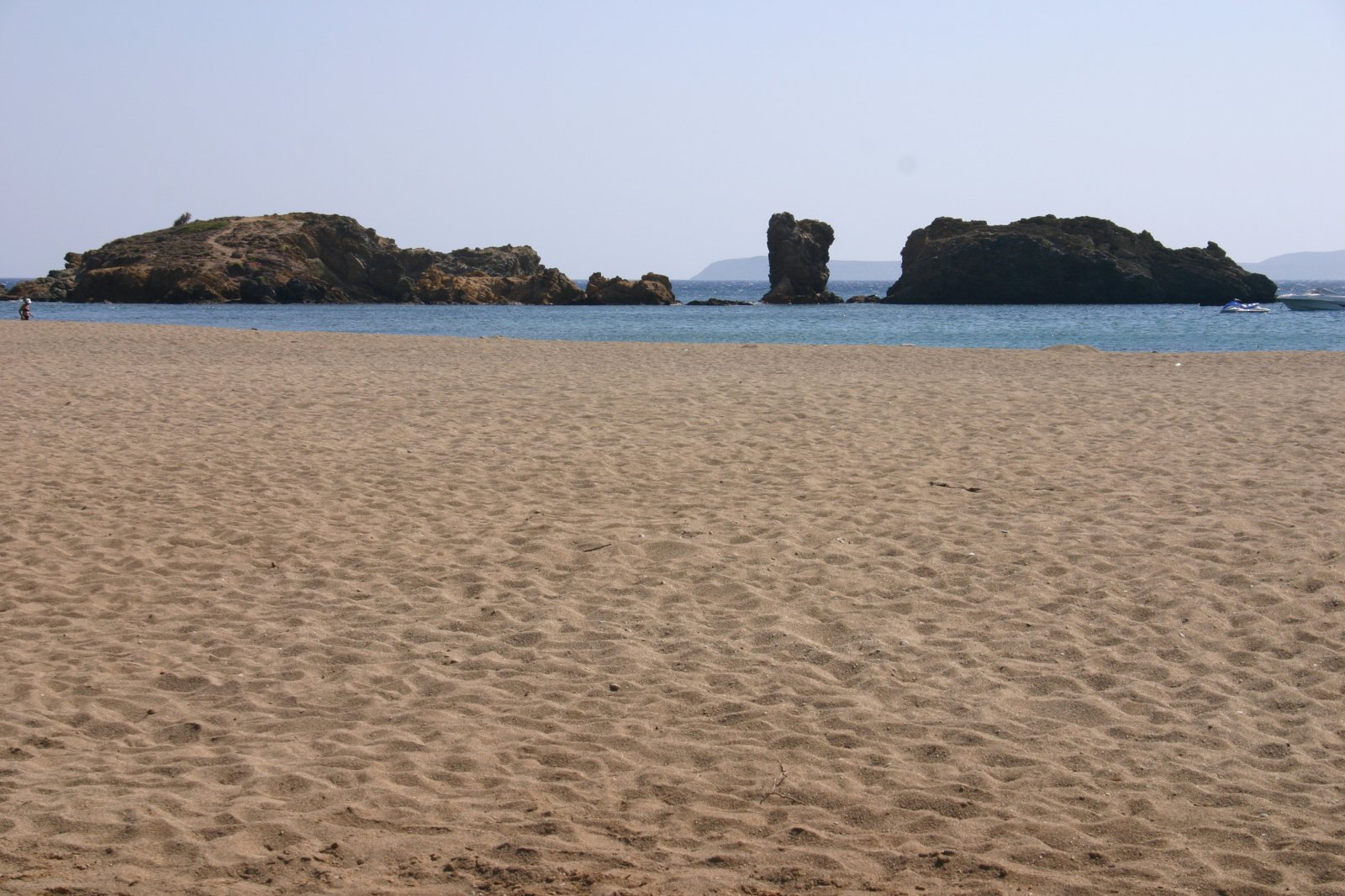
- The islets/rocks of Peristerovrachi.
- Interactive map of Peristerovrachoi

Geography
- Coordinates: 35°15′21″N 26°16′01″E
- Archipelago: Cretan Islands

Administration
- Greece
- Region: Crete
- Regional unit: Lasithi

Demographics
- Population: 0 (2001)

Peristerovrachoi (Greek: Περιστερόβραχοι, lit. 'pigeon rocks'), are uninhabited Greek islets/rocks, in the Aegean Sea, close to the eastern coast of Crete. Administratively they lie within the Itanos municipality of Lasithi.

== See also ==
- List of islands of Greece
