= Daskaleia =

Greek islet in the Aegean Sea

Native name: Δασκαλειά
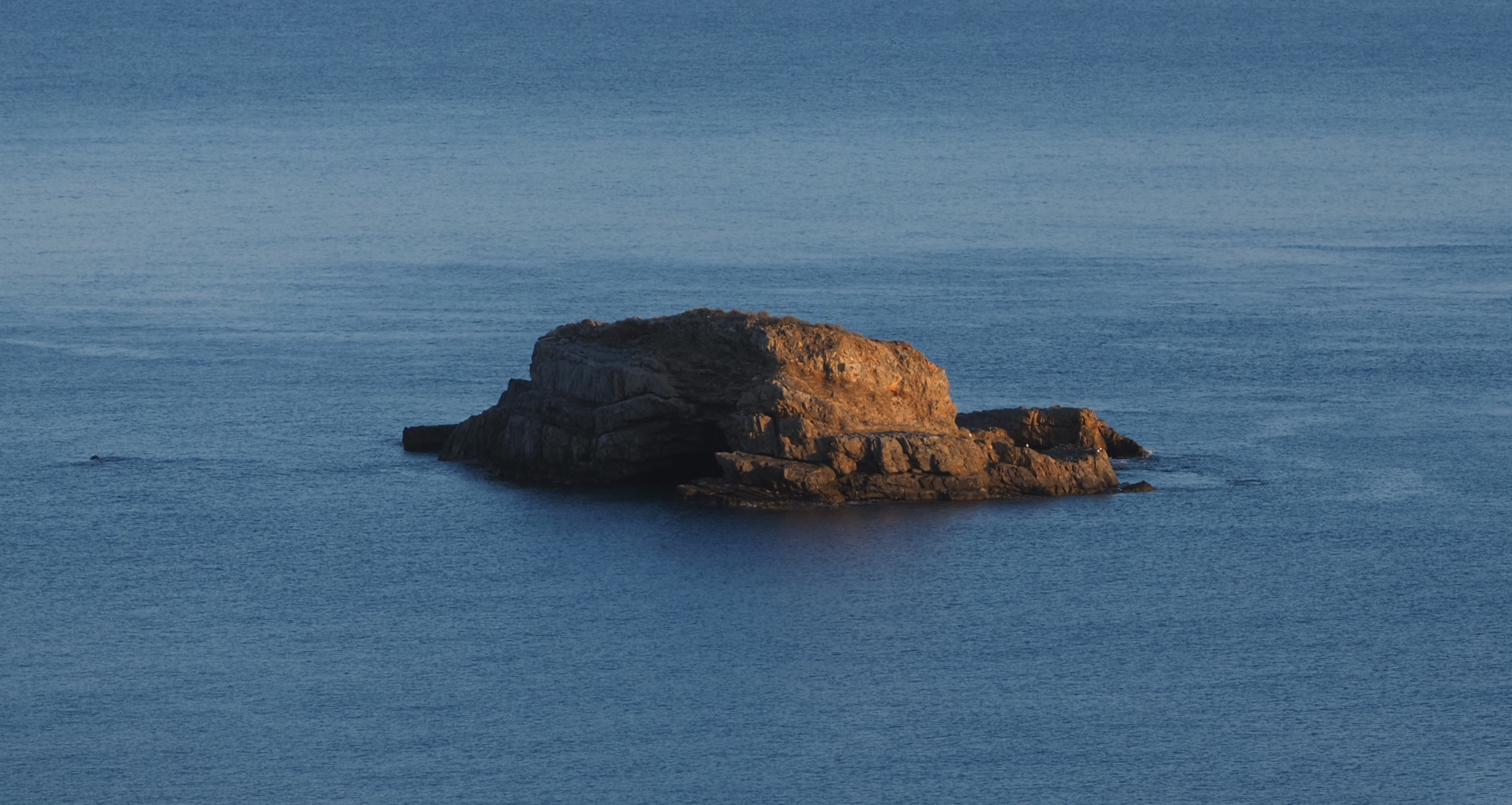
- Interactive map of Daskaleia

Geography
- Coordinates: 35°18′01″N 26°18′37″E
- Archipelago: Cretan Islands

Administration
- Greece
- Region: Crete
- Regional unit: Lasithi

Demographics
- Population: 0 (2001)

Daskaleia (Greek: Δασκαλειά), is an uninhabited Greek islet, in the Aegean Sea, close to the northeastern coast of Crete. The small islet lies close to the island of Kyriamadi. Administratively it lies within the Itanos municipality of Lasithi.

== See also ==
- List of islands of Greece
