= Koursaroi =

Greek islet in the Aegean Sea

Native name: Κουρσάροι
- Location within Greece

Geography
- Coordinates: 35.4817°N 23.5644°E
- Archipelago: Cretan Islands

Administration
- Greece
- Region: Crete
- Regional unit: Chania

Demographics
- Population: 0 (2001)

Koursaroi (Greek: Κουρσάροι, "privateers or privateering vessels"), also known as Nisaki (Greek: Νησάκι, "small island"), is an islet close to the western coast of Crete, and north-east of the islet of Praso, in the Aegean Sea. Administratively, it is located within the municipality of Kissamos, in Chania regional unit.

== See also ==
- List of islands of Greece
