= Schistonisi =

Native name: Σχιστονήσι
- Interactive map of Schistonisi

Geography
- Coordinates: 35°13′18″N 23°40′18″E
- Archipelago: Cretan Islands

Administration
- Greece
- Region: Crete
- Regional unit: Chania

Demographics
- Population: 0 (2001)

Schistonisi (Greek: Σχιστονήσι, "cleaved island"), also called Schisto (Greek: Σχιστό), and Trachili (Greek: Τραχήλι), is a small islet off the southern coast of Crete in the Libyan Sea. The islet is located south-west of the town of Palaiochora. Administratively, it is located within the municipality of Pelekanos, in Chania regional unit.

== See also ==
- List of islands of Greece
