= Lazaretta =

Islet near Chania, Crete, Greece

Native name: Λαζαρέττα
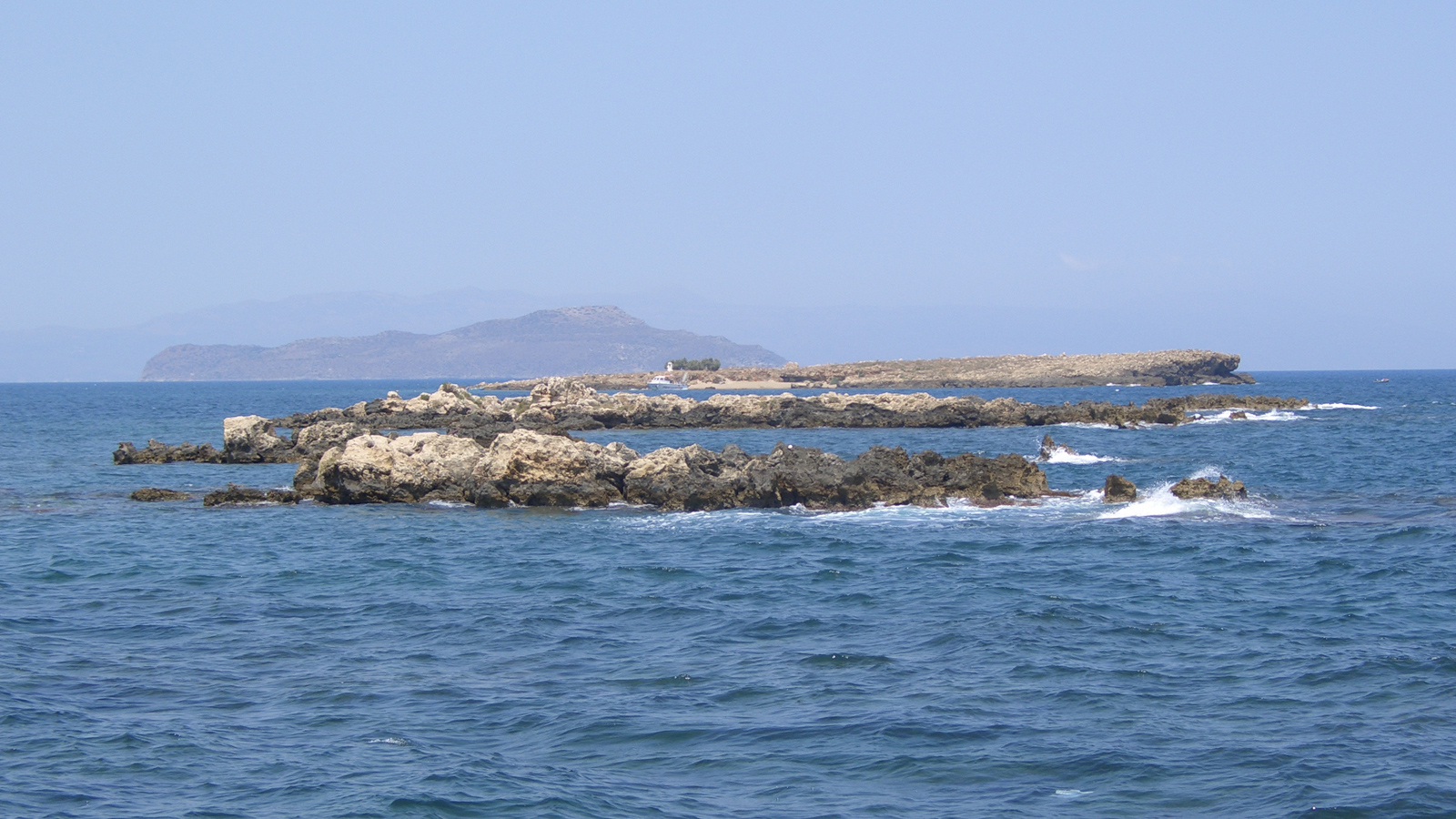
- The island of Lazaretta.
- Interactive map of Lazaretta

Geography
- Coordinates: 35°31′09″N 23°59′58″E
- Archipelago: Cretan Islands

Administration
- Greece
- Region: Crete
- Regional unit: Chania

Demographics
- Population: 0 (2001)

Lazaretta (Greek: Λαζαρέττα), also called Lazaretto (and alternatively spelled Lazareto), is an uninhabited island close to the northern coast of Crete in the Aegean Sea. It is located near the city of Chania and administratively, it is within the municipality of Chania, in Chania regional unit.

Lazaretta is a popular destination for swimmers on sightseeing boats from Chania harbour.

== See also ==
- List of islands of Greece
