= Petalida =

Island in Greece

Native name: Πεταλίδα
- Interactive map of Petalida

Geography
- Coordinates: 35°36′02″N 23°35′22″E
- Archipelago: Cretan Islands

Administration
- Greece
- Region: Crete
- Regional unit: Chania

Demographics
- Population: 0 (2001)

Petalida (Greek: Πεταλίδα, "limpet"), also known as Xera (pronounced "ksera"), is an islet close to the northern coast of Crete in the Aegean Sea. It is located between the island of Imeri Gramvousa and the mainland. Administratively, it is located within the municipality of Kissamos, in Chania regional unit.

== See also ==
- List of islands of Greece
