= Prasonisi (Lefki) =

Native name: Πρασονήσι
- Location within Greece

Geography
- Coordinates: 34.9942°N 26.1166°E
- Archipelago: Cretan Islands

Administration
- Greece
- Region: Crete
- Regional unit: Lasithi

Demographics
- Population: 0 (2001)

Prasonisi (Greek: Πρασονήσι, "leek island"), is an uninhabited Greek islet, in the Libyan Sea, close to the southern coast of eastern Crete. Administratively it lies within the Lefki municipality of Lasithi.

== See also ==
- List of islands of Greece
