= Ftena Trachylia =

Island off Sitia, Greece

Ftena Trachilia
Native name: Φτενά Τραχύλια
- Interactive map of Ftena Trachilia

Geography
- Coordinates: 35°18′56″N 26°17′14″E
- Archipelago: Cretan Islands

Administration
- Greece
- Region: Crete
- Regional unit: Lasithi

Demographics
- Population: 0 (2001)

Ftena Trachylia (Greek: Φτενά Τραχύλια, "thin and rough or uneven"), also known as Pinnacle Rocks (Greek: Πίνακλ), are a group of uninhabited Greek islets/rocks, in the Aegean Sea, close to the eastern coast of Crete. Administratively they lie within the Itanos municipality of Lasithi.

The "Trachylia" part of the name was probably given due to the shape of the islet rocks (and many of the islets surrounding Crete are named from their shape). For example, see Trachea (cup-shaped Byzantine coins) and Trachylinae (cup-shaped jellyfish).

== See also ==
- List of islands of Greece

== Sources ==
- ELSTAT (2009). "Population & housing census 2001 (incl. area and average elevation)" (PDF) (in Greek). Archived (PDF) from the original on 2015-09-21.
