= Treis Volakous =

Group of islets in Greece

Native name: Τρεις Βολάκους
- Interactive map of Treis Volakous

Geography
- Coordinates: 35°12′00″N 24°07′58″E
- Archipelago: Cretan Islands

Administration
- Greece
- Region: Crete
- Regional unit: Chania

Demographics
- Population: 0 (2001)

Treis Volakous (Greek: Τρεις Βολάκους, "three rocks") are rocks close to the southern coast of Crete in the Libyan Sea. They fall within the administration of the municipality of Sfakia, in Chania regional unit.

== See also ==
- List of islands of Greece
