= Prosfora =

Island off Crete, Greece

Native name: Προσφορά
- Interactive map of Prosfora

Geography
- Coordinates: 35°13′40″N 26°06′18″E
- Archipelago: Cretan Islands

Administration
- Greece
- Region: Crete
- Regional unit: Lasithi

Demographics
- Population: 0 (2001)

Prosfora (Greek: Προσφορά, "offering"), is an uninhabited Greek islet, close to the coast of Lasithi, eastern Crete. Administratively it lies within the Sitia municipality of Lasithi.

== See also ==
- List of islands of Greece
