= Glaronisi =

Islet in Greece near Crete

Native name: Γλαρονήσι
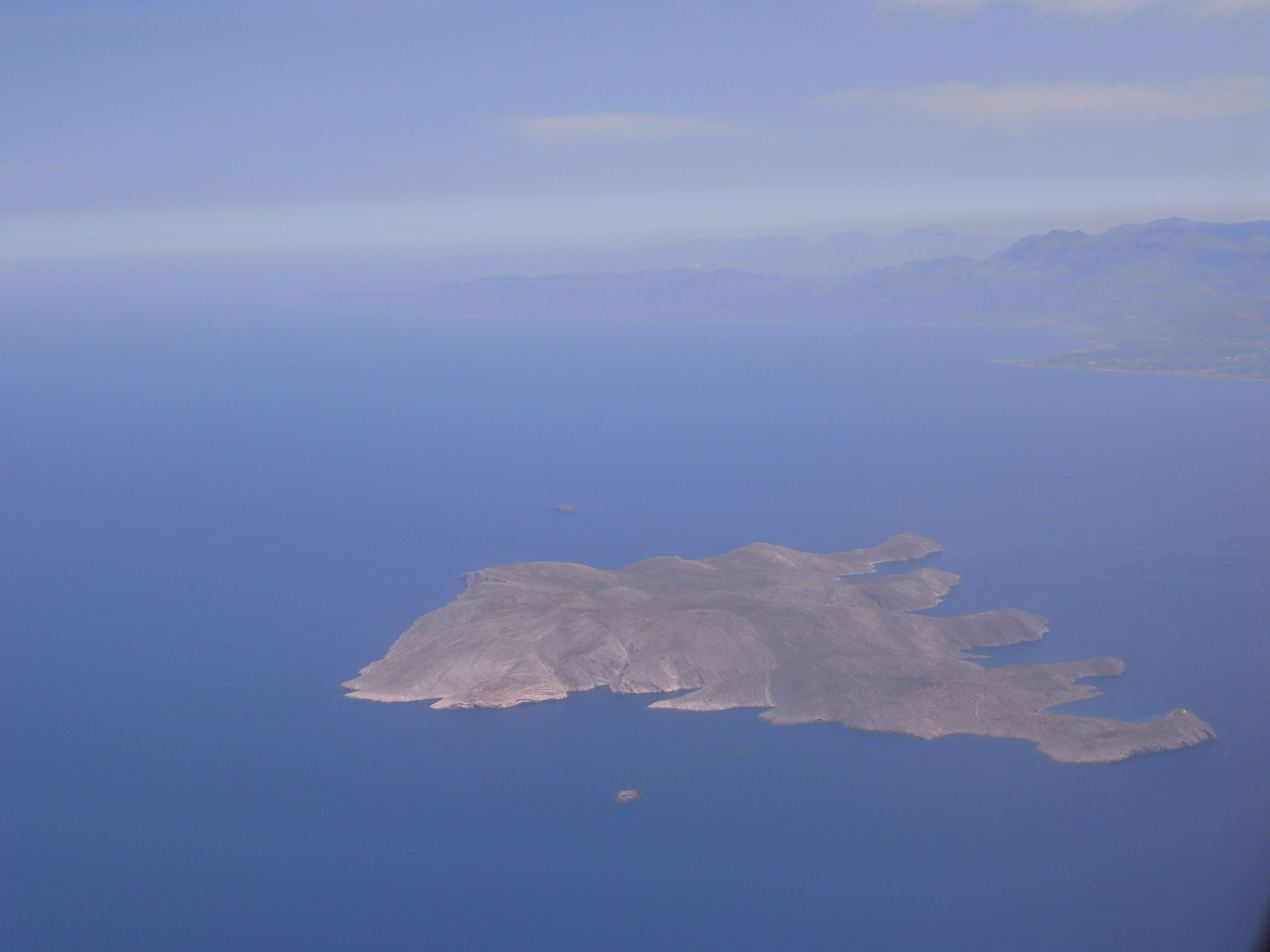
- The islet of Glaronisi and the larger island of Dia

- Location within Greece

Geography
- Coordinates: 35°27′48″N 25°11′27″E
- Archipelago: Cretan Islands

Administration
- Greece
- Region: Crete
- Regional unit: Heraklion

Glaronisi (Greek: Γλαρονήσι, "seagull island", also known as Petalidi (Greek: Πεταλίδι, "limpet"), is an islet off the northwest coast of the island of Dia, north of the Greek island of Crete. Glaronisi is administered from Gouves in Heraklion regional unit.

== See also ==
- List of islands of Greece
