= Mavros Volakas =

Uninhabited island of Crete

Native name: Μαύρος Βώλακας
- Interactive map of Mavros Volakas

Geography
- Coordinates: 35°05′48″N 24°37′01″E
- Archipelago: Cretan Islands

Administration
- Greece
- Region: Crete
- Regional unit: Rethymno

Demographics
- Population: 0

Mavros Volakas (Greek: Μαύρος Βώλακας) is a large rock, next to Long Beach, on the coast of Crete, near Lambi, in Rethymno regional unit.

There is another large rock that is even closer to the beach, called Aspros Volakas.

== See also ==
- List of islands of Greece
