= Arnaouti =

Greek islet in the Aegean Sea

Native name: Αρναούτη
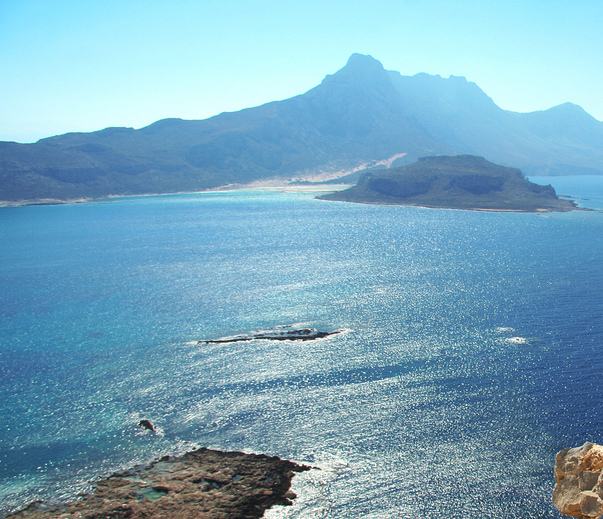
- The islet of Arnaouti.
- Interactive map of Arnaouti

Geography
- Coordinates: 35°36′12″N 23°34′42″E
- Archipelago: Cretan Islands

Administration
- Greece
- Region: Crete
- Regional unit: Chania

Demographics
- Population: 0 (2001)

Arnaouti (Greek: Αρναούτη) is an islet on the northern coast of Crete in the Aegean Sea. It is just south of the island of Imeri Gramvousa and is located between Imeri Gramvousa and Valenti rock. Administratively, it is located within the municipality of Kissamos, in Chania regional unit.

== See also ==
- List of islands of Greece
