= Petalouda =

Island off Kissamos, Greece

Native name: Πεταλούδα
- Interactive map of Petalouda

Geography
- Coordinates: 35°36′12″N 23°34′42″E
- Archipelago: Cretan Islands

Administration
- Greece
- Region: Crete
- Regional unit: Chania

Demographics
- Population: 0 (2001)

Petalouda (Greek: Πεταλούδα, "butterfly") is an uninhabited islet off the coast of western Crete in the Aegean Sea. Administratively, it is part of the municipality Kissamos, in Chania regional unit.

== See also ==
- List of islands of Greece
