= Ammoudi tous Volakous =

Greek islet in the Libyan Sea

Native name: Αμμούδι τους Βολάκους
- Interactive map of Ammoudi tous Volakous

Geography
- Coordinates: 35°11′32″N 24°08′36″E
- Archipelago: Cretan Islands

Administration
- Greece
- Region: Crete
- Regional unit: Chania

Demographics
- Population: 0 (2001)

Ammoudi tous Volakous (Greek: Αμμούδι τους Βολάκους, "sandy beach of the rocks") is an uninhabited islet to the south of the western coast of Crete in the Libyan Sea. Just south of Sfakia it is within Sfakia's administration, in Chania regional unit.

== See also ==
- List of islands of Greece
