= Pondikonisi =

Greek islet in the Aegean Sea

Pontikonisi
Native name: Ποντικονήσι
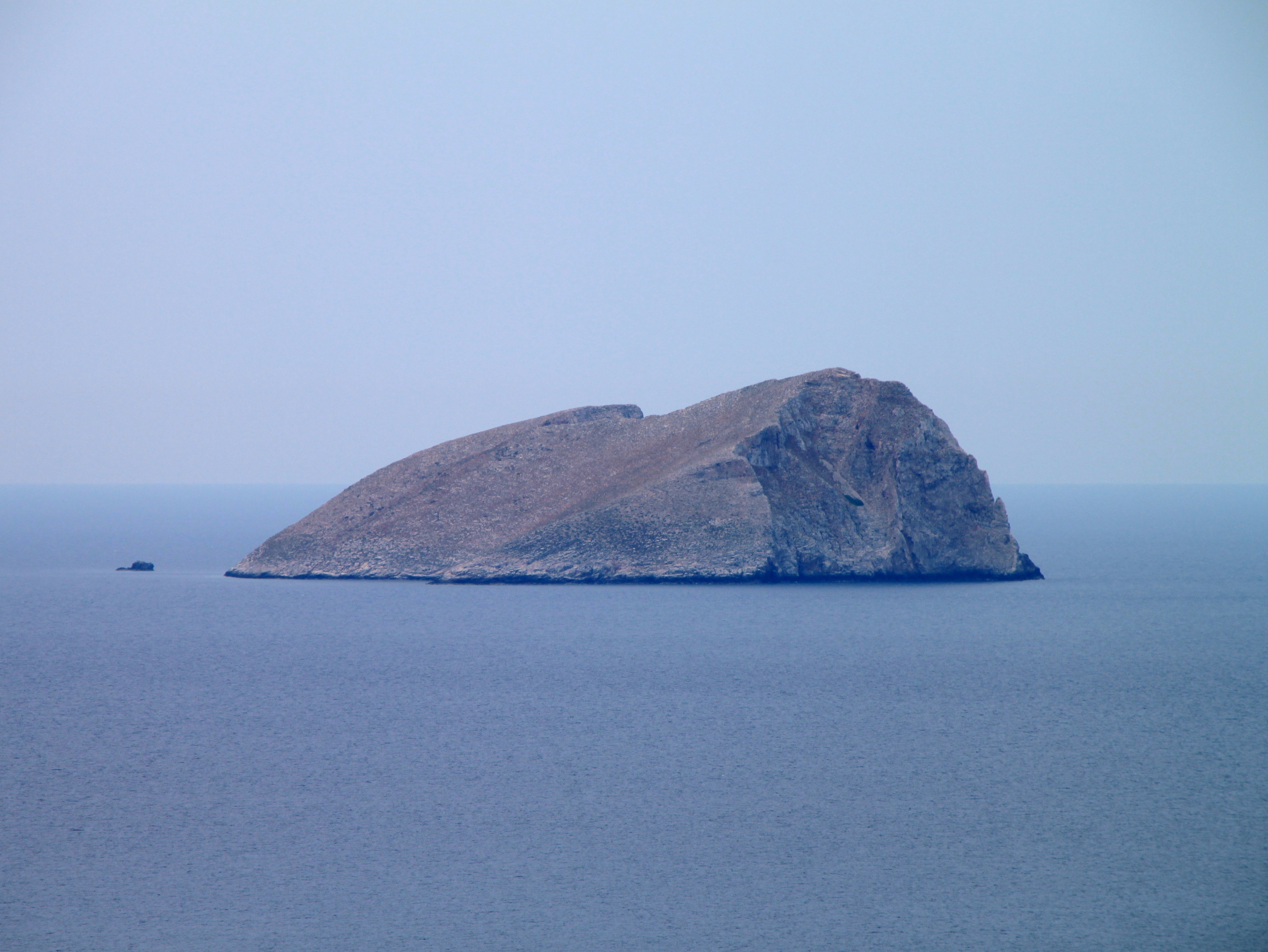
- The islet of Pontikonisi

- Location within Greece

Geography
- Coordinates: 35.586°N 23.477°E
- Archipelago: Cretan Islands
- Area: 2.5 km^{2} (0.97 sq mi)

Administration
- Greece
- Region: Crete
- Regional unit: Chania

Demographics
- Population: 0 (2001)

Pontikonisi (Greek: Ποντικονήσι, "mouse island") is an uninhabited islet off the coast of western Crete. Administratively, it is part of the municipality Kissamos, in Chania regional unit. There is a small islet, around 100 meters from Pontikonisi, called Pontikaki ("little mouse").

== See also ==
- List of islands of Greece
