= Katergo =

Greek islet in the Aegean Sea

Native name: Κάτεργο
- Interactive map of Katergo

Geography
- Coordinates: 35°09′25″N 25°50′51″E
- Archipelago: Cretan Islands

Administration
- Greece
- Region: Crete
- Regional unit: Lasithi

Demographics
- Population: 0 (2001)

Katergo (Greek: Κάτεργο, "galley, hulk"), is an uninhabited Greek islet, in the Aegean Sea, close to the eastern coast of Crete. Administratively it lies within the Itanos municipality of Lasithi.

== See also ==
- List of islands of Greece
