= Psyllos =

Greek islet

Native name: Ψύλλος
- Interactive map of Psyllos

Geography
- Coordinates: 35°06′55″N 25°48′07″E
- Archipelago: Cretan Islands

Administration
- Greece
- Region: Crete
- Regional unit: Lasithi

Demographics
- Population: 0 (2001)

Psyllos (Greek: Ψύλλος, "flea"), is an uninhabited Greek islet, in the Aegean Sea, close to the northern coast of eastern Crete. Administratively it lies within the Ierapetra municipality of Lasithi.

== See also ==
- List of islands of Greece
