= Diapori =

Greek islet in the Cretan Sea

Native name: Διαπόρι
- Location within Greece

Geography
- Coordinates: 35.4217°N 24.8756°E
- Archipelago: Cretan Islands

Administration
- Greece
- Region: Crete
- Regional unit: Rethymno

Demographics
- Population: 0

Diapori (Greek: Διαπόρι) is an island that almost touches the coast of Crete, near Geropotamos, in Rethymno regional unit. The islet is not visible on many maps but can be seen on satellite images.

== See also ==
- List of islands of Greece
