= Valenti rock =

Island off Kissamos, Greece

Valenti
Native name: Βαλέντι
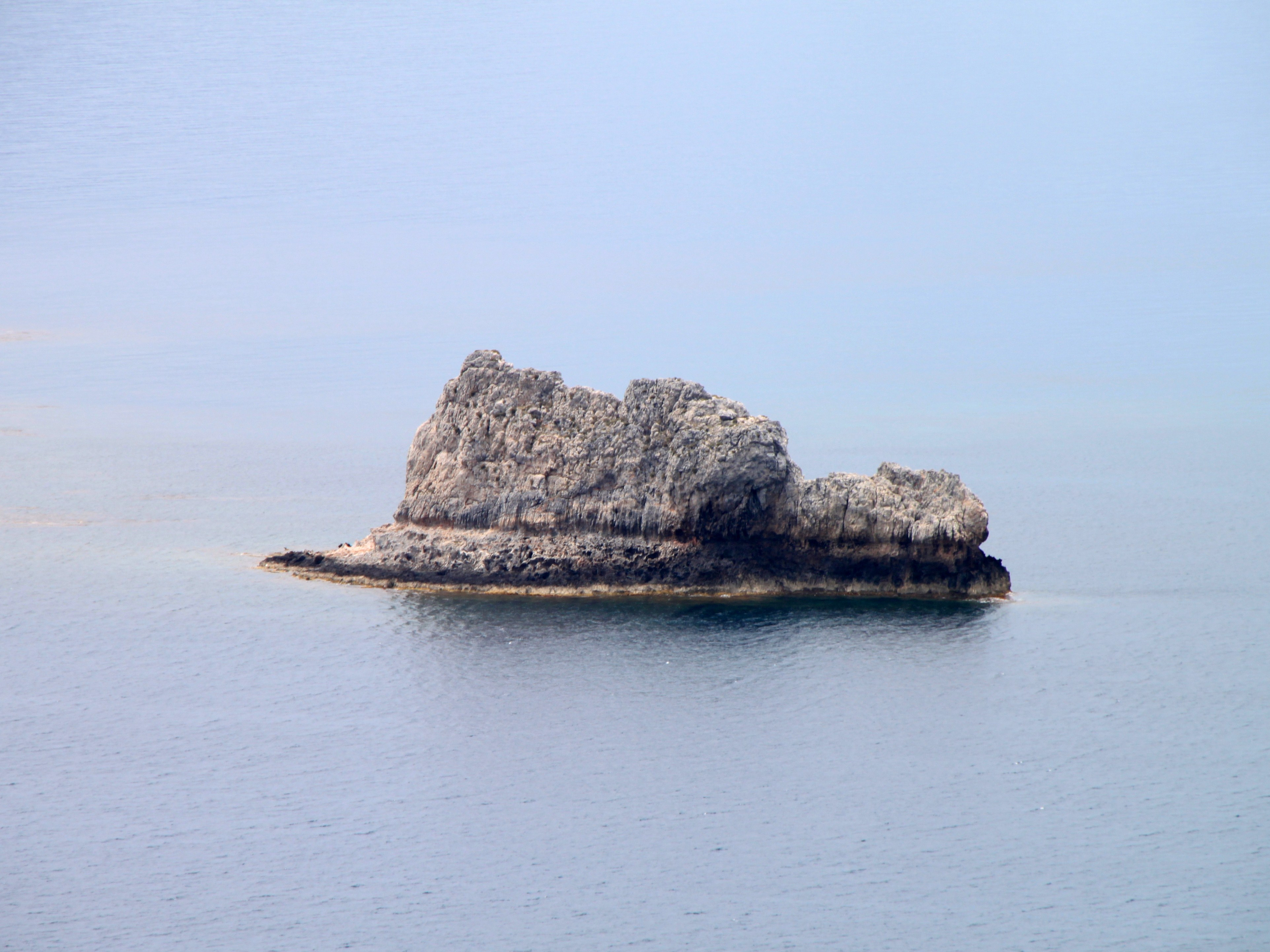
- Valenti rock
- Interactive map of Valenti

Geography
- Coordinates: 35°35′41″N 23°34′30″E
- Archipelago: Cretan Islands

Administration
- Greece
- Region: Crete
- Regional unit: Chania

Demographics
- Population: 0 (2001)

Valenti (Greek: Βαλέντι) is a rock close to the northwestern coast of Crete in the Aegean Sea. It is just south of the island of Imeri Gramvousa and the islet of Arnaouti. Administratively, it is located within the municipality of Kissamos, in Chania regional unit.

Valenti is mentioned in poems and mantinades and usually with Gramvousa. In March 2008, a fatal nautical accident, resulting in the death of a 42-year-old man, occurred close to the rock and it is noted in a bulletin of the Ministry of Maritime Affairs, Islands and Fisheries.

== See also ==
- List of islands of Greece
