= Vous Island =

Greek island in the Aegean Sea

Vous
Native name: Βους
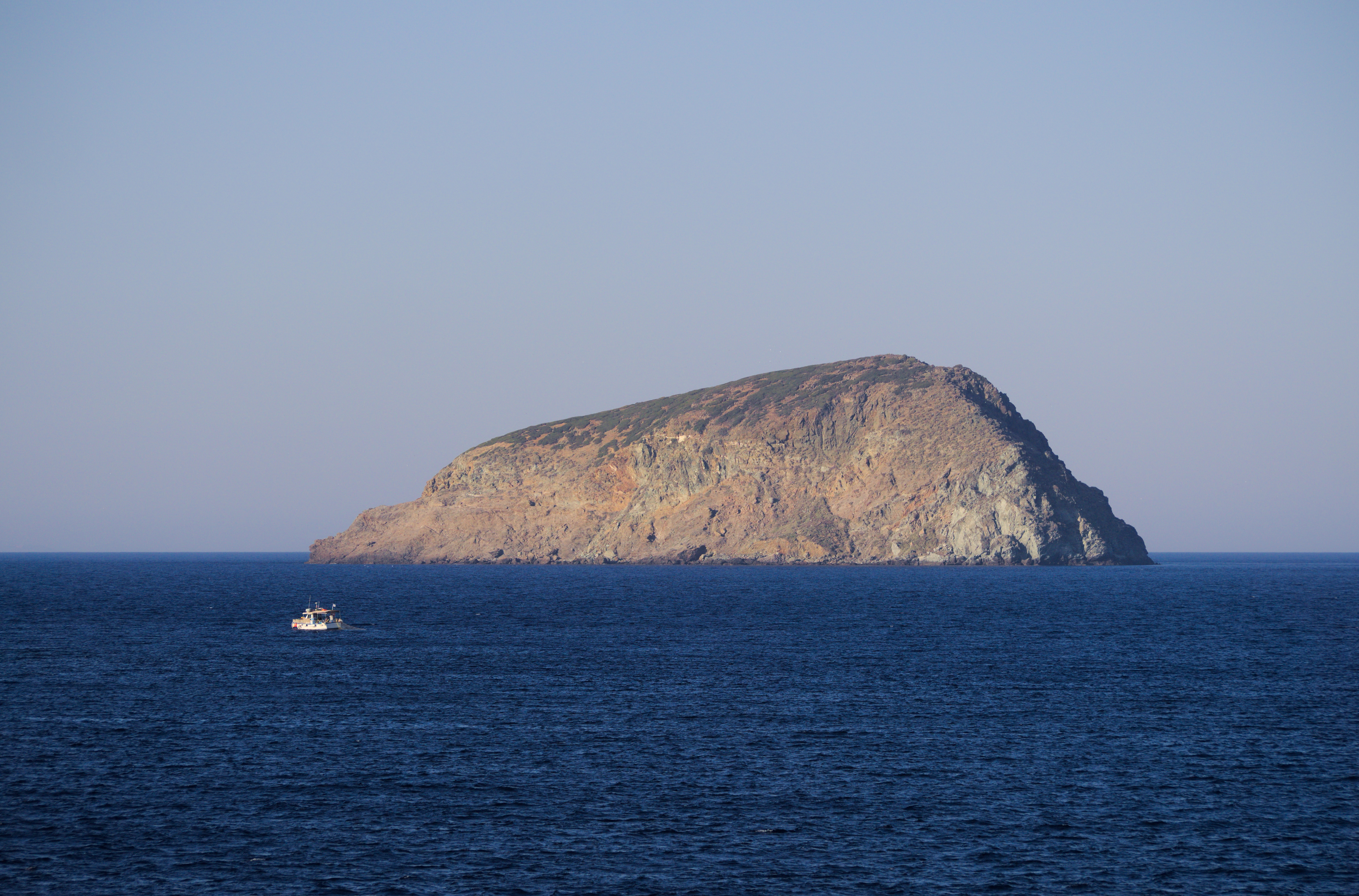
- View from southwest

- Location within Greece

Geography
- Coordinates: 37.142°N 24.562°E
- Archipelago: Cyclades

Administration
- Greece
- Region: South Aegean
- Regional unit: Milos

Demographics
- Population: 0 (2001)

Additional information
- Postal code: 840 02
- Area code: 22810
- Vehicle registration: EM

Vous (Greek: Βους; Translation: Ox) is a small, uninhabited island 2 kilometres off the east coast of Serifos in the Cyclades, Greece. Its name is evocative of the profile of an ox, which it resembles as seen from Sefiros. The island has a perimeter of approximately 2 kilometres and its greatest length is approximately 570 metres. The island is a popular fishing spot. Administratively, it is part of the municipality of Serifos.
