= Psarocharako =

Island off Viannos, Greece

Native name: Ψαροχάρακο
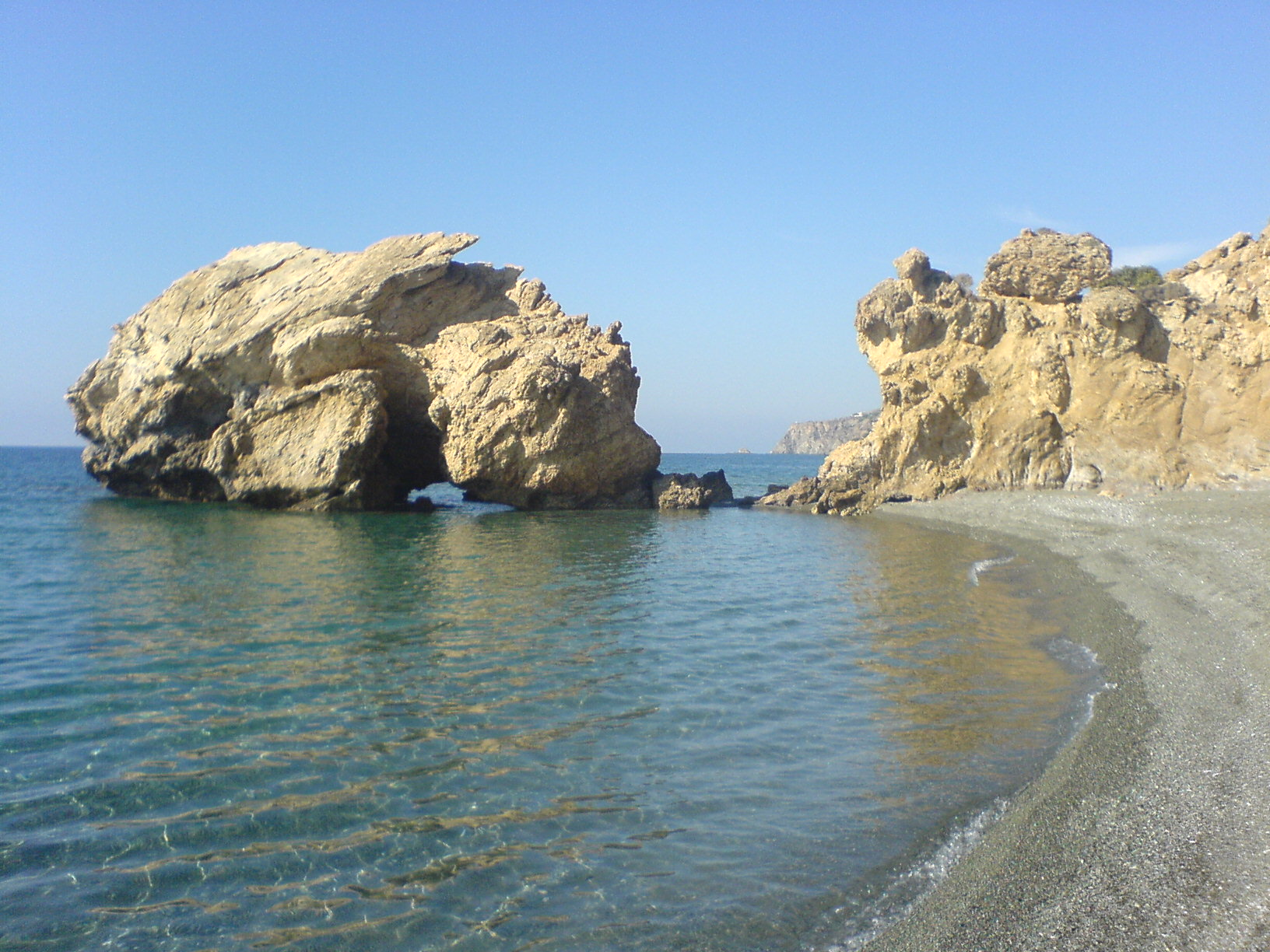
- Psarocharako
- Interactive map of Psarocharako

Geography
- Coordinates: 34°58′52″N 25°30′08″E
- Archipelago: Cretan Islands

Administration
- Greece
- Region: Crete
- Regional unit: Heraklion

Psarocharako (Greek: Ψαροχάρακο, "fish rock") is a large rock off the southern coast of the Greek island of Crete in the Libyan Sea. The islet is administered from Viannos in Heraklion regional unit near Tertsa.
