= Thetis (island) =

Greek islet in the Libyan Sea

Native name: Θέτις
- Interactive map of Thetis

Geography
- Coordinates: 34°57′13″N 25°09′26″E
- Archipelago: Cretan Islands

Administration
- Greece
- Region: Crete
- Regional unit: Heraklion

Thetis or Vala (Greek: Θέτις or Greek: Βάλα) is a small rocky islet located off the southern coast of Crete, Greece in the Libyan Sea. It lies to the east of the settlement of Kali Limenes in Heraklion regional unit and to the west of Cape Alikapouda. The islet is administered from Asterousia in Heraklion regional unit.
