= Agriomandra =

Agriomandra (Greek: Αγριόμαντρα, "wild pen or wild enclosure") is a peninsula on the northern coast of Crete, northeast of Pachia Ammos and west of Kavousi. Administratively it lies within the Ierapetra municipality of Lasithi. Prior to World War II, it was used as a commercial port.
