= Prasonisi (Gavdos) =

Greek islet in the Libyan Sea

Native name: Πρασονήσι
- Interactive map of Prasonisi

Geography
- Coordinates: 34°52′22″N 24°04′30″E
- Archipelago: Cretan Islands

Administration
- Greece
- Region: Crete
- Regional unit: Chania

Demographics
- Population: 0 (2001)

Prasonisi (Greek: Πρασονήσι, "leek island"), is a small islet off the southern coast of Crete, close to the northern coast of the island of Gavdos and between Gavdos and the islet of Gavdopoula, in the Libyan Sea. Administratively, it is located within the municipality of Gavdos, in Chania regional unit.

== See also ==
- List of islands of Greece
