= Fotia (island) =

Greek island in the Libyan Sea

Native name: Φωτιά
- Interactive map of Fotia

Geography
- Coordinates: 35°00′51″N 25°52′26″E
- Archipelago: Cretan Islands

Administration
- Greece
- Region: Crete
- Regional unit: Lasithi

Demographics
- Population: 0 (2001)

Fotia (Greek: Φωτιά, "fire"), is an uninhabited Greek islet, in the Libyan Sea, close to the eastern coast of Crete. Administratively it lies within the Ierapetra municipality of Lasithi.

== See also ==
- List of islands of Greece
