= Praso (Kissamos) =

Island off Kissamos, Greece

Native name: Πράσο
- Interactive map of Praso

Geography
- Coordinates: 35°28′27″N 23°33′22″E
- Archipelago: Cretan Islands

Administration
- Greece
- Region: Crete
- Regional unit: Chania

Demographics
- Population: 0 (2001)

Praso (Greek: Πράσο, "leek"), also known as Prasonisi (Greek: Πρασονήσι, "leek island"), is an islet close to the eastern coast of Crete, and south-west of the islet of Koursaroi, in the Aegean Sea. Administratively, it is located within the municipality of Kissamos, in Chania regional unit.

== See also ==
- List of islands of Greece
