= Skorpidi Lefkada =

Greek island in the Ionian Sea

Coordinates: 38°41′30″N 20°44′30″E

Skorpidi
Native name: Σκορπίδι Nickname: Skorpidi
- Interactive map of Skorpidi

Geography
- Archipelago: Ionian Sea

Administration
- Greece

Demographics
- Population: 0 (2011)

Scorpidi Lefkada (Greek: Σκορπίδι Λευκάδας) is a small island in the Ionian Sea just north of Scorpio. It belongs to the Televoes Islands cluster and the Prigiponisia (Lefkada) cluster. The island is now privately owned and 50% of it is owned by New Democracy member of the Parliament Spilios Livanos.
