= Nisída Ágios Nikólaos =

Island near Syvota, Thesprotia, Greece

Native name: Νησίδα Άγιος Νικόλαος
- Location within Greece

Geography
- Coordinates: 39.40564°N 20.22747°E
- Area: 0.60 km^{2} (0.23 sq mi)
- Highest elevation: 29 m (95 ft)

Administration
- Greece
- Region: Epirus
- Regional Unit: Thesprotia

Demographics
- Population: 0 (2011)

Additional information
- Time zone: EET (UTC+2)
  - Summer (DST): EEST (UTC+3)

Nisída Ágios Nikólaos (Greek: Νησίδα Άγιος Νικόλαος) is an island in Epirus, Greece. The island does not have a permanent population, but many travel by boat to visit the islands two beaches, Pana beach and Diapori beach or the Chapel of St. Nicholas in the middle of the island. Due to the unique snail like shape of Diapori beach, the water temperature varies greatly in a vary short distance.
