= Peristeri (island) =

Greek islet in the Aegean Sea

Native name: Περιστέρι
- Interactive map of Peristeri

Geography
- Coordinates: 35°24′53″N 24°49′35″E
- Archipelago: Cretan Islands

Administration
- Greece
- Region: Crete
- Regional unit: Rethymno

Demographics
- Population: 0

Peristeri (Greek: Περιστέρι, "pigeon") is an islet close to the northern coast of Crete, in the Perama district of the Geropotamos municipality, in Rethymno regional unit.

== See also ==
- List of islands of Greece
