= Omfori =

Uninhibited island administered by Greece

Omfori Island
- Interactive map of Omfori Island

Geography
- Location: Ionian Sea, Greece
- Coordinates: 38°30′00″N 20°30′00″E
- Adjacent to: Ionian Sea
- Area: 4.500 km^{2} (1.737 sq mi)
- Highest elevation: 260.4 m (854.3 ft)

Administration
- Greece
- Region: Ionian Islands
- Regional Unit: Ithaca

Demographics
- Population: 0 (2013)

Omfori Island is a private, uninhabited, 1,112.00-acre (450.01-hectare) island in the Ionian Sea. As of 2020 the island has one building, a church, and is unpopulated. In 2015, the island was on sale for $61.9 million, and in 2017, it was the most expensive island in Greece and the 9th most expensive in the world, for $60 million. As of 2021, the island is still on sale for $55 to $62 million.
