= Prasonisi (Rethymno) =

Greek islet in the Libyan Sea

Native name: Πρασονήσι
- Location within Greece

Geography
- Coordinates: 35.0972°N 24.5953°E
- Archipelago: Cretan Islands

Administration
- Greece
- Region: Crete
- Regional unit: Rethymno
- Municipality: Agios Vasileios

Demographics
- Population: 0

Prasonisi (Greek: Πρασονήσι, "leek island"), is an uninhabited islet just off the coast of Crete. Administratively it lies within the Agios Vasileios municipality of Rethymno.

== See also ==
- List of islands of Greece
