= Repi =

Island in Greece

Native name: Ρέπι
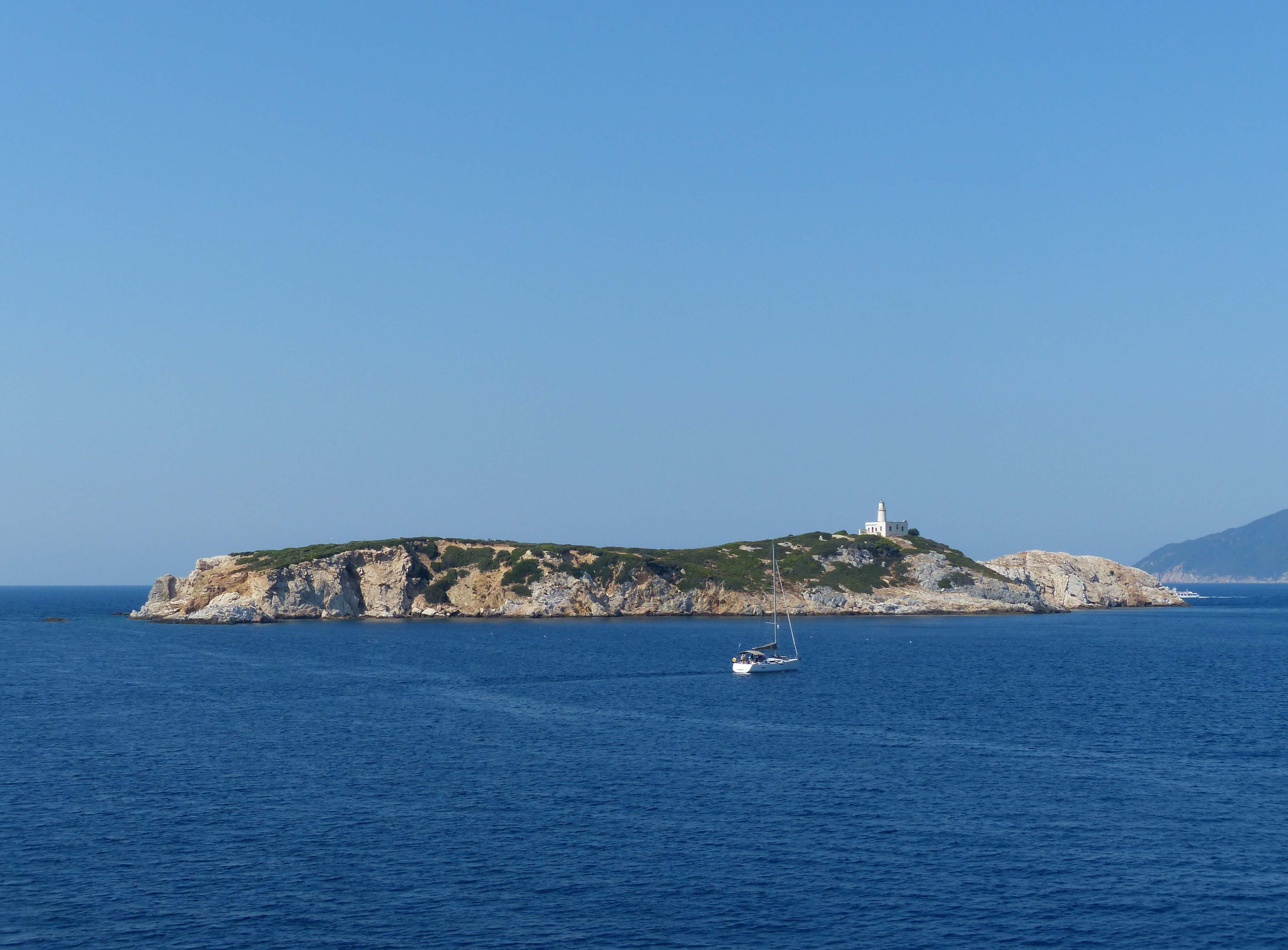
- Repi Island

- Location within Greece

Geography
- Coordinates: 39.147°N 23.529°E
- Archipelago: Sporades
- Highest elevation: 30 m (100 ft)

Administration
- Greece
- Region: Thessaly
- Regional unit: Sporades
- Municipality: Skiathos

Demographics
- Population: 0 (2011)

Repi (Greek: Ρέπι) is a small Greek island off the east coast of Skiathos, Sporades, Greece. There is an abandoned settlement on therely part of the municipality of Skbludhos. As of 2011, it had no resident population.
