= Nikolos =

Greek islet in the Aegean Sea

Native name: Νικολός
- Location within Greece

Geography
- Coordinates: 35.2044°N 25.7222°E
- Archipelago: Cretan Islands

Administration
- Greece
- Region: Crete
- Regional unit: Lasithi

Nikolos (Greek: Νικολός), also known as Nikolonisi, Nikolo Nisi, and Agios Antonios, is an island close to the northeastern coast of Crete. Administratively it comes within the Agios Nikolaos municipality in Lasithi.
