= Ithaca (regional unit) =

Ithaca Περιφερειακή ενότητα / Δήμος Ιθάκης
- Regional unit and municipality
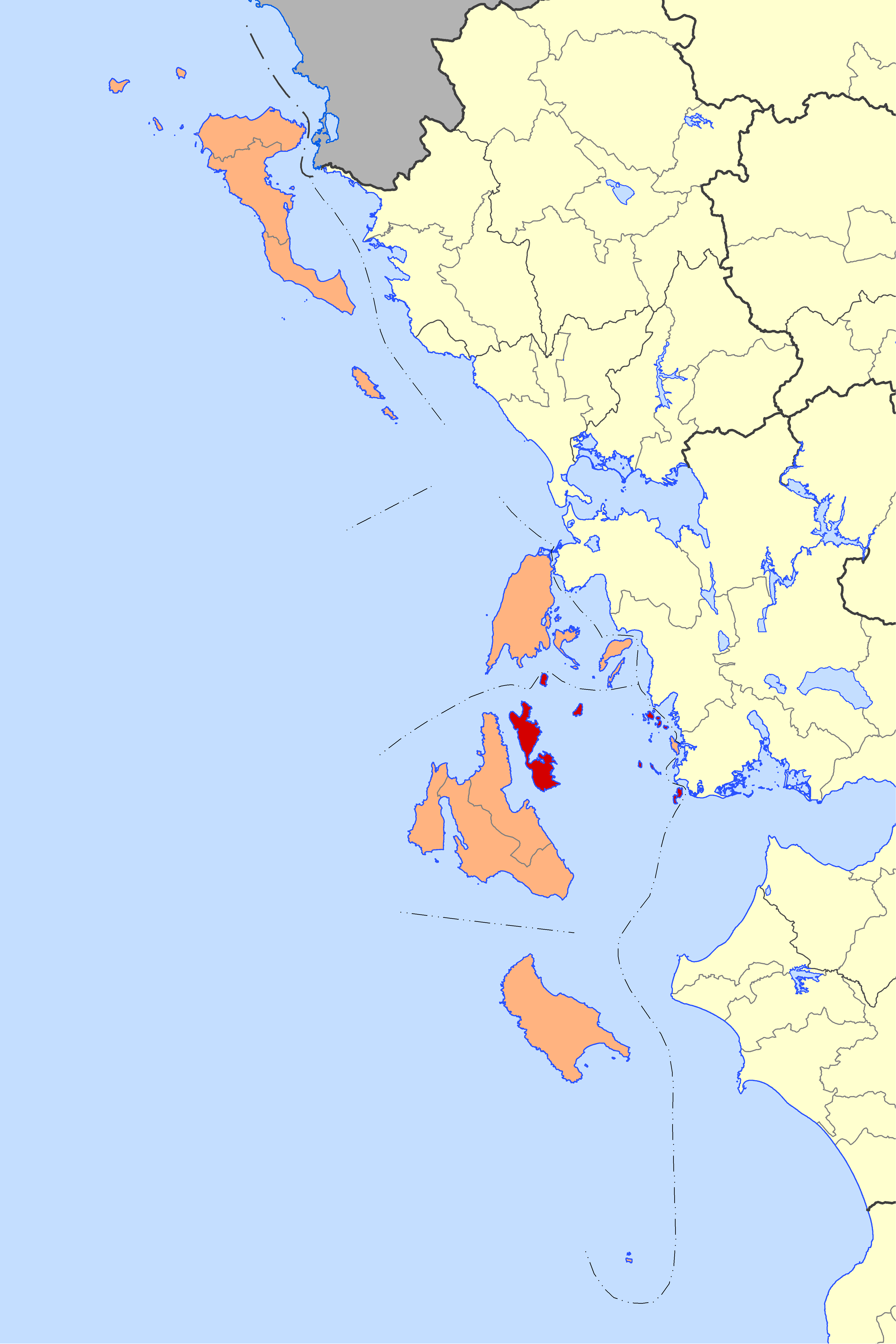
- Ithaca within Ionian Islands

- Location within Greece
- Coordinates: 38°26′00″N 20°44′54″E
- Country: Greece
- Administrative region: Ionian Islands
- Seat: Vathy

Government
  - Mayor: Dionysios Stanitsas (since 2014)

Area
  - Municipality: 117.8 km^{2} (45.5 sq mi)

Population (2021)
  - Municipality: 2,862
  - Density: 24.30/km^{2} (62.92/sq mi)
- Time zone: UTC+2 (EET)
  - Summer (DST): UTC+3 (EEST)
- Postal code: 283 0x
- Vehicle registration: KE
- Website: ithaki.gr

Ithaca (Greek: Ιθάκη) is one of the regional units of Greece. It is part of the region of the Ionian Islands. The capital of the regional unit is the town of Vathy. The regional unit consists of the islands of Ithaca, Atokos, Arkoudi, Oxeia, Drakonera and several smaller islands, all in the Ionian Sea. It has one municipality, Ithaca. The municipality includes islets other than Ithaca including two near Cape Melissa, Arkoudi and Atokos to the northeast and the numerous islets in the Echinades Island group (the larger ones being Drakonera, Makri, Oxeia, Petalas, and Vromonas) to the east near the mainland of Aetolia-Acarnania. Its largest towns are Vathy (pop. 1,676 in 2021), Perachori (368), Stavros (327), Platreithias (221), and Kioni (131).

In 2011, as part of the Kallikratis plan, the previous prefecture of Cephalonia was divided into the regional units of Cephalonia and Ithaca.

The municipality Ithaca is subdivided into the following communities:

- Ithaca (Vathy, incl. Aetos)
- Anogi
- Exogi
- Kioni
- Lefki (incl. Agios Ioannis)
- Perachori
- Platreithias (incl. Frikes)
- Stavros
