= Tsakalonisi =

Uninhabited island in Greece

Native name: Τσακαλονήσι
- Location within Greece

Geography
- Location: Ionian Sea
- Coordinates: 38.462°N 21.036°E
- Archipelago: Echinades

Administration
- Greece
- Region: Ionian Islands
- Municipality: Cephalonia

Demographics
- Population: 0 (2011)

Tsakalonisi (Greek: Τσακαλονήσι) is a small Greek island in the Ionian Sea, part of the Echinades archipelago. As of 2011, it had no resident population. It is situated 0.3 km west of Provati, 0.8 km southwest of Karlonisi, 1 km southeast of Drakonera, 4 km off the coast of Aetolia-Acarnania and 27 km east of Ithaca. It is administered by the municipality of Cephalonia.
