= List of archaeological sites of the Ionian Islands (region) =

This list is of the declared archaeological sites of Greece located within the Ionian Islands region, comprising the regional units of Cephalonia, Corfu, Ithaca, Lefkada, and Zakynthos.

== Archaeological sites ==
=== Cephalonia ===
Site	Municipality	Municipal Unit	Community	Image	Coordinates	Type	Ref.
Fiskardo, Cephalonia Φισκάρδο Κεφαλονιάς	Sami	Erisos	Fiskardo	Fiskardo, Cephalonia	38°27′44″N 20°34′38″E		166142
South of Fiskardo Bay, Cephalonia (underwater area) Νότια όρμου Φισκάρδου, Κεφαλονιά, Ενάλιος χώρος	Sami	Erisos	Fiskardo		38°27′10″N 20°35′02″E	underwater	167597
Pyrgos, Plagia, Erisos, Cephalonia Πύργος, Πλαγιά Ερίσσου, Κεφαλονιά	Sami	Erisos	Plagia		38°23′32″N 20°34′54″E		166134
North of Giagana Bay, Cephalonia (underwater area) Βόρεια όρμου Γιαγάνα, Κεφαλονιά, ενάλιος χώρος	Sami	Erisos	Neochori		38°20′52″N 20°37′26″E	underwater (Early Helladic)	167549
Palatia, Liostasia, and Karavostasi, Agia Effimia, Cephalonia Παλάτια, Λιοστάσια και Καραβοστάσι, Αγία Ευφημία, Κεφαλονιά	Sami	Pylaros	Divarata		38°18′17″N 20°34′45″E	Hellenistic	166143
Khalia, Kardakata, Cephalonia Χαλιά, Καρδακάτα, Κεφαλονιά	Argostoli	Argostoli	Thinaia		38°17′02″N 20°27′30″E		166135
Castle of Saint George, Dematora, Cephalonia Κάστρο Αγίου Γεωργίου Δεματορών, Κεφαλληνία	Lixouri	Paliki	Monopolata		38°14′02″N 20°23′01″E		166145
Ancient Pale, Lixouri, Cephalonia Αρχαία Πάλη, Ληξούρι, Κεφαλονιά	Lixouri	Paliki	Lixouri		38°13′21″N 20°26′15″E		166138
Ancient Krane, Cephalonia Αρχαία Κράνη, Κεφαλονιά	Argostoli	Argostoli	Argostoli		38°09′59″N 20°30′45″E		166148
Castle of Saint George, Cephalonia Κάστρο Αγίου Γεωργίου Κεφαλονιάς	Argostoli	Leivatho	Peratata	Castle of Saint George, Cephalonia	38°08′19″N 20°33′10″E		167155

=== Ithaca ===
Site	Municipality	Municipal Unit	Community	Image	Coordinates	Type	Ref.
School of Homer, Exogi, Ithaca Σχολή Ομήρου, Εξωγή, Ιθάκη	Ithaca	Ithaca	Exogi	School of Homer, Exogi, Ithaca	38°27′38″N 20°38′12″E		166153
Stavros, Ithaca Σταυρός, Ιθάκη	Ithaca	Ithaca	Stavros		38°26′54″N 20°38′33″E		166139
Loizos Cave, Ithaca Σπήλαιο Λοΐζου, Ιθάκη	Ithaca	Ithaca	Stavros		38°26′20″N 20°38′13″E		166147
Piso Aetos, Vathy, Ithaca Πίσω Αετός, Βαθύ Ιθάκης	Ithaca	Ithaca	Ithaca		38°21′35″N 20°40′33″E		166146
Piso Aetos, Vathy, Ithaca (underwater area) Πίσω Αετός, Βαθύ Ιθάκης, Ενάλιος χώρος	Ithaca	Ithaca	Ithaca		38°20′57″N 20°40′55″E	underwater	168153

=== Lefkada ===
Site	Municipality	Municipal Unit	Community	Image	Coordinates	Type	Ref.
Fortress of Agia Mavra, Lefkada Φρούριο Αγίας Μαύρας, Λευκάδα	Lefkada	Lefkada	Lefkada	Fortress of Agia Mavra, Lefkada	38°50′47″N 20°43′48″E		165057
Lefkada City Πόλη Λευκάδας	Lefkada	Lefkada	Lefkada		38°49′52″N 20°42′22″E		165055
Ancient Lefkada Αρχαία Λευκάδα	Lefkada	Lefkada	Lefkada		38°49′00″N 20°42′00″E		166877
Nydri Plain, Nikiana, Lefkada Πεδιάδα Νυδρίου, Νικιάνα, Λευκάδα	Lefkada	Ellomenos	Nydri		38°42′18″N 20°41′48″E		166876
Nydri - Vlycho, Lefkada Νυδρί - Βλυχός, Λευκάδα	Lefkada	Ellomenos	Vlycho		38°41′43″N 20°42′02″E		165690
Steno, Nydri, Lefkada Στενό Νυδρίου, Λευκάδα	Lefkada	Ellomenos	Nydri	Steno, Nydri, Lefkada	38°41′45″N 20°42′17″E		167552
Nira, Lefkada Νηρά Λευκάδας	Lefkada	Apollonioi	Athani		38°35′17″N 20°32′50″E	Palaeolithic	167909
Lefkata Peninsula, Lefkada Χερσόνησος Λευκάτα, Λευκάδα	Lefkada	Apollonioi	Athani	Lefkata Peninsula, Lefkada	38°34′49″N 20°33′24″E		167510
Podi Peninsula, Meganisi, Lefkada Χερσόνησος Πόδι Μεγανησίου Λευκάδας	Meganisi	Meganisi	Spartochori		38°37′03″N 20°45′41″E		168169

=== Zakynthos ===
Site	Municipality	Municipal Unit	Community	Image	Coordinates	Type	Ref.
Kampi, Exo Chora, Zakynthos Καμπί, Έξω Χώρα Ζακύνθου	Zakynthos	Elatia	Exo Chora		37°46′40″N 20°41′05″E	Mycenaean	167819

== See also ==
- Cultural heritage of Greece
- Greek Archaeological Service
