= Phaneromeni Monastery, Lefkada =

Monastery in Artaion Municipality, Greece

Phaneromeni Monastery
- Μονή Φανερωμένης Λευκάδας
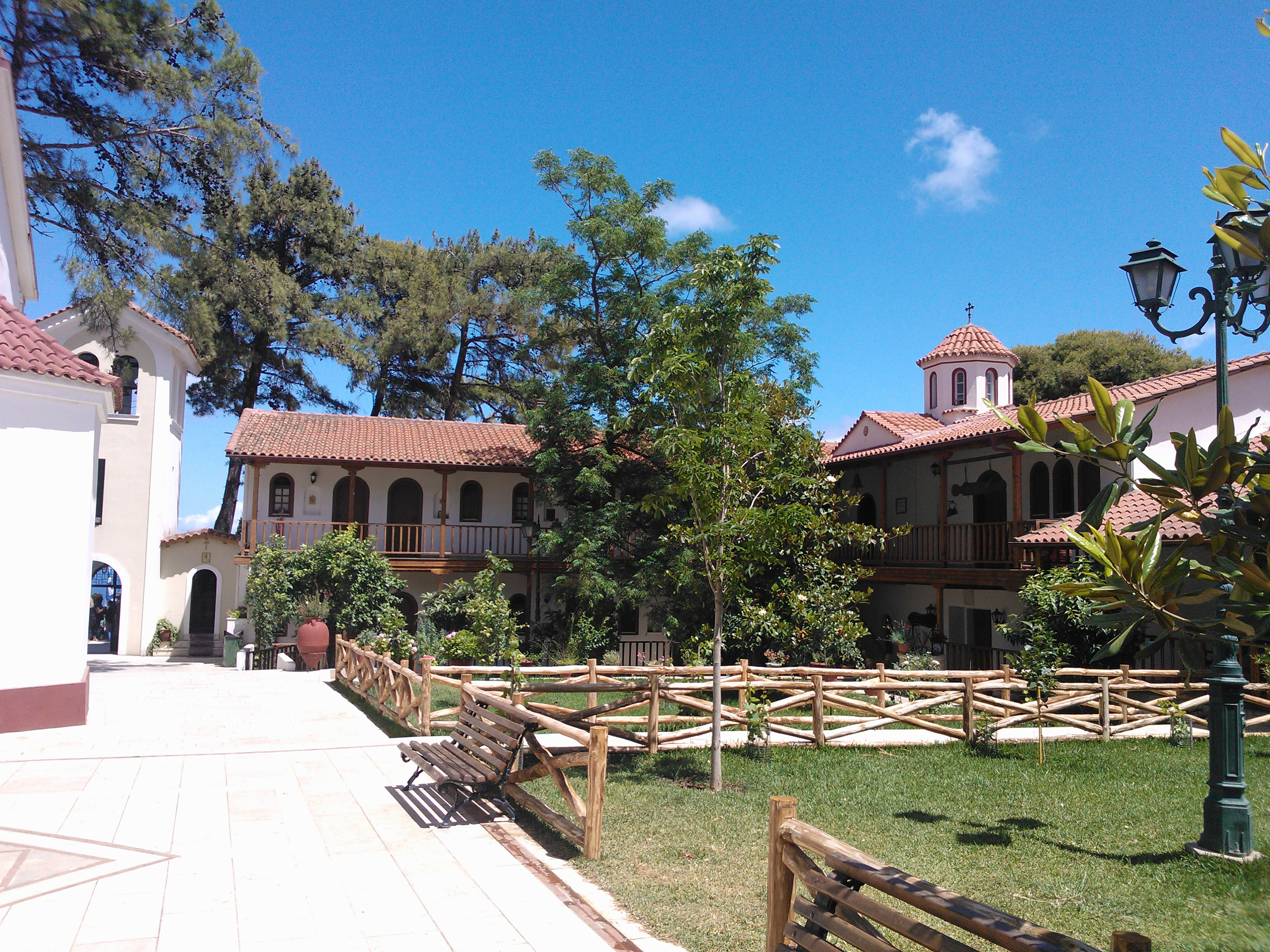
- Interactive map of Phaneromeni Monastery

Monastery information
- Established: 1634
- Dedication: Dormition of Theotokos
- Celebration: Monday of Holy Spirit
- Diocese: Metropolis of Lefkada and Ithaca

Site
- Location: Lefkada City, Lefkada
- Country: Greece
- Coordinates: 39°21′21″N 20°59′43″E

The Holy Monastery of Holiness Pephaneromeni Theotokos of Lefkada (Greek: Ιερά Μονή Υπεραγίας Θεοτόκου Πεφανερωμένης Λευκάδος) is a historical monastery located in Lefkada. Just 3 km from the town of Lefkada, it has been the religious center of the island for centuries as the oldest and largest monastery, but also the religious point of reference for Lefkadians everywhere.

Panagia Faneromeni is dedicated to the Dormition of the Theotokos who is also the protector and patron of the island. The monastery celebrates every year the Monday of the Holy Spirit (movable holiday), where pilgrims flock from all over Lefkada and the surrounding areas. It is a male monastery with an abbot and four monks.

== History ==
Tradition says that the area where the monastery is located, 3 kilometers to the west of the city of Lefkada near the village of Fryni, hosted in ancient times a marble sanctuary of the goddess Artemis. On his way from the area of Nikopolis to neighboring Preveza, the apostle Paul sent in 63 AD. on the island the three helpers, Akyla, Sosiona and Herodion. The three of them invited the Lefkadians to that place and preached the teachings of Jesus. They later built a church in honor of the Virgin Mary, thus creating the first church on the island. The apostle Paul ordained Sosionas the first bishop of Lefkada.

In 332 AD the then bishop of Lefkada Agatharchos and two fathers settled in the temple, expanded it and built the first cells, thus laying the foundations of monasticism on the island. In the 5th century AD the icon of the Theotokos was ordered in Constantinople. The venerable hieromonk and iconographer Kallistos undertook to design it. The image was miraculously presented in front of him drawn "unmade" on the wood and he completed the colors, which is why it was called "Manifested".

In the years that followed, the island would meet many conquerors and the monastery would receive successive blows and disasters. In 1734 AD, while the island was under Venetian rule, the central church was built in its current form. This same temple was completely burnt in 1886 and was rebuilt and renovated. The iconostasis built in 1887 is the work of Efstratios Prosalenis while the icons were added later, in 1919, and were designed by the brothers Christodoulos and Thomas Zografos. The icon of the Theotokos that exists today is a copy of the miraculous icon, crafted by hieromonk Benjamin Kontrakis on Mount Athos in 1887.

== Places of the Monastery ==
- Catholic: Central church of the Monastery, dedicated to the Descent of the Holy Spirit.
- Synodic: Reception and hospitality area for pilgrims.
- Archontariki: Accommodation for pilgrims, the monastery can host up to 50 pilgrims who can stay for one night.
- Library: The library of the monastery houses more than 2000 titles, among which important books such as
  - Manuscript Gospel of the 15th century
  - 18th century Psychofelestato triode
  - Manuscript Gospel of the 17th century
  - Monthly September 18th century
  - Holy Gospel of the 18th century
  - Divine and Holy Gospel of the 17th century
  - Divine and Holy Gospel of the 17th century
  - Manuscript book of psychophiles of 1691
- Chapel of Saint Siluanos of Athonite: A small Byzantine church with a dome in which Holy Relics are kept.
