= Navtilos =

Navtilos (Greek: Ναυτίλος) may refer to:

- Navtilos, a volcanic dome on the island Nea Kameni, Santorini
- Navtilos (Antikythera), an islet north of the coast of Antikythera
