= Apasa (Echinades) =

Greek islet in the Ionian Sea

Native name: Άπασα
- Location within Greece

Geography
- Location: Ionian Sea
- Coordinates: 38.4315°N 21.0245°E
- Archipelago: Echinades
- Area: 0.024 km^{2} (0.0093 sq mi)
- Highest elevation: 17 m (56 ft)

Administration
- Greece
- Region: Ionian Islands
- Municipality: Cephalonia

Demographics
- Population: 0 (2011)

Apasa (Greek: Άπασα) is an islet east of Ithaca, one of the Echinades (Modia subgroup), an island group in the Ionian Sea in Greece. As of 2011, it had no resident population.
