= Lamprinos =

Greek island in the Ionian Sea

Native name: Λαμπρινός
- Location within Greece

Geography
- Location: Ionian Sea
- Coordinates: 38.473°N 21.005°E
- Archipelago: Echinades
- Area: 0.352 km^{2} (0.136 sq mi)
- Highest elevation: 61 m (200 ft)

Administration
- Greece
- Region: Ionian Islands
- Municipality: Cephalonia

Demographics
- Population: 0 (2011)

Lamprinos (Greek: Λαμπρινός) is an island of the Echinades (Drakoneres subgroup), among the Ionian Islands group of Greece. As of 2011, it had no resident population.
