= Atokos =

Greek island in the Ionian Sea

Native name: Άτοκος
- Location within Greece

Geography
- Location: Ionian Sea
- Coordinates: 38°29′17″N 20°48′43″E
- Archipelago: Echinean Islands
- Area: 4.7 km^{2} (1.8 sq mi)
- Highest elevation: 334 m (1096 ft)

Administration
- Greece
- Region: Ionian Islands
- Municipality: Ithaca

Demographics
- Population: 0 (2011)

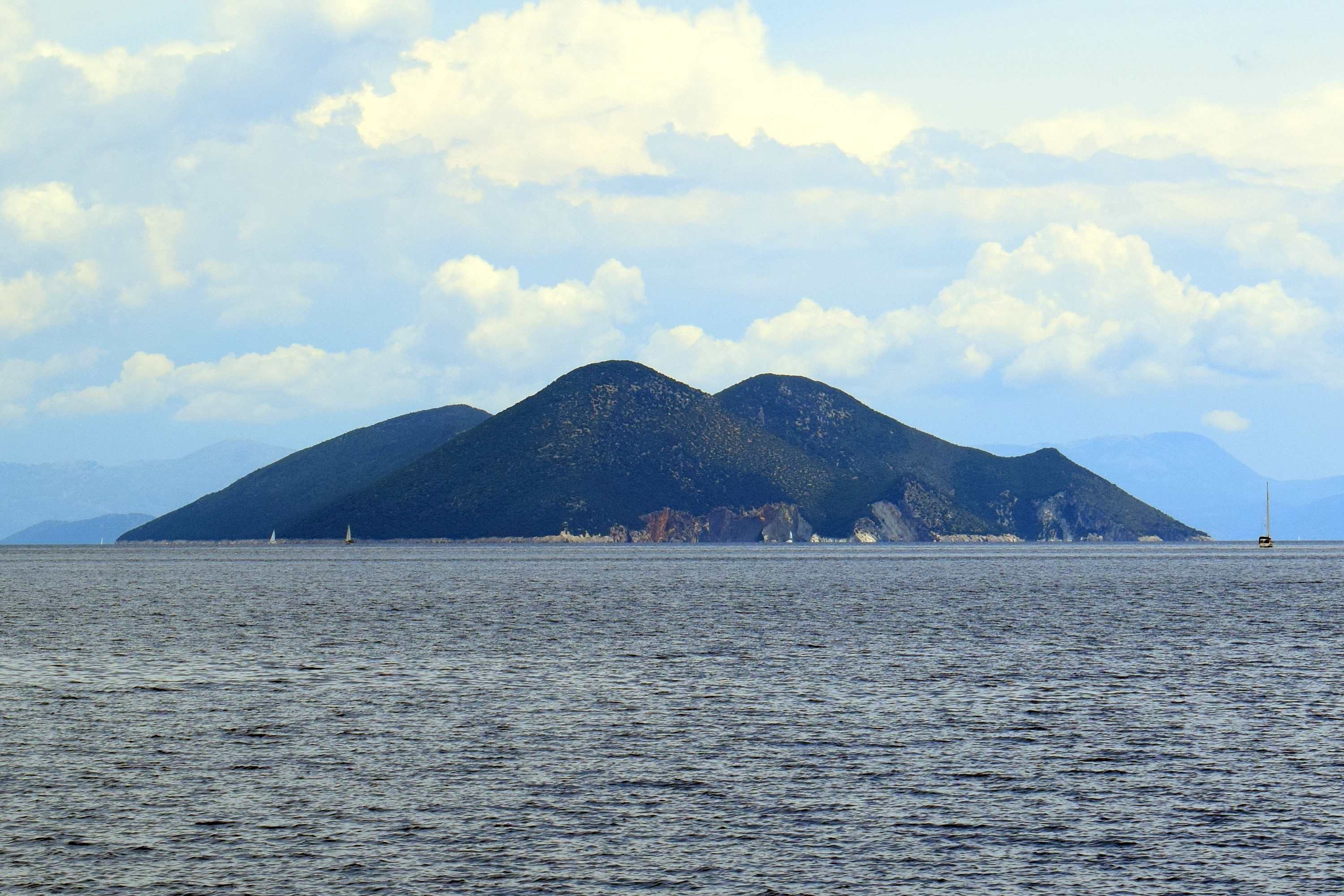
Atokos from the south in the shipping channel; Cliff Bay is to the right

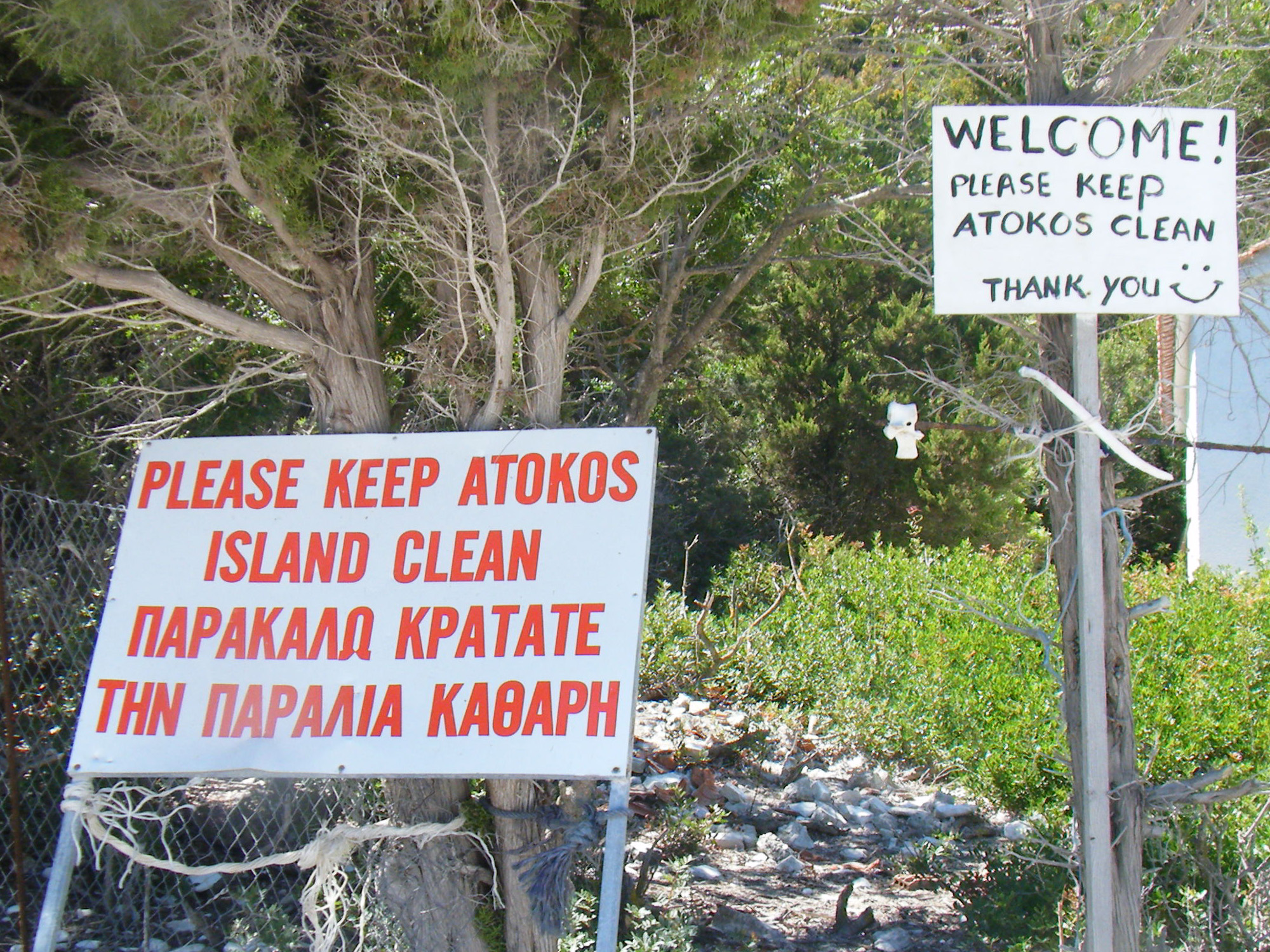
Atokos welcomes tidy visitors

Atokos (Greek: Άτοκος) is a small, uninhabited Greek island in the Ionian Sea off the coast of Acarnania and is one of the most westerly and perhaps remotest of the Echinades Islands. As of 2011, it had no resident population. It lies 9 kilometres (6 miles) north-east of Ithaca and 8 kilometres (5 miles) south-west of Kastos, just north-east of the main shipping and ferry channel between Brindisi in Italy and Patras on the Peloponnese.

From such large vessels you can get a reasonable view of the south-western end (narrow aspect) of the island and its steep cliffs. Access requires a private boat, and safe mooring is available only in calm weather at one of its two key anchorages: One House Bay on the east coast and Cliff Bay on the south coast. The former is the preferred option as it shelters boats from the prevailing north-west winds and has better access to the island via a pebbled beach and small flat hinterland.

The island is administered by the municipality of Ithaca, but is a private island, owned by the shipping magnate Panayiotis Tsakos. It is uninhabited except for a few goats that roam freely. The animals appear to be tended by a shepherd who visits the flock every fourth day, as part of an agreement with the current owner.

Visitors are allowed to land on the island. A small chapel has an open door to visitors and appears to be cleaned and well maintained. The chapel can be found by following a short path from the beach at One House Bay, and past the island's well and supply of brackish water. Confusingly, the small holy building is not the "one house" that gives the main bay its name. To locate the simple two-storey house after which the bay is named, follow another short path at the north end of the beach through the noisy cicada-filled woods towards the foot of the main hill. The house is locked but is habitable, presumably for use by the owner's family, who sometimes visit in September.

The island was on the market in 2015 for €44 million with potential for hotel development, but the island is inside a NATURA 2000 area and is close to the island of Oxia, which was sold in 2013 to Sheikh Hamad bin Khalifa al-Thani, the Emir of Qatar, for €4.9M, so the asking price seemed unrealistic.

In the 2020s, Atokos has become remarkable due to the wild boars that roam its beaches and sometimes swim in the sea.
