= Oxia =

Oxia (Ancient Greek: ὀξεῖᾰ, Modern Greek: οξεία) may refer to:

- the acute accent in polytonic Greek
- Oxeia, a Greek island
- a 1988 concept car by Peugeot
- Oxia Palus quadrangle, one of the 30 quadrangles of the plant Mars
- Oxia Planum, a plain on the planet Mars
