= Soros (Echinades) =

Islet in one of the Ionian Islands in Greece

Native name: Σωρός
- Location within Greece

Geography
- Location: Ionian Sea
- Coordinates: 38.435°N 21.025°E
- Archipelago: Echinades
- Area: 0.038 km^{2} (0.015 sq mi)
- Highest elevation: 31 m (102 ft)

Administration
- Greece
- Region: Ionian Islands
- Municipality: Cephalonia

Demographics
- Population: 0 (2011)

Soros (Greek: Σωρός) is an islet in the Echinades, one of the Ionian Islands in Greece. As of 2011, it had no resident population.
