= Pontikos =

Greek island in the Ionian Sea

Native name: Ποντικός
- Location within Greece

Geography
- Location: Ionian Sea
- Coordinates: 38°27′18″N 21°03′58″E
- Archipelago: Echinades
- Area: 0.736 km^{2} (0.284 sq mi)
- Highest elevation: 62 m (203 ft)

Administration
- Greece
- Region: Ionian Islands
- Municipality: Ithaca

Demographics
- Population: 0 (2011)

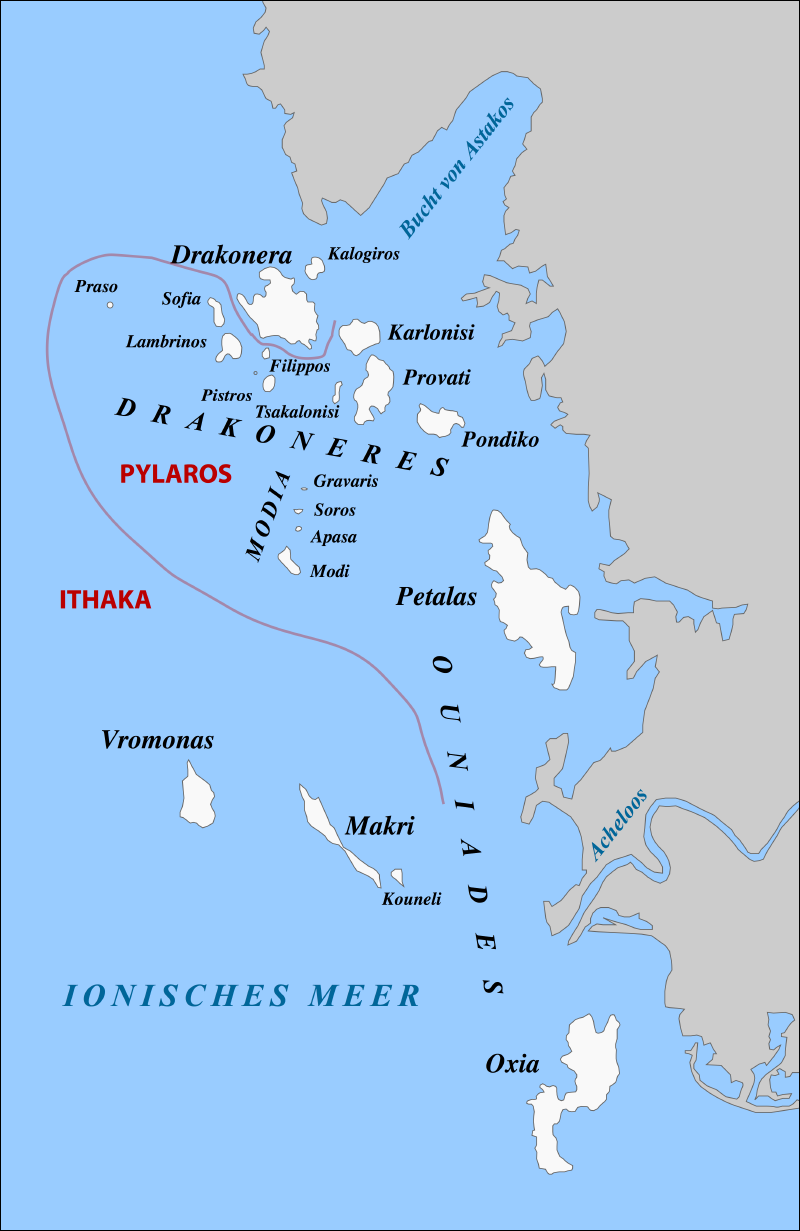
Echinades Archipelagos, Greece

Pontikos (Greek: Ποντικός) is an island of the Echinades, among the Ionian Islands group of Greece. As of 2011, it had no resident population.
