= Drakoneras =

Coordinates: 38.468°N 21.032°E

The Drakoneras or Dhragonares form the northerly grouping of the Echinades islands, which are part of the Ionian Islands group of Greece. They lie 5.5 kilometres (3.4 mi) north of the other islands in the group. The name of the group comes from the island Drakonera (Dhragonára) which is the chief island of the Drakoneras.

The islands are mostly high, with rocks and boulders, and mostly cultivated. The islands can be divided into two groups. The southern group includes Stamodi, Apasa, Soros, and Gravaras. The northern group consists of a number of small islands and rocks, of which the most important are Pontikos, Provati, Karlonisi, Kalogiros, and Drakonera.
