= Kalogiros (Echinades) =

Greek island in the Ionian Sea

Native name: Καλόγηρος
- Location within Greece

Geography
- Location: Ionian Sea
- Coordinates: 38.491°N 21.030°E
- Archipelago: Echinades
- Area: 0.249 km^{2} (0.096 sq mi)

Administration
- Greece
- Region: Ionian Islands
- Municipality: Cephalonia

Demographics
- Population: 0 (2011)

Kalogiros (Greek: Καλόγηρος) is a small island of the Echinades (Drakoneres subgroup), among the Ionian Islands group of Greece. As of 2011, it had no resident population.
