= Sofía (Echinades) =

Greek island in the Ionian Sea

Sofia
Native name: Σοφία
- Location within Greece

Geography
- Location: Ionian Sea
- Coordinates: 38°28′44″N 21°00′04″E
- Archipelago: Echinades
- Area: 0.174 km^{2} (0.067 sq mi)

Administration
- Greece
- Region: Ionian Islands
- Municipality: Cephalonia

Demographics
- Population: 0 (2011)

Sofia (Greek: Σοφία or Σοφιά also Isle of Gaia) is an island of the Echinades, among the Ionian Islands group of Greece. As of 2011, it had no resident population.

In June 2015 it was reported that Brad Pitt and Angelina Jolie were considering buying the 17 hectares (42 acres) island for $4.7 million. It has planning permission for six villas.
