= Pistros =

Island in Greece

Native name: Πίστρος
- Location within Greece

Geography
- Location: Ionian Sea
- Coordinates: 38°27′50″N 21°00′58″E
- Archipelago: Echinades
- Area: 0.114 km^{2} (0.044 sq mi)
- Highest elevation: 41 m (135 ft)

Administration
- Greece
- Region: Ionian Islands
- Municipality: Cephalonia

Demographics
- Population: 0 (2011)

Pistros (Greek: Πίστρος) is an islet between Ithaca and mainland Greece, one of the Ionian Islands. As of 2011, it had no resident population.
