= Petalas =

Island in Greece

Native name: Πεταλάς
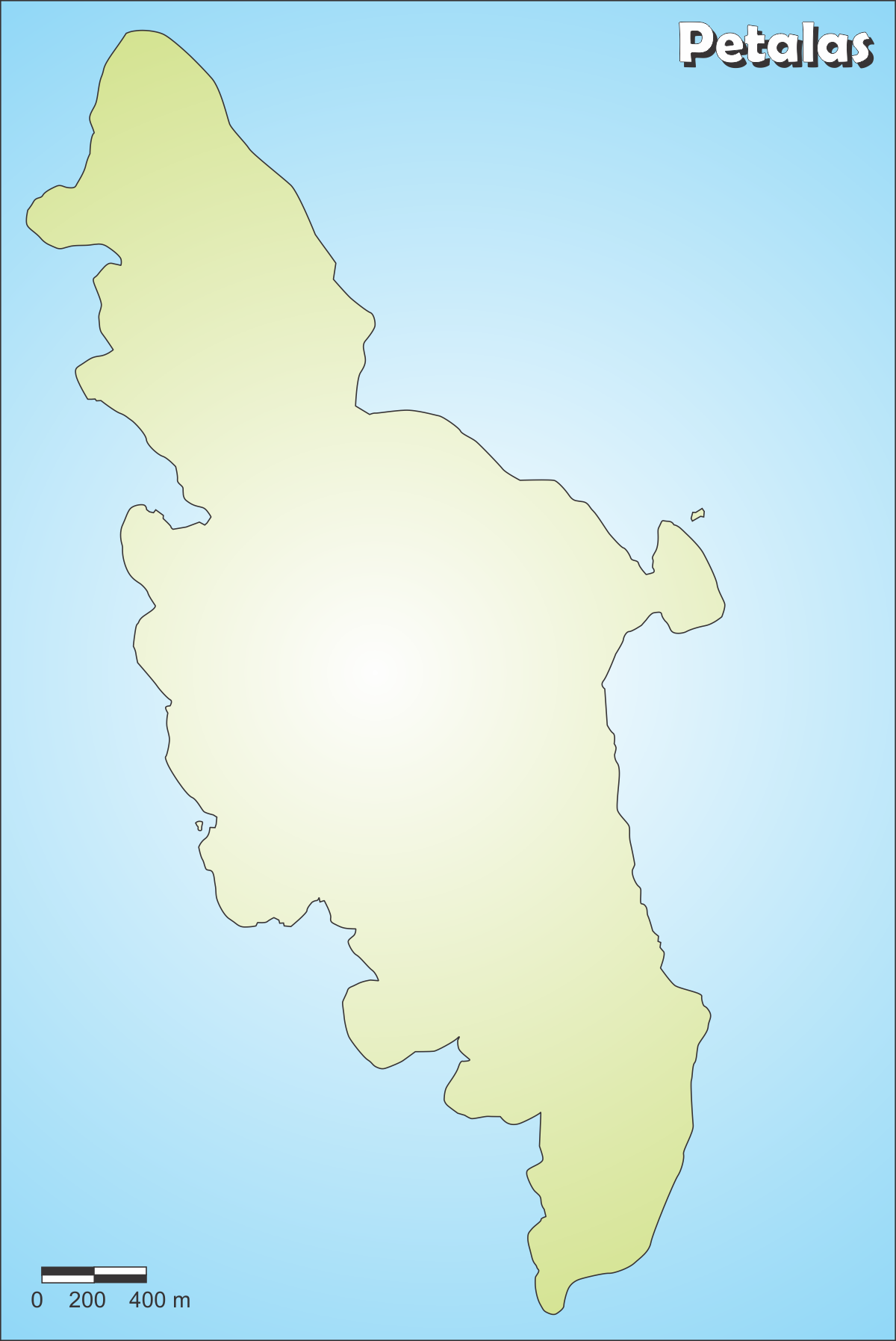
- Simple map of the island Petalas in Greece, part of Ionian Islands

- Location within Greece

Geography
- Location: Ionian Sea
- Coordinates: 38°24′50″N 21°05′31″E
- Archipelago: Echinades
- Area: 5.497 km^{2} (2.122 sq mi)
- Highest elevation: 251 m (823 ft)

Administration
- Greece
- Region: Ionian Islands
- Municipality: Cephalonia

Demographics
- Population: 0 (2011)

Petalas (Greek: Πεταλάς) is the largest island of the Echinades, among the Ionian Islands in Greece. As of 2011, it had no resident population. The largest private island in Greece, it is located in the Ionian Sea. Covering an area of 5.5 square kilometres or 2.1 square miles, the island is known for its natural beauty, with around 4,000 olive trees and surrounded by clear blue waters.

Privately owned, 85% of it belonging to the Tsaoussis family, while the remaining 15% is under the ownership of the nearby island of Kefalonia.

Some, including William Martin Leake, have suggested that Petalas is the site of ancient Dulichium, from which 40 ships sailed to Troy in the Iliad. However, Strabo and most modern authors have identified Dulichium as Makri, a nearby island in the Echinades.
