= Apollonia (Echinades) =

Apollonia (Ancient Greek: Ἀπολλωνία) was an ancient town on one of the islands of the Echinades in ancient Acarnania.

Its site is unlocated.
