= Echinades =

Group of islands in the Ionian Sea

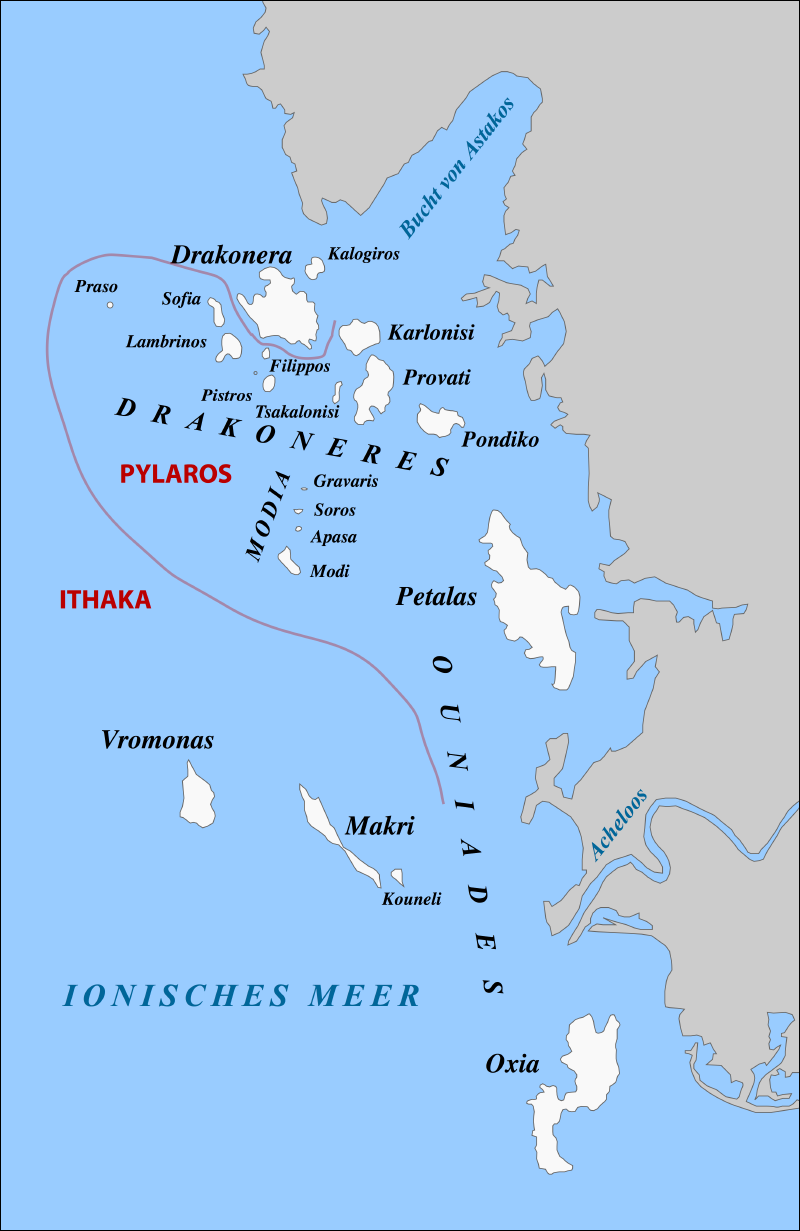
The Echinades

The Echinades (/ɪˈkɪnədiːz/; Greek: αἱ Ἐχινάδες νῆσοι per Herodotus, Thucydides, and Strabo, per Homer Echinae (αἱ Ἐχῖναι νῆσοι, Italian: Curzolari) are a group of islands in the Ionian Sea, off the coast of Acarnania, Greece. The archipelago is commonly subdivided into three groups: the Drakoneres in the north, the Modia in the middle and the Ouniades in the south. Administratively, the Echinades form part of two regional units: Ithaca and Cephalonia. Six of the islands, including Oxeia, one of the largest, are owned by Sheikh Hamad bin Khalifa al-Thani, the emir of Qatar, who purchased them for a reported £7.3 million sterling. The Battle of the Echinades in 1427 and the Battle of Lepanto in 1571 were fought at or near the islands.

== History ==
Several of the islands have been joined to the mainland by alluvial deposits. Herodotus says that half of the islands had been already united to the mainland in his time (ii. 10); and Thucydides expected that this would be the case with all of them before long, since they lay so close together as to be easily connected by the alluvium brought down by the Achelous River (ii. 102.). This expectation, however, has not been fulfilled, which Pausanias attributed (viii. 24. § 11) to the Achelous bringing down less alluvium in consequence of the uncultivated condition of Aetolia; but there can be little doubt that it is owing to the increasing depth of the sea, which prevents any perceptible progress being made.

The Echinades are mentioned by Homer, who, in the Iliad, says that Meges, son of Phyleus, led 40 ships to Troy from Dulichium and the sacred islands Echinae, which are situated beyond the sea, opposite Elis. Phyleus was the son of Augeas, king of the Epeians in Elis, who emigrated to Dulichium because he had incurred his father's anger. In the Odyssey, Dulichium (which may be an island in the Echniades) is frequently mentioned along with Same (Kefalonia), Zacynthus, and Ithaca as one of the islands subject to Ulysses, and is celebrated for its fertility. Strabo, and most modern writers, place Dulichium among the Echinades, most identifying it with the island of Makri. Euripides (in Iphigeneia at Aulis) identifies the Echinades with the islands of Taphos (Taphiae Insulae). However, most modern scholars, including the editors of the Barrington Atlas of the Greek and Roman World, place the island of Taphos at Meganisi east of Lefkada, quite northwest of the Echinades; hence, the islands of Taphos would include Meganisi, Kalamos, Kastos, and surrounding islands.

Homer, as we have already seen, describes the Echinades as inhabited; but both Thucydides and Scylax represent them as deserted. Strabo simply says that they were barren and rugged (x. p. 458). Stephanus of Byzantium names a town Apollonia situated in one of the islands (s. v. Ἀπολλωνία). Pliny the Elder gives us the names of nine of these islands — Aegialia, Cotonis, Thyatira, Geoaris, Dionysia, Cyrnus, Chalcis, Pinara, Mystus. Another of the Echinades was Artemita (Ἀρτεμίτα), which became united to the mainland. Artemidorus spoke of Artemita as a peninsula near the mouth of the Achelous, and Rhianus connected it with the Oxeiae (Oxeias, Oxiés, or Scrofés) islands. (Steph. B. s. v. Ἀπτεμίτα) The Oxeiae (αἱ Ὀξεῖαι) are sometimes spoken of as a separate group of islands to the west or south of the Echinades, but are included by Strabo under the general name of Echinades (x. p. 458). The Oxeiae, according to Strabo, are mentioned by Homer under the synonymous name of Thoae or Thoai.

== Name ==
The Echinades derived their name from the echinus or the sea urchin, in consequence of their sharp and prickly outlines. For the same reason they were called Oxeiae, or the Sharp Islands, a name which one of them still retains under the slightly altered form of Oxeia (Oxiés, Oxiá, or Oxia). Leake remarks that the Echinades are divided into two clusters, besides Petalas (Petalá), which, being, quite barren and close to the mainland, is not claimed, or at least is not occupied by the Ithacans, though anciently it was undoubtedly one of the Echinades. The northern cluster is commonly called the Drakoneres, from Drakonera, the principal island; and the southern, the Ouniades or Oxeiae. By the Venetians they were known as the islands of Kurtzolári, which name belongs properly to a peninsula to the left of the mouth of the Achelous, near Oxeia. Seventeen of the islands have names, besides the four Modia (Stamodio or Módi Islands), two of which are mere rocks, and nine of the seventeen are cultivated. These are, beginning from the south — Oxeia (Oxiá), Makri (Makrí), Vrómonas (Vromotas or Vrómona), Pontikos (Pondikónisi), Karlonísi (Karlónísi), Prováti, Lampriní (Lambrinó), Sofía (Sofiá), also known as Gaia, Drakonera (Dhragonára). Oxeia alone is lofty (421 meters). Makri and Vrómonas are the two islands next in importance.

Name	Greek	Community	Subgroup	Area (km^{2})	Highest point	Location
Praso	Πράσο	Pylaros	Drakoneres			38°28′58″N 20°58′10″E
Sofia	Σοφία	Pylaros	Drakoneres	0.174		38°28′49″N 21°0′5″E
Lamprinos	Λαμπρινός	Pylaros	Drakoneres	0.352	61 m	38°28′22″N 21°0′18″E
Drakonera	Δρακονέρα	Ithaka	Drakoneres	2.442	137 m	38°28′51″N 21°1′15″E
Filippos	Φίλιππος	Pylaros	Drakoneres	0.046		38°28′17″N 21°0′55″E
Pistros	Πίστρος	Pylaros	Drakoneres	0.114	41 m	38°27′51″N 21°0′58″E
Kalogiros	Καλόγηρος	Pylaros	Drakoneres	0.249		38°29′28″N 21°1′49″E
Karlonisi	Καρλονήσι	Ithaka	Drakoneres	0.719	77 m	38°28′32″N 21°2′35″E
Tsakalonisi	Τσακαλονήσι	Pylaros	Drakoneres	0.1		38°27′44″N 21°2′11″E
Provati	Προβάτι	Ithaka	Drakoneres	1.21	75 m	38°27′48″N 21°2′53″E
Pontikos	Ποντικός	Ithaka	Drakoneres	0.736		38°27′17″N 21°3′59″E
Girovaris or Gkravaris	Γηρόβαρης or Γκράβαρης	Pylaros	Modia		24 m	38°26′24″N 21°1′36″E
Soros	Σωρός	Pylaros	Modia	0.038	31 m	38°26′5″N 21°1′30″E
Apasa	Άπασα	Pylaros	Modia	0.024	17 m	38°25′53″N 21°1′29″E
Modio or Modi	Μοδιό or Μόδι	Pylaros	Modia	0.258	66 m	38°25′25″N 21°1′20″E
Petalas	Πεταλάς	Pylaros	Ouniades	5.497	251 m	38°24′50″N 21°5′41″E
Vromonas	Βρομώνας	Ithaka	Ouniades	1.047	141 m	38°22′9″N 20°59′43″E
Makri	Μάκρη	Ithaka	Ouniades	0.983	126 m	38°21′30″N 21°2′19″E
Kouneli or Makropoula	Κουνέλι or Μακροπούλα	Ithaka	Ouniades	0.095	126 m	38°21′6″N 21°3′17″E
Oxeia	Οξεία	Ithaka	Ouniades	4.223	421 m	38°18′13″N 21°6′39″E
