= Vromonas =

Greek island in the Ionian Sea

Native name: Βρομώνας
- Location within Greece

Geography
- Location: Ionian Sea
- Coordinates: 38.369°N 20.995°E
- Archipelago: Echinades
- Area: 1.047 km^{2} (0.404 sq mi)
- Highest elevation: 141 m (463 ft)

Administration
- Greece
- Region: Ionian Islands
- Municipality: Ithaca

Demographics
- Population: 0 (2011)

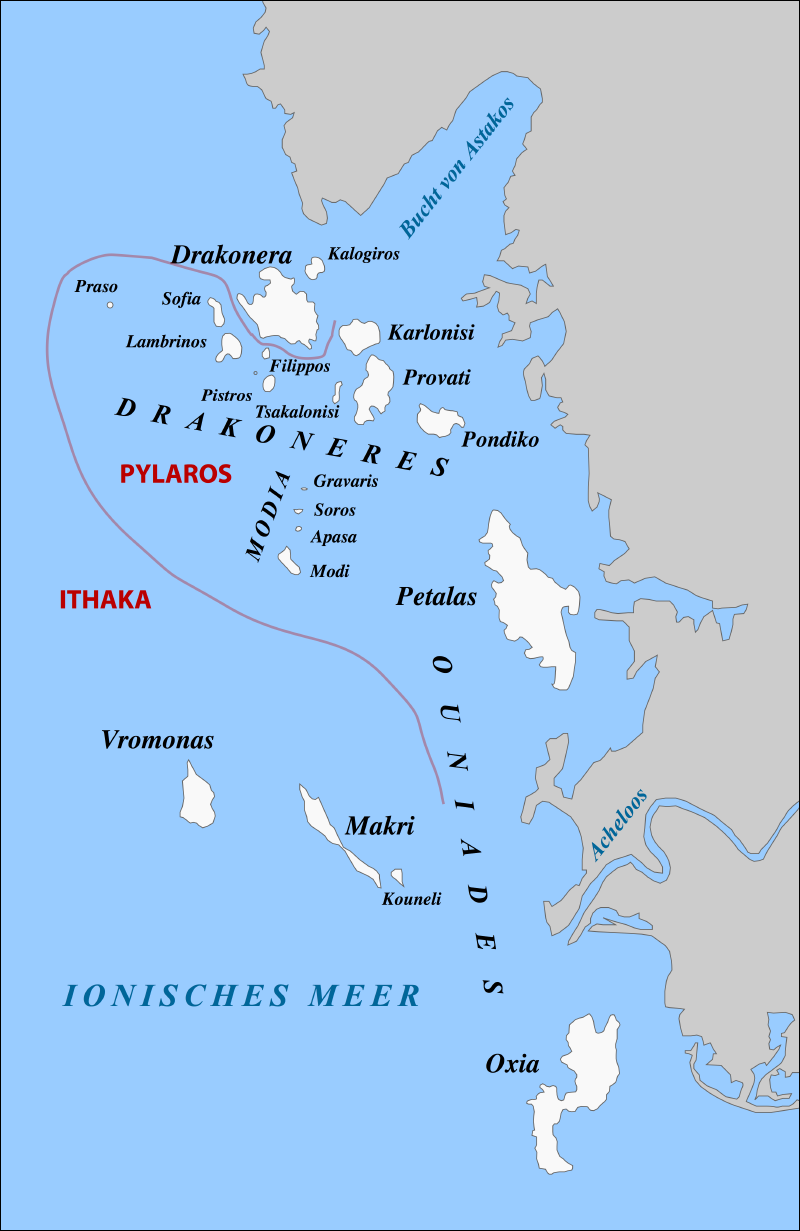
Vromonas is pictured as part of the Echinades Archipelagos, Greece

Vromonas (Greek: Βρομώνας) is a Greek island in the Ionian Islands located east of the island of Ithaca. As of 2011, it had no resident population.
