= Girovaris =

Greek island in the Ionian Sea

Coordinates: 38°26′24″N 21°01′35″E

Girovaris (Greek: Γηρόβαρης), also known as Gkravaris (Greek: Γκράβαρης), is an island of the Echinades, among the Ionian Islands group of Greece. As of 2011, it had no resident population. Administratively, it is part of the municipal unit Pylaros.
