= Holy Icon of Holiness Pephaneromeni Theotokos of Lefkada =

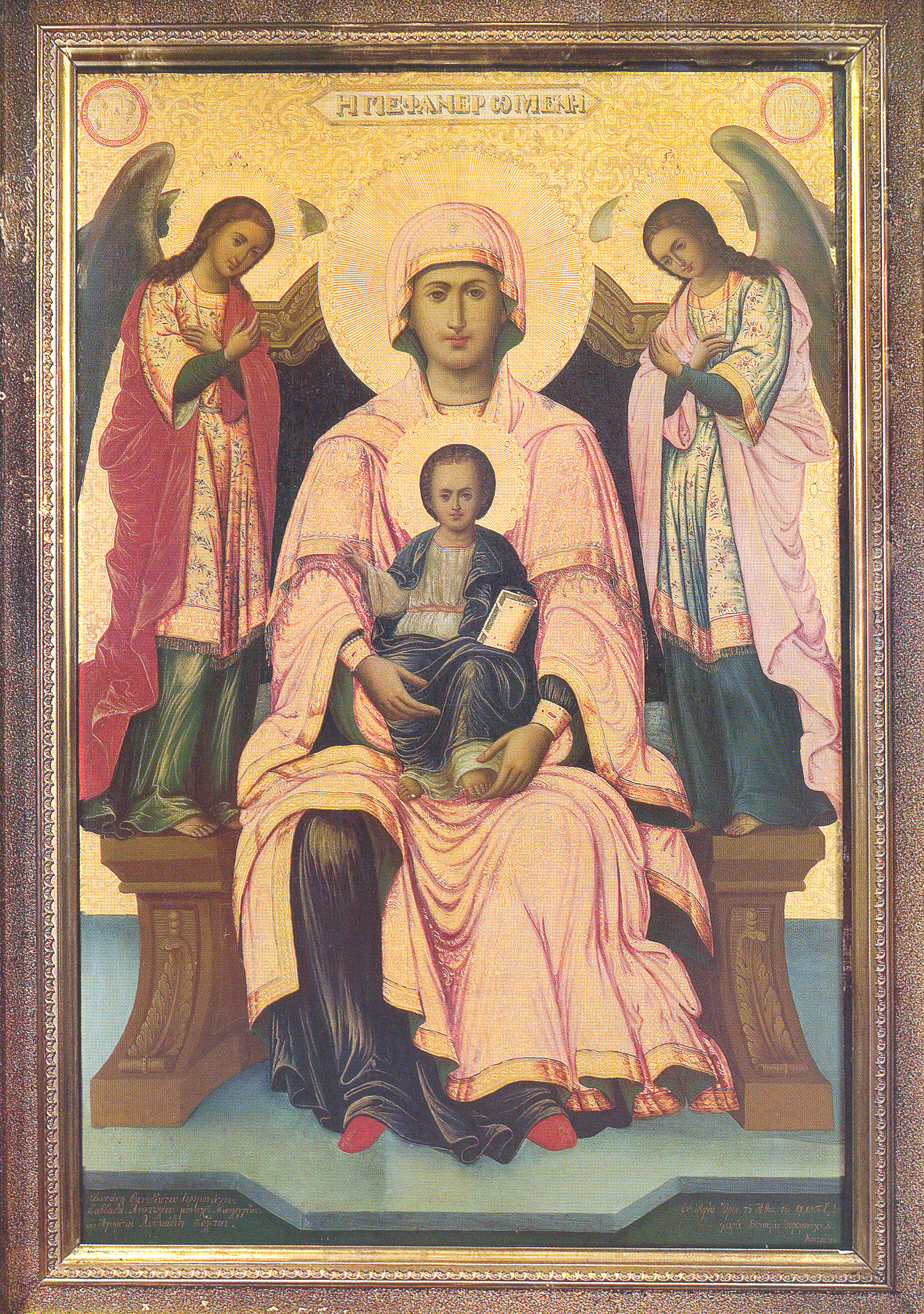
The Holy Icon of Holiness Pephaneromeni Theotokos of Lefkada

The Holy Icon of Holiness Pephaneromeni Theotokos Lefkada (also known by the nicknames "Panagia Phaneromeni" or "Kyra Phaneromeni") is a sacred relic and work of art from the 19th century. This is one of the famous icons of the Theotokos that is kept in the Holy Monastery Phaneromeni of Lefkada.

== Historical evidence ==
The history of the Holy Icon is closely intertwined with the history of the Holy Monastery and is divided into two periods: The period of the first (original) icon and the period of the second icon.

=== First icon (5th century AD – 1886) ===
The Monastery is presented for the first time in 332 AD. where, in a pre-existing church dedicated to the Virgin Mary, two monks settled and built the first cells. According to tradition in the 5th century AD. the monks of the Monastery order the canonization of the Holy Icon in Constantinople. There the work is undertaken by a hieromonk, Kallistos, vicar of the church of Saint Sophia and iconographer.

Kallistos had not thought about the subject of the image and while he had prepared the board on which he would paint it, he had not arrived at the form he would give to the Theotokos. Thus, and according to tradition, after days of prayer and fasting the image of the Theotokos appeared on the wood and then he added the colors. For this reason, because the form of the Theotokos was revealed, he also gave the image the title "Pephaneromeni" (the one who has been revealed). For the same reason he got the nickname "Handmade" (not made by human hands). The icon arrived in Lefkada and was celebrated on the Saturday of the Akathistos Hymn.

During the following centuries there is information only from oral traditions about some miracles. In 1642, the Catholic Church of the Monastery was destroyed by fire, but not the icon. The same did not happen in 1886 when a great fire completely destroyed the catholicon and the Holy Icon. This is also the end of the period of the first picture.

=== Second icon (1887 – present) ===
After the destruction of the Catholic Church and the icon in 1886, the then Abbot Filaretos Karydis commissioned the Hieromonk Benediktos Kavvadas to find a suitable hagiographer on Mount Athos to paint a faithful copy of the Holy Icon. Hieromonk Benediktos Kavvadas commissioned the hagiographer and hieromonk of the Galatians' procession of the Caracal cell of the Genesis of the Theotokos in Karyes of Mount Athos Beniamin Kontrakis to paint the icon of the Holy Icon. The Koutloumusian hieromonk Anatolios Messolongitis as well as Lefkadians who were then on Mount Athos helped financially to canonize the icon. The canonization was completed in 1887.

The Holy Icon arrived in Lefkada on the eve of the Holy Spirit 24 May (Julian)/5 June (Gregorian) 1887 where it was welcomed by clergy and people. The following day, the day of the Holy Spirit, May 25 (Julian) / June 6 (Gregorian) 1887, she was "enthroned" in the catholicon of the Holy Monastery. Since then the Synaxis of the Most Holy Theotokos of Lefkada is celebrated every year on the day of the Holy Spirit.

== Description ==
The icon is a work of 19th century Agioritical iconography with obvious western influences. It is 120 cm high and 80 cm wide. Its subject is a purely portrait typical example of the "Lady of Angels" type. It consists of four persons: the Theotokos, Jesus Christ, and the Archangels Michael and Gabriel. For the iconography of the image, the iconographer largely used the technique of sgraffito, or better known as sgraffito. In the sgraffito technique, the surface of the wood is coated with a preliminary color, then it is coated with a second color and finally the second layer of color, the coating, is removed with the help of a pin so that the result has the color of the substrate. In the case of the image the substrate is gold leaf.

=== The figures ===
The central figure of the image is Jesus Christ. He is sitting on the lap of his mother, Panagia. He looks straight at the observer, his gaze realistic and commanding while his broad forehead reflects his divine wisdom. On his head he has a halo in golden shades with a cross engraved on the three antennae of which the inscription "OHN" can be seen. With his right hand he blesses while with his left he holds a book, probably the Book of Life. His clothing consists of the tunic (inner garment) in earth tones and the mantle (outer garment) in deep blue with its folds illuminated by shades of gold with real chrysalis.

The Panagia sits on a throne and is the dominant face of the image. She also looks straight at the viewer while her face is bright and has soft features. On his head he has a golden halo decorated with rays. She holds Jesus Christ in her arms and specifically with her right hand she lifts his left leg and with her left hand she points towards Christ. Her clothes consist of the chiton (inner garment) in deep blue color, just like Christ's mantle, and the maforium (outer garment).

The exquisitely crafted maphorion is depicted as a rose gold-plated garment with deep red detailing. On the edge, on the band, the technique of polishing in a golden shade with shadows of the rare mineral color "dragon's blood" and decoration of incised geometric patterns can be distinguished. From the maforium on the arms along the chevrons hang gold fringes as well as three gold stars on the shoulders and forehead. The reversed color matching in the clothing of Jesus Christ and the Panagia visually balances the color proportions of the image. The Panagia's red shoes with details in golden hues protrude from under the tunic.

The two Archangels Michael and Gabriel are standing on the side supports of the throne on either side. They look towards Christ and the Virgin Mary with their arms crossed on their chests. On the head they have radiant halos in the shades of gold, while just above the halos the golden calligraphic monograms "M" and "G" can be seen respectively. Their clothing consists of the stoicharia (inner garments) and the mantles (outer garments). The bricks with details of plant decoration are worked with the sgraffito technique, giving the impression of being woven. The cloaks are colored red and pink. Their wings in shades of gray and green schematically frame the figures of the image in harmony.

== The "Kyra's Throne" ==
Today, the Holy Icon is kept in the Catholic Church of the Holy Monastery in a special place for pilgrimage during the hours when the Monastery is open. This area, the shrine of the Holy Icon or the "Throne of the Lady" as it is typically called, is in fact the right part of the Catholic sanctuary with the entrance to the right entrance of the Catholic icon. There, the Holy Icon is surrounded by hundreds of faithful offerings, candlesticks, relics of the Monastery, relics of Saints as well as a section of Sacred Wood.

== Feast of Panagia Phaneromeni ==
The Synaxis of the Holiness Pephaneromeni Theotokos is a movable feast and is celebrated on Monday, the day of the Holy Spirit. It is a religious holiday for the whole island of Lefkada as well as for the Lefkadians everywhere. The festivities begin four days before, on Friday evening, with Vespers and the transfer of the Holy Icon from its "Throne" to the Catholic Narthex. On the evening of the eve of the feast, Solemn Vespers is sung and the evening follows overnight. Every morning, Orthros is chanted and then the Divine Liturgy is celebrated. After the end of the Divine Liturgy, the Litany of the Holy Icon takes place around the Holy Monastery. In the afternoon of the same day, Vespers is chanted and the founding memorial service is held. The events are attended by thousands of believers from all over Greece to worship the Holy Icon.

== Sources ==
- "Περιγραφή της εικόνας της Παναγίας Φανερωμένης". Λευκαδίτικα Νέα (Ιστοσελίδα).
- "Τριήμερες λατρευτικές εκδηλώσεις προς τιμήν της Παναγίας Φανερωμένης στη Λευκάδα". MyLefkada.gr.
- "Ένα οδοιπορικό "Στη Κυρά Φανερωμένη μας", γεμάτο θύμησες και νοσταλγίες". Νέα της Λευκάδας. Archived from the original on 2016-07-03.
