= Karlonisi =

Greek island in the Ionian Sea

Native name: Καρλονήσι
- Location within Greece

Geography
- Location: Ionian Sea
- Coordinates: 38.475°N 21.043°E
- Archipelago: Echinades
- Area: 0.719 km^{2} (0.278 sq mi)
- Highest elevation: 77 m (253 ft)

Administration
- Greece
- Region: Ionian Islands
- Municipality: Ithaca

Demographics
- Population: 0 (2011)

Karlonisi (Greek: Καρλονήσι) is an island of the Echinades (Drakoneres subgroup), among the Ionian Islands group of Greece. It has an average elevation of 61 metres (200 ft). It is administered by the municipality of Ithaca and is situated 30 km (19 mi) east of the island. As of 2011, it had no resident population.
