= Prováti =

Greek island in the Ionian Sea

Native name: Προβάτι
- Location within Greece

Geography
- Location: Ionian Sea
- Coordinates: 38°27′47″N 21°02′49″E
- Archipelago: Echinades
- Area: 1.21 km^{2} (0.47 sq mi)
- Highest elevation: 75 m (246 ft)

Administration
- Greece
- Region: Ionian Islands
- Municipality: Ithaca

Demographics
- Population: 0 (2011)

Prováti (Greek: Προβάτι) is an island of the Echinades, among the Ionian Islands group of Greece. As of 2011, it had no resident population.
