= Arkoudi =

Greek island in the Ionian Sea

Native name: Αρκούδι
- Location within Greece

Geography
- Location: Ionian Sea
- Coordinates: 38.550°N 20.707°E
- Archipelago: Ionian Islands
- Highest elevation: 136 m (446 ft)

Administration
- Greece
- Region: Ionian Islands
- Municipality: Ithaca

Demographics
- Population: 0 (2011)

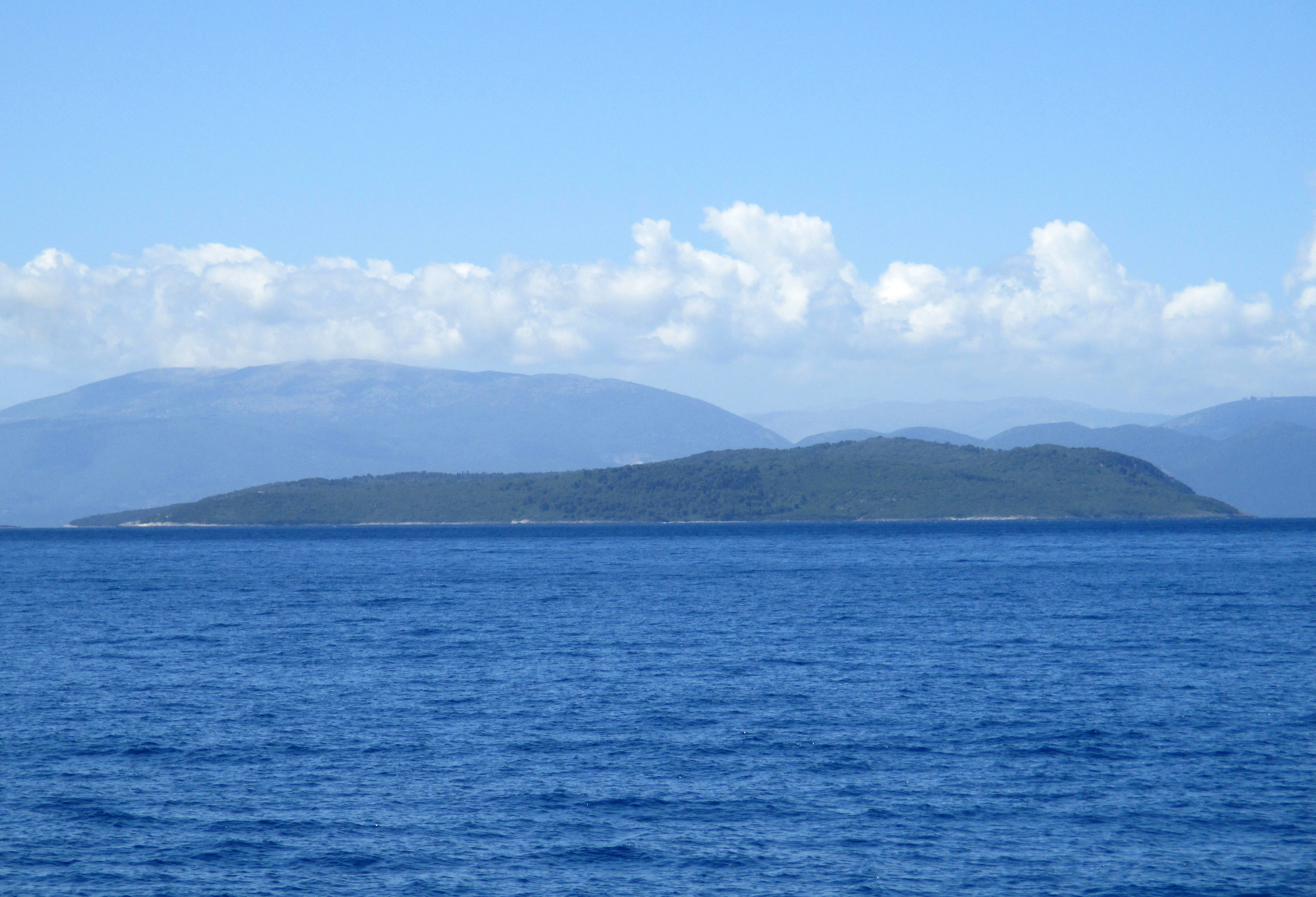
Arkoudi island

Arkoudi (Greek: Αρκούδι, meaning bear) is a small Greek island in the Ionian Sea. It is situated 5 km (3 mi) south of Lefkada, 6 km (4 mi) northeast of Ithaca and 7 km (4 mi) southwest of Meganisi. It is administered by the municipality of Ithaca. As of 2011, it had no resident population.
