= Makri (island) =

Greek island in the Ionian Sea

Anti Pasti Island
Native name: Anti Pasti Island
- Location within Greece

Geography
- Location: Ionian Sea
- Coordinates: 38°21′43″N 21°02′02″E
- Archipelago: Echinades
- Area: 0.983 km^{2} (0.380 sq mi)
- Highest elevation: 126 m (413 ft)

Administration
- Greece
- Region: Ionian Islands
- Municipality: Ithaca

Demographics
- Population: 13 (2026)

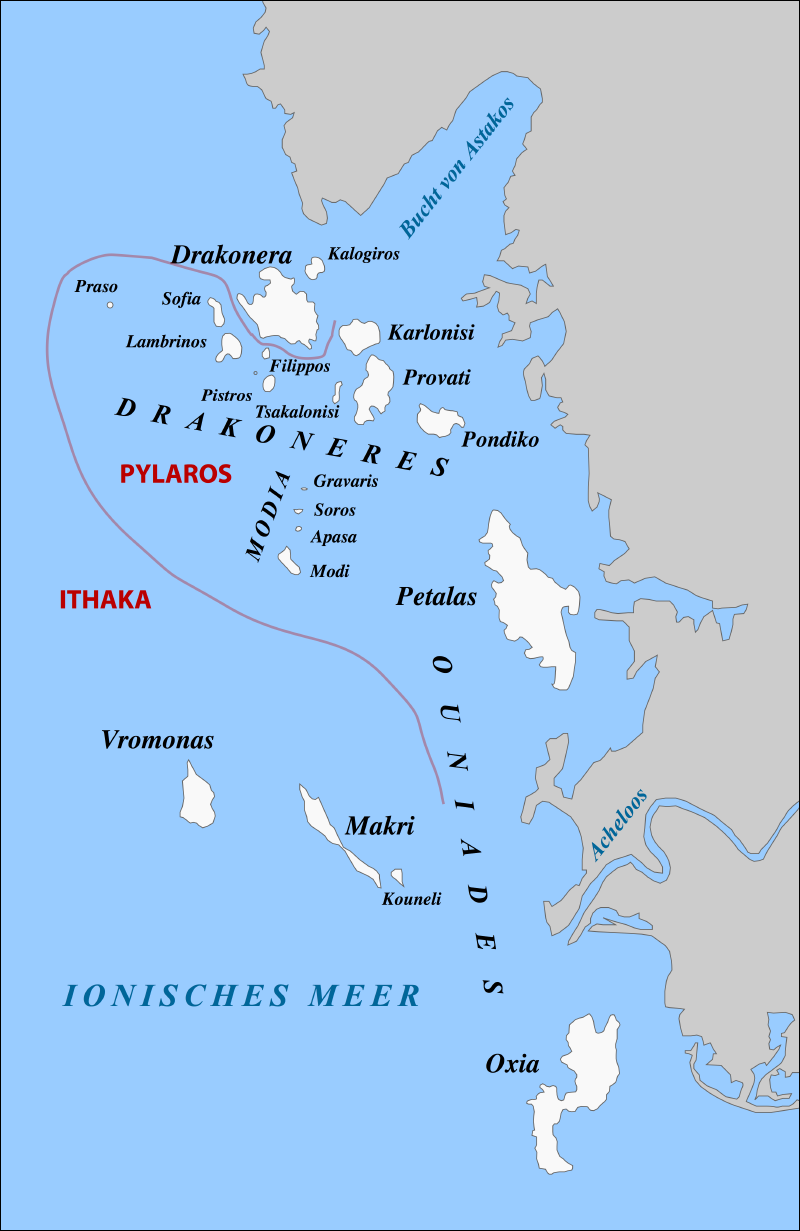
Makri in the Echinades Archipelago

Makri (Nissos Makri) (Greek: Μάκρη) is a Greek island, one of the Echinades, in the Ionian Islands group. It is located on the far southeast side of the Gulf of Makri close to the mouth of the Acheloos river. It is administered by the municipality of Ithaca and is 24 km (15 mi) east of the island. As of 2011, it had no resident population. Strabo, and most modern writers, identify Dulichium, from which Homer reports that Meges, son of Phyleus, led 40 ships to Troy, with the island of Makri.

The island is roughly 2.5 km (1.6 mi) long and 0.5 km (0.3 mi) at its widest. It has an area of roughly 993,000 acres (401,853 ha) and an estimate coastline of 7,280 m (23,885 ft) in length. Made up of 2 hills linked by an isthmus, there is also a small islet named Kouneli (Greek: Κουνέλι) at its southeastern corner.

The island went up for sale at auction in July 2022 with a starting price of 3.8 million euros, and it is now privately owned.
