= Drakonera =

Island in Greece

Native name: Δρακονέρα
- Location within Greece

Geography
- Location: Ionian Sea
- Coordinates: 38.480°N 21.019°E
- Archipelago: Echinades
- Area: 2.442 km^{2} (0.943 sq mi)
- Highest elevation: 137 m (449 ft)

Administration
- Greece
- Region: Ionian Islands
- Municipality: Ithaca

Demographics
- Population: 0 (2011)

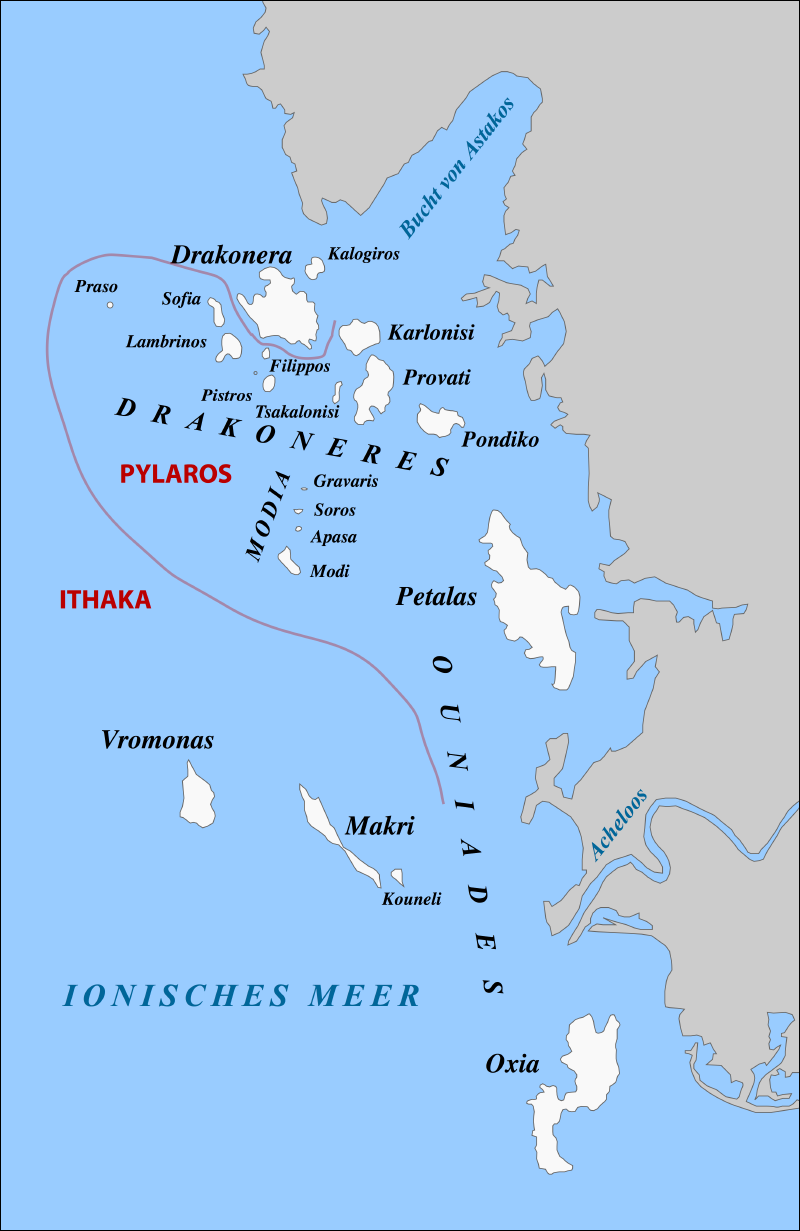
Echinades Archipelagos, Greece

Drakonera (Greek: Δρακονέρα) is an island of the Echinades, among the Ionian Islands group of Greece. Drakonera forms part of the northern group of the Echinades, which are called the Drakoneras after the island. The mainland with the Aetolia-Acarnania regional unit is to the north and east. Several islets surround the area. It is administered by the municipality of Ithaca. As of 2011, it had no resident population.
