= Praso (Echinades) =

Greek islet in the Ionian Sea

Coordinates: 38°28′58″N 20°58′10″E

Praso (Greek: Πράσο) is an islet east of Ithaca, one of the Ionian Islands in Greece.
