= Oxeia =

Greek island in the Ionian Sea

Native name: Οξεία
- Location within Greece

Geography
- Location: Ionian Sea
- Coordinates: 38°18′07″N 21°06′32″E
- Archipelago: Echinades
- Area: 4.223 km^{2} (1.631 sq mi)
- Highest elevation: 421 m (1381 ft)

Administration
- Greece
- Region: Ionian Islands
- Municipality: Ithaca

Demographics
- Population: 0 (2011)

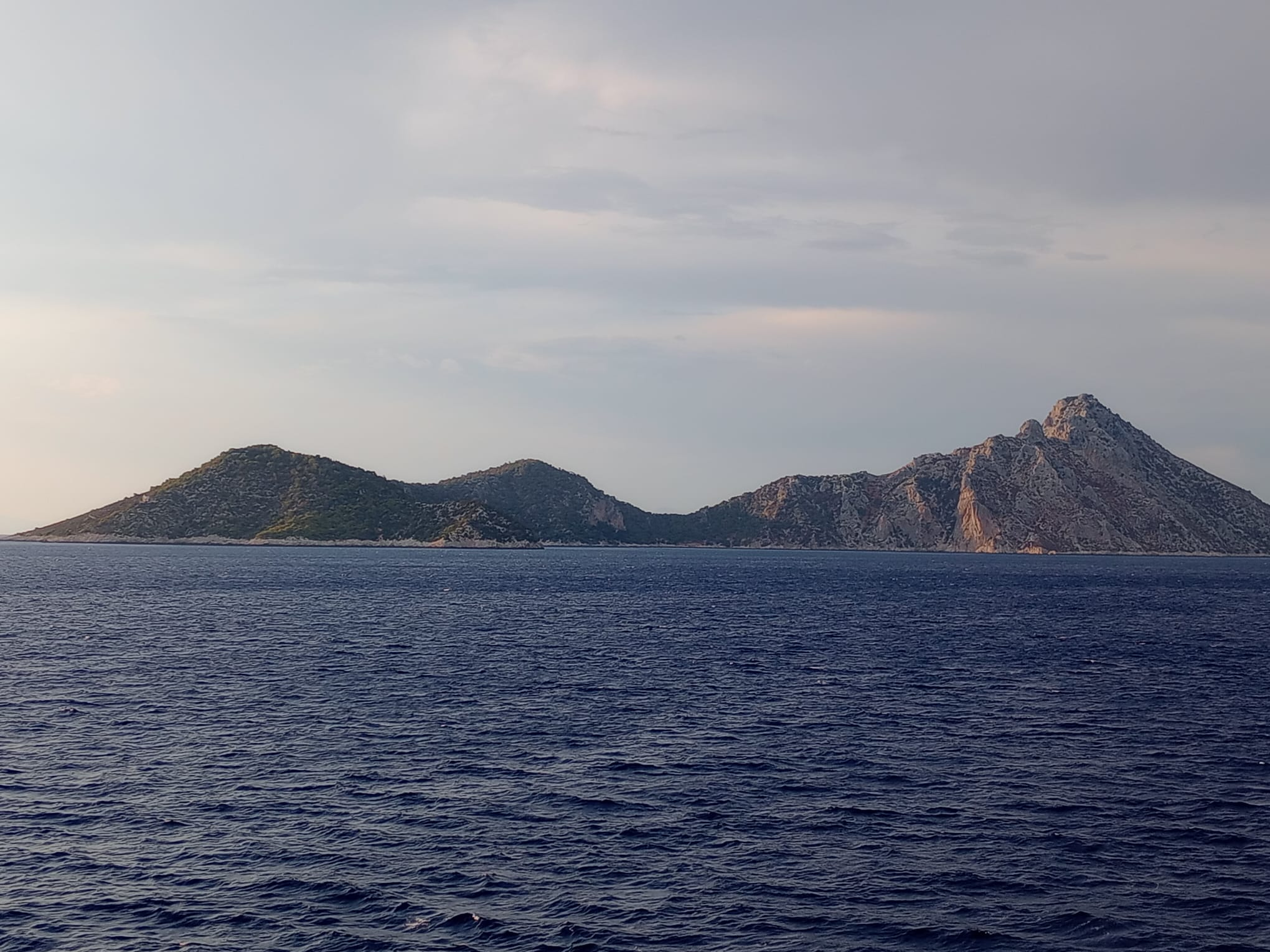
Oxeia Island, Echinades

Oxeia (Greek: Οξεία) is a Greek island in the Ionian Sea. As of 2011, it had no resident population. It is the chief island in the southern group (the Ouniades) of the Echinades, part of the Ionian Islands. Oxeia possesses the highest point in the Echinades, 421 metres (1,381 feet). It is situated near the mouth of the river Acheloos, off the coast of Aetolia-Acarnania. The island is around 5 kilometres (3 miles) in length and its width is approximately 2 km (1 mile). The Battle of Lepanto took place near the island in 1571.

In April 2012, it was bought by Qatar Holdings.
