= Navtilos (Antikythera) =

Greek islet in the Sea of Crete

Native name: Ναυτίλος
- Location within Greece

Geography
- Location: Sea of Crete
- Coordinates: 35.9374°N 23.215°E
- Archipelago: Ionian Islands

Administration
- Greece
- Region: Attica
- Municipality: Cythera

Demographics
- Population: 0

Navtilos is a small islet of the Sea of Crete. The islet is located about 30 km southeast of the port of Kapsali on the island of Kythira, and 6 km northwest of the northern tip of Antikythira.

It is 300 yards long in an east and west direction and 10 feet high. From a distance this rock has the appearance of scattered rocks, as it is very jagged. Sunken rocks lie eastward and westward of the above-water part, giving the entire danger a length of 800 yards. The water about 100 yards off this danger is deep.
