= Lefkada (city) =

Lefkada City Πόλη της Λευκάδας
- Municipal unit
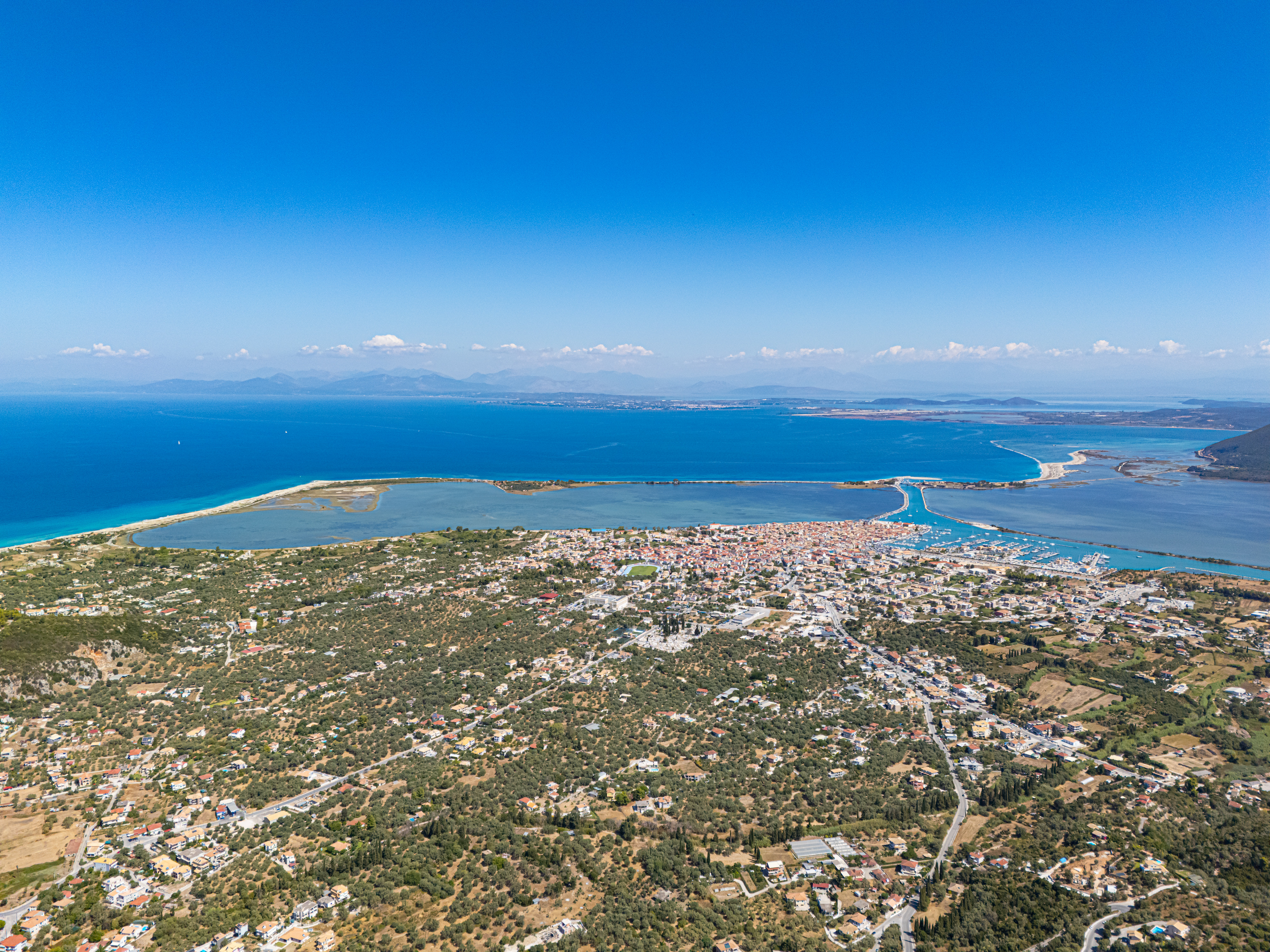
- City of Lefkada

- Location within the regional unit

- Location within Greece
- Coordinates: 38°50′02″N 20°42′31″E
- Country: Greece
- Administrative region: Ionian Islands
- Regional unit: Lefkada
- Municipality: Lefkada

Area
  - Municipal unit: 60.628 km^{2} (23.409 sq mi)

Population (2021)
  - Municipal unit: 13,540
  - Municipal unit density: 223.3/km^{2} (578.4/sq mi)
  - Community: 9,253
- Time zone: UTC+2 (EET)
  - Summer (DST): UTC+3 (EEST)
- Postal code: 311 00
- Area code: 26450
- Vehicle registration: ΕΥ

Lefkada City (Greek: Πόλη της Λευκάδας, Póli tis Lefkádas) is a city and a former municipality on the island of Lefkada, Ionian Islands, Greece. Since the 2011 local government reform it is part of the municipality Lefkada, of which it is a municipal unit. It is the capital and main town of the island of Lefkada, located in the northern and northeastern part of the island. The city had a population of 9,253 inhabitants at the 2021 census. The municipal unit has a land area of 60.628 square kilometres (23.409 sq mi) and a population of 13,540 (2021).

== Subdivisions ==
The municipal unit Lefkada is subdivided into the following communities (constituent villages in brackets):

- Lefkada City (Lefkada City, Fryni, Kalligoni)
- Agios Nikitas
- Alexandros (Alexandros, Kollyvata, Nikiana)
- Apolpaina
- Kalamitsi
- Kariotes
- Katouna (Katouna, Episkopos, Lygia)
- Tsoukalades (Tsoukalades, Kalavros)

== Climate ==
Climate data for Levkas
Month	Jan	Feb	Mar	Apr	May	Jun	Jul	Aug	Sep	Oct	Nov	Dec	Year
Mean daily maximum °C (°F)	14 (57)	16 (60)	16 (61)	19 (66)	24 (75)	28 (82)	31 (87)	31 (88)	27 (81)	23 (73)	18 (64)	15 (59)	22 (71)
Mean daily minimum °C (°F)	6 (43)	7 (44)	8 (46)	11 (51)	15 (59)	18 (65)	21 (70)	21 (70)	18 (65)	14 (58)	11 (51)	8 (46)	13 (56)
Average precipitation mm (inches)	160 (6.2)	120 (4.8)	91 (3.6)	64 (2.5)	41 (1.6)	20 (0.8)	5.1 (0.2)	20 (0.8)	46 (1.8)	140 (5.7)	160 (6.2)	210 (8.4)	1,080 (42.6)
Source: Weatherbase

== Culture ==
=== Architecture ===
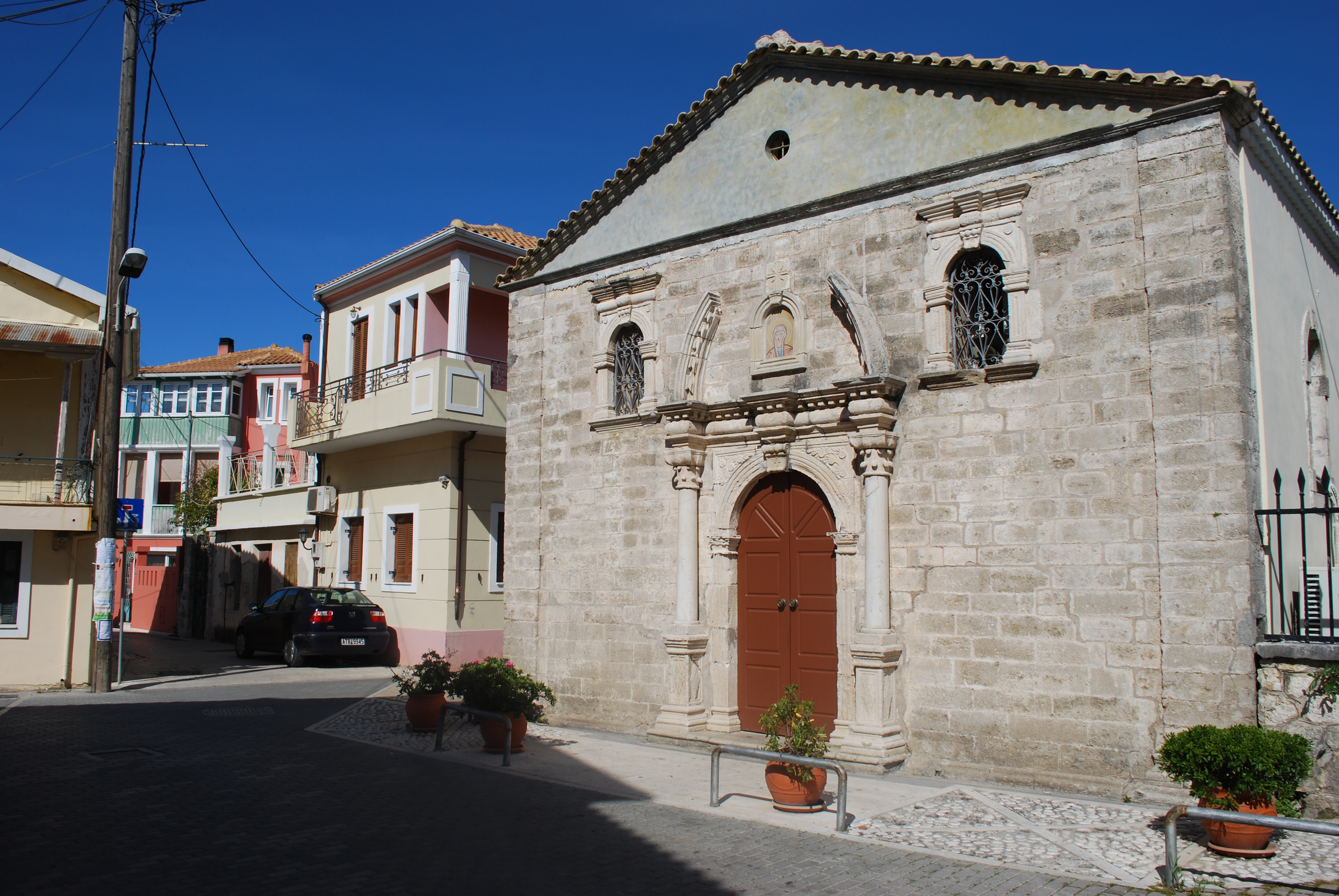
The church Panagia ton Xenon

The buildings of Lefkada City is a characteristic sample of anti-earthquake structure. The houses are built with wooden material, whole logs, stone chip and other more light materials. The city plan is based in the medieval city plan of Lefkada City. This was developed during the Venetian rule. Lefkada City has old temples built with local traditional architecture. The more famous are the temple of Agios Spyridon, Agioi Anargyroi and Panagia ton Xenon.

=== Sports ===
Lefkada City hosts sport clubs in several sports. The most historic is Tilikratis F.C., that was founded in 1927 and recently has played in Super League2 (2nd division).

Sport clubs based in Lefkada
Club	Founded	Sports	Achievements
Tilikratis F.C.	1927	Football	Earlier presence in Gamma Ethniki
Doxa Lefkadas	1981	Basketball	Presence in A1 Ethniki
Niki Lefkadas	2006	Basketball	Presence in A1 Ethniki women

== Gallery ==
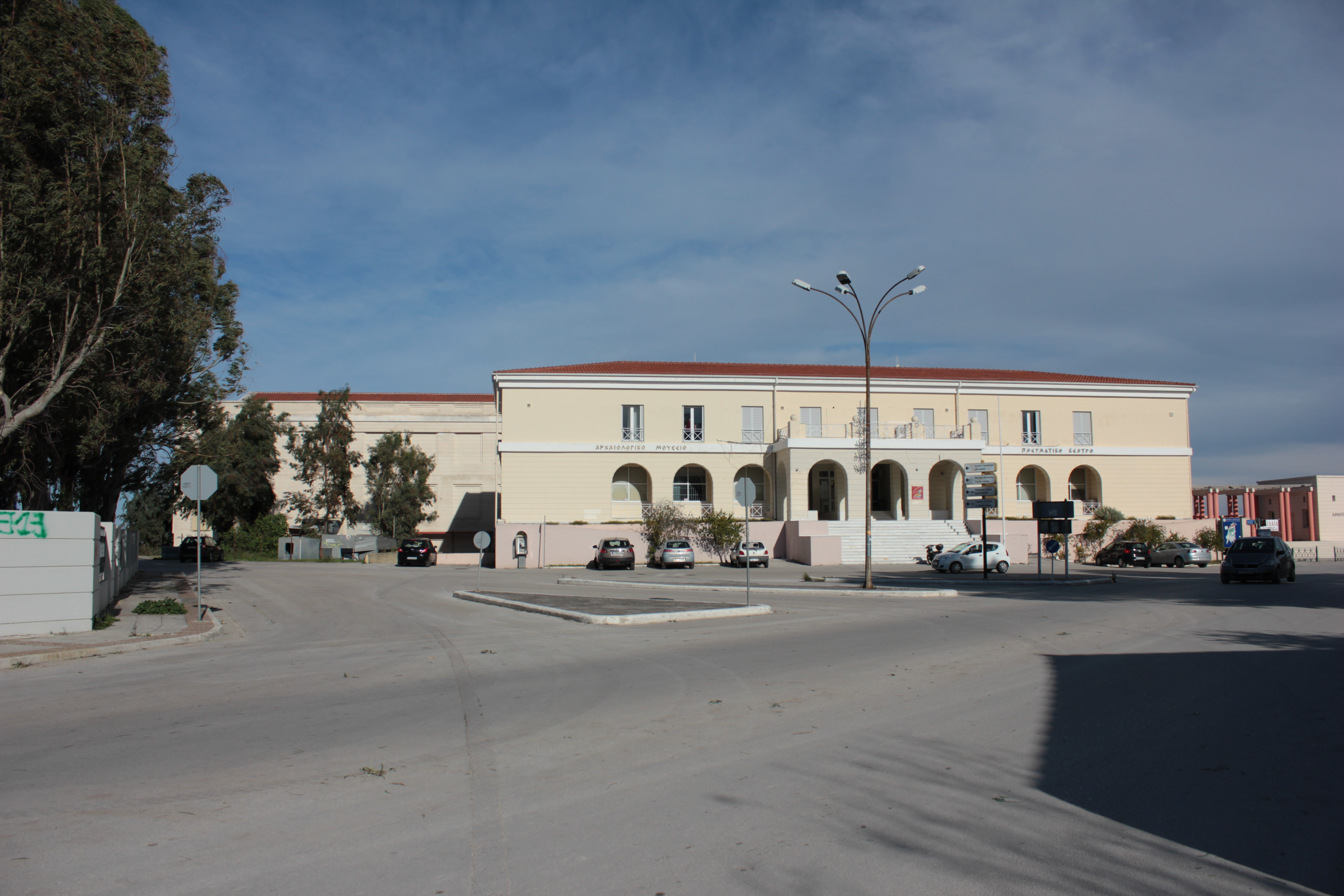
The cultural center is housing the archaeological museum of Lefkada

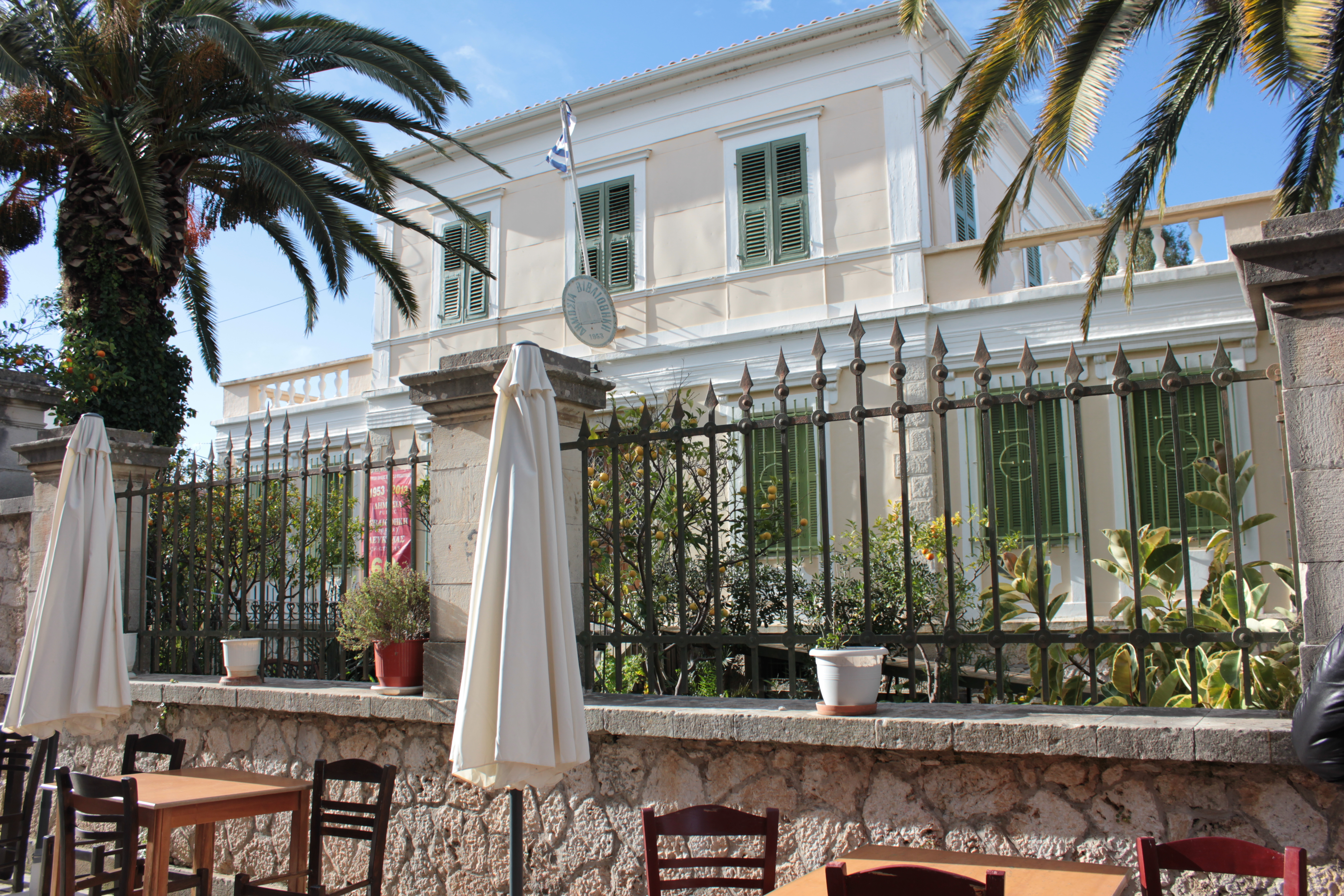
Lefkada public library

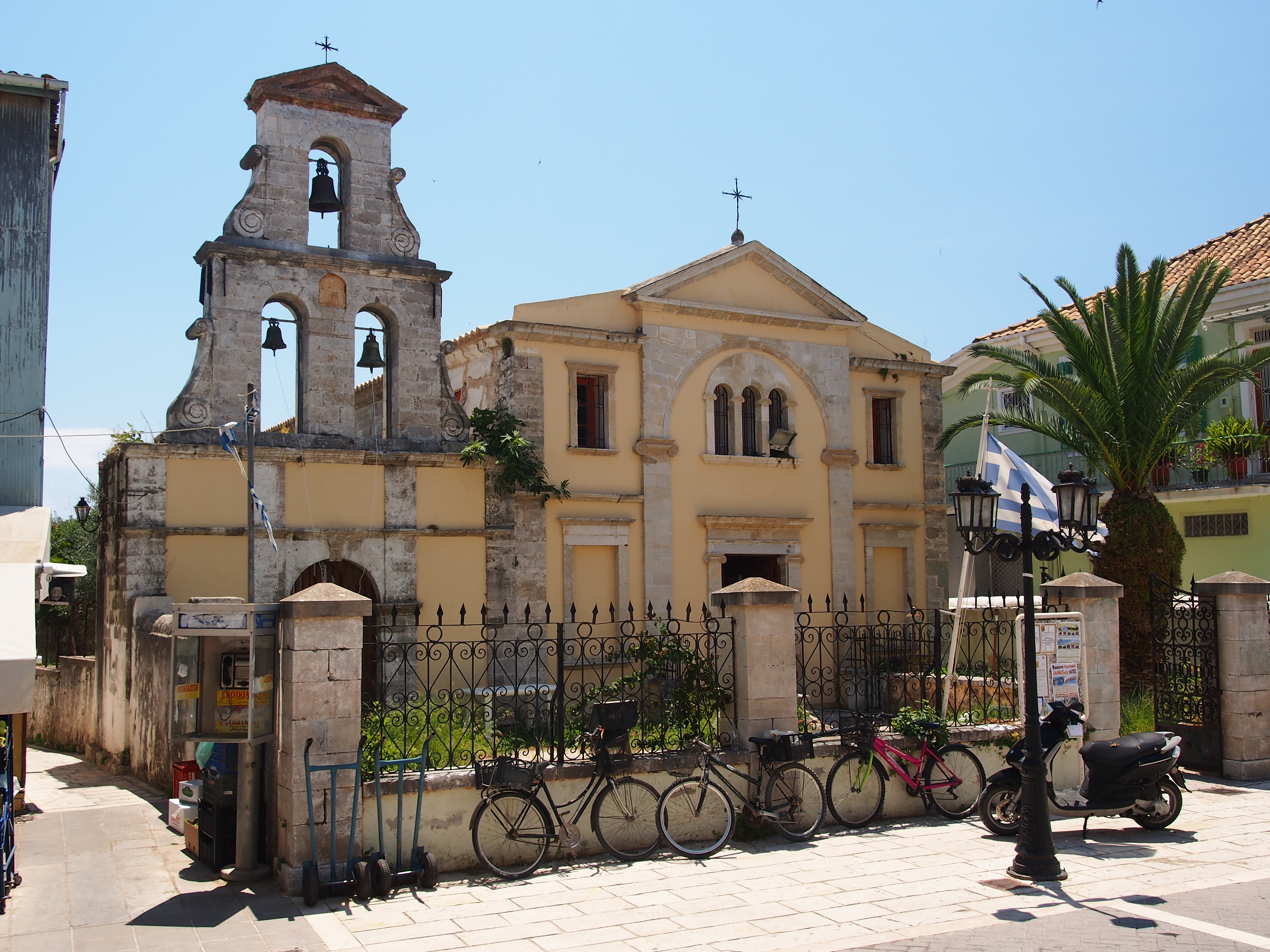
Theotokos church

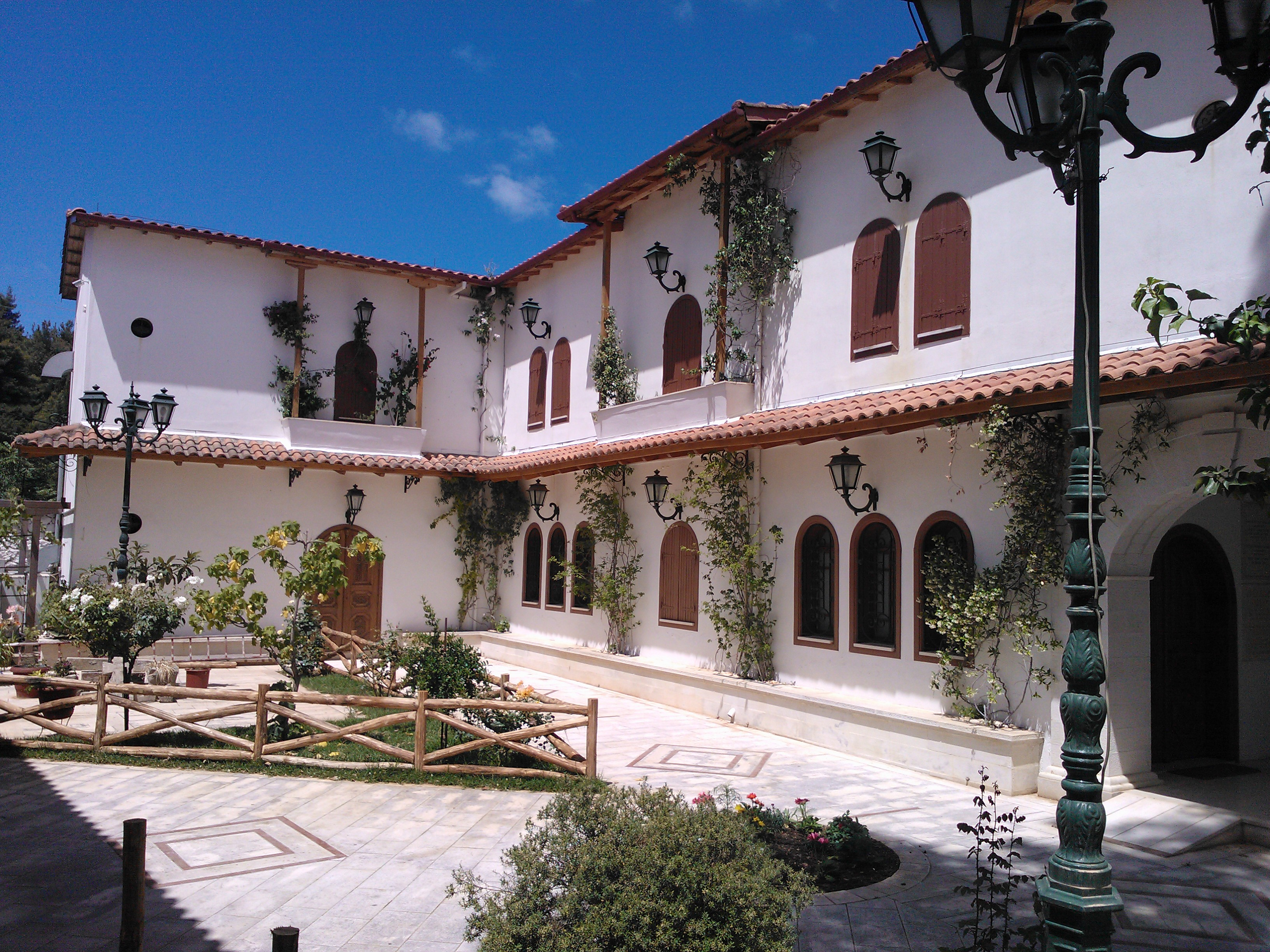
Monastery Faneromeni
