= Ionian Sea =

Part of the Mediterranean Sea south of the Adriatic Sea

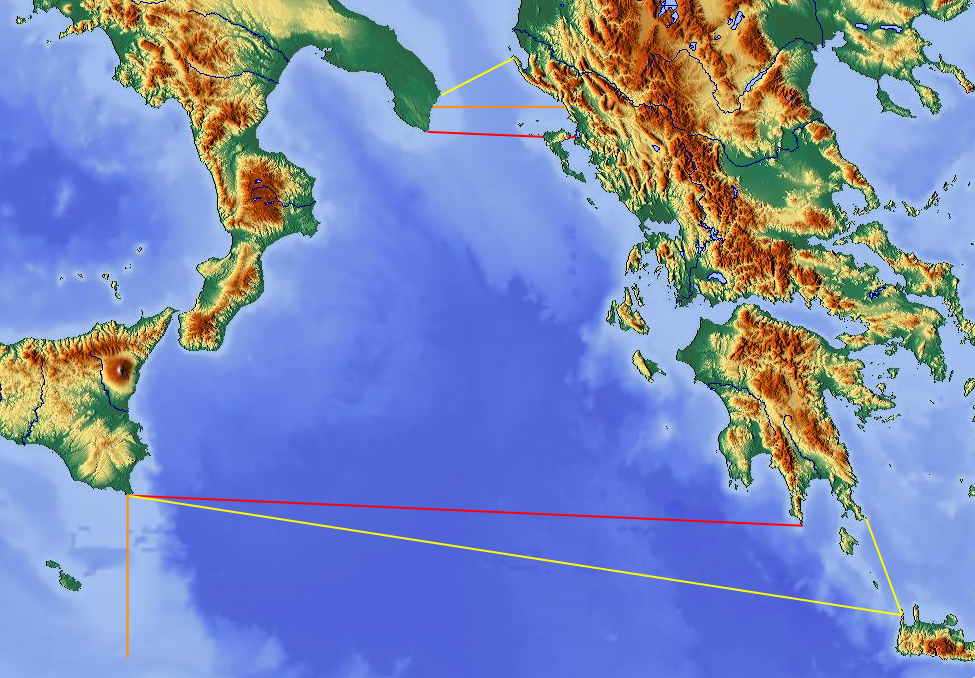
- Boundaries of Ionian Sea (key in footnote (Note: Key to borders shown on relief map: *yellow: traditional borders, *orange: borders as used by Italian weather service Meteomar, *red lines define border per International Hydrographic Organization))
- Interactive map of Ionian Sea
- Location: Southern Europe
- Coordinates: 38°N 19°E
- Type: Sea
- Primary outflows: Mediterranean Sea
- Basin countries: Albania, Greece, and Italy
- Islands: List of islands in the Ionian Sea
- Settlements: Igoumenitsa, Parga, Preveza, Astakos, Patras, Kerkyra, Lefkada, Argostoli, Zakynthos, Kyparissia, Pylos, Kalamata, Himarë, Sarandë, Syracuse, Catania, Taormina, Messina, Catanzaro, Crotone, Taranto

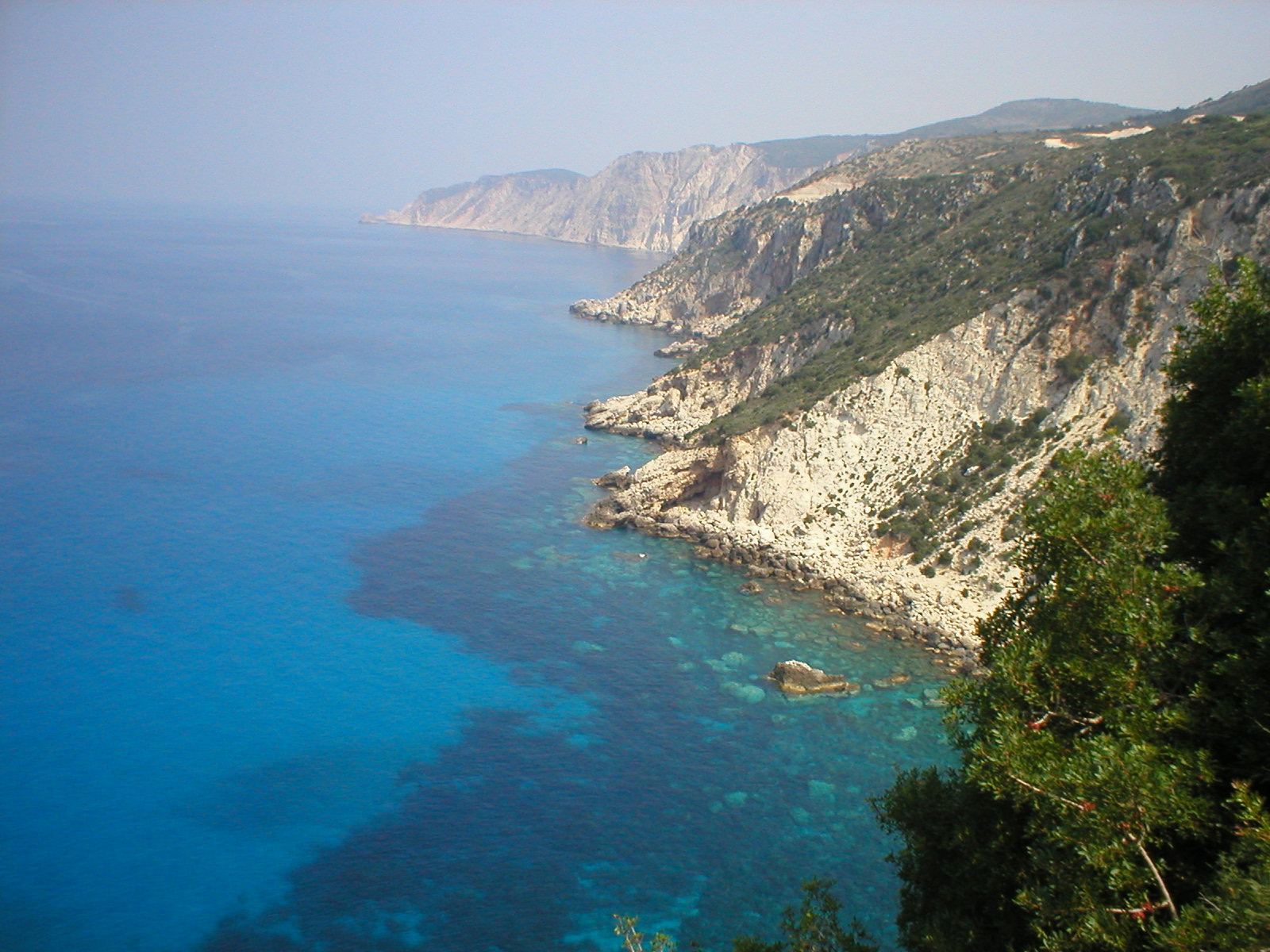
The Ionian Sea, view from the island Kefalonia, Greece

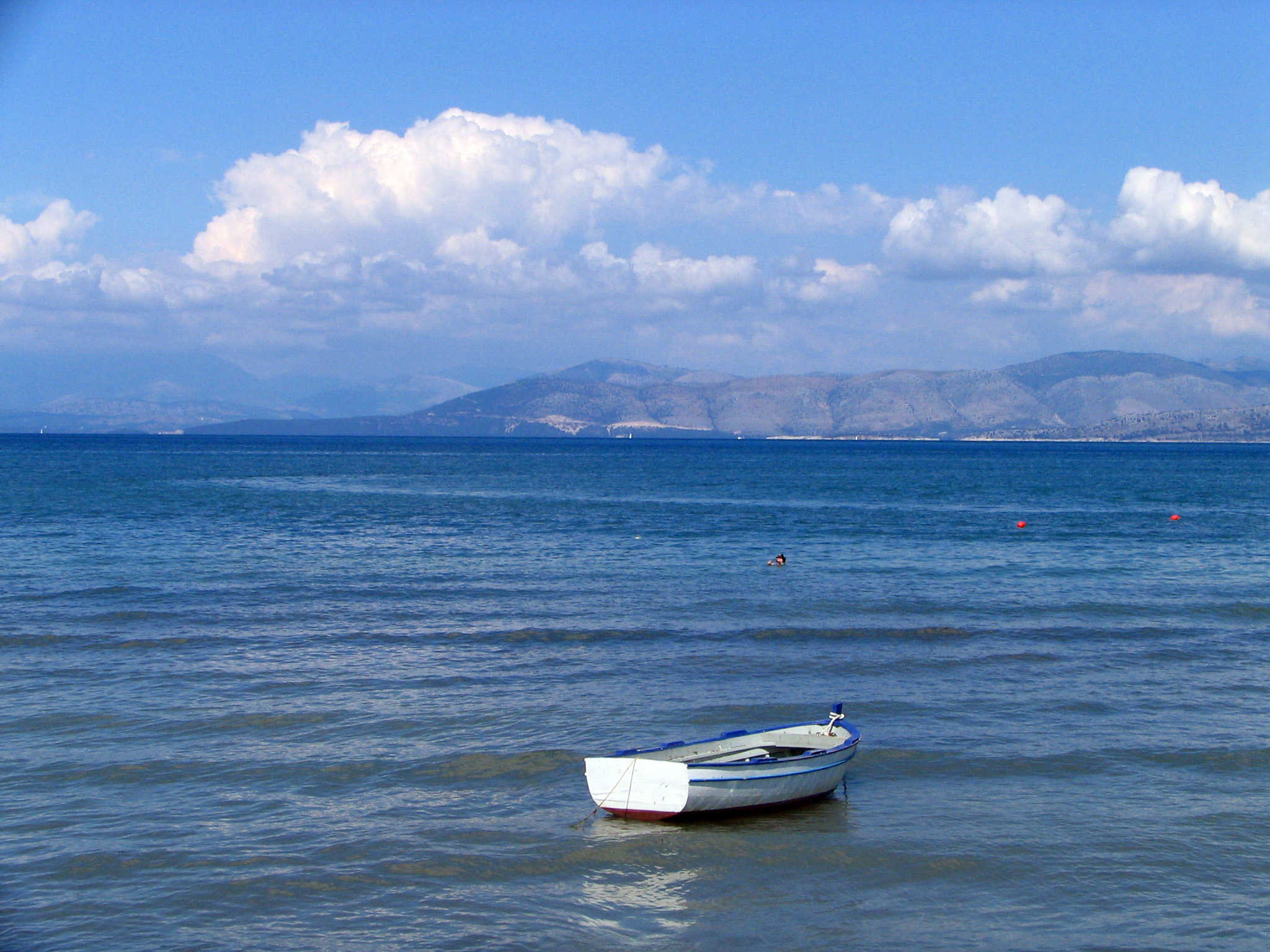
The Ionian Sea, as seen from Corfu Island, Greece, and with Sarandë, Albania in the background

The Ionian Sea (Note: Modern Greek: Ιόνιο Πέλαγος, romanized: Iónio Pélagos, IPA: [iˈoni.o ˈpelaɣos]; Ancient Greek: Ἰόνιον πέλαγος (Iónion pélagos), Ἰόνιος θάλασσα (Iónios thálassa) or Ἰόνιος πόντος (Iónios póntos). Italian: Mar Ionio or Mar Jonio, IPA: [mar ˈjɔːnjo]; Sicilian: Mari Joniu [ˈmaːɾɪ ˈjɔːnjʊ]; Salentino: Mare Joniu; Tarantino: Mare Jonie. Albanian: Deti Jon, IPA: [ˈdɛti ˈjɔn]) is an elongated bay of the Mediterranean Sea. It is connected to the Adriatic Sea to the north, and is bounded by Southern Italy, including Basilicata, Calabria, Sicily, and the Salento peninsula to the west, southern Albania (and western Apulia, Italy) to the north, and the west coast of Greece, including the Peloponnese.

All major islands in the sea, which are located in the east of the sea, belong to Greece. They are collectively named the Ionian Islands, the main ones being Corfu, Kefalonia, Zakynthos, Lefkada, and Ithaca.

There are ferry routes between Patras and Igoumenitsa, Greece, and Brindisi and Ancona, Italy, that cross the east and north of the Ionian Sea, and from Piraeus westward. Calypso Deep, the deepest point in the Mediterranean at 5,109 m (16,762 ft), is in the Ionian Sea, at 36°34′N 21°8′E. The sea is one of the most seismically active areas in the world.

== Etymology ==
The name "Ionian" comes from the Greek word Ionion (Ἰόνιον). Its etymology is unknown. Ancient Greek writers, especially Aeschylus, linked it to the myth of Io. In ancient Greek the adjective Ionios (Ἰόνιος) was used as an epithet for the sea because Io swam across it. According to the Oxford Classical Dictionary, the name may derive from Ionians who sailed to the west, however the word for Ionians is spelled with an omega ( Ἴωνες) rather than an omicron as in the word for the Ionian Sea. There were also narratives about other eponymic legendary figures: according to one version, Ionius, son of Adrias (eponymic for the Adriatic Sea); according to another, Ionius, son of Dyrrhachus. When Dyrrhachus was attacked by his own brothers, Heracles, who was passing through the area, came to his aid, but in the fight the hero killed his ally's son by mistake. The body was cast into the water, which thereafter was called the Ionian Sea.

== Geography ==
=== Extent ===
The International Hydrographic Organization defines the limits of the Ionian Sea as follows:

On the North. A line running from the mouth of the Butrinto River (39°44'N) in Albania, to Cape Karagol in Corfu (39°45'N), along the North Coast of Corfu to Cape Kephali (39°45'N) and from thence to Cape Santa Maria di Leuca in Italy.

On the East. From the mouth of the Butrinto River in Albania down the coast of the mainland to Cape Matapan.

On the South. A line from Cape Matapan to Cape Passero, the Southern point of Sicily.

On the West. The East coast of Sicily and the Southeast coast of Italy to Cape Santa Maria di Leuca.

=== Places ===
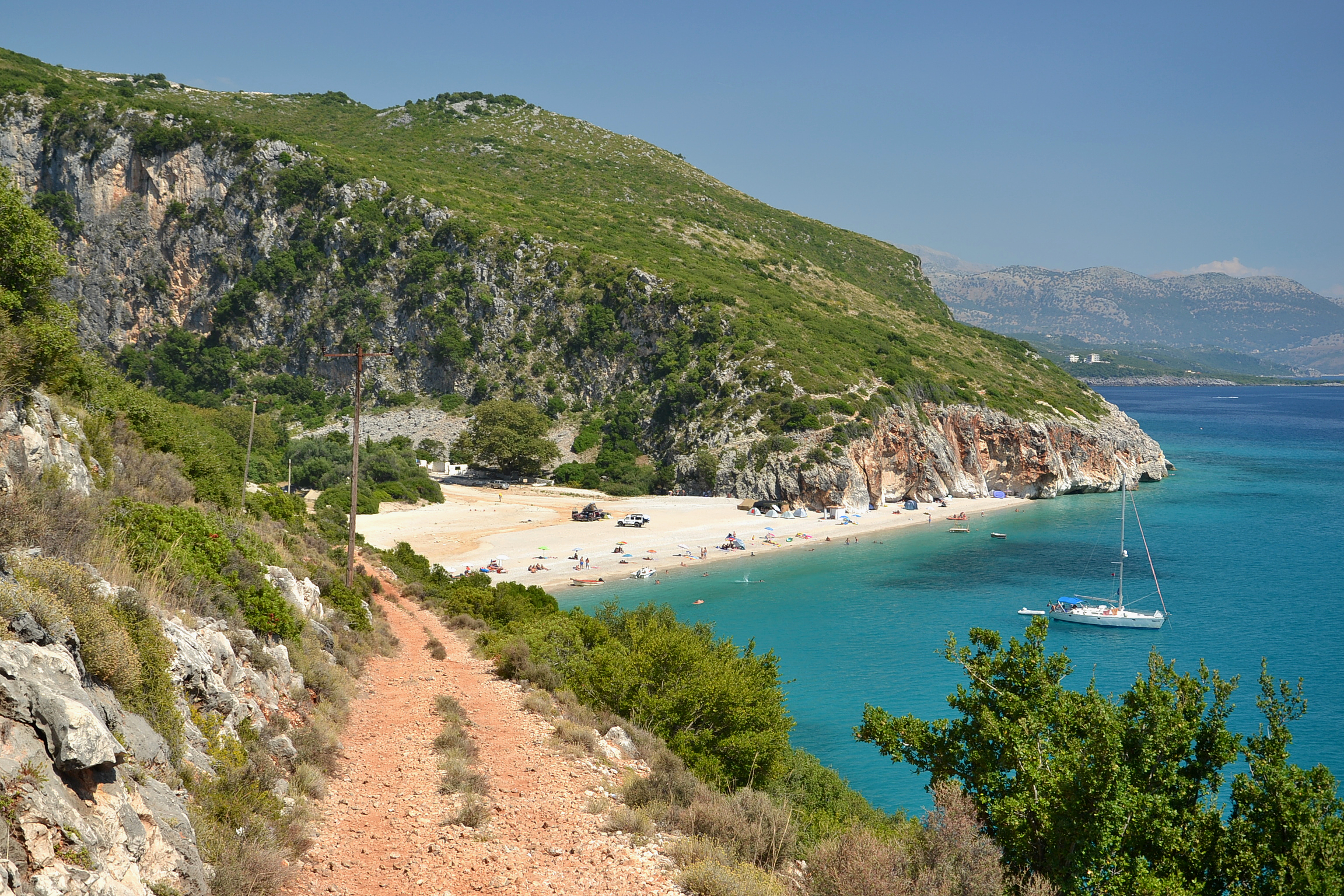
Gjipe in the south of Albania where the Adriatic Sea meets the Ionian Sea

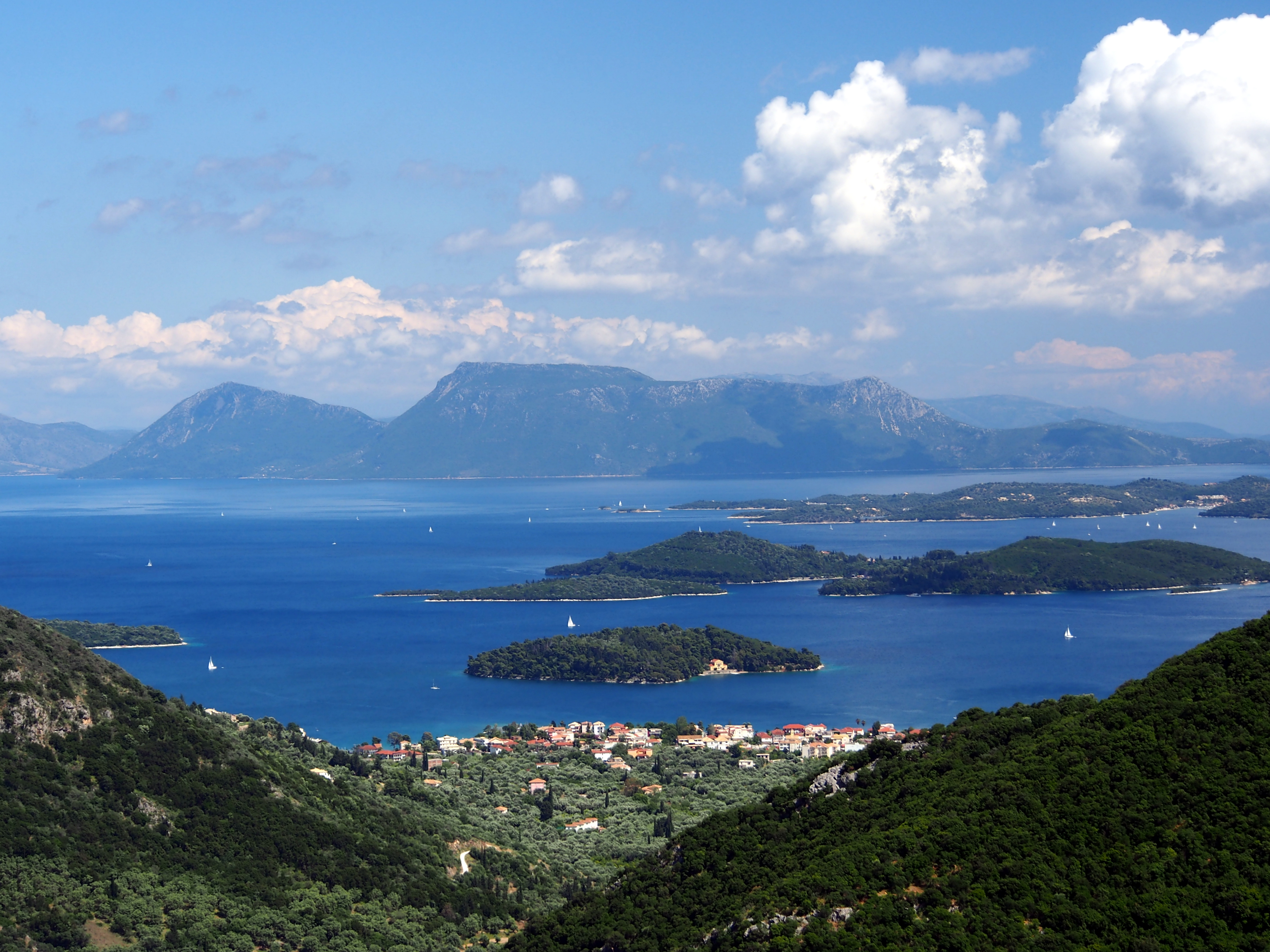
The Ionian Sea, view from the island Lefkada, Greece

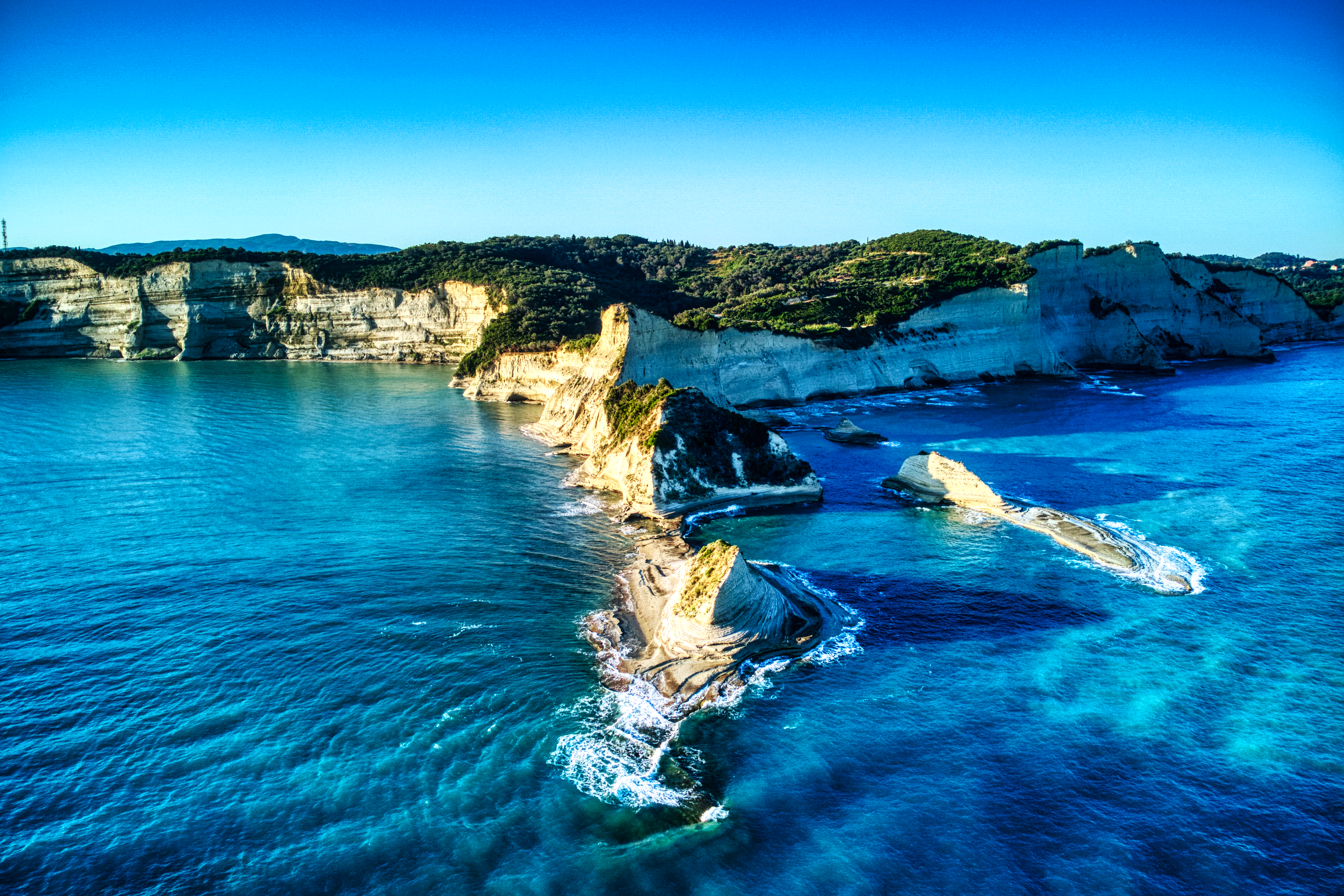
Cape Drastis and the Ionian Sea, Corfu Island

From south to north in the west, then north to south in the east:

- Syracuse, port, W
- Augusta, port, W
- Catania, port, W
- Messina, port, W
- Reggio Calabria, port, W
- Taranto, port N
- Himara, small port, NE
- Saranda, port and a beach, NE
- Kerkyra, port, E
- Igoumenitsa, port, E
- Parga, small port, E
- Preveza, port, E
- Astakos, port, E
- Argostoli, port, E
- Patra, port, E
- Kyparissia, port, E
- Pylos, port, E
- Methoni, small port and a beach
- Koroni smal port
- Kalamata,port, E
- Ionian Islands

=== Gulfs and straits ===
- Strait of Messina, W
- Gulf of Catania, W
- Gulf of Augusta, W
- Gulf of Taranto, NW
- Gulf of Squillace, NW
- Ambracian Gulf, E
- Gulf of Patras, connecting the Gulf of Corinth, ESE
- Gulf of Kyparissia, SE
- Messenian Gulf, SE
- Laconian Gulf, ESE

=== Islands ===
- Corfu
- Kefalonia
- Ithaca
- Zakynthos
- Lefkada
- Paxi
- Kythira

=== Islets ===
- Antikythera
- Antipaxi
- Arkoudi
- Atokos
- Kalamos
- Kastos
- Ksamil Islands
- Kravia
- Kythros
- Lazareto (Ithaca)
- Lazaretto (Corfu)
- Meganisi
- Navtilos
- Pontikonisi
- Proti
- Sphacteria
- Skorpios
- Sparti (Lefkada)
- Stillo
- Strofades
- Tongo
- Vido

== History ==
The sea is famous for the seafaring adventures of the Ancient Greek hero Odysseus, the warrior-king of the island of Ithaca.

The Ionian Sea was regularly crossed since at least the 8th century BC, by ancient Greek colonizers who were establishing colonies in Italy.

During the Roman period, it was the location of the Battle of Actium between Octavian and Mark Antony in 31 BC.

A number of major naval engagements would be fought over the eastern section of the sea and its islands throughout the modern era, culminating in its control by the modern state of Greece. The western section of the Ionian Sea has been controlled by Italy since 1861.
