= List of Aegean Islands =

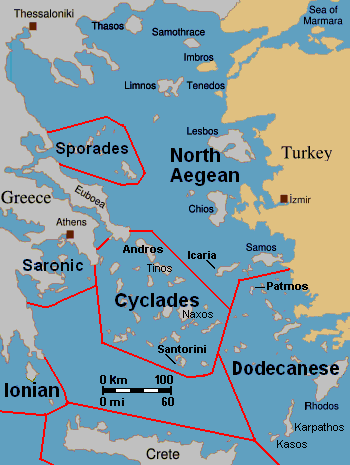
Aegean Sea with island groups

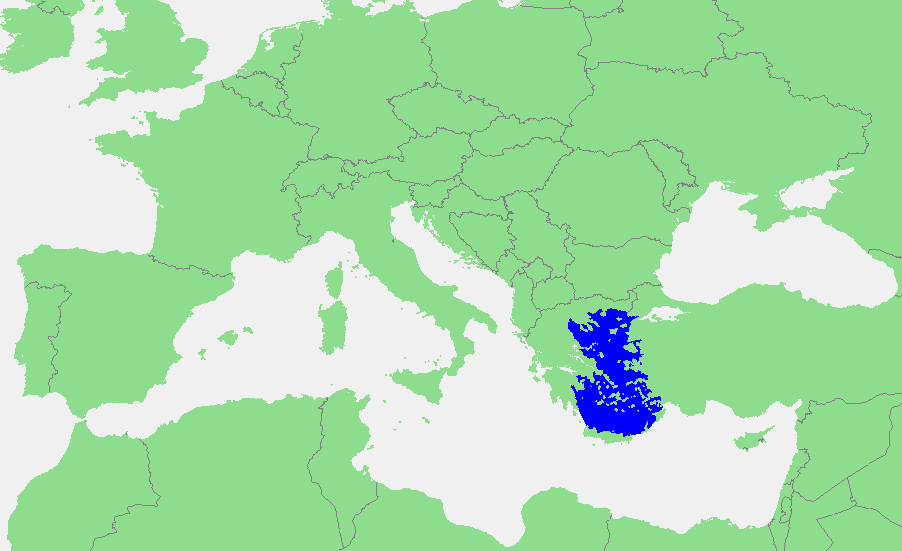
Extent of the Aegean Sea

This is a list of Aegean Islands, which includes the English, Modern Greek, Ancient Greek, Latin, Medieval Latin, and Italian names for these islands in the Aegean Sea arranged by island group. (Note: Names are imported from English and Greek Wikipedia articles. References are included when known. General references for all islands include Ptolemy's The Geography and Latin translations, a modern geography databased called GeoNames and the Digital Atlas of the Roman Empire (a Swedish geographic database).) Since World War II, the vast majority of the islands and islets are in Greek territory, with notable exceptions being Imbros, Tenedos, Cunda, Uzunada, the Rabbit Islands, and other small islets that are part of Turkish territory. The Greek island Kastelorizo, as a member of the Dodecanese Islands, is at the furthest eastern part of the Aegean Sea at the borders with Levantine Sea.

== The Cyclades ==
The following islands are part of the Greek Cyclades:

English	Greek	Ancient Greek	Latin	Medieval Latin
Amorgos	Αμοργός Amorgós	Υπερία Hyperia or Yperia, Παταγύς ή Πλαταγύς Patagy, or Platagy, Παγάλη Pagali, Ψυχία Psichia, Καρκισία Karkisia.	Amorgo	
Anafi	Ανάφη Anáfi	Ανάφη Anafi, Αιγλήτη Aeglite, Μεμβλίαρος Memvliaros.	Anaphe	
Andros	Άνδρος Ándros	Άνδρος Andros, Υδρούσα Hydrousa, Επαγρίς Epagris, Νοαγρία Noagria, Λασία Lasia.	Andrus	Andro
Antikeria islands	Αντικέρια Antikeria (Άνω Αντικέρι / Αντίκερος & Κάτω Αντικέρι / Δρίμα / Δρύμα)	Αντίκερος Antikeros, Δρίμα ή Δρύμα Drima. Κέρια Keria.		
Antimilos	Αντίμηλος Antimilos	Εφύρα Efyra, Έφορα Ephora		Ερημόμηλος Erimomhlos
Antiparos	Αντίπαρος Antiparos	Ωλίαρος Holiaros.		
Anydros	Άνυδρος (Αμοργοπούλα) Anydros (Amorgopoula)	Άνυδρος Anydros		
Christiana Islands (group of 3)	Χριστιανή Christiani (largest one), (Εσχάτη) Eschati & (Ασκανιά) Askania	Εσχάτη Eschati.		
Delos	Δήλος Dhilos Delos	Δήλος Dhilos, Δάλος halos.		
Despotiko	Δεσποτικό Despotikó	Πρεπέσινθος Prepesinthus or Prepesinthos.		
Dydimi	Διδύμη (Γάιδαρος, Γαϊδουρονήσι)	Διδύμη Didymi.		
Donousa	Δονούσα Donousa, or Donoussa	Δονούσα Donousa, Δενούσα Denousa.		Stenosa or Spinosa
Dhragonisi	Τραγονήσι (Δραγονήσι) Tragonisi (Dhragonisi)			
Folegandros	Φολέγανδρος Folégandros	Πολύανδρος Poluandros, Φολέκανδρος Pholekandros.		Πολύκαντρο Polikandro
Gyaros	Γυάρος Giáros, Γιούρα Gioura	Γυάρος Giáros.		
Htapodia (Nisída Chtapódia)	Κταπόδια (Σταπόδιο) Ktapodia (Stapodio)	Μελάντιοι Σκόπελοι Melantioi Skopeloi or Melanteioi Skopeloi.		
Ios	Ίος Ios	Ία Ia, Φοινίκη Phoiniki, Αρσινόη Arsinoe.<	Io, Nio	
Irakleia	Ηρακλειά Irakliá	Ηράκλεια Heraklia.		
Kea (Tzia)	Κέα Kéa, Τζια Tziá (Zia)	Κέος Keos, Υδρούσα Hydrousa.	Ceus	Zia
Keros	Κέρος Kéros	Κάρος Κέρεια or Κερία, Karos Kereia or Keria.		
Kimolos	Κίμωλος Kimolos	Εχινούσα Echinoussa, Κίμωλος Kimolos.	Cimolus	Αρζεντιέρα Argentiera
Koufonisi	Κουφονήσια Koufonisia	Κωφός Λιμήν Koufos Limin, Φωκούσα Phocussa.		Κοφινούσα Kofinousa, Pira, Φωκούσα Phocussa
Kythnos	Κύθνος Kithnos	Κύθνος Kithnos, Δρυοπίς Dhryopis, Οφιούσα Ofiousa.	Φέρμινα Fermina	Θήραμνα Theramna, Θερμιά Thermia
Makronisos	Μακρόνησος Makrónisos	Ελένη Helena, Κρανάη Kranae.		
Milos	Μήλος Mílos	Μήλος Mílos, Ζεφυρία Zefyria.	Milo	
Mykonos	Μύκονος Míkonos	Μύκονος Mikonos.	Myconus	Micone
Naxos	Νάξος Náxos	Νάξος Náxos, Δία Dhia.	Naxus	Axia
Pachia	Παχειά (Αναφόπουλο) Pacheia (Anafopoulo)	Μελάντιοι Πέτραι, Melantioi Petrai.		
Paros	Πάρος Páros	Επακτία Epaktia, Δημητριάς Demetrias, Υρία & Υρίη Hyria & Hyrie, Μινωίς Minois, Υληέσσα Hyleessa, Πλατειά Plateia, Στρογγυλή Strongyle Καβαρνίς Cabarnis.	Paro	Υλήεσσα Yliessa
Polyaigos	Πολύαιγος Poliegos	Πολύαιγος Polyaegus, Υπόληβος ή Πόληβος Ipolivos or Polivos.	Polyaegus	
Prasoura	Πρασούρα (Κοπριά) Prasoura (Kopria)			
Rineia	Ρήνεια Rinia	Ρήνεια Rineia or Rhenea, Ῥήνεια Rheneia, Ῥηνα ῖαRhenaia, Ῥήνη Rhene.		
Santorini (Thera)	Σαντορίνη Santoríni, Θήρα Thēra	Στρογγύλη Strongýlē, Καλλίστη ή Καλλιστώ Kallístē or Kallísto, Φιλητέρη ή Φιλωτέρα Filitera or Filotera, Καλαυρία Kalavria, Καρίστη Karisti, Τευσία Teusia, Θηραμένη Thiramenh, Ρήνεια, Rineia.	Θήρα Thera	Σαντορίνη Santoríni Santa Irene
Schinousa	Σχοινούσα Schinousa	Σχινοῦσσα Schinousa.		
Serifopoula	Σεριφοπούλα Serifopoula			
Serifos	Σέριφος Sérifos	Σέριφος Sérifos.	Seriphos	
Sifnos	Σίφνος Sifnos	Μεροπία ή Μερόπη Meropia or Merope, Ακίς Akis.	Sifano	
Sikinos	Σίκινος Sikinos	Σίκινος Sikinos, Οἰνόη Oenoe or Oinoe.	Sikinos	
Syros	Σύρος Siros	Συρίη Syrii (Homer)	Syra	
Thirasia	Θηρασία Thirasiá	Θηρασία Thirasiá.		
Tinos	Τήνος Tinos	Τήνος Tinos, Οφιούσα ή Φιδούσα Ophioussa, Υδρούσα Hydrousa	Tenus	Teno

== The Dodecanese Islands ==
The following Aegean islands are part of the Greek Dodecanese islands:

English	Greek	Ancient Greek	Latin	Medieval	Italian
Agathonisi	Αγαθονήσι Agathonisi	Ψετούσσα Psetousa, Τραγαία Tragaia, Τραγαίαι Trageaii, Τραγιά Tragia.	Hyetoussa		
Anditilos	Αντίτηλος (Άσκινα) Anditilos (Askina).				
Arkoi	Αρκοί Arki	Ακρίται Akrite.			
Armathia	Αρμάθεια Armáthia	Αρμεδών, Ηarmedon.	Armathia		Armathia
Alimia	Αλιμιά Alimiá	Εὔλιμνα Eulimna or Evlimnia.		Alimia	Alinnia, Limona
Astakidonisia	Αστακιδονήσια (Αστακίδες) Astakidonisia (Astakides) (Αστακίδα & Σιάλ/Σύλα/Φωκά & Νήμο & Αστακιδόπουλο/Ατσακιδόπουλο)	αι Αστακίδες the Astakides.	Astakis		Astakida
Astypalaia	Αστυπάλαια Astipálea	Αστυπάλαια Astipálea, Πύρρα Pirra, Πυλαία Pilaia, Θεών Τράπεζα Theon Trapeza, Ιχθυόεσσα Ichthyoessa	Astypalaia	Astypalaia	Stampalia
Avgo Astypalaias	Αυγό Avgo				
Chamili	Χαμηλή Chamili, Χαμηλονησι Chamilonisi				
Divounia (Ouanianisia)	Νησίδες Διβούνια (Ουανίανησια) Nisides Divounia (Ouanianisia).				
Farmakonisi	Φαρμακονήσι Farmakonisi	Φαρμακοῦσσα Pharmakousa	Pharmacussa		Farmaco
Gialesíno	Γιαλεσίνο Gialesino	Διαβάτες Diabatai islets.			
Glaros Kinarou	Γλάρος Glaros	Κίναρος Kinaros.	Cinarus or Cinara		Zinari
Gyali	Γυαλί Gialí Giali or Yali	Ἴστρος Istros.			
Halki	Χάλκι Hálki (alt. Chalce or Chalki)	Χάλκι Chalke.	Khalkeia	Chalceia	
Imia	Ίμια (Λίμνια) Imia (Limnia) (Μεγάλη Ίμνια / Μεγάλη Λιμνιά & Μικρή Ίμνια / Μικρή Λιμνιά)	Heipethes, Aραιαί Araiai.			
Kalolimnos	Καλόλιμνος Kalólimnos	Λεψίμανδος Lepsimandos	Kalolimnos		Kalolimnos
Kalymnos	Κάλυμνος Kálimnos	Καλύδνες ή Καλύδναι, Kalidnes or Kalidnai, Κάλυμνος Calymnos.	Calino		Càlino
Kandelioussa	Καντελιούσσα Kandelioussa	Κορδυλούσα Cordylοusa.	Kandelioussa		Candeliusa
Karpathos	Κάρπαθος Kárpathos	Κράπαθος (Homer) Krapathos, Πορφύρις Porphyris, Τετράπολις Tetrapolis, Ανεμόεσσα Anemoessa	Carpathus	Scarpanto	Scarpanto
Kasos	Κάσος Kásos	Κάσος (Homer) Kásos, Άμφη Amphe, Αρτράβη Artrabe, Αστράβη Astrabe, Άχνη Achnis	Casso		Caso
Kastellórizo (Megisti)	Καστελλόριζο Kastellórizo	Μεγίστη Megisti.		Castelrosso	Castelrosso
Kinaros	Κίναρος Kinaros	Κίναρος Kinaros	Cinarus or Cinara		Zinari
Kos	Κώς Kós	Κώς Kós, Μερρόπις Meropis, Νυμφαία Nymphaea.	Co		Coo
Leros	Λέρος Léros	Λέρος Léros	Leros	Lerus	Lero
Lipsi	Λειψοί Lipsi	Λέψια Lepsia, Λειψός ή Λιψός Lipsos, Λειψώ Lipso			Lisso
Levitha	Λέβιθα Lévitha	Λέβινθος Lebinthus or Lebinthos.			Levita
Liadi Islets	Νησίδες Λιάδι (Λιβάδι) Nisides Liadi (Livadhi) (Μεγάλο Λιάδι & Μικρό Λιάδι)	Λεία Leia.			
Marmarás	Μαρμαράς Marmaras	Διαβάτες Diabatai islands.			
Mavra Levithas	Μαύρα Λεβίθας Mavra Levithas				
Nimos	Νίμος Nimos	Ύμος Ymos			
Nisídes Adelfoí	Νήσοι Αδελφοί (Αδέλφια) Nisoi Adelfoi (Adelfia) (Μεγάλος Αδελφός & Μικρός Αδελφός), Syrnas Islets	Σύρνα Syrna			
Nisyros	Νίσυρος Nísiros or Nisyros	Πορφύρις Porphyris.			Nisiro
Ofidoussa	Οφιδούσσα ή Οφιδούσα Ofidoussa	Οφιδούσσα ή Οφιδούσα Ofidoussa			
Pachia	Παχειά (Παχιά) Pachia	Νισύριον Nisyreion.			
Patmos	Πάτμος Pátmos	Πάτμος Pátmos, Πάτνος Patnos, Λητοΐδα Letois		Palmosa; San Giovanni di Patimo	Patino; Patmo
Pergousa	Περγούσσα ή Περγούσα ή Ριγούσα Pergousa or Rigousa	Περγούσσα Pergousa			
Plati Pserimou	Πλάτη ή Πλατύ Ψερίμου Plati Pserimou	Nήσους τε Καλύδνας Kaludnas Islands (Homer Iliad)			
Pserimos	Ψέριμος Psérimos	Ψήριμος Pserιmος			Cappari
Rho	Ρω Rhó	Ρώγη ή Ρόπη Rhoge or Rhope			Ro
Rhodes	Ρόδος Ródhos	Λίνδος Lindos, Ρόδος Ródhos, Αιθρία Aethria, Αστερία Asteria, Αταβυρία Attavyria, Ηλιάς Helias, Κορυμβία Korymvia, Μακαρία Makarea, Οφιούσα ή Ολόεσσα Ofioussa or Oloessa, Πελαγία Pelagia, Ποήεσσα Poiessa, Ποντία Pontia, Σταδία Stadea, Τελχινίς Telchinis, Τρινακρία Trinacrea	Rhodus	Rodo	Rodi
Saria	Σαρία Saria	Σάρος Sarus or Saros			Saria
Sesklio	Σεσκλιά Sesklia	Τεύτλουσα Teutlousa			
Sofrano Islets	Νησίδες Σοφρανά Nisides Sofrana (Μεγάλο Σοφράνο / Ζαφοράς & Μικρό Σοφράνο & Σοχάς)	Ζαφοράς Zafora	Zafora	Zafora	
Stroggyli Nisyrou	Στρογγυλή Νισύρου Stroggyli Nisyrou				Strongili
Strongyli Kastellorizou	Στρογγύλη Καστελλόριζου Strongyli Kastellorizou	Στρογγύλη Strongyli	Strongili		Strongili
Symi	Σύμη Simi	Καρίκη Karike, Μεταποντίς Metapontis, Αίγλη Aigli, Σύμη Simi			Simi
Syrna	Σύρνα Sirna	Σύρνα Syrna or Sirna, Σύρνος Syrnos	Sirna		Sirna
Telendos	Τέλενδος Télendos	Κέλερις (μέρος των νήσων τε Καλύδνας) Keleris (part of Kalyndas islands)			
Tilos	Τήλος Tílos	Τήλος Tílos, Αγαθούσσα Agathussa also Agathusa and/or Agathousa	Agathoussa	Telus	Piscopi
Trianisia	Τριανήσια (Τρία Νησιά)-(Μεσονήσι, Πλακίδα, Στεφάνια), Trianisia (Three islands)-(Mesonhsi, Plakida, Stefania).				

== The North Aegean Islands ==
The North Aegean islands include the following:

English	Greek	Ancient Greek	Latin	Medieval
Agios Efstratios	Άγιος Ευστράτιος Áyios Efstrátios	Αλόννησος Halonnesus or Halonnesos, Νέα Nea		Chryse S.Stratj
Agios Minas	Άγιος Μηνάς Agios Minas	Φούρνοι Κορσέων (part of Fournoi Korseon Archipelago).		
Alatonisi	Αλατονήσι (Αλατσονήσι) Alatonisi (Alatsonisi)	Φούρνοι Κορσέων (part of Fournoi Korseon Archipelago).		
Ammouliani	Αμμουλιανή Ammouliani	Φούρνοι Κορσέων (part of Fournoi Korseon Archipelago).		
Anthropofas	Ανθρωποφάς Anthropofas	Ανθρωποφάς (Μεγάλος Ανθρωποφάς, Μεγάλος Ανθρωποφάγος, Ανθρώ) Anthropofas, Φούρνοι Κορσέων (part of Fournoi Korseon Archipelago).		
Antipsara	Αντίψαρα Antipsara	Αντίψυρα Antipsyra		
Chios	Χίος Khíos	Χίος Khíos, Κίος ή Κέως Kios or Keos, Οφιούσα Ophioúsa, Πιτυούσα Pityousa, Αριούσα Ariousa, Αιθάλη Ethali, Αρέθουσα Arethousa		Scio
Cunda Μοσχονήσια (Note: Cunda Island is also called Alibey Island (Turkish: Cunda Adası, Alibey Adası). It is located in Balıkesir Province, Turkey)	Εκατόνησα Hekatónisa	Εκατόνησους Hekatonisoi, Ασκανίοι νήσοι, Askanian islands, Πορδοσελίνοι Pordoselinoi.	Hecatonessus	Moshonissia
Fourni Korseon	Φούρνοι Κορσέων Fourni Korséon	Κορσίαι Corsiae or Korsiai, Κορσεαί Corseae or Korseai, Κορσία Corsia or Korsia. Φούρνοι Κορσέων Fournoi Korseon		
Icaria	Ικαρία Ikaria	Ικαρία Ikaria, Δολίχη Doliche Οινόη Oenoe, Ιχθυόεσσα Icthyoessa, Ανεμόεσσα Anemoessa		
Kisiria	Κισηριά (Διάποροι) Kisiria (Diaporoi)	Φούρνοι Κορσέων (part of Fournoi Korseon Archipelago)		
Lemnos	Λήμνος Límnos	Λήμνος Lemnos (Homer), Ανεμόεσσα Anemoessa, Αιθάλεια Aethalia, Πυρόεσσα Pyroessa, Δίπολις Dipolis, Σιντηίς Siintis, Αμπελόεσσα Ampeloessa, Υψιπύλεια Yypsipileia, Ηφαίστεια νήσος Hephaestus island		Stalimeni
Imbros (Note: Imbros or İmroz, officially Gökçeada in Turkish since 29 July 1970 is an Aegean Island in Çanakkale Province, Turkey)	Ίμβρος Imvros	Ίμβρος Imvros (Homer).	Imbro	
Kafkanas	Καυκανάς Kafkanas	Κάπρος Caprus or Kapros		
Kalogeros	Νησίδα Καλόγερος Nisida Kalogeros	Αιξ Aix		
Lesbos	Λέσβος Lésvos	Λέσβος Lésbos, Ἴσσα Íssa		
Nissiopi	Μεγαλονήσι Σιγρίου Λέσβου (Νησιώπη, Νησιώτη, Σίγρι) Megalonisi (Nisiopi)	Νησιώπη Nisiopi		
Oinousses	Οινούσσες Oinousses	Οινούσσες ή Οινούσσα Oinousses or Oinnoussa, Eγνούσα Egnousa		
Pasas	Πασάς (Παναγία) Pasas (Panagiá)	Οινούσσες νησίδες Oinousses islets.		
Psara	Ψαρά Psará	Ψυρίη Psyrih (Homer), Ψυρά & Ψύρα Psyra, Ψυρίαν Psyrian		
Rabbit Islands (Note: Rabbit Islands are Tavşan Adaları or Karayer Adaları in Turkish. They are located in Çanakkale Province, Turkey)	Καλύδναι νήσοι, Kalydnai islands.			
Samiopoula	Σαμιοπούλα Samiopoula	Σαμιοπούλα Samiopoula		
Samos	Σάμος Sámos	Υδρηλή Hydrile, Μελάμφυλλος Melamfillos, Μελάνθεμος Melanthemos, Φυλλίς Phyllis, Ανθεμίς Anthemis, Δόρυσσα Dorryssa, Δρυούσα Dryousa, Κυπαρισσία Kyparissia		
Samothrace	Σαμοθράκη Samothráki	Σαμοθράκη Samothrace, Σαόννησος Saonissos, Λευκοσία Leukosia, Λευκανία Leukania, Λευκωνία Leukonia, Δαρδανία Dardania, Ηλεκρίς Helecris, Αιθιοπία Atheopia		
Sergitsi	Σεργίτσι Λήμνου Sergitsi Limnou	Σιδερίτης Sideritis		
Tenedos (Note: Tenedos is a Turkish island in Çanakkale Province. The Turkish name is Bozcaada)	Τένεδος Ténedhos	Τένεδος, Tenedhos, Λευκοφρύς Leukophrys, Calydna Καλύδνα, Φοινίκη Phoenice, Λυρνεσούς Lyrnessus	Tenedus	
Thasos	Θάσος Thásos	Θάσος Thasos, Αέρια Aeria, Ιέρια Hyeria, Αιθρία Aethria		
Thasopoula	Θασοπουλα Thasopoula	Θασοπουλα Thasopoula		
Thymaina	Θύμαινα Thimena	Θύμαινα Thimena, Φύμαινα Fimena, Φούρνοι Κορσέων (part of Fournoi Korseon Archipelago)		
Thymainaki	Θυμαινάκι Thymainaki	Φούρνοι Κορσέων (part of Fournoi Korseon Archipelago)		
Tokmakia	Τοκμάκια (Τομαρονήσια, Τομάρια, Ασπρονήσια) Tokmakia (Tomaronisia)	Λεύκαι ή Λευκαί, Leukai.		
Uzunada (Note: Uzunada is also called Uzun Ada, Uzun Adalari, Uzun Adaları, Uzunadalar, Vrachonisides Makronisia, or Vrachonisídes Makronísia. It is located in İzmir Province, Turkey.)	Εγγλεζονήσι (Μακρονήσι) Englezonisi (Makronisi)	Δρυμούσα Drymoussa, Εγκλαζομενήσια Enklazomenes islands.		
Zourafa	Ζουράφα (Λαδόξερα, Λαδοξέρα) Zourafa (Ladoksera)			

See also List of islands of Turkey#Aydın Province, List of islands of Turkey#Balıkesir Province, and List of islands of Turkey#Çanakkale Province for additional Turkish island in the North Aegean.

== The Saronic Islands ==
The following Aegean islands are part of the Saronic Islands:

English	Greek	Ancient Greek
Aegina	Αίγινα Aegina	Αίγινα Aegina
Agios Georgios	Άγιος Γεώργιος (Σαν Τζώρτζης) Agios Georgios Hydras	Βέλβινα Velvina.
Agistri	Αγκίστρι Ankistri	Κεκρυφάλεια Kekryfaleia
Arsida	Αρσίδα (Ελεούσα, Ελαιούσα, Αρτσιδάς, Αργέντας) Arsida	Αρσίδα Arsidha.
Dokos	Δοκός Dokós	Απεροπία Aperopia, Δοκός Dokós
Falkonera	Φαλκονέρα (Γερακούνια) Falkonera (Gerakounia)	Ιεράκλεια Hieraklia
Hydra	Ύδρα Idra	Ύδρα Hydrea, Υδρούσα Hydroussa.
Poros	Πόρος Póros	Σφαίρα Sphairia, Καλαυρία Calauria.
Salamis	Σαλαμίνα Salamína	Σαλαμίς Salamis
Patroklos (Attica)	Πάτροκλος Patroklos	Πάτροκλος Patroklus
Spetses	Σπέτσες Spétses	Πιτυούσσα Pityussa, Πιτυόνησος Pityonissos

== The Sporades ==
The following Aegean islands are part of the Sporades:

English	Greek	Ancient Greek	Latin
Adelfoi Islets	Αδελφοί Adelfoi	Αδελφοί Adelfoi	
Alonissos	Αλόννησος Alónnisos	Ίκος Ikos, Διάδρομοι Diadromoi, Δρόμοι Dromoi, Ηλιοδρόμια Heliodromia	
Gioura	Γιούρα Gioura	Γεροντία Gerontia	
Kyra Panagia (Pelagos)	Κυρά Παναγιά Kirá Panagiá	Πέλαγος Pelagos, Έφθυρος Ephthyros	
Peristera	Περιστέρα Peristéra	Ευδεμία, Eudemia	
Piperi	Πιπέρι ή Καλαπόδι Pipéri or Kalapodi	Ιρρεσία Irresia	
Podia	Πόδια (Ποδιές) Podia		
Psathoura	Ψαθούρα Psathoura	Ψαθούρα Psathoura.	
Sarakino	Σαρακηνό ή Σαρακήνικο Sarakino ορ Sarakiniko		
Skantzoura	Σκάντζουρα Skántzoura, Σκάνδηρα Skandira.		
Skiathos	Σκιάθος Skiáthos	Σκιάθος Skiáthos	Sciathos and Sciathus
Skopelos	Σκόπελος Skópelos	Πεπάρηθος Peparethos or Peparethus, Σκόπελος Skópelos	
Skyropoula	Σκυροπούλα Skiropoula		
Skyros	Σκύρος Skiros	Σκύρος Skiros-Skyros and/or Skyron-Skiron ("stone"), Αιγίβοτος Aigivotos, Ανεμόεσσα Anemoessa, Πελασγία Pelasgia, Δολοπία Dolopia, Περίρρυτος Perirrytos, Πελαγία Pelagia.	
Tsougria	Τσουγκριά Tsougria	Πολύαιγος Polyaigos.	

== Creten and Ionian Sea islands ==
The following islands are part of the Cretan islands of the Aegean Sea and the Ionian Sea. (Note: The Ionian Sea is not part of the Aegean Sea. Islands on the southern coast of Crete are part of the Libyan Sea.)

English	Greek	Ancient Greek	Latin	Medieval
Agioi Theodoroi	Άγιοι Θεόδωροι Agioi Theodoroi	Κοίτη Coete or Koite and Akytos		
Antikythera	Αντικύθηρα (Τσιριγότο) Antikythera	Αἰγιλία Aegilia or Aigilia, Αἴγιλα Aegila or Aigila, Αιγιαλία Aigialeia, Ογύλος Ogylos		
Avgo Lasithou	Αυγό Λασιθίου Avgo Lasithou			
Chrysi	Χρυσή (Γαϊδουρονήσι) Chrysi	Χρυσή Chrysi, Χρυσέα Chrisea.		
Crete	Κρήτη Kríti	Αερία Aeria, Χθονία Cthonia, Δολιχή Dolichi, Τελχινία Telchinia, Ιδαία Idaia, ΜακαρίαMakaria, Κουρήτις Kourites, Κρήτη Crete.	Creta	Candia and Chandax
Dia	Δία Dia	Δία Dia.		
Dionysades (Gianysades)	Διονυσιάδες (Γιανυσάδες) (Γιανυσάδα & Δραγονάδα & Παξιμάδα & Παξιμαδάκι)	Διονυσιάδες Dionysiades.		
Elafonisi Chanion	Ελαφονήσι Χανίων Elafonisi Chanion	Μουσαγόρες Νήσοι-Μουσαγέτης Απόλλων Mousagores Nhsoi-Mousagetis Apollon.		
Gavdopoula	Γαυδοπούλα Gavdopoula	Οφιούσα Ofyoussa.		
Gavdos	Γαύδος Gávdos	Γαύδος Gávdos, Ωγυγία Ogygia	Kaudos	
Gramvousa	Γραμβούσα (Γραμπούσα) Gramvousa (Ήμερη Γραμβούσα & Άγρια Γραμβούσα)	Κώρυκος Korykos, Τρίτος Tretos		
Koufonisi	Κουφονήσι Koufonisi	Λεύκη Leuce, Ονεσία Onesia	Leuke	
Kythira	Κύθηρα (Τσιρίγο)	Πορφυρούσα Porfyroussa, Κυθέρεια Kytheria, Κύθηρα Kythira		
Loutro	Λουτρό Loutro	Φοίνιξ Phoenix.	Phoinix	
Pontikonisi	Ποντικονήσι Pontikonisi	Μύλη Myle.		
Spinalonga	Σπιναλόγκα (Καλυδών) Spinalonga	Καλυδών Kalydon.	spina lunga	

== Euboea and surrounding islands ==
The following island are on or near the island of Euboea:

English	Greek	Ancient Greek	Medieval
Argyronison Magnisias	Αργυρόνησο (Αργυρόνησος) Argyroniso		
Elafonisos	Ελαφόνησος Elafonisos	Όνου Γνάθος Onou Gnathos.	
Euboea	Εύβοια Evia	Εύβοια Evia, Μάκρις Macris, Δολίχη Doliche,Ελλοπία Ellopia, Αονία Aonia, Αβαντίς Abantis	Χαλκίς Chalcis or Εὔριπος Euripos, Εὔβοια Euboea
Lichadonisia	Λιχαδονήσια Lichadonisia (Μονολιά & Στρογγύλη)	Λιχάδες Νήσοι Lichades Islands.	
Mandilou	Μανδηλού Mandilou	Μύρτος Myrtos.	
Petalii	Πεταλιοί Petalii	Πεταλίαι Petaliai.	
Pontikonisi Euboeas	Ποντικονήσι Ευβοίας Pontikonisi Euboeas	Αρτεμισία Artemisia.	
Raftis	Ράφτης (Ράφτη) Raftis	Πρασιές ή Πρασία ή Πρασιά Prasies or Prasia or Prasia	
Styra	Στύρα Styra(Homer Iliad)		

== See also ==
- List of islands of Greece
- List of islands in the Mediterranean
- List of islands
- List of islands of Turkey#Aegean Sea islands
