= Psathi =

Psathi may refer to the following places:

== Cyprus ==
- Psathi, Paphos

== Greece ==
- Psathi, Arcadia, a village in Arcadia
- Psathi, Ios, a village on the island of Ios, Cyclades
- Psathi, Kimolos, the port of the island Kimolos, Cyclades
