= Macrovipera lebetinus schweizeri =

Species of snake

Macrovipera schweizeri, the Milos viper, also known as the Cyclades blunt-nosed viper, is a subspecies of venomous snake in the family Viperidae. The subspecies is endemic to the Cyclades Archipelago of Greece in the Aegean Sea.

== Etymology ==
The subspecific name, schweizeri, is in honor of Swiss herpetologist Hans Schweizer (1891–1975).

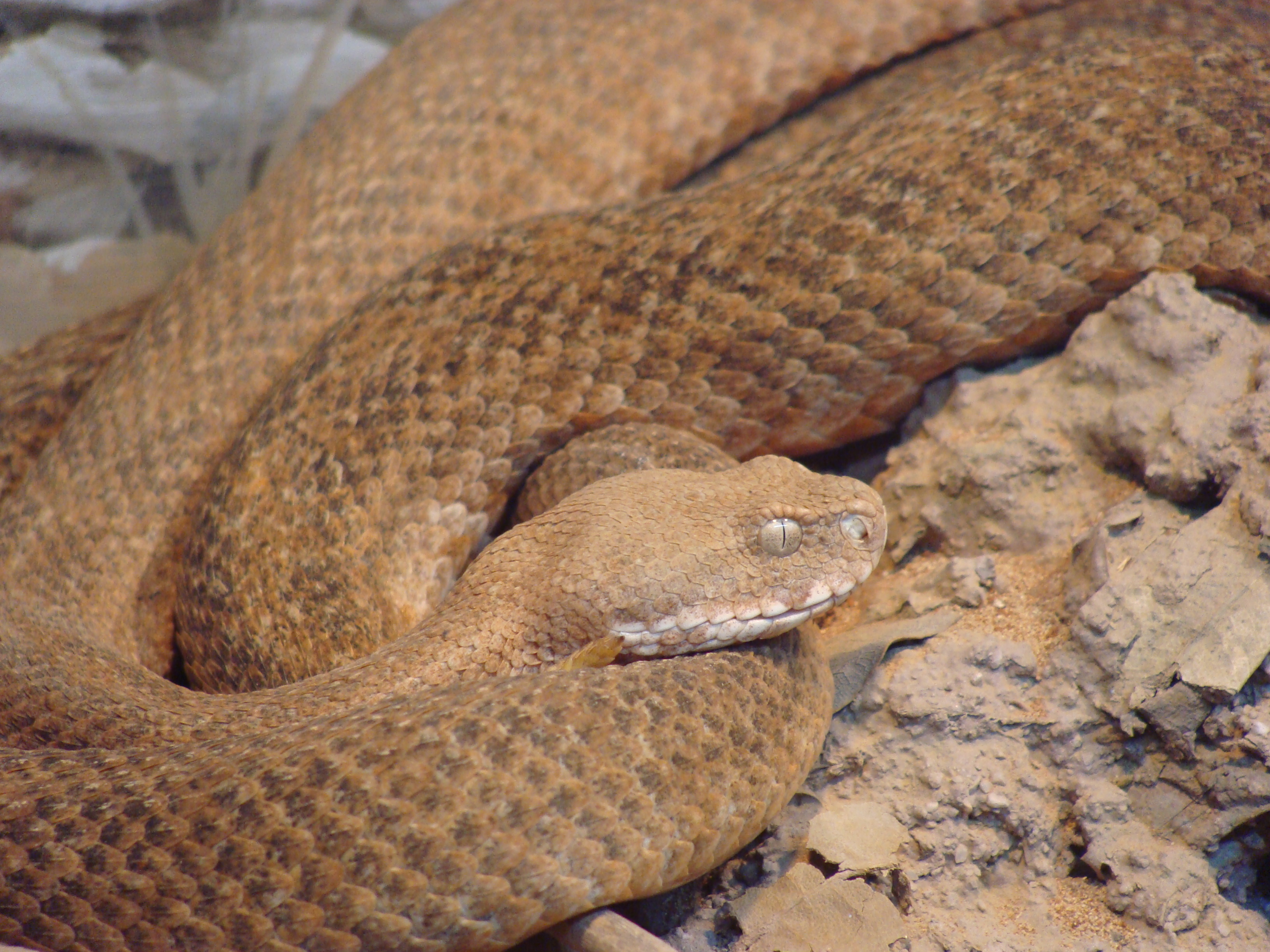
Natural History Museum of Crete, Heraklion.

== Description ==
Milos vipers grow to an average total length (including tail) of 50–70 cm (20–28 in), with a maximum of 98.5 cm (38.8 in).

== Geographic range ==
Milos vipers are found on the Greek islands of the Cyclades Archipelago in the Aegean Sea: Milos, Siphnos, Kimolos and Poliaigos. The type locality is given as "Insel Milos ".

== Biology ==
=== Feeding ===
Gut analysis of road killed specimens showed that adults feed on passerine birds, while young vipers under 35 cm feed primarily on Milos wall lizards and European copper skinks. This adaptation to feeding on birds and lizards likely occurred because of the lack of native rodent species in the western Cyclades (house mice and black rats were introduced). While largely terrestrial, they have seasonally arboreal behaviour, foraging for prey in trees on autumn nights.

== Conservation status ==
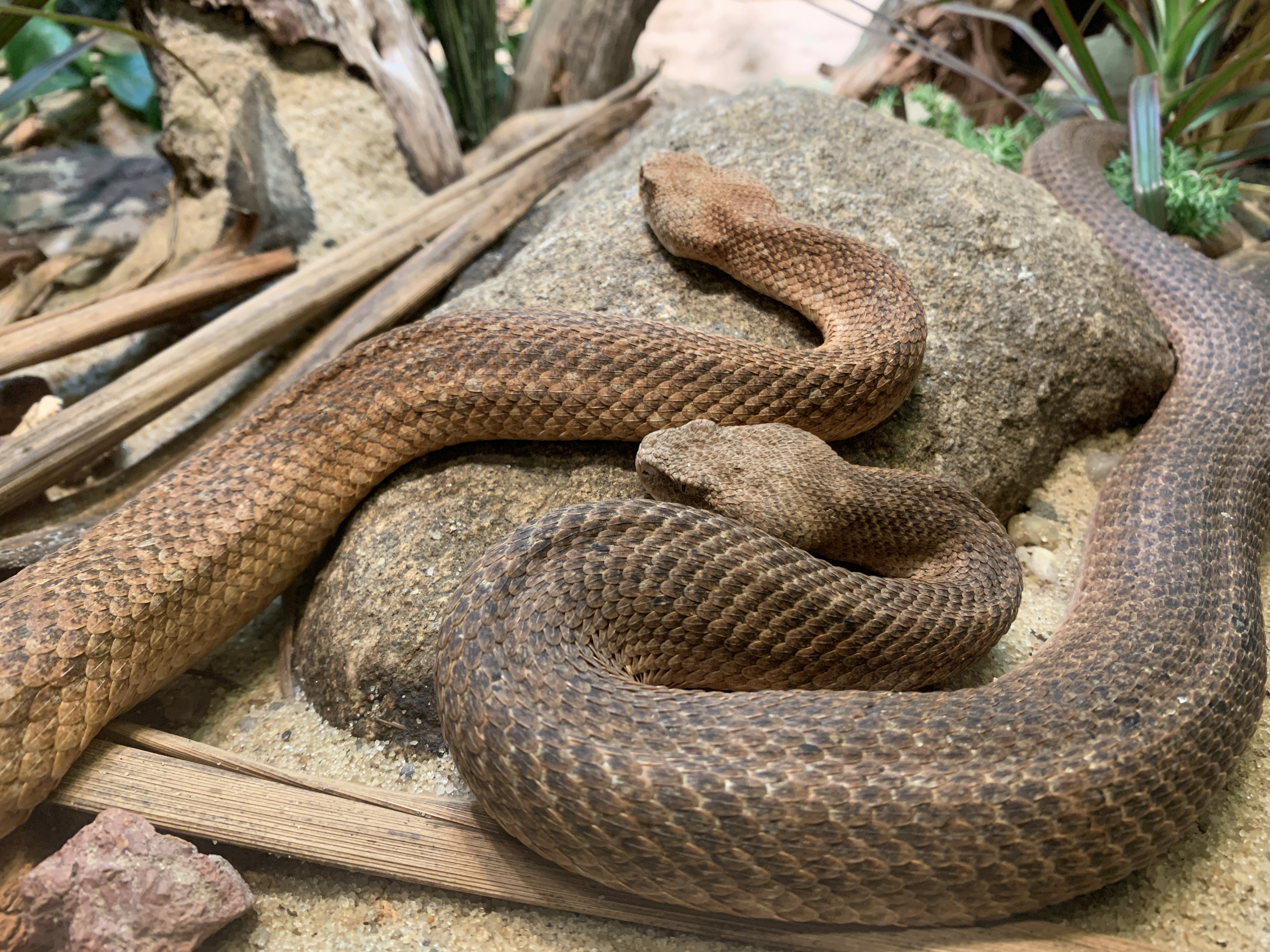
Milos vipers, Bronx Zoo.

This subspecies, M. l. schweizeri, is classified as endangered by the IUCN; less than 4000 adult individuals exist in the wild as of 2022. Furthermore, a continuing decline is observed due to being killed by feral cats, persecution and over-collecting by collectors, and its habitat continues to decline in extent and quality. As of 1998, 500-600 adults were being either removed from the wild or killed per year as a result of illegal collection, road-killing, or persecution.

It is also listed as strictly protected (Appendix II) under the Berne Convention.

== Venom ==
Local medical centres report that snake bites from this species occur on average once per year on Kimolos and 4 times per year on Milos, although there are no recorded fatalities.

It is narrated by G.A. Boulenger in his book The Snakes of Europe that "Dr. de Bedriaga observed this much dreaded snake, the bite of which is probably as bad as that of its Indian ally, the Daboia, Vipera russelli ". It is probable that the snake he assumed was Macrovipera lebetina is in fact the Milos Viper.
