= Ananes =

Group of islands in Greece

Native name: Ανάνες
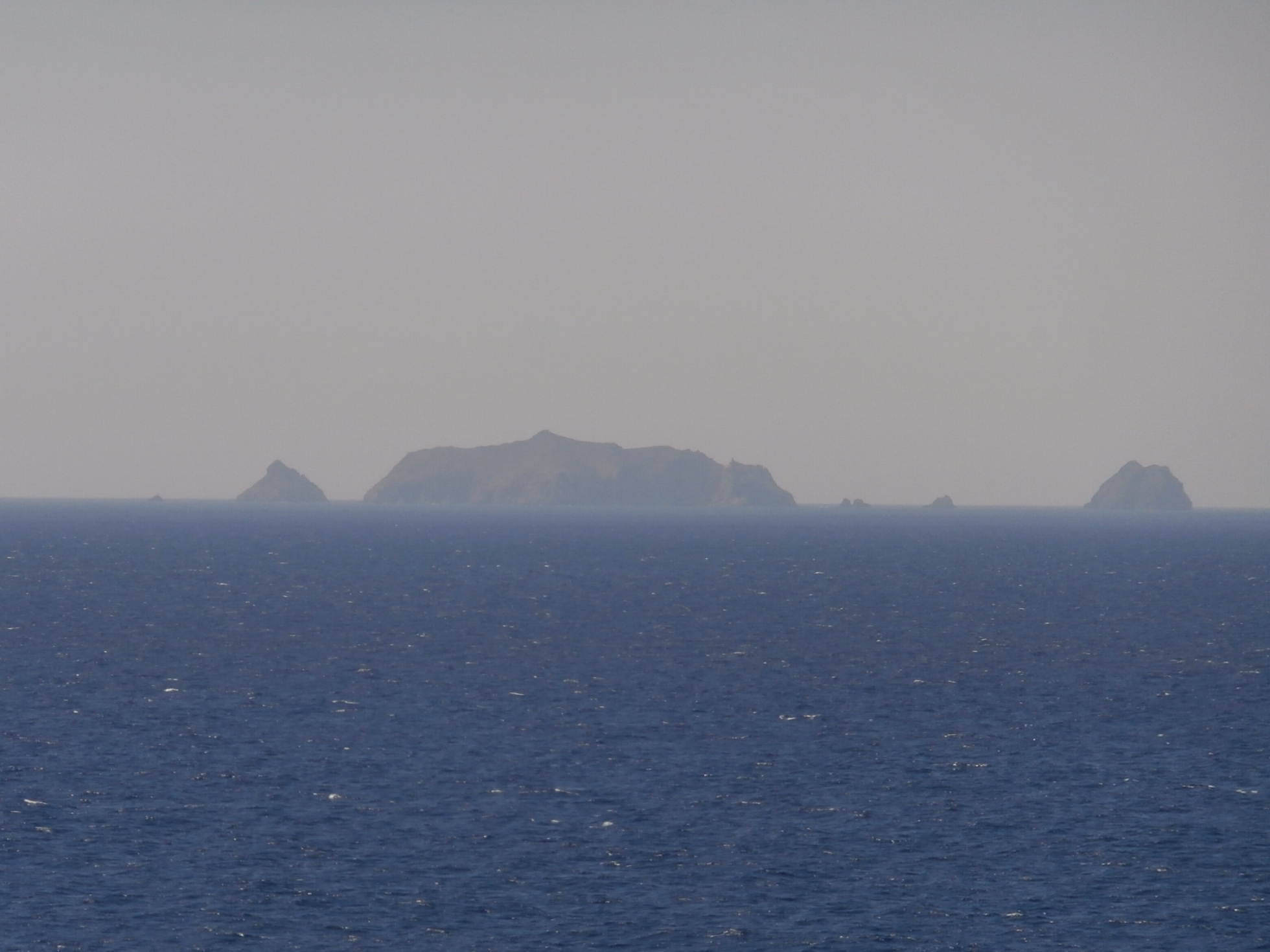
- The islands seen from the East

- Location within Greece

Geography
- Coordinates: 36°33′06″N 24°08′46″E
- Archipelago: Cyclades
- Total islands: 7
- Area: 0.13 km^{2} (0.050 sq mi)

Administration
- Greece
- Region: South Aegean
- Regional unit: Milos

Demographics
- Population: 0 (2011)

Ananes (Greek: Ανάνες) (sometimes called the Ananes Rocks) is a group of 7 small uninhabited islets in Greece's Aegean Sea, on the outskirts of the Cyclades island group. They are arranged in a crescent-like shape from southwest to due north, and comprise the south-westernmost islands of the Cyclades. The nearest islands are Milos and Antimilos to the northeast and Falkonera to the northwest.

The islands, along with the nearby similarly uninhabited Velopoula and Falkonera are protected areas under the Natura 2000 network.

The largest island of the group comprises more than half of the total area, at 0.096 square kilometres (0.037 mi^{2}). The 2 remaining larger islands are 0.018 square kilometres (0.0069 mi^{2}) and 0.011 square kilometres (0.0042 mi^{2}) respectively, with the four remaining islets and rocks contributing the remaining 2,400 square metres (0.59 acres).
