= Falkonera =

Uninhabited Greek island

Native name: Φαλκονέρα
- Location within Greece

Geography
- Location: Aegean Sea
- Coordinates: 36.842°N 23.885°E
- Archipelago: Saronic Islands
- Area: 1.15 km^{2} (0.44 sq mi)
- Highest elevation: 183 m (600 ft)

Administration
- Greece
- Region: Attica
- Regional unit: Islands
- Municipality: Spetses

Demographics
- Population: 0

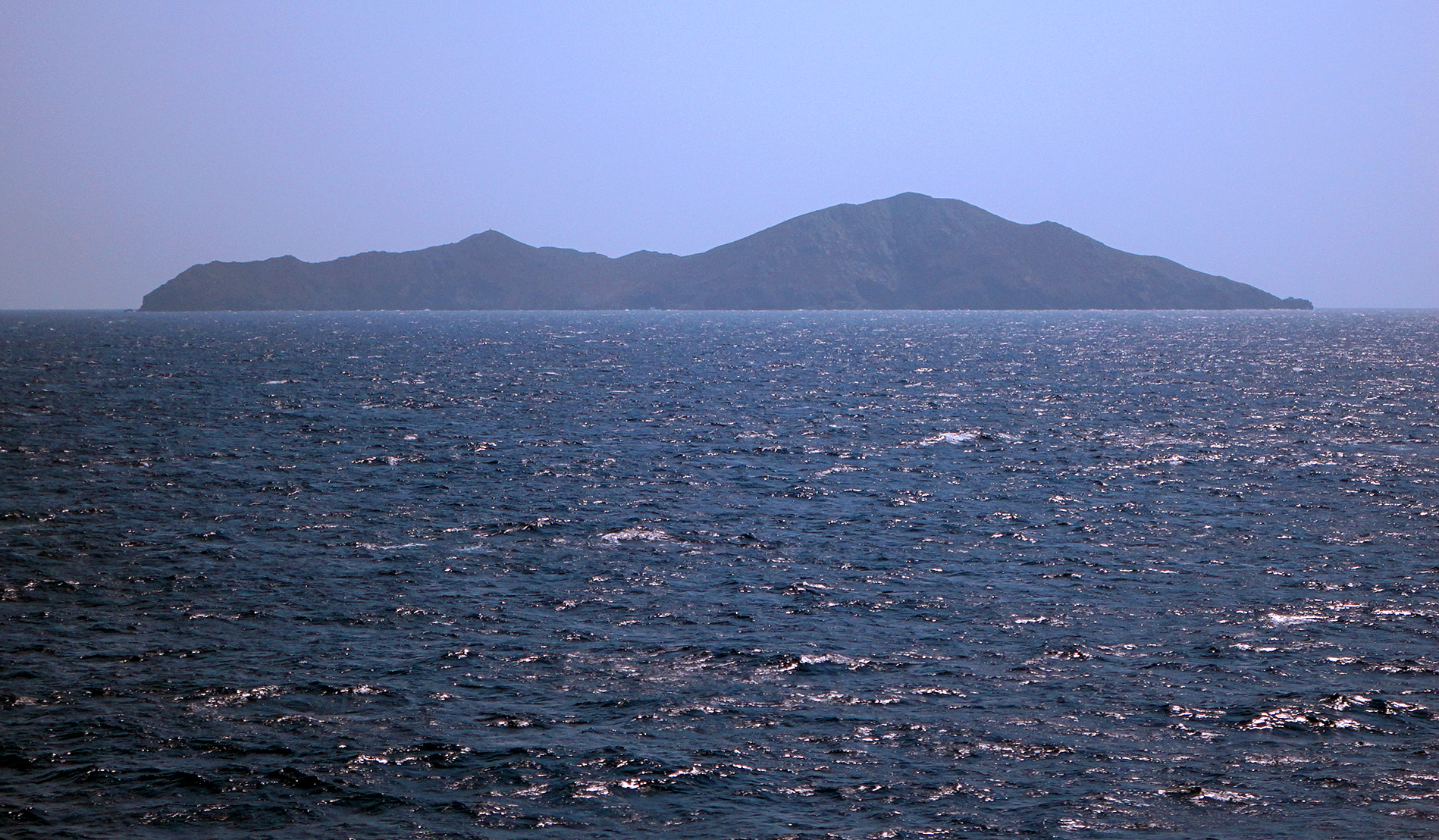
Falkonera in 2012

Falkonera (Greek: Φαλκονέρα) or Gerakoulia (Γερακούλια), anciently known as Hierakia (Ἱεράκια), is a small uninhabited Greek island in the southwestern Aegean Sea, between the island of Milos and the Peloponnese region. Although outside the Saronic Gulf, it is generally included among the Saronic Islands. The islet marks the summit of a horst tending WNW-ESE, which separates the Myrtoon basin to the north from the Cretan basin to the south.

The island is administered as part of the Islands regional unit, part of the municipality of Spetses. Located at the crossing of the Piraeus–Chania and Cape Maleas–İzmir shipping lanes, it is considered a significant navigational hazard due to the strong surrounding currents. At the island's eastern cape, named Panaghia ton revmaton (Παναγιά των Ρευμάτων), meaning "Panagia of the currents", there is a lighthouse that was destroyed by the Germans in 1941 and rebuilt after World War II. The highest point of the island is 183 meters above sea level.

The name "Falkonera" derives from the Venetian word "falconera" (cf. Italian "falconiera"), meaning "place of falcons". This is also the meaning of the alternate Greek name, Gerakoulia.

During the Greek Revolution, the island was served as a unification point for Andreas Miaoulis's and Dimitrios Sachtouris's squadrons before the campaign of Milos.

In the early hours of 8 December 1966, the ferry SS Heraklion, en route from Chania to Piraeus, sank off the coast of Falkonera, resulting in 217 lives lost, with 47 survivors found on Falkonera. Known as the "Falkonera Shipwreck", it is considered one of the worst maritime accidents in Greek history.

Falkonera is part of the Natura 2000 network with code GR3000011, together with the nearby uninhabited islands of Velopoula and Ananes. The isolated island has two zones of vegetation, a salt-tolerant shore zone and a zone beyond the reach of salt spray of the type called phrygana in Greece, and more generally garrigue. It is one of the few Aegean islands that supports a population of the Milos wall lizard, Podarcis milensis.
