= Agios Dimitrianos =

Agios Dimitrianos Άγιος Δημητριανός
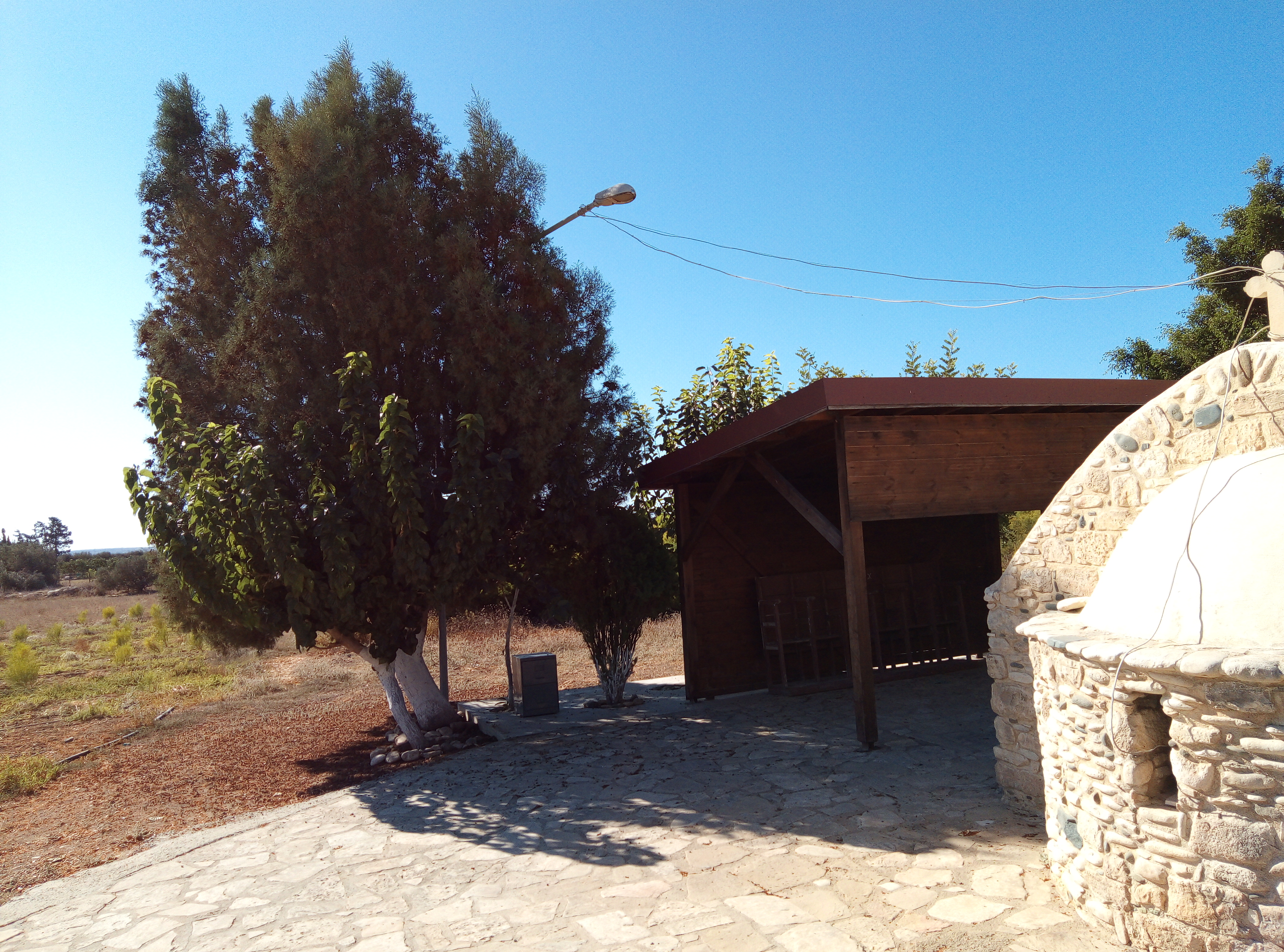
- Local chapel

- Location in Cyprus
- Coordinates: 34°54′22″N 32°33′1″E
- Country: Cyprus
- District: Paphos District
- Elevation: 515 m (1,690 ft)
- Highest elevation: 570 m (1,870 ft)
- Lowest elevation: 300 m (980 ft)

Population (2001)
  - Total: 85
- Time zone: UTC+2 (EET)
  - Summer (DST): UTC+3 (EEST)
- Postal code: 8741
- Website: https://agiosdimitrianos.com

Agios Dimitrianos (Greek: Άγιος Δημητριανός) is a village in the Paphos District of Cyprus, located 12 km west of Pano Panagia. Agios Dimitrianos has an elevation of 564 m. The annual rainfall here is 640 mm.

The village was named after the church of Agios Dimitrianos located in the area.

Built among low hills and many vineyards, Agios Dimitrianos is a small settlement of approximately 70 inhabitants who live in traditional stone houses with wooden doors and balconies. Tourist accommodation includes rooms for rent and traditional guesthouses.

Nearby communities include Polemi and Psathi.
