= Serifopoula =

Greek island

Native name: Σεριφοπούλα
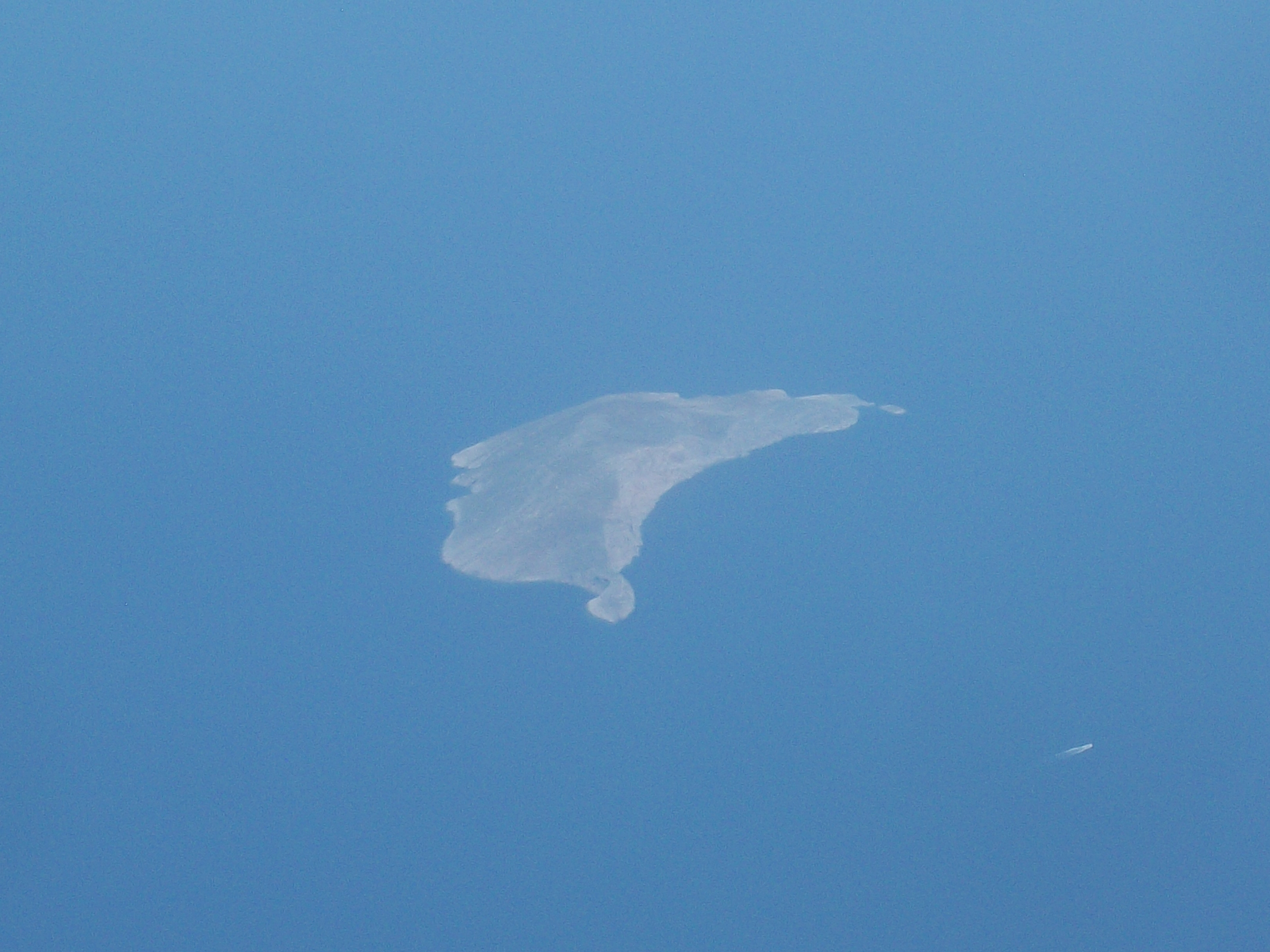
- Aerial view of Serifopoula

- Location within Greece

Geography
- Coordinates: 37.256°N 24.6°E
- Archipelago: Cyclades
- Total islands: 2
- Area: 1.37 km^{2} (0.53 sq mi)
- Highest elevation: 173 m (568 ft)

Administration
- Greece
- Region: South Aegean
- Regional unit: Milos

Demographics
- Population: 0 (2001)

Additional information
- Postal code: 840 02
- Area code: 22810
- Vehicle registration: EM

Serifopoula (Greek: Σεριφοπούλα) is a Greek island in the Cyclades. It is a part of the municipality of Serifos. Serifopoula was uninhabited at the 2001 Greek census. The island is largely barren of vegetation, and consists of a large main island 1.36 square kilometres (0.53 mi^{2}) in size, and a small rock, separated by a narrow 19 metres (62 ft) strait to the island's east, 5,130 square metres (1.27 acres) in size.
