= Rabbit Islands (Çanakkale) =

Group of Turkish islands in the Aegean Sea

Coordinates: 39.934°N 26.065°E

The Rabbit Islands (Turkish: Tavşan adaları or Karayer adaları; Greek: Λαγούσες or Μαυρυές νήσοι) are a group of small uninhabited Turkish islands in the northern Aegean Sea. They are situated approximately 7 kilometres (4 mi) off the mainland coast of the Turkish province of Çanakkale, 10 kilometres (6 mi) north of the island of Tenedos (Bozcaada), and 13 kilometres (8 mi) south-west of the entrance of the straights of the Dardanelles. The largest islet of the group, called Tavşan adası or Rabbit Island proper, is some 2 kilometres (1 mi) long and 600 metres (1,969 ft) wide. To its south are three small rocky islets called Pırasa, Orak and Yılan.

The Rabbit Islands gained some political and strategic significance in the early 20th century, because their territorial waters are important for the control of the entrance to the Dardanelles. They were assigned to Turkey in the Treaty of Lausanne, where they are mentioned in Article 12 along with the nearby larger islands of Tenedos and Imbros (Gökçeada), as the only Aegean islands to be retained by Turkey that are more than three nautical miles away from its mainland coast.

Today, the islets are a popular spot for diving enthusiasts.
