= Pasas, Oinousses =

Greek island in the Aegean Sea

Pasas or Panagia
Native name: Πασάς or Παναγιά
- Location within Greece

Geography
- Coordinates: 38°30′30″N 26°17′10″E
- Area: 2.448 km^{2} (0.945 sq mi)

Administration
- Greece
- Region: North Aegean
- Regional unit: Chios
- Municipality: Oinousses

Demographics
- Population: 0 (2011)

Pasas or Panagia (Greek: Πασάς, Παναγιά) is a small Greek island of the Oinousses complex in the Aegean Sea, located east of Oinousses, the largest island of the complex. Administratively, Pasas and the rest of the islands form the Oinousses municipality within the Chios regional unit.

With an area of 2.448 km^{2}, it is the second largest island of the complex. According to 2011 census, the island is uninhabited, although a guard of lighthouse lives often there and a military garrison is permanently stationed on it. The most notable building on the island is the old lighthouse which was built in 1863 and has a height of 8.5 meters. Since 1995, the lighthouse has been converted to solar power and it keeps a permanent staff.

== Name ==
The island's name Pasas derives from the Ottoman-era term Pasha, while Panagia derives from the Greek name for Virgin Mary.

== European migrant crisis ==
During the European migrant crisis, Pasas has been in the frontline of Greek islands that have witnessed the arrival of immigrants from Turkey.

== Infrastructure ==
The island of Pasas features a lighthouse which from 1995 has been converted to solar power, a military building with a permanent army garrison, and a heliport. The island recently got connected to the Greek mains electricity network and Oinousses through an underwater cable.
