= Sarakino =

Island in Greece

Native name: Σαρακηνό
- Location within Greece

Geography
- Coordinates: 38.755°N 24.610°E
- Archipelago: Sporades
- Highest elevation: 131 m (430 ft)

Administration
- Greece
- Region: Central Greece
- Regional unit: Euboea
- Municipality: Skyros

Demographics
- Population: 0 (2011)

Sarakino (Greek: Σαρακηνό) is a Greek island in the Sporades south of Skyros. As of 2011, it had no resident population.
