= Polyaigos =

Island off Kimolos, Greece

Native name: Πολύαιγος
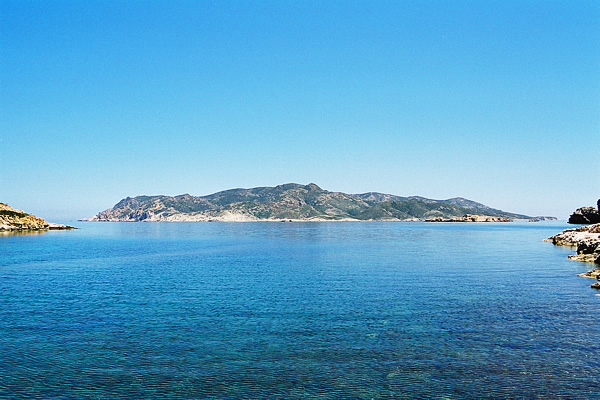
- Picture of Polyaigos

- Location within Greece

Geography
- Coordinates: 36°45′5″N 24°38′11″E
- Archipelago: Cyclades
- Area: 18.146 km^{2} (7.006 sq mi)
- Highest elevation: 370 m (1210 ft)
- Highest point: Psilo Vouno

Administration
- Greece
- Region: South Aegean
- Regional unit: Milos

Demographics
- Population: 0 (2001)

Additional information
- Postal code: 840 00
- Area code: 228x0
- Vehicle registration: EM

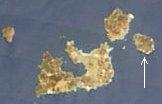
Polyaigos, east of Milos and Kimolos.

Polýaigos (Greek: Πολύαιγος; Latin: Polyaegus) is an uninhabited Greek island in the Cyclades near Milos and Kimolos. It is part of the community of Kimolos (Κοινότητα Κιμώλου). Its name means "many goats", since it is inhabited only by goats. It was mentioned by several ancient geographers: Ptolemy, Pliny the Elder, and Pomponius Mela.

Along its longest axis, it is 6 kilometres (4 mi) and among its shortest 4.3 kilometres (3 mi) wide. It has a surface area of approx. 18 km^{2} (7 sq mi) and a coastal length of 22 to 27 kilometres (14 to 17 mi). It is very close to the island of Kimolos (2 km (1 mi) north west from Polyaigos) and to the island of Milos (6.2 km (4 mi) west from Polyaigos). There are two mountains, Stroggylo which rises to 330 metres (1,083 ft) and Psilo Vouno (370 metres (1,214 ft)).

The island is to a great extent privately owned by the Greek Orthodox church, which sublets parts of it to local herdsmen from the nearby islands of Milos and Kimolos.

Its goat population maintains Polyaigos as a barren island. It has, however, some magnificent beaches, mainly on the southern part of the island, as well as many sea-surface caves, which serve as a refuge to a dwindling population of Mediterranean monk seals (Monachus monachus).
