= Samiopoula =

Greek islet in the Aegean Sea

Native name: Σαμιοπούλα
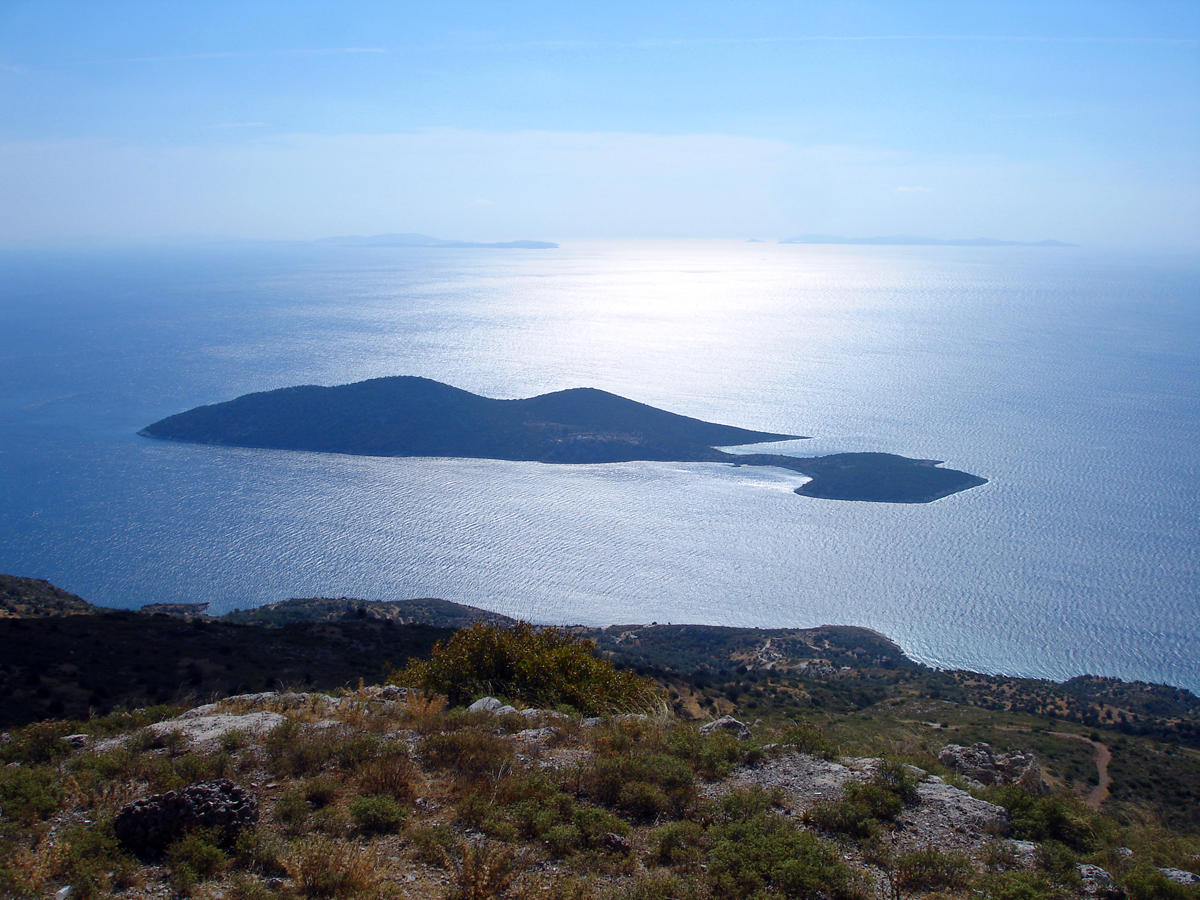
- Samiopoula as seen from mount Bournias on the south of Samos island

- Location within Greece

Geography
- Coordinates: 37.628°N 26.794°E
- Archipelago: North Aegean

Administration
- Greece
- Region: North Aegean
- Regional unit: Samos

Demographics
- Population: 5 (2001)

Additional information
- Postal code: 931 xx
- Area code: 227x0
- Vehicle registration: MO

Samiopoula (Greek: Σαμιοπούλα) is a Greek islet located on the south of Samos Island and at a distance of 0.85 km (0.46 nmi). It is under the authority of the regional unit of Samos and the local jurisdiction of the municipal unit of Pythagoreio. The 2001 census reported a population of five inhabitants. The name Samiopoula is a derivative of Samos (in Greek Σάμος) and literally means "small Samos".

== Geography ==
The islet measures approximately 2.15 km (1.34 mi) in length and .7 km (0.43 mi) in width. There are few buildings on Samiopoula, mainly the small parish churches of Agia Pelagia (in Greek Αγία Πελαγία) and of the Ascension of Christ (in Greek: Αναλήψεως του Σωτήρος), a small tavern and few small houses and shelters. Electricity and telephone services are provided via underwater cables from nearby Samos. Photovoltaic systems provide some alternative electrical power. There are few cisterns on the island and rainwater is conserved throughout winter. Most of the terrain is rocky with very few trees and several species of wild bushes, shrubs and wildflowers. Wild goats out-number the few inhabitants by far, even when visitors and tourists storm the little island during the summer season. The islet is easily accessible during the tourist season via daily excursions from the ports of Pythagoreio and Ormos Marathokampou. The only beach on the island, Psalida (in Greek Ψαλίδα), is quite small and may be crowded during peak summer season though it offers uniquely beautiful white sands and turquoise waters. Sailing boats typically approach the islet through the small bay of Katsakas (in Greek Κατσακάς) which is sheltered by the prevailing north-westerly winds.

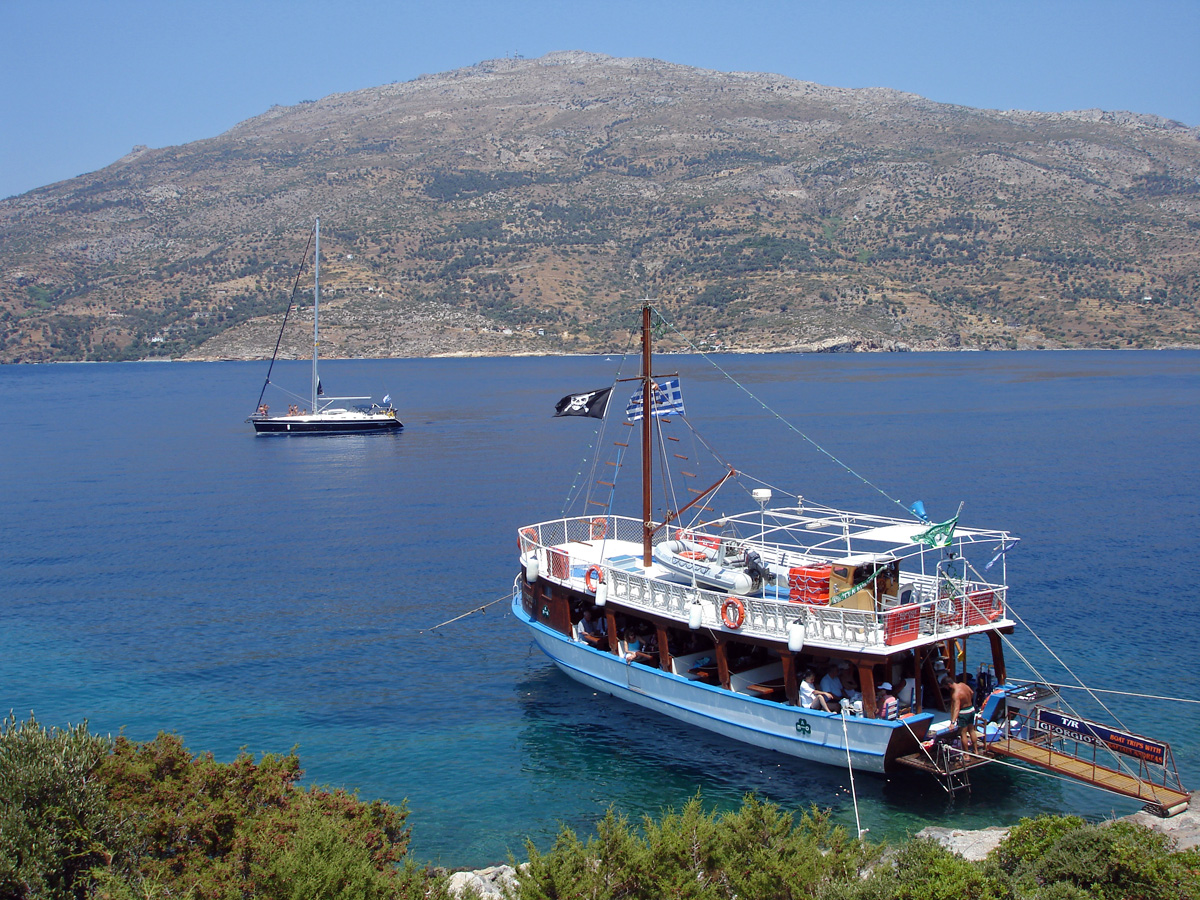
Visitors arriving at Katsakas bay, Samiopoula

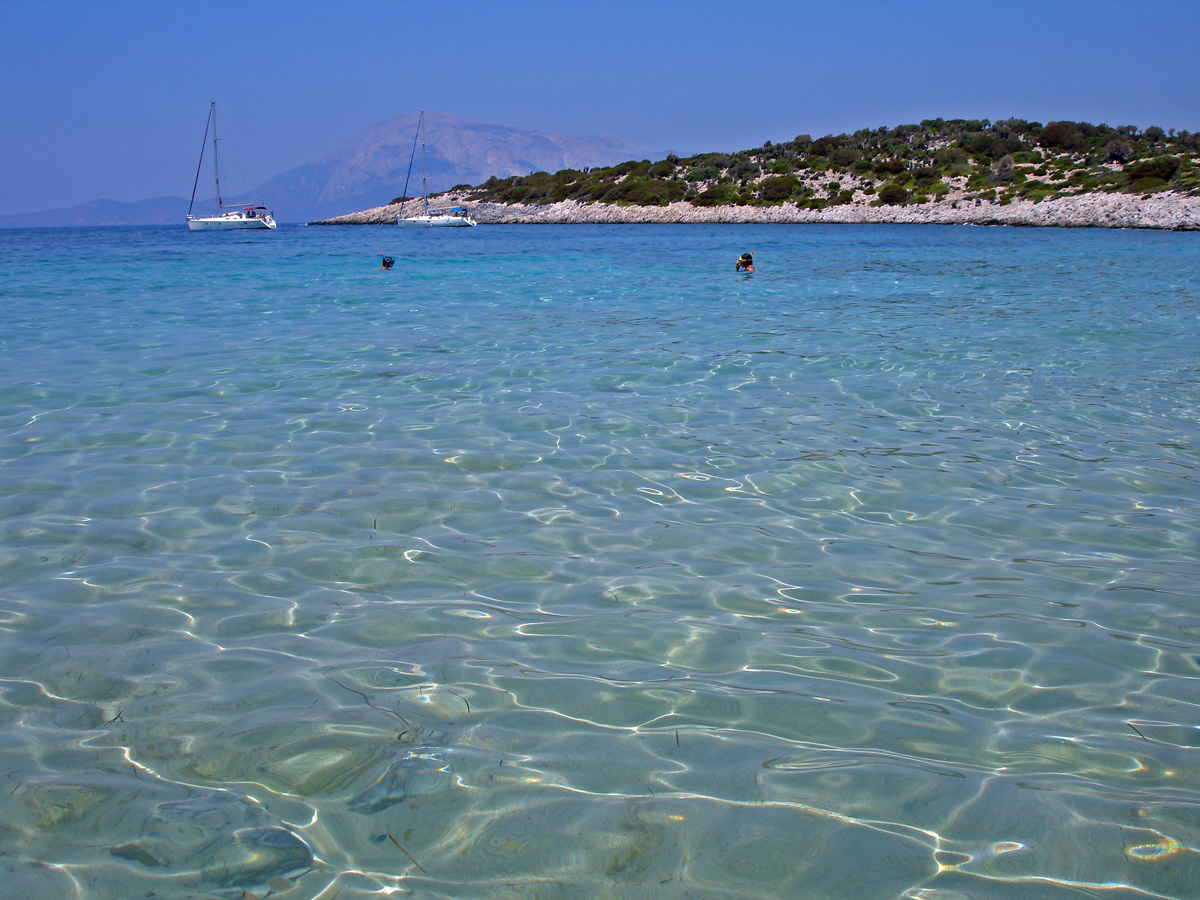
Psalida beach on the island of Samiopoula
