= Aegean Islands =

Aegean Islands (Greece) Νήσοι Αιγαίου Nísoi Aigaíou
- Geographic region of Greece
- Aegean Islands (blue) within Greece
- Country: Greece

Aegean Islands (Turkey) Ege Adaları
- Aegean Islands (blue) within Turkey
- Country: Turkey

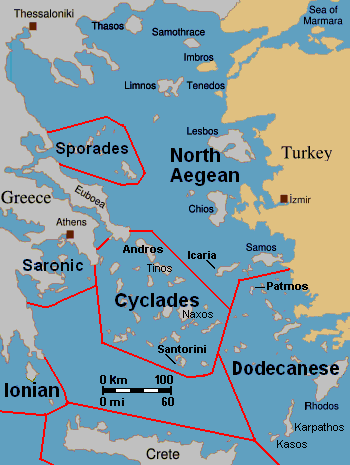
Aegean Sea Islands map showing island groups

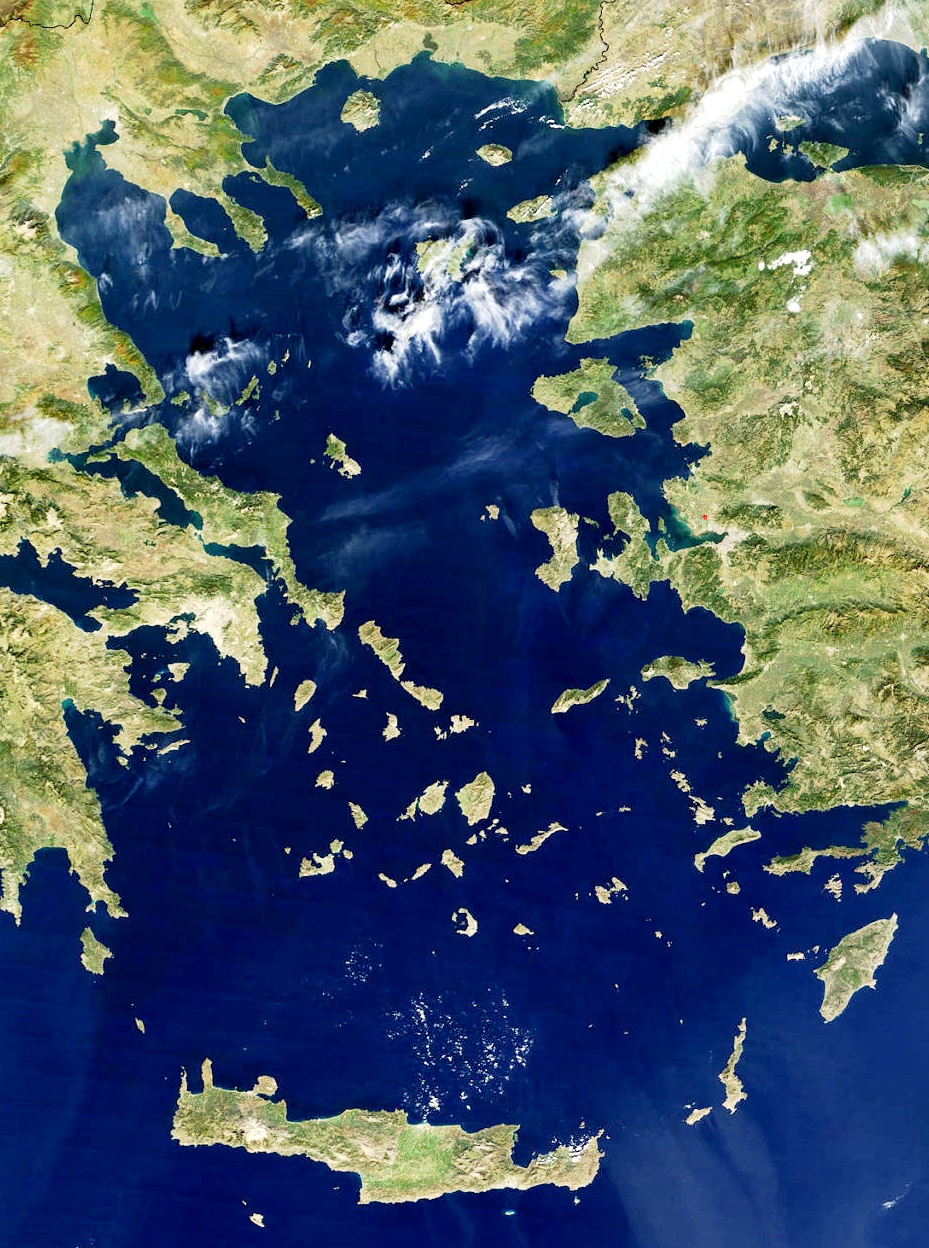
Satellite view of the Aegean Sea and islands

The Aegean Islands (Note: /iˈdʒiːən/, ih-JEE-ən; Greek: Νησιά Αιγαίου, romanized: Nisiá Aigaíou; Turkish: Ege Adaları) are the group of islands in the Aegean Sea, with mainland Greece to the west and north and Turkey to the east; the island of Crete delimits the sea to the south, those of Rhodes, Karpathos and Kasos to the southeast.

The ancient Greek name of the Aegean Sea, Archipelago (ἀρχιπέλαγος, archipelagos), was later applied to the islands it contains and is now used more generally, to refer to any island group. The vast majority of the Aegean Islands belong to Greece, being split among nine administrative regions. The only sizable possessions of Turkey in the Aegean Sea are Imbros (Gökçeada) and Tenedos (Bozcaada), in the northeastern part of the sea. Various smaller islets off Turkey's western coast are also under Turkish sovereignty. The islands have hot summers and mild winters, a hot-summer Mediterranean climate (Csa in the Köppen climate classification).

== Groups of islands ==
The Aegean Islands are traditionally subdivided into seven groups, from north to south:

- Northeastern Aegean Islands
- Euboea
- Sporades (Northern Sporades)
- Cyclades
- Saronic Islands
- Dodecanese (Southern Sporades)
- Crete

The term Italian Islands of the Aegean (Italian: Isole Italiane dell'Egeo) is sometimes used to refer to the Aegean Islands conquered by Italy during the Italo-Turkish War in 1912 and annexed (through the Treaty of Lausanne) from 1923 until 1947: the Dodecanese, including Rhodes and Kastellorizo. In the Treaty of Peace in 1947, these Italian-controlled islands were ceded to Greece.

== See also ==
- List of Aegean Islands
- List of islands of Greece
- List of islands of Turkey#Aegean Sea islands

== Sources ==
- Aegean Sea, The Columbia Encyclopedia, Sixth Edition. 2001–05.
