= Psathi, Ios =

Psathi Ψάθη
- Settlement
- Location within Greece
- Coordinates: 36°44′49″N 25°21′52″E
- Country: Greece
- Administrative region: South Aegean
- Regional unit: Thira
- Municipality: Ios

Area
  - Total: 0.08 km^{2} (0.031 sq mi)

Population (2021)
  - Total: 19
  - Density: 240/km^{2} (620/sq mi)
- Demonym: Psathianós (Ψαθιανός)
- Time zone: UTC+2 (EET)
  - Summer (DST): UTC+3 (EEST)
- Postal code: 840 01
- Area code: 22860

Psathi is a small settlement in Ios, Greece. It is located 8 km from Chora, the capital of Ios and 200 km from Athens.

== Archaeological significance ==
Map of the Archaeological Site

According to Government Gazette No.161 B of 1995, the location shown on the map is considered an archaeological site. That decision was taken to preserve the remains of two ancient temples where today, on top of them are built two churches, the remains of a Roman aqueduct, and the remains of an ancient, proto-Cycladic settlement and cemetery.
