= Oinousses =

Cluster of Greek islands

Oinousses Οινούσσες
- Municipality
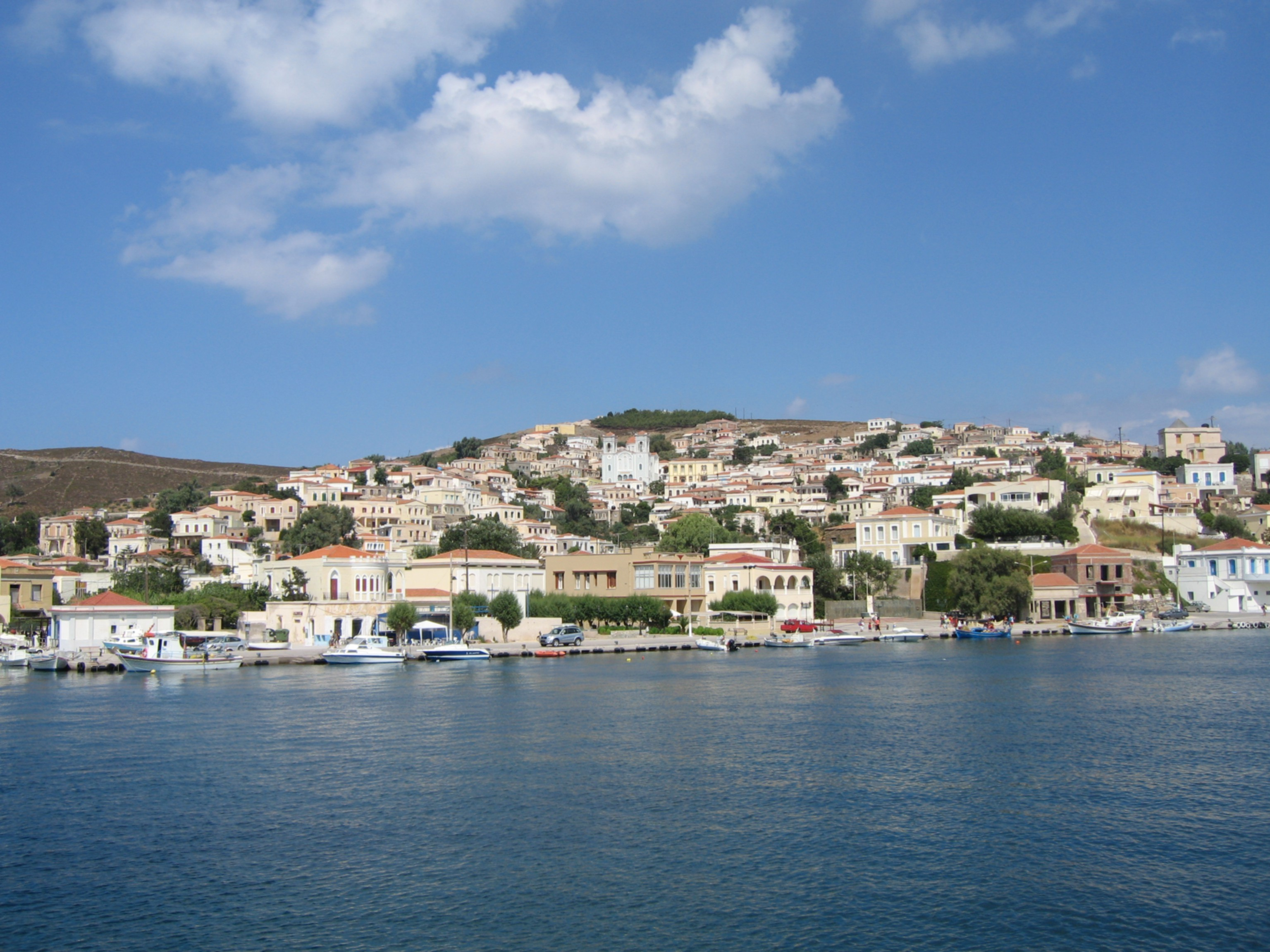
- Oinousses main settlement

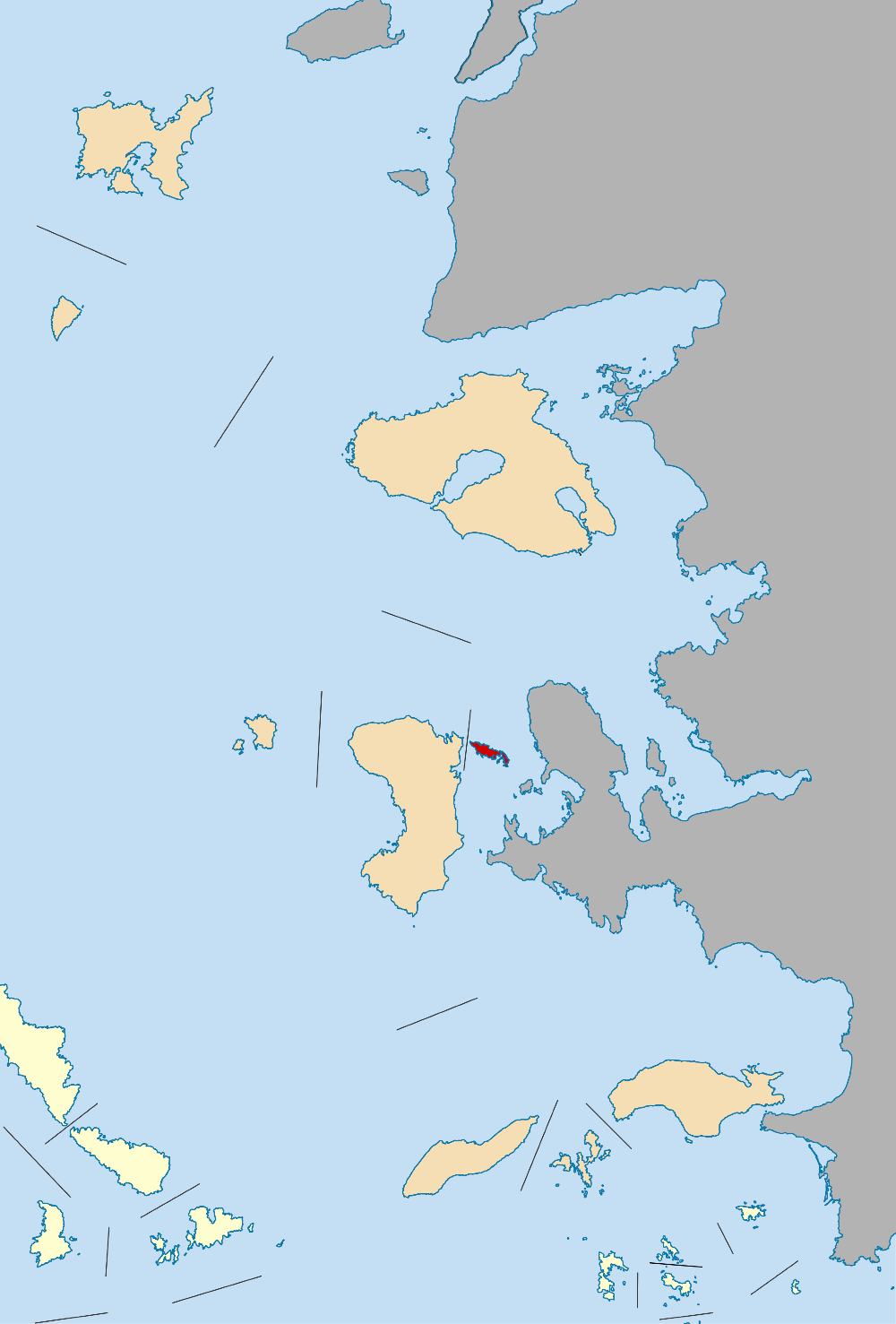

- Location within Greece
- Coordinates: 38°31′N 26°13′E
- Country: Greece
- Administrative region: North Aegean
- Regional unit: Chios

Area
  - Municipality: 17.427 km^{2} (6.729 sq mi)

Population (2021)
  - Municipality: 911
  - Density: 52.3/km^{2} (135/sq mi)
- Time zone: UTC+2 (EET)
  - Summer (DST): UTC+3 (EEST)
- Postal code: 821 01
- Area code: 22710
- Vehicle registration: ΧΙ

Oinousses (Greek: Οινούσσες, alternative forms: Aignousa (Αιγνούσα) or Egnousa (Εγνούσα)) is a barren cluster of 1 larger and 8 smaller islands some 2 kilometres (1 mile) off the north-east coast of the Greek island of Chios and 8 km (5 miles) west of Turkey. Administratively the islands form a municipality within the Chios regional unit, which is part of the North Aegean region. The principal town of the islands and seat of the municipality is also called Oinousses. Oinousses has a small resident population, living primarily in the island's town of Oinousses, and a recently built monastery. The town is centred on a square and a small port; it includes a school, several churches, a Naval high school and a maritime museum. The only other populated settlements are Kástron and Aspalathrókampos.

== Employment ==
The vast majority of the workforce of the island is engaged in seafaring, fishing and goat-herding.

The islands are noted as the origin of an unusual cluster of successful ship-owning families: the Lemos, Pateras, Hadjipateras, Samonas, Kollakis and Lyras families. Whilst most of the families now live elsewhere most of the year, the islands and town are well maintained with a strong naval connection. Oinoussians abroad are noted for their successful entrepreneurial skills in the industrial transportation industry. Although the number of Oinoussian ship operating companies has fallen since their heyday in the 1960s, they still maintain a formidable position in the industrial transportation industry.

== The islands of the complex ==
The Oinousses Complex comprises the below islands. The largest is Oinousses or Egnoussa (14.3 km^{2}), the second-largest is the islet Pasas or Panagia (2.5 km^{2}) and the third-largest is the islet of Vatos. The municipality has an area of 17.427 km^{2}.

- Oinousses or Egnoussa (Οινούσσες)
- Agios Panteleimon (Άγιος Παντελεήμων)
- Archontoniso (Αρχοντόνησο)
- Gadros (Γάδρος)
- Gaidouronisos (Γαϊδουρόνησος)
- Mallaropetra (Μαλλιαρόπετρα)
- Monaftis (Μονάφτης)
- Nisi Panagias (Νησί Παναγιάς)
- Nisi Pittas (Νησί Πίττας)
- Papapondikadiko (Παπαποντικάδικο)
- Pasas or Panagia (Πασάς)
- Pateroniso (Πατερόνησο)
- Pontikonisi (Ποντικονήσι)
- Prassonisia (Πρασονήσια)
- Santa Panagia (Σάντα Παναγιά)
- Vatos (Βάτος)

== Historical population ==
Year	Population
1981	705
1991	636
2001	1,050
2011	826
2021	911

== See also ==
- Battle of the Oinousses Islands in 1695 between the Ottoman Empire and the Republic of Venice
- List of settlements in the Chios regional unit
