= Thasopoula =

Greek islet in the Thracian Sea

Native name: Θασοπούλα
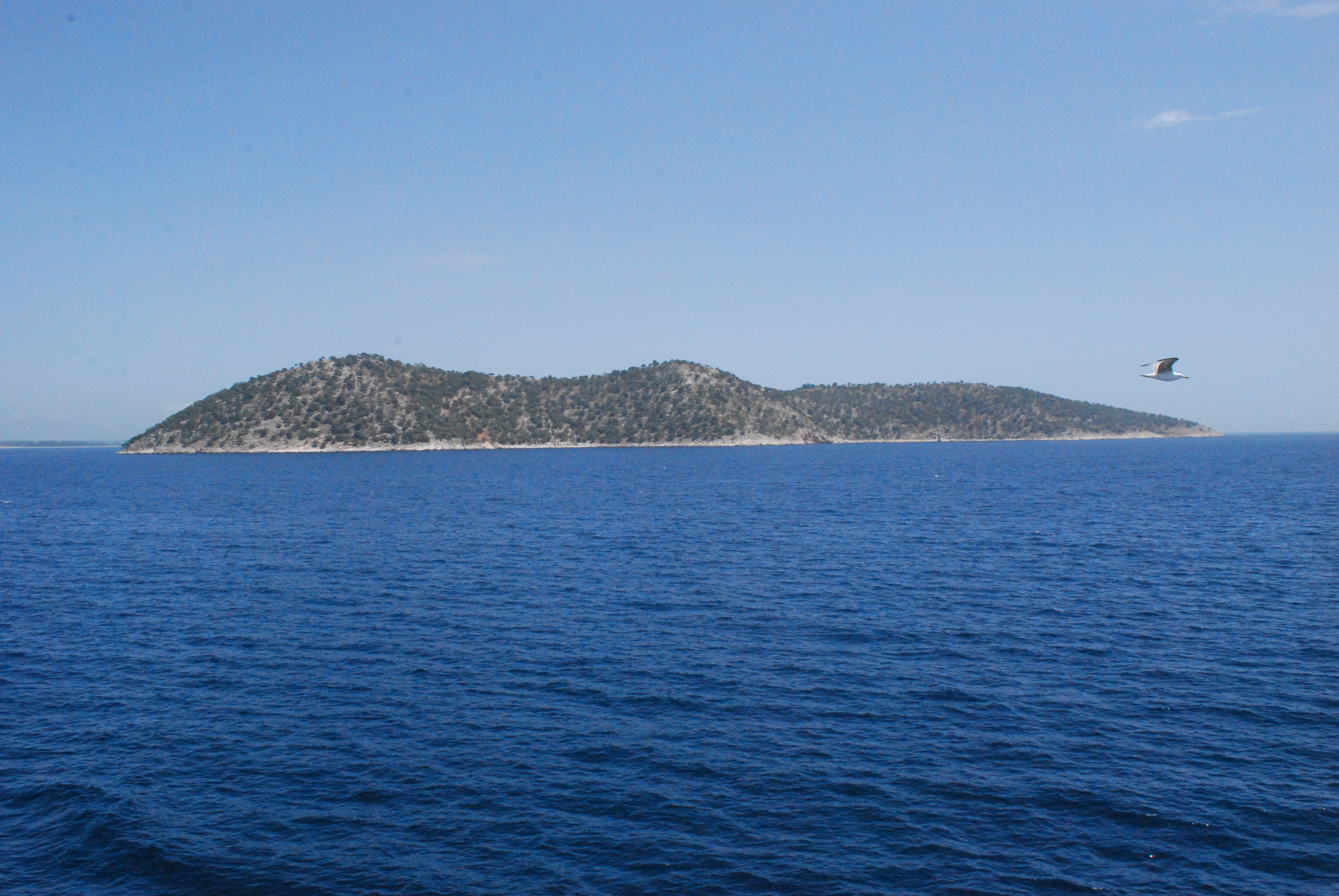
- The islet of Thasopoula

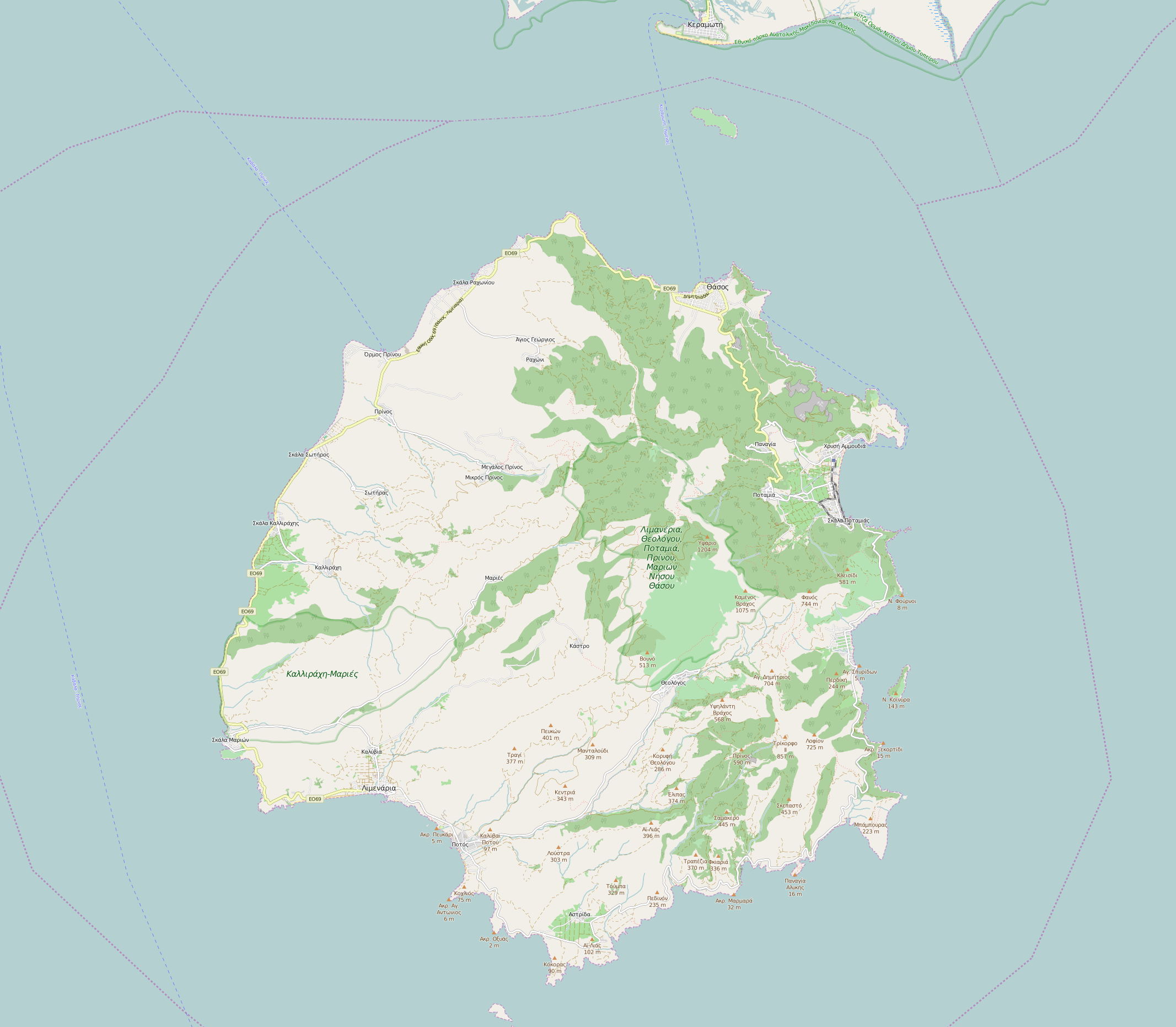
- Map of Thasos with Thasopoula to the north

Geography
- Location: Thracian Sea
- Coordinates: 40°49′42″N 24°42′33″E
- Area: 0,716 km^{2} (276 sq mi)
- Highest elevation: 111 m (364 ft)

Administration
- Greece
- Region: East Macedonia and Thrace
- Regional unit: Thasos
- Municipality: Thasos

Thasopoula (Greek: Θασοπούλα, romanized: Thasopoúla) is a rocky islet in northern Greece, in the Thracian Sea. It lies off the Nestos River delta, roughly in the middle of the eastern part of the Thasos channel, between Thasos and the coast of the Kavala regional unit. It has an area of 0.716 square kilometres, and its highest point reaches 111 metres. The islet is uninhabited. It is 15 nautical miles from Kavala and has three beautiful beaches.

There are colonies of gulls, ''Phalacrocorax carbo'' (cormorants), and herons in the area, and the islet is covered with Mediterranean maquis vegetation.

The Keramoti Winter Swimmers and Water Sports Association organizes an annual open-water race with a total distance of 2.4 kilometres, starting in Keramoti and finishing at Thasopoula.

Thasopoula is one of 30 small islands and islets that the Greek state plans to lease to private parties through the Hellenic Republic Asset Development Fund for a period of 50 years.

== Gallery ==
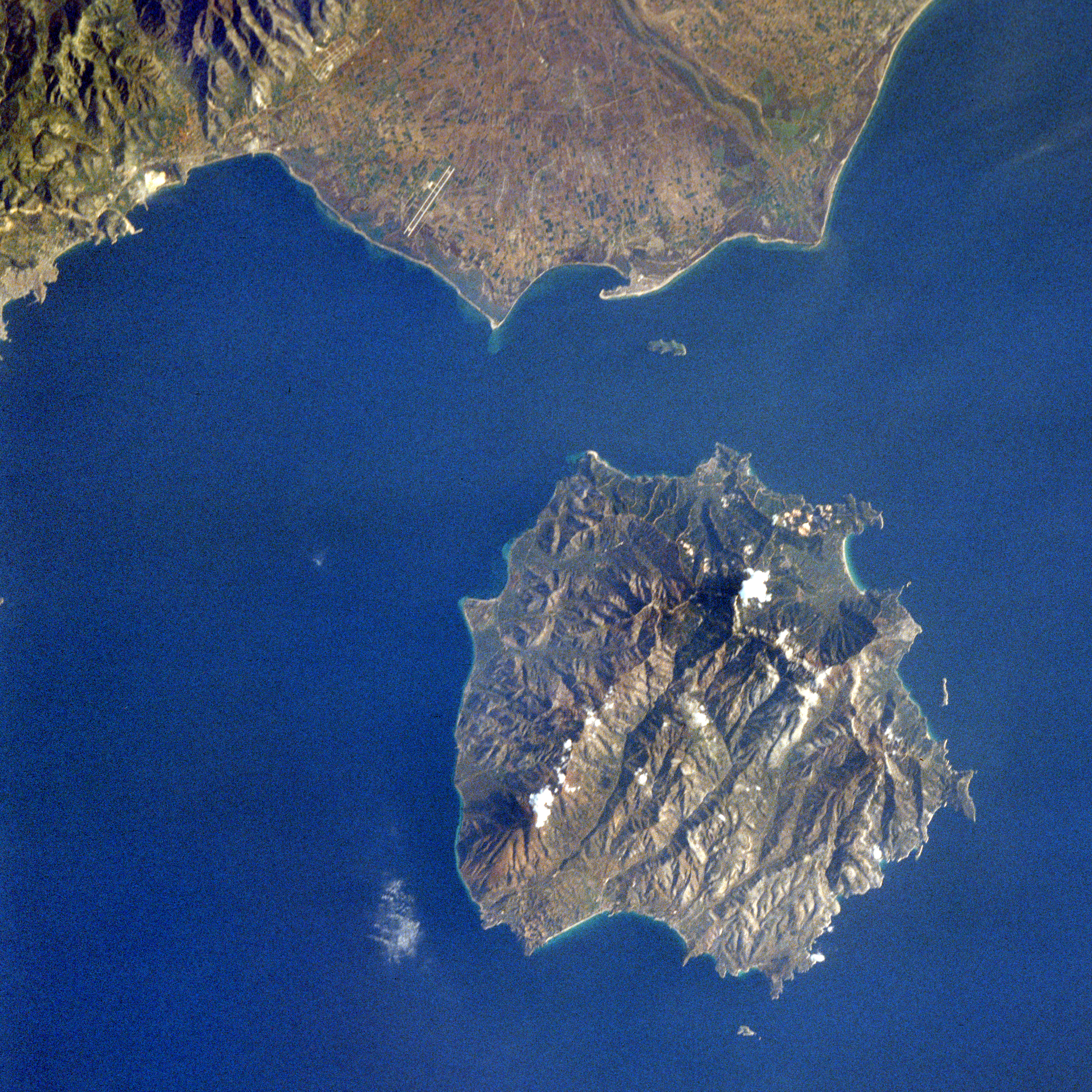
To the north–northeast of the island of Thasos lies the islet of Thasopoula

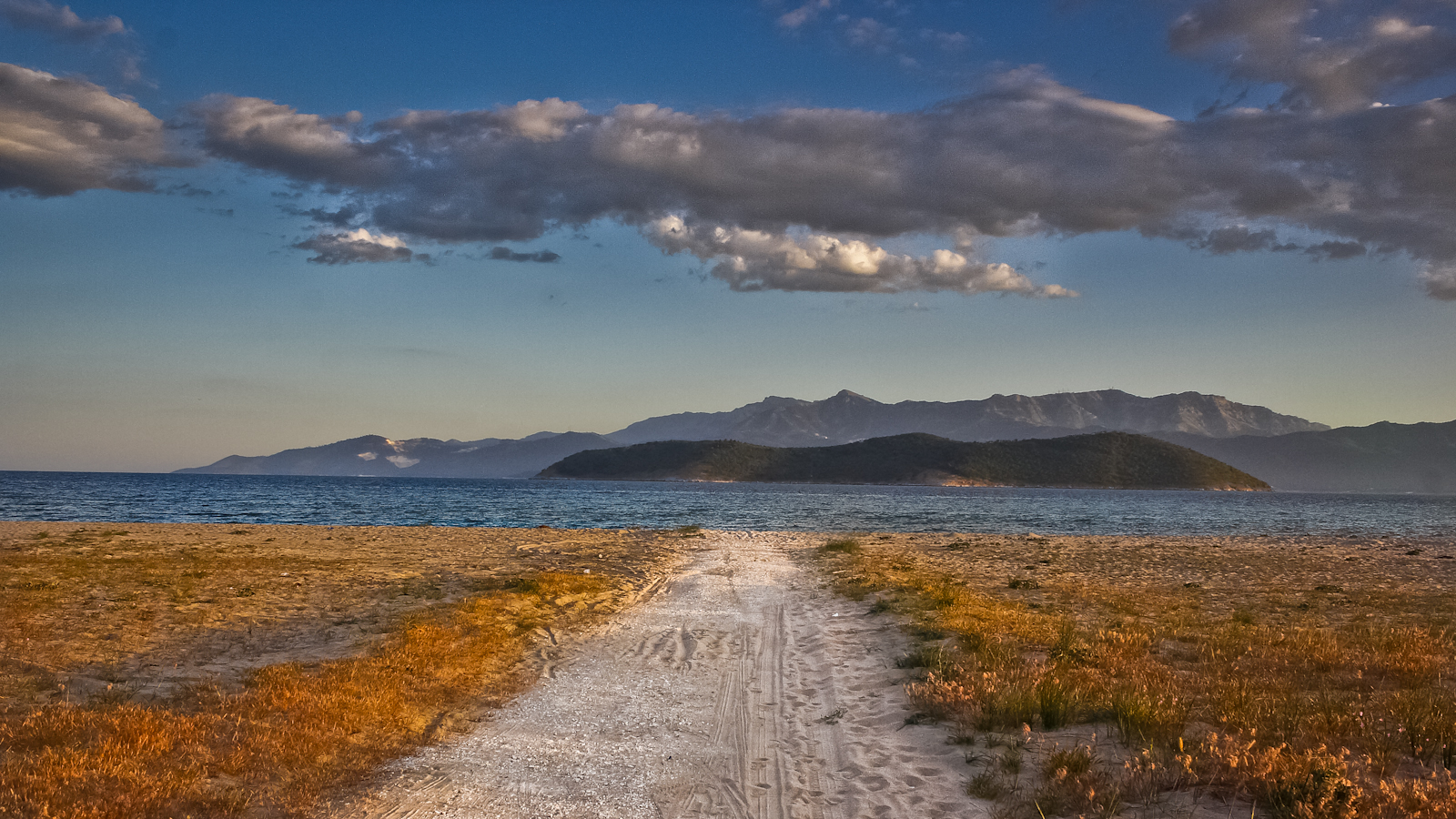
A view of Thasos from Keramoti
