= Zaforas =

Island in Greece

Coordinates: 36.0732°N 26.4005°E

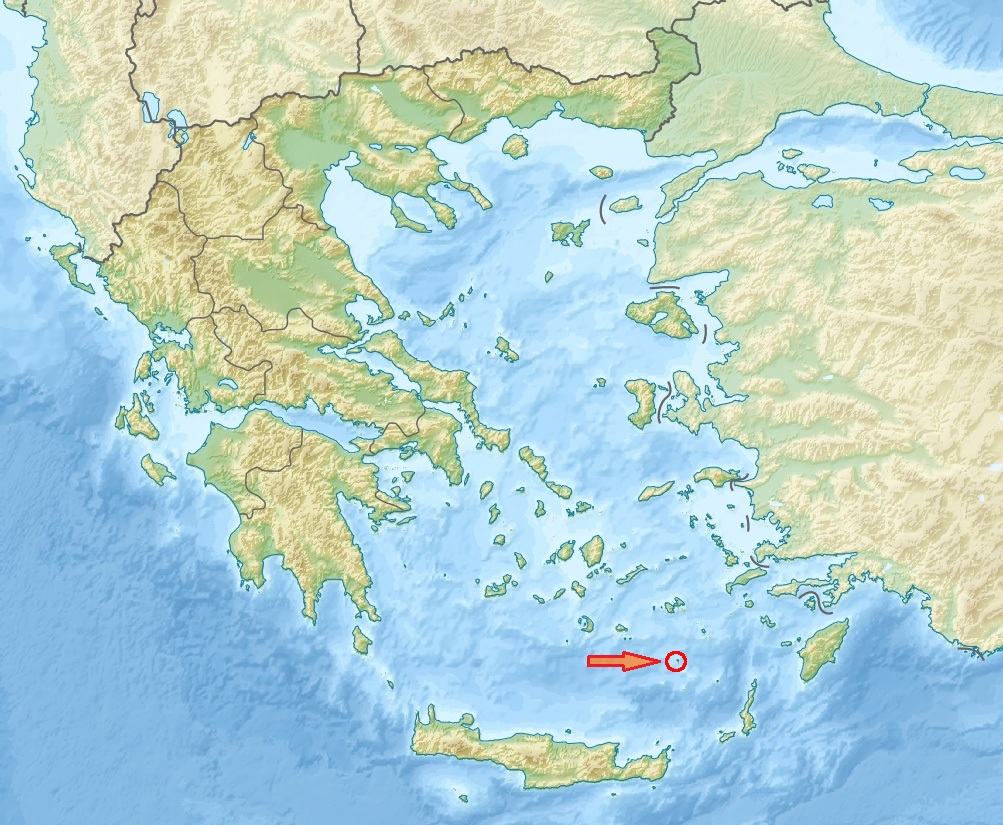
Location

Zaforas (Greek: Ζαφοράς) is a small Greek island in the southern part of the Dodecanese chain, about 40 kilometers (25 mi) south of the island Astypalaia. It has a population of 1 according to the Greek census of 2021.
