= Psathi, Cyprus =

Psathi Ψαθί
- Location in Cyprus
- Coordinates: 34°53′55″N 32°31′48″E
- Country: Cyprus
- District: Paphos District
- Elevation: 488 m (1,601 ft)

Population (2001)
  - Total: 98
- Time zone: UTC+2 (EET)
  - Summer (DST): UTC+3 (EEST)
- Postal code: 6300

Psathi (Greek: Ψαθί) is a village in the Paphos District of Cyprus, located 3 km west of Agios Dimitrianos. Psathi is located at 488m above sea level.

Built on a verdant hill overlooking the valley of Polis Chrysochous and at an altitude of 485 meters, Psathi is a small settlement with few houses that meet on both sides of the road that crosses it.

== Inhabitants ==
Here they are approximately 103 inhabitants.
