= Kimolos =

Greek island in the Aegean Sea

Kimolos Κίμωλος
- Municipality
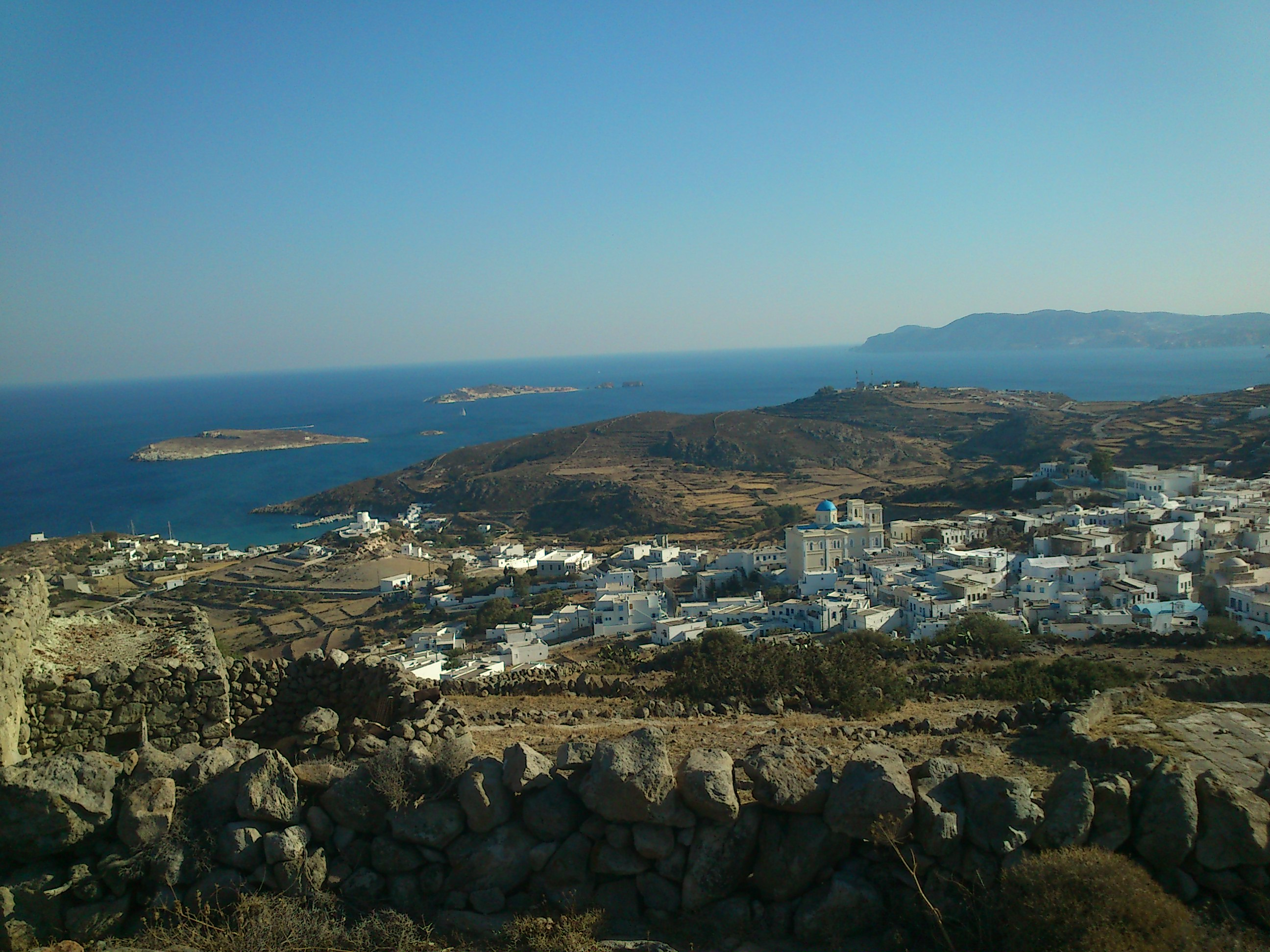
- Port of Kimolos

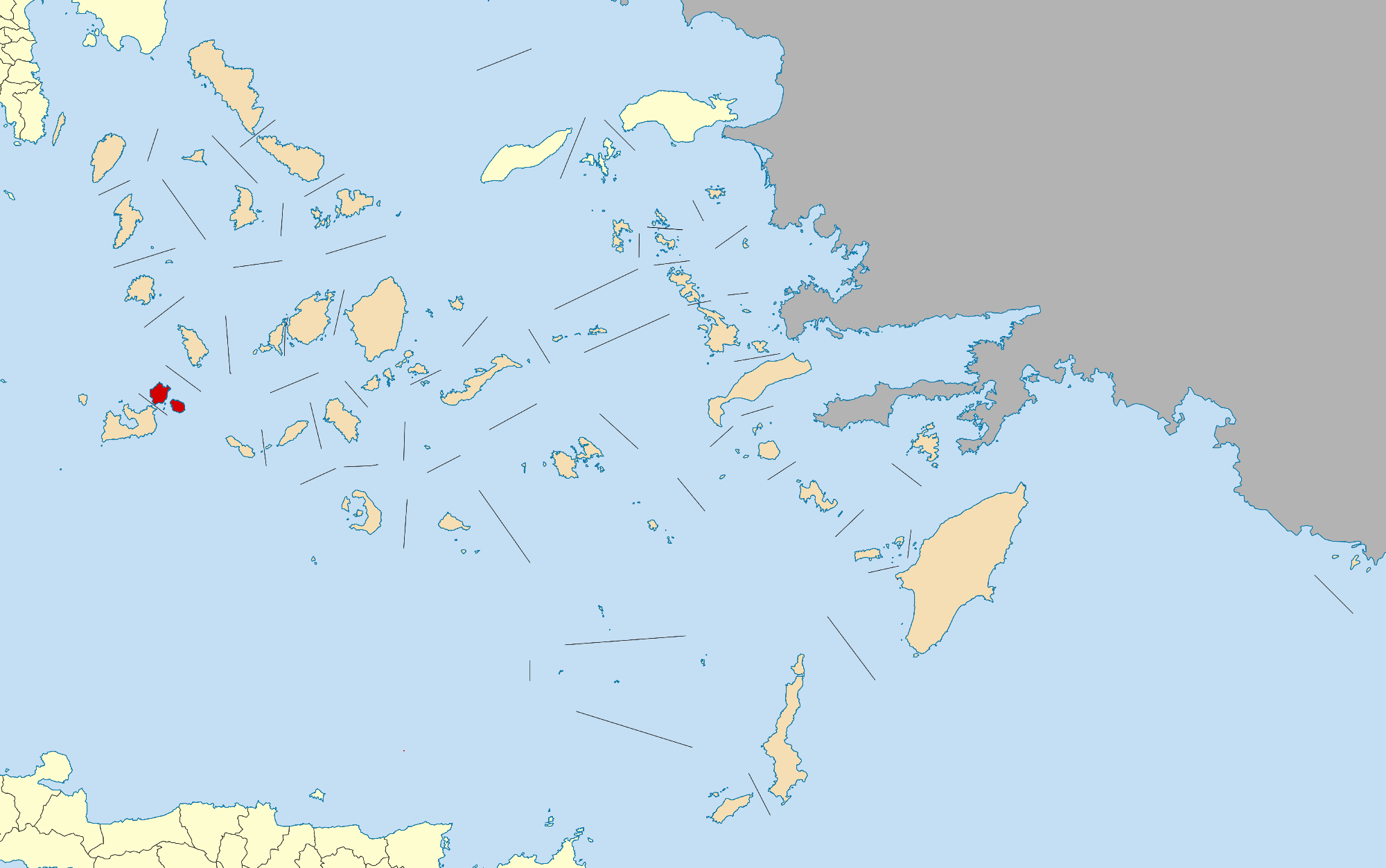

- Location within Greece
- Coordinates: 36°48′31″N 24°33′47″E
- Country: Greece
- Administrative region: South Aegean
- Regional unit: Milos

Area
  - Municipality: 53.3 km^{2} (20.6 sq mi)
- Highest elevation: 364 m (1,194 ft)
- Lowest elevation: 0 m (0 ft)

Population (2021)
  - Municipality: 810
  - Density: 15/km^{2} (39/sq mi)
- Time zone: UTC+2 (EET)
  - Summer (DST): UTC+3 (EEST)
- Postal code: 840 04
- Area code: 22870
- Vehicle registration: EM

Kimolos (Greek: Κίμωλος; Latin: Cimolus) is a Greek island in the Aegean Sea. It lies on the southwest of the island group of Cyclades, near the bigger island of Milos. Kimolos is the administrative center of the municipality of Kimolos, which also includes the uninhabited islands of Polyaigos, Agios Efstathios and Agios Georgios. The island has a land area of 36 square kilometres (13.900 sq mi), while the municipality's land area is 53.251 square kilometres (20.560 sq mi), and it reported a population of 810 inhabitants in the 2021 census.

== History ==
Kimolos is an island with rich history records. According to tradition, it is named after Kimolos, the very first resident of the island. Echinousa is also a recorded name of the island during ancient times, probably because of the snake Echidna (viper), being common even today on the island. Since the ancient era, it has been a battlefield between Ancient Athens, the ruler of the island, and Sparta, the ruler of Milos. In the Middle Ages it was known as Argentiera (Greek: Αρτζεντιέρα), because of the silver-colored rocky lands of its southern coast. Since those times, these rocky lands provided "Kimolia Gi" (Kimolian Earth), a valuable trade good, which made the island a major trade hub. It was ruled by the Ottoman Empire until 1829, when it was annexed by the Greek state along with the rest of the Cyclades.

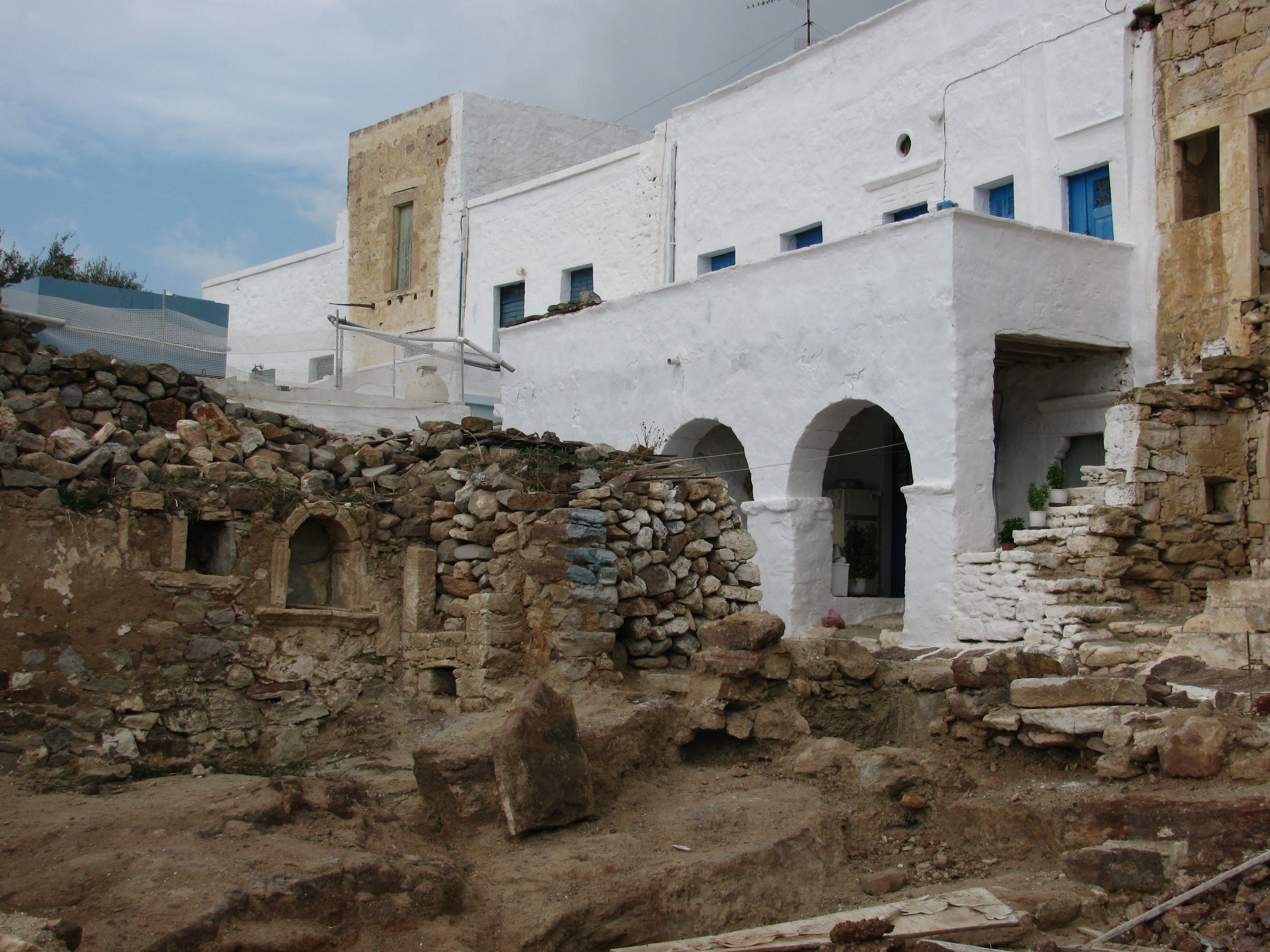
Inside the medieval castle

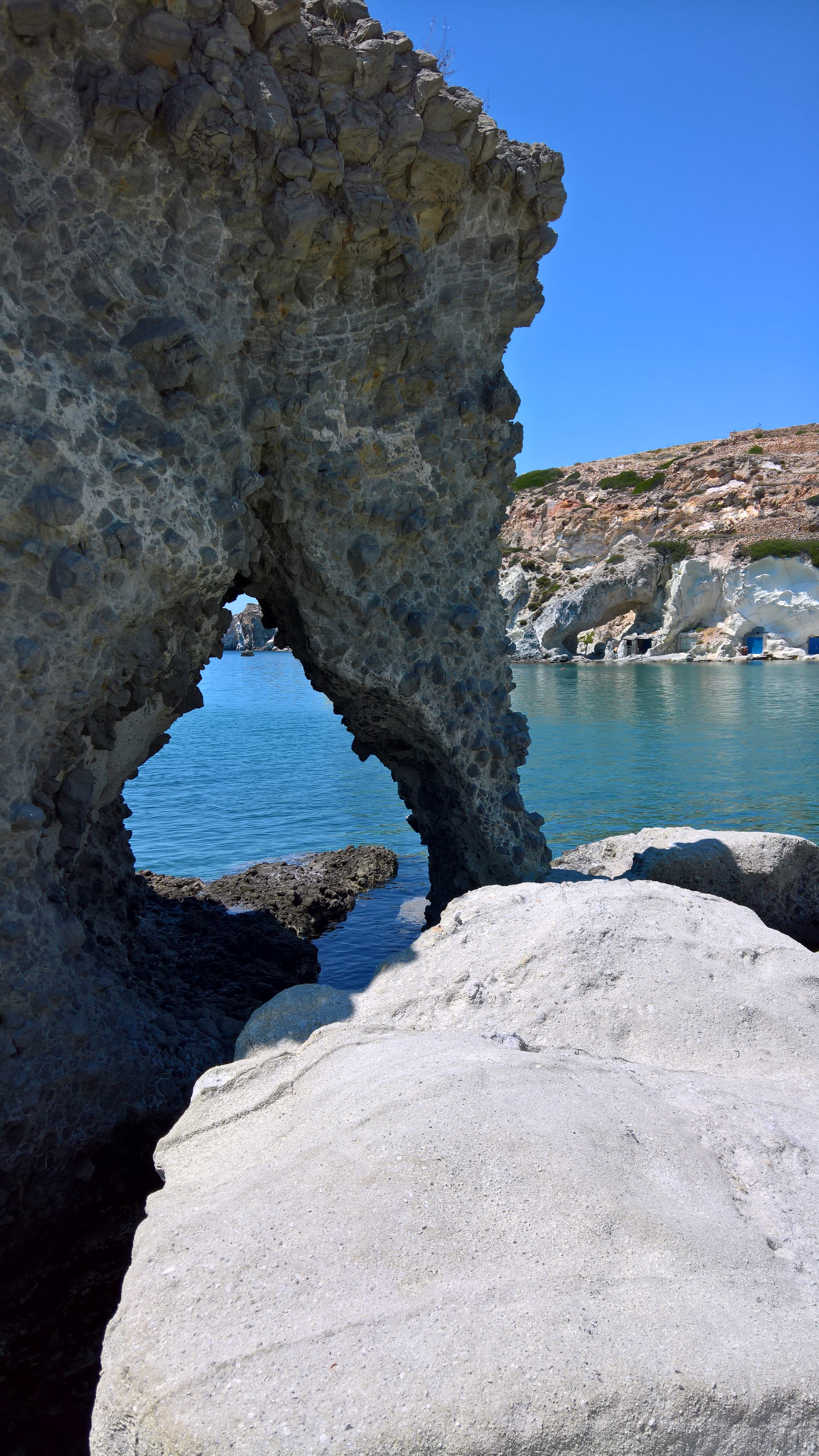

== Geography ==
Kimolos lies to the northeast of larger Milos island, separated from it by a 1 km wide channel. It is round-shaped, approximately 7 km in radius. The island has a total area of 36 square kilometres (14 sq mi). The highest point is mount Paleokastro, at 364 metres (1,194 feet) The main settlement is the Chorio, located on a hill on the south-east of the island. There are also smaller settlements of Psathi (port), Goupa, Kara, Prasa, Aliki, Bonatsa and Dekas.

To the east of Kimolos lies the island of Polyaigos, half its size. Polyaigos is the largest uninhabited island of Aegean. It is also part of the municipality of Kimolos.

== Geology ==
Kimolos, Milos and the smaller islands that surround them belong to the Aegean volcanic arc and consist mainly of acidic volcanic rocks. In some places, the pre-volcanic bedrock can be observed. Large areas of Kimolos are covered by tuffs and the volcanic activity can be obvious from the hot springs, existence of a notable geothermal field, the characteristic landscape and strange landforms. The island is also rich in minerals of the silica group and in significant industrial minerals.

Theodore Bent in December 1883 noted “a sort of white porous stone, easy to cut and much prized for building, for it hardens with time; it is the old 'terra Kimolia', out of which the ancients made Fuller's earth.”

One of the most famous geologic formations on Kimolos is Skiadi. Skiadi is a huge mushroom-shaped stone that dominates the middle of a small valley in the interior of the island. It is created by a process called ablation, in which the dust carried by the wind continuously scratches the rock, eroding the softer layers at the bottom much more than the harder layers at the top. Through centuries, the stone has been shaped into a characteristic, unique form.

== Residents ==
According to the last censuses, the population of Kimolos is decreasing, and no more than 600 residents (mostly elderly) remain during winter. The underage population is no more than 100, according to the school records. Most of the working population is involved with the tourist industry of the island (hotels, restaurants) in combination with agriculture activities, mainly during winter.

== Local government ==
After the municipal/prefectural elections held in October 2006, the mayor of the island for the period 2007-2010 was Theodoros-Gerasimos Maganiotis, who also publishes the only newspaper of the island, Kimoliaka Nea (Kimolian News). However, the current mayor of Kimolos is Ventouris Emanuel Konstantinos. Kimolos has a local Police Department. The Kimolos Port Authority is a department of Milos Coast Guard. Kimolos is part of the Milos regional unit.

== Transportation ==
Internal

On the island all vehicles are permitted, but during the summer months, the lack of parking space is the most important problem in populated areas, such as Chorio Kimolou and Psathi. Common kinds of fuels are available at the local fuel station. There are also public means of transport, such as bus and taxi, performing routes to popular beaches.

External

Kimolos belongs to the line of the Western Cyclades and it's connected to nearby islands and Piraeus port of Athens via year-round ferry boat and a catamaran ferry running only during the tourist season. Routes frequency varies with the season. During the tourist period, it usually has daily connection to Piraeus and other islands. Also, transport via Milos is possible, because of the frequent connection of the two islands with local ferry boat. Finally, Kimolos is a station for the local connections between Cyclades islands.

== People ==
- Kimon Digenis, military officer

== See also ==
- List of islands of Greece
