= Milos (regional unit) =

Milos Περιφερειακή ενότητα Μήλου
- Regional unit
- Municipalities of the Cyclades

- Milos within Greece

- Location within Greece
- Coordinates: 36°35′N 24°25′E
- Country: Greece
- Administrative region: South Aegean

Area
  - Total: 362.5 km^{2} (140.0 sq mi)

Population (2021)
  - Total: 10,130
  - Density: 27.94/km^{2} (72.38/sq mi)
- Time zone: UTC+2 (EET)
  - Summer (DST): UTC+3 (EEST)

Milos (Greek: Περιφερειακή ενότητα Μήλου) is one of the regional units of Greece. It is part of the region of South Aegean. The regional unit covers the islands of Kimolos, Milos, Serifos, Sifnos and several smaller islands in the Aegean Sea.

== Administration ==
As a part of the 2011 Kallikratis government reform, the Milos regional unit was created out of part of the former Cyclades Prefecture. It is subdivided into 4 municipalities. These are (number as in the map in the infobox):

- Kimolos (9)
- Milos (11)
- Serifos (15)
- Sifnos (17)

== Province ==
The province of Milos (Greek: Επαρχία Μήλου) was one of the provinces of the Cyclades Prefecture. It had the same territory as the present regional unit. It was abolished in 2006.
