= Sacred snakes of Cephalonia =

Religious ceremony in Greece

The sacred snakes of Cephalonia are celebrated annually on 15 August (the Feast of the Dormition) on Cephalonia, the largest of the Ionian Islands in Western Greece.

== History ==
The sacred snakes are celebrated in the Church of the Theotokos ("Mother of God"), where they are said to appear annually for the celebration of the Dormition of the Mother of God, when in the Eastern Orthodox, Oriental Orthodox and Eastern Catholic Churches commemorate the "falling asleep" or death of Mary, mother of Jesus, and her bodily resurrection before being taken up into heaven.

== Doubts ==
Daniel Ogden argues in Drakon: Dragon Myth and Serpent Cult in the Greek and Roman Worlds (2013) that "old myth and modern tourist disinformation" make it difficult to establish history and fact.
