= Arginia =

Arginia Αργίνια
- Community
- Location within Greece
- Coordinates: 38°6′N 20°43′E
- Country: Greece
- Administrative region: Ionian Islands
- Regional unit: Kefalonia
- Municipality: Argostoli
- Municipal unit: Eleios-Pronnoi

Population (2021)
  - Community: 21
- Time zone: UTC+2 (EET)
  - Summer (DST): UTC+3 (EEST)

Arginia (Greek: Αργίνια) is a small village in the southern part of the island of Kefalonia, Greece. In 2011 its population was 15. It is situated on the southeastern slope of the Mount Ainos, at about 550 m elevation. It is 2 km north of Valerianos, 3 km west of Pastra, 8 km southwest of Poros and 22 km southeast of Argostoli. Arginia was devastated by the 1953 Ionian earthquake.

== Population ==
| Year | Population |
|---|---|
| 1981 | 38 |
| 1991 | 26 |
| 2001 | 39 |
| 2011 | 15 |
| 2021 | 21 |

== See also ==
- List of settlements in Cephalonia
