= Michata =

Michata Μιχάτα
- Settlement
- Location within Greece
- Coordinates: 38°10′N 20°36′E
- Country: Greece
- Administrative region: Ionian Islands
- Regional unit: Kefalonia
- Municipality: Argostoli
- Municipal unit: Omala
- Community: Omala
- Elevation: 480 m (1,570 ft)

Population (2021)
  - Total: 25
- Time zone: UTC+2 (EET)
  - Summer (DST): UTC+3 (EEST)
- Postal code: 281 00
- Area code: 26710
- Vehicle registration: KE

Michata (Greek: Μιχάτα) is a village in the municipal unit of Omala on the island of Kefalonia, Greece. It is situated on a hillside at the western foot of Mount Ainos. It is 1 km north of Epanochori, 1 km southeast of Valsamata and 10 km east of Argostoli. The village was severely damaged by the 1953 Ionian earthquake.

== Historical population ==
Year	Population
1991	24
2001	27
2011	25
2021	25

== See also ==
- List of settlements in Cephalonia
