= Mavrata =

Mavrata Μαυράτα
- Community
- Location within Greece
- Coordinates: 38°4.3′N 20°43.6′E
- Country: Greece
- Administrative region: Ionian Islands
- Regional unit: Kefalonia
- Municipality: Argostoli
- Municipal unit: Eleios-Pronnoi

Population (2021)
  - Community: 120
- Time zone: UTC+2 (EET)
  - Summer (DST): UTC+3 (EEST)

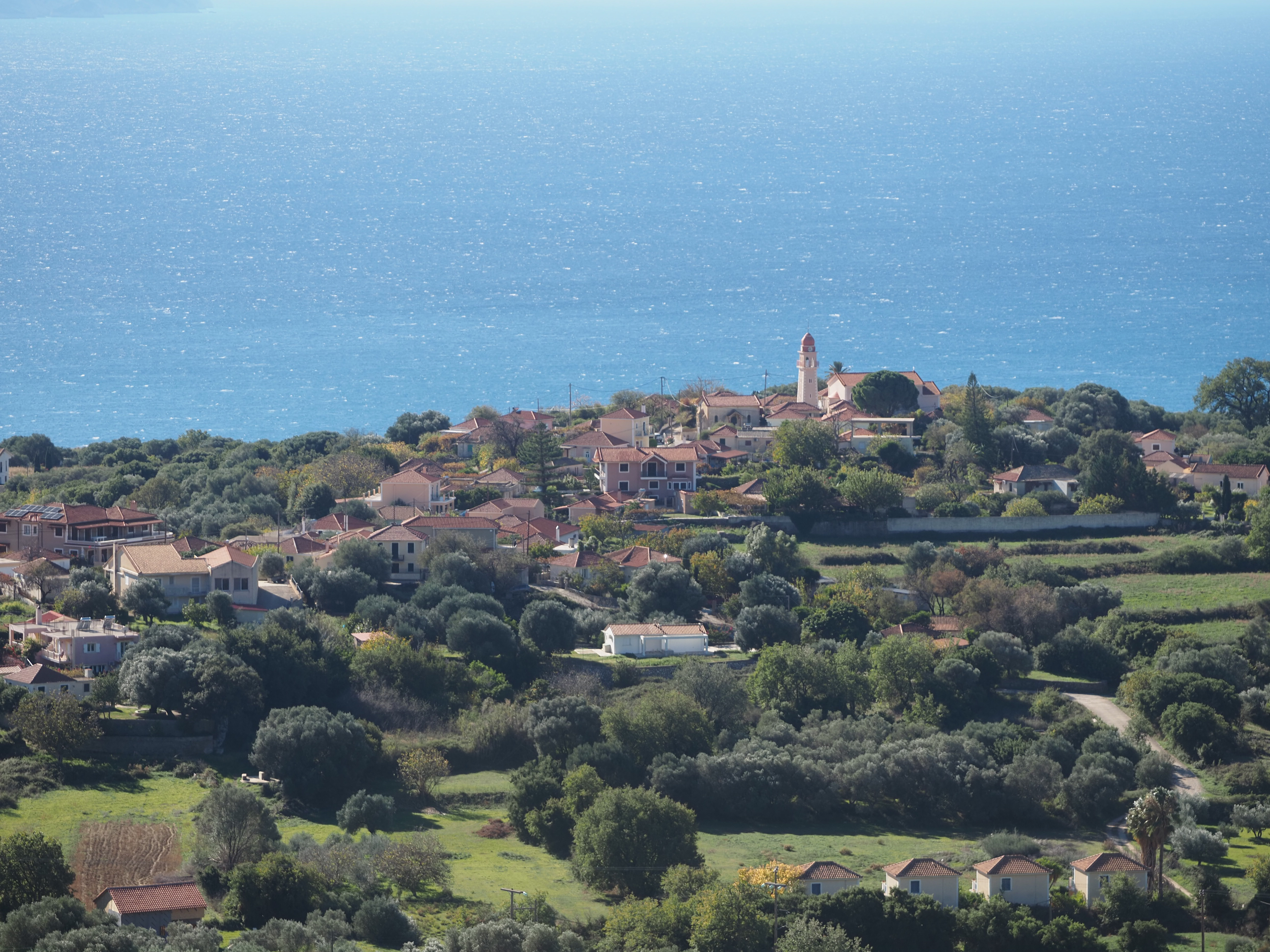

Mavrata (Greek: Μαυράτα) is a village in the municipal unit of Eleios-Pronnoi, in the southeastern part of the island of Cephalonia, Greece. In 2011 its population was 139. It is situated on a hill above the Ionian Sea coast, at about 180 m elevation. It is 1 km south of Chionata, 3 km southwest of Pastra and 10 km southwest of Poros. It was devastated by the 1953 Ionian earthquake.

== Population ==
Year	Population
1981	143
1991	109
2001	159
2011	139
2021	120

== See also ==
- List of settlements in Cephalonia
