= Digaleto =

Digaleto Διγαλέτο
- Community
- Location within Greece
- Coordinates: 38°10′30″N 20°40′53″E
- Country: Greece
- Administrative region: Ionian Islands
- Regional unit: Cephalonia
- Municipality: Sami
- Municipal unit: Sami

Population (2021)
  - Community: 348
- Time zone: UTC+2 (EET)
  - Summer (DST): UTC+3 (EEST)

Digaleto (Greek: Διγαλέτο) is a village in the municipal unit of Sami, on the island of Kefalonia, Greece. It is situated in the saddle between the mountains Ainos and Merovougli, at 540 m elevation. It is 3 km northwest of Agios Nikolaos, 9 km east of Valsamata, 9 km northwest of Poros, 9 km southeast of Sami and 17 km east of Argostoli. The road from Sami to Poros passes through the village.

== Population ==
Historical population
Year	Pop.	±%
1991	418	—
2001	490	+17.2%
2011	316	−35.5%
2021	348	+10.1%

== See also ==
- List of settlements in Cephalonia
