= Valerianos =

Valerianos Βαλεριάνος
- Community
- Location within Greece
- Coordinates: 38°5′N 20°43′E
- Country: Greece
- Administrative region: Ionian Islands
- Regional unit: Kefalonia
- Municipality: Argostoli
- Municipal unit: Eleios-Pronnoi

Population (2021)
  - Community: 284
- Time zone: UTC+2 (EET)
  - Summer (DST): UTC+3 (EEST)

Valerianos (Greek: Βαλεριάνος) is a village and a community in the island of Cephalonia, Greece. The community includes the villages Atsoupades and Plateies. It is situated at the southeastern foot of Mount Ainos, at about 190 m elevation. It is 0.5 km northwest of Chionata, 3 km southwest of Pastra, 9 km southwest of Poros and 23 km southeast of Argostoli. Valerianos was devastated by the 1953 Ionian earthquake.

== Population ==
Year	Population village	Population community
1981	-	254
1991	142	-
2001	150	262
2011	154	302
2021	132	284

== Notable people ==
- Juan de Fuca (1536–1602), Greek maritime pilot in the service of the Spanish king Philip II

== See also ==
- List of settlements in Cephalonia
