= Agios Nikolaos, Cephalonia =

Agios Nikolaos Άγιος Νικόλαος
- Community
- Location within Greece
- Coordinates: 38°10′N 20°43′E
- Country: Greece
- Administrative region: Ionian Islands
- Regional unit: Cephalonia
- Municipality: Argostoli
- Municipal unit: Eleios-Pronnoi

Population (2021)
  - Community: 82
- Time zone: UTC+2 (EET)
  - Summer (DST): UTC+3 (EEST)

Agios Nikolaos (Greek: Άγιος Νικόλαος) is a village in the municipal unit of Eleios-Pronnoi on the island Cephalonia, Greece. It is situated in an inland valley, at 280 m elevation. It is 3 km southeast of Digaleto, 4 km north of Xenopoulo, 6 km northwest of Poros and 20 km east of Argostoli. The road from Poros to Sami passes through the village. Agios Nikolaos suffered great damage from the 1953 Ionian earthquake. The village has an elementary school and a church dedicated to Saint Gerasimos.

== Population ==
Historical population
Year	Pop.	±%
1991	170	—
2001	155	−8.8%
2011	96	−38.1%
2021	82	−14.6%

== See also ==
- List of settlements in Cephalonia
