= Chionata =

Chionata Χιονάτα
- Community
- Location within Greece
- Coordinates: 38°4.8′N 20°43.4′E
- Country: Greece
- Administrative region: Ionian Islands
- Regional unit: Kefalonia
- Municipality: Argostoli
- Municipal unit: Eleios-Pronnoi

Population (2021)
  - Community: 151
- Time zone: UTC+2 (EET)
  - Summer (DST): UTC+3 (EEST)

Chionata (Greek: Χιονάτα) is a village and a community in the southeastern part of the island of Cephalonia, Greece. It is situated in the plain between the southeastern slope of Mount Ainos and the Ionian Sea coast. The community includes the villages Kolaitis and Thiramonas. Chionata is 0.5 kilometres (0.3 mi) southeast of Valerianos, 1 kilometre (0.6 mi) west of Markopoulo and 9 kilometres (6 mi) southwest of Poros. It was devastated by the 1953 Ionian earthquake.

== Population ==
Year	Population village	Population community
1981	-	217
1991	49	-
2001	53	170
2011	63	154
2021	70	151

== See also ==
- List of settlements in Cephalonia
