= Andriolata =

Andriolata Ανδριολάτα
- Settlement
- Location within Greece
- Coordinates: 38°8.9′N 20°43.6′E
- Country: Greece
- Administrative region: Ionian Islands
- Regional unit: Kefalonia
- Municipality: Argostoli
- Municipal unit: Eleios-Pronnoi
- Community: Xenopoulo

Population (2021)
  - Total: 8
- Time zone: UTC+2 (EET)
  - Summer (DST): UTC+3 (EEST)

Andriolata, (Greek: Ανδριολάτα) is a settlement in the island of Kefalonia, Greece. It is part of the local community of Xenopoulo and the municipal unit of Eleios-Pronnoi. In 2021 its population was 8. It is situated 1.5 km north of Xenopoulo, 4 km west of Poros and 21 km east of Argostoli. It was part of the independent community of Xenopoulo between 1912 and 1997, when it became part of the municipality Eleios-Pronnoi.

== Population ==
Year	Population
1991	32
2001	30
2011	8
2021	8

== See also ==
- List of settlements in Cephalonia
