= Tzanata =

Tzanata Τζανάτα
- Settlement
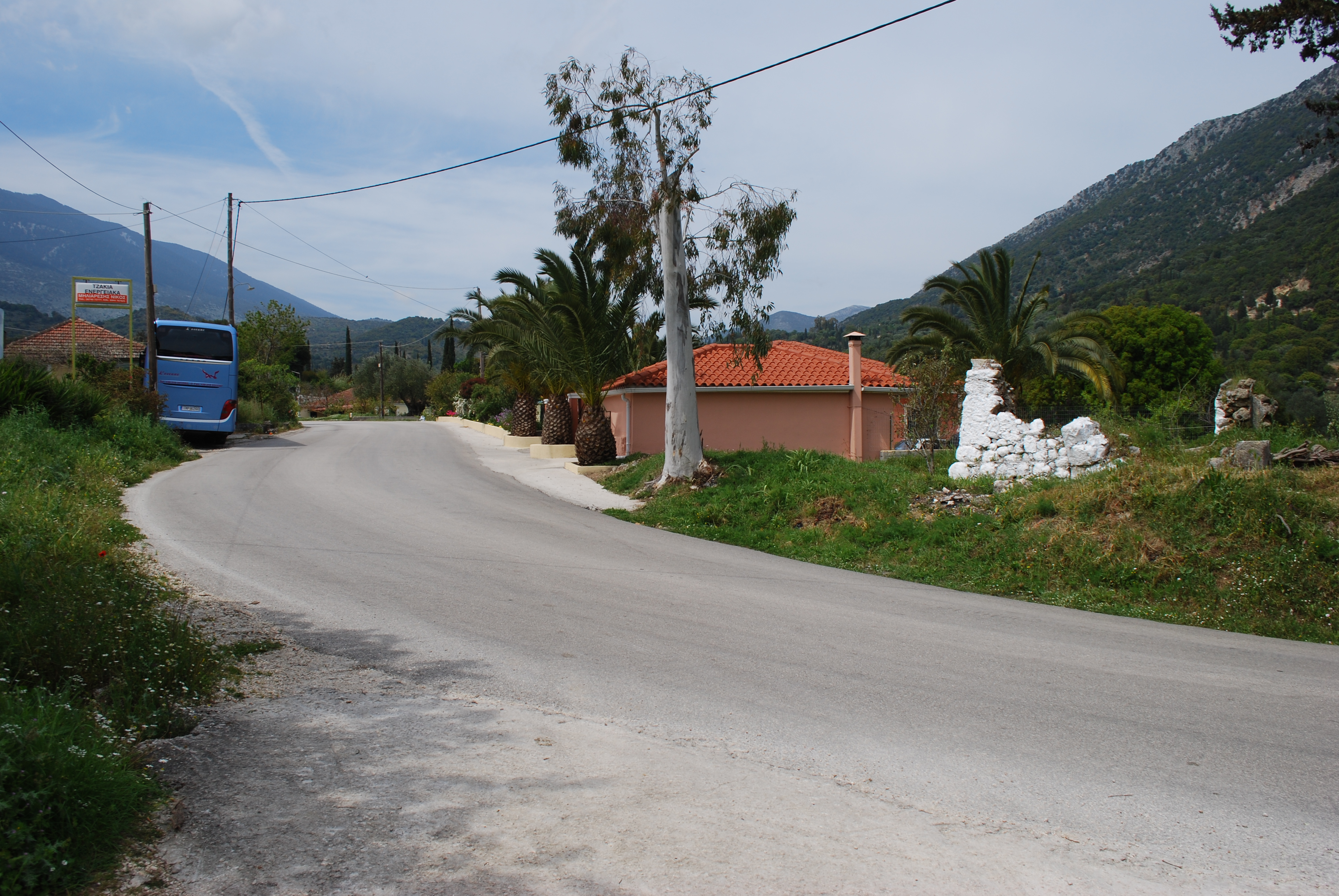
- Tzanata in 2014

- Location within Greece
- Coordinates: 38°8.5′N 20°45′E
- Country: Greece
- Administrative region: Ionian Islands
- Regional unit: Kefalonia
- Municipality: Argostoli
- Municipal unit: Eleios-Pronnoi
- Community: Poros
- Elevation: 60 m (200 ft)

Population (2021)
  - Total: 159
- Time zone: UTC+2 (EET)
  - Summer (DST): UTC+3 (EEST)
- Postal code: 280 86
- Area code: 26740

Tzanata (Greek: Τζανάτα) is an inland village in the southeast of Kefalonia, one of the Ionian Islands of Greece. It is part of the community of Poros within the Eleios-Pronnoi municipal unit. It is situated 3 km southwest of Poros, 25 km southeast of Sami and 36 km east of Argostoli.

Along with the neighbouring villages of Agia Eirini and Kampitsata, it is situated in a fertile plain south of the Atros hill. The village has a small school, community centre and community clinic; a sports stadium to serve the local area is slowly being completed. A mineral water spring (vrysi) fed from the ‘bottomless’ Avithos lake at Agios Nikolaos feeds a fountain in the plane tree sheltered square where the village festivals, served by souvlaki stalls and the adjacent taverna, are held in the summer months. Water from the surrounding mountains also feeds two reservoirs just outside the village, one completed in 2005 to feed the burgeoning summer demands of nearby Skala.

In 1991 archaeologist Lazaros Kolonas, excavating in the Broutzi area of Tzanata, discovered a tholos (beehive) tomb from the Mycenaean period measuring 6.80 meters in diameter. Some claim that it is the burial place of Odysseus; others believe it to be the tomb of earlier royalty, circa 1400 BC. It is the most important historical find on Kefalonia to date. The site is signposted from the Tzanata-Poros road.

As the road to Poros enters the impressive Poros gorge, there is a rough vehicular track leading 4.5 km to Atros, the oldest monastery and surviving structure on Kefalonia.

== Transport ==
The Argostoli – Poros bus serves it, but runs infrequently.

== Population ==
Historical population
Year	Pop.	±%
1991	188	—
2001	158	−16.0%
2011	159	+0.6%
2021	159	+0.0%

== See also ==
- List of settlements in Cephalonia
