= Markopoulo, Cephalonia =

Markopoulo Μαρκόπουλο
- Community
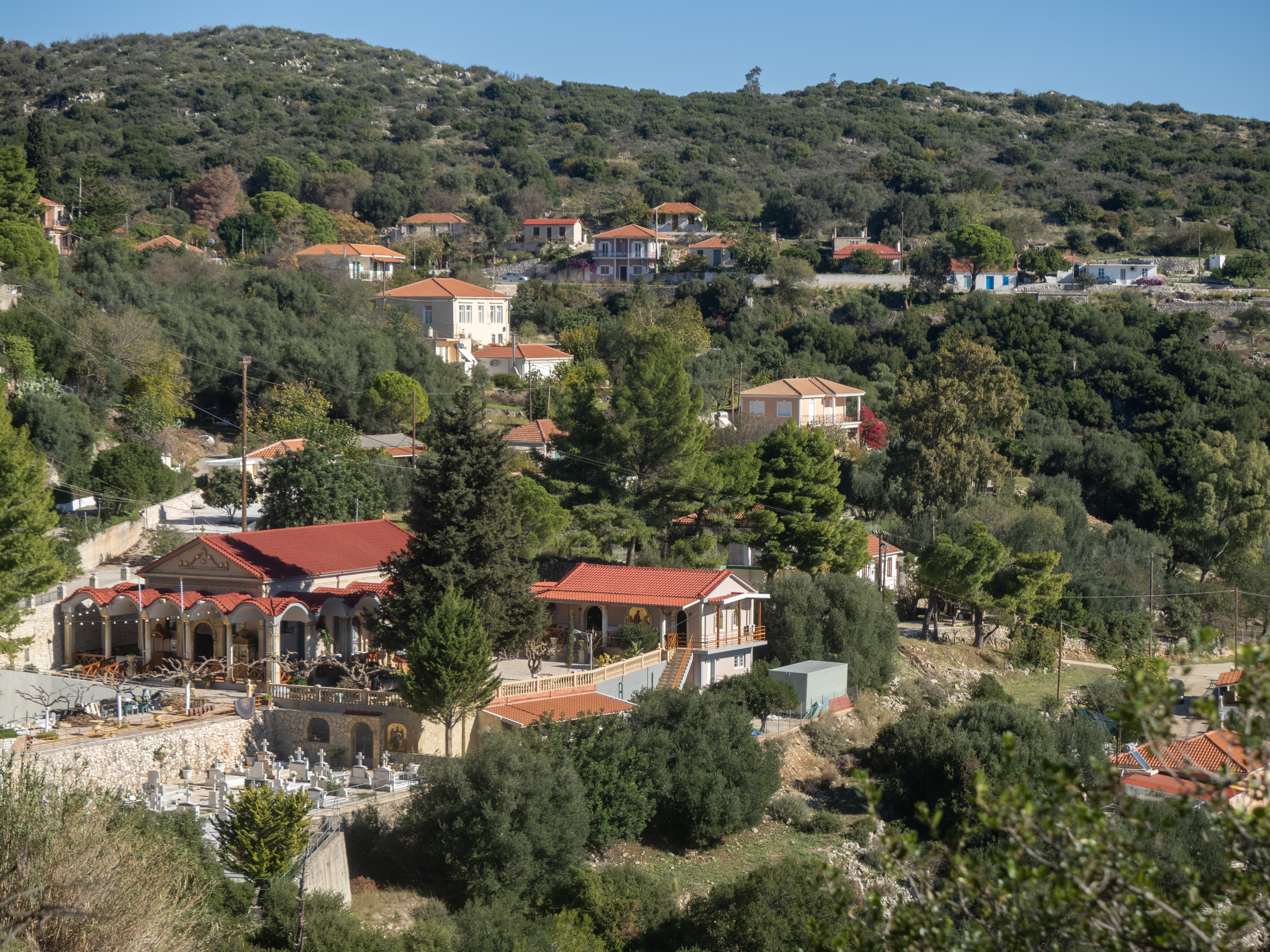

- Location within Greece
- Coordinates: 38°5′N 20°44′E
- Country: Greece
- Administrative region: Ionian Islands
- Regional unit: Cephalonia
- Municipality: Argostoli
- Municipal unit: Eleios-Pronnoi

Population (2021)
  - Community: 254
- Time zone: UTC+2 (EET)
  - Summer (DST): UTC+3 (EEST)

Markopoulo (Greek: Μαρκόπουλο) is a village and a community in the southeastern part of the island of Cephalonia, Greece. It is situated at the southeastern foot of Mount Ainos, at about 250 m elevation. The community consists of the villages Markopoulo, Kateleios and the beach village Kato Kateleios. Markopoulo is located 1 km east of Chionata, 2 km west of Kateleios, 2 km northwest of Kato Kateleios, 6 km west of Skala and 9 km southwest of Poros.

== Historical population ==
Year	Population village	Population community
1981	175	-
1991	81	-
2001	90	272
2011	85	277
2021	76	254

== History, agriculture, tourism ==
Stone Age remains have been found nearby in the Sakkos cave, in Skala and in the Mounda Bay area. At nearby Mavrata there is a tomb from the Mycenaean period while Roman remains visible just behind the main Agia Barbara beach indicate settlement in Kateleios over 2000 years ago. Although Mounda Bay is very shallow there is also some evidence that Kateleios was a port and trading centre during the Venetian period, witnessed by the remains of an old pier or mole in the bay.

Like virtually all of Kefalonia (except the Fiskardo area), the villages were destroyed during the 1953 Ionian earthquake and have been rebuilt since. Remains of the old church bell-tower exist in Kateleios. Until quite recently Kato Kateleios was a small collection of fishermen's houses and huts, some of which are still inhabited, and the main town was further up in the valley, at Ano Katelios. Tourism development in recent years saw the construction of restaurants, homes, and rented apartments near the sea-front, which is now considered to be the main settlement of Katelios.

The bay of Katelios is a designated marine Natura 2000 site. Due to the shallow waters of the bay and the scattered reef outcrops, the flow of sea water is slower than surrounding waters, making it an ideal habitat for the protected sea grass Posidonia oceanica, which occupies a significant portion of the bay. The beach of Mounda, on the east of the bay and at a short distance from Katelios is a nesting area for the Loggerhead turtles (Caretta caretta). Sea turtle nests in this area have been monitored and protected since 1988, while an environmental station operates at the town's old school.

Katelios is the only area on the island of Kefalonia with a river that has water flowing throughout the year. The small river flows from the hills around the area of Pastra. Until the middle 19th century, water mills were in regular use, and their remnants can still be seen between Pastra and Katelios.

== See also ==
- List of settlements in Cephalonia
