= Xenopoulo =

Xenopoulo Ξενόπουλο
- Community
- Location within Greece
- Coordinates: 38°8′N 20°43′E
- Country: Greece
- Administrative region: Ionian Islands
- Regional unit: Kefalonia
- Municipality: Argostoli
- Municipal unit: Eleios-Pronnoi

Population (2021)
  - Community: 94
- Time zone: UTC+2 (EET)
  - Summer (DST): UTC+3 (EEST)

Xenopoulo (Greek: Ξενόπουλο) is a small village and a community in the island of Kefalonia, Greece. The community includes the villages Andriolata and Kapandriti. Xenopoulo is situated at the eastern slope of Mount Ainos, at about 320 m elevation. It is 3 km northwest of Agia Eirini, 5 km west of Poros and 21 km east of Argostoli. Xenopoulo was devastated by the 1953 Ionian earthquake.

== Population ==
Year	Population village	Population community
1981	263	-
1991	70	-
2001	92	214
2011	50	108
2021	37	94

== See also ==
- List of settlements in Cephalonia
