= List of settlements in Cephalonia =

This is a list of settlements in Cephalonia, Greece.

- Agia Effimia
- Agia Eirini
- Agia Thekla
- Agios Nikolaos
- Agkonas
- Antipata Erisou
- Arginia
- Argostoli
- Asos
- Atheras
- Chaliotata
- Chavdata
- Chavriata
- Chionata
- Damoulianata
- Davgata
- Digaleto
- Dilinata
- Divarata
- Faraklata
- Farsa
- Favatata
- Fiskardo
- Grizata
- Kaminarata
- Karavados
- Karavomylos
- Kardakata
- Karya
- Katogi
- Kerameies
- Komitata
- Kontogenada
- Kontogourata
- Kothreas
- Kourouklata
- Kouvalata
- Lakithra
- Lixouri
- Lourdata
- Makryotika
- Mantzavinata
- Markopoulo
- Mavrata
- Mesovounia
- Metaxata
- Monopolata
- Mousata
- Neochori
- Omala
- Nyfi
- Pastra
- Patrikata
- Peratata
- Pesada
- Petrikata
- Plagia
- Poros
- Poulata
- Rifi
- Sami
- Skala
- Skineas
- Soullaroi
- Spartia
- Svoronata
- Thinaia
- Touliata
- Troianata
- Valerianos
- Vary
- Vasilikiades
- Villatoria
- Vlachata
- Xenopoulo
- Zola

== See also ==
- List of towns and villages in Greece
