= Demoutsantata =

Demoutsantata Δεμουτσαντάτα
- Settlement
- Location within Greece
- Coordinates: 38°09′11″N 20°33′11″E
- Country: Greece
- Administrative region: Ionian Islands
- Regional unit: Kefalonia
- Municipality: Argostoli
- Municipal unit: Argostoli
- Community: Troianata

Population (2021)
  - Total: 51
- Time zone: UTC+2 (EET)
  - Summer (DST): UTC+3 (EEST)

Demoutsantata (Greek: Δεμουτσαντάτα, before 1940: Μοντεσαντάτα - Montesantata) is a village in the municipal unit of Argostoli on the island of Kefalonia, Greece. It is part of the community of Troianata. It is located 1 km south of Troianata and 6 km southeast of Argostoli.

== Population ==
Historical population
Year	Pop.	±%
1991	58	—
2001	59	+1.7%
2011	109	+84.7%
2021	51	−53.2%

== See also ==
- List of settlements in Cephalonia
