= Pastra =

Pastra Πάστρα
- Community
- Location within Greece
- Coordinates: 38°6′N 20°45′E
- Country: Greece
- Administrative region: Ionian Islands
- Regional unit: Kefalonia
- Municipality: Argostoli
- Municipal unit: Eleios-Pronnoi

Population (2021)
  - Community: 160
- Time zone: UTC+2 (EET)
  - Summer (DST): UTC+3 (EEST)

Pastra (Greek: Πάστρα) is a village and a community in the southeastern part of the island of Kefalonia, Greece. It was the seat of the municipality of Eleios-Pronnoi. The community consists of the villages Pastra and Kremmydi. Pastra is 2 km northeast of Markopoulo, 3 km south of Agia Eirini, 5 km northwest of Skala, 6 km southwest of the port town of Poros and 25 km southeast of Argostoli.

== Population ==
Year	Population village	Population community
1981	245	-
1991	200	-
2001	175	243
2011	133	173
2021	122	160

== History ==
According to 19th century Greek geographer and historian, Antonios Miliarakis, the village of Pastra and the area of the two villages (Kremmydi and Agios Giorgis) around it, used to be called Balta (later Valtes), and got its name from the many reeds and the streams it has. The name derives from βάλτος (váltos), meaning "swamp" or "bog", a word often considered an Illyrian substratum word with cognates in Albanian, Romanian, and Proto-Slavic. The name "Balta" appears in the records of the local notary, the priest Stamatios de Montesantos (active 1535–1553), who on September 7, 1550, recorded a transaction for a field located "in the position of Balta at Kefalovryso". Kefalovryso (Κεφαλόβρυσο, literally "head-spring") is a natural spring in modern-day Pastra that still flows with fresh water, and its presence explains the area's marshy character and original name.

The broader area of Balta encompassed several smaller settlements further up the mountains, including Fournioti (Φουρνιώτη) and Theodoritsi (Θεοδωρίτση). These higher villages served as defensive positions against pirate raids and Ottoman incursions during the Venetian era. The settlements took their names from local families: Michalis and Frangos Fourniotis are recorded in land transactions in 1549, and Ioannis Theodoritzis appears in connection with land agreements near Pastra in 1553.

After the Venetian conquest of Cephalonia in 1500, the region was reorganised under Venetian feudal rule. In September 1503, the brothers Vicenzo, Bernardin, and Zuanne Da Canal, a prominent Venetian patrician family, were granted the island's capitaneria (governorship) for ten years in recognition of their family's military sacrifices at Lepanto. In 1505, Vicenzo da Canal was further granted the extensive feudal Barony of Polyxena Tocco (Pulissena di Tocco), encompassing the fertile lands of Elios and Potamákia (near Skala). The family became deeply embedded in the local community over time, with the name Hellenized from Da Canal to Kanalis (Καναλής). Records from 1536 identify the landowner kyratza Leni, the widow of the late nobleman ser Nikolo de Kanali, who held leased property in the Elios area, and property boundaries in the district were identified by the name "De Kanalena".

According to Miliarakis, Albanian soldiers from the Albanian colony of the Republic of Venice inhabited the area during the 15th century, when the Venetians gave them land in the "xomero" (an outlying place, away from the capital) to settle with their families. These settlers were stradioti, light cavalry troops often recruited from Arvanite and Greek refugees of lost Venetian fortresses such as Modon and Coron. They were granted small plots of land (in feudo) in exchange for permanent military readiness to defend the island's coast. In the early years of the settlement, until 1517, these soldiers were sometimes compensated in salt from the island's stores rather than currency. At the time, Kefalonia was also a colony of the Republic of Venice.

Though the area is often associated mainly with the arrival of Arvanite stradioti, records from the 1530s and 1540s show a more mixed community in the Balta area. Families like Vouthlepsis (Βούθλεψης) and Halkias (Χαλκιάς) were well established in the Elios region before the Venetian conquest of 1500, as part of the island's long-standing Greek farming population. Among the military settlers themselves, Zapanti's analysis of the original Venetian registers (Senato Mar, Registro 15) shows how names were gradually Hellenized: "Barasso Isari", recorded in the first mission of 32 stradioti sent to Cephalonia, appears in local records from the 1530s onwards as Mpavassis Isaris (Μπαβάσης Ίσαρης). This same family gained a prominent position in the area: Markos Mpavassis was granted extensive lands in the Katelios area (at the position of Vasilika) in 1505. Other prominent families active in land transactions and local affairs during the 16th century included the Roumantsas (Ρουμαντζάς), Chionis (Χιόνης), Ambatis (Αμπάτης), Krassa (Κρασάς), Mazaraki (Μαζαράκης), whose members were already recognised as notables (primarii) by 1502, and the Kolaitis (Κολαΐτης) families. The area also supported a small professional class, including the self-taught doctor Ioannis Markopoulos, a significant landowner and wheat trader before his accidental death around 1540. Together, these families formed the core of the local arhontes (notables) who managed the southeastern coast of Cephalonia.

The streams of Balta and the spring at Kefalovryso supported an agricultural economy centred on currants, vines, and livestock. By the 17th century, the Elios-Pronnoi region had become one of the island's most productive zones, with Cephalonia recognised as one of the world's largest exporters of currants. The currant trade, which had made rural Greece prosperous throughout the 19th century, collapsed after 1893 when French vineyards recovered from phylloxera and France imposed protective tariffs, causing international currant prices to plummet and triggering a prolonged economic depression across the country. The 1953 Ionian earthquake compounded this decline, destroying most of the built environment across Kefalonia and prompting many remaining families from Pastra and the wider Elios district to emigrate to the United States, Australia, and Canada. Those who stayed often relocated from the higher mountain settlements of Fournioti and Theodoritsi down toward the main road, leaving those villages all but abandoned with no more than one or two inhabitants today.

The village was renamed Pastra in 1890, a name it retains to the present day. Until 2010 it was the capital of the municipality of Elios-Pronnon.

== See also ==
- List of settlements in Cephalonia
