= Epanochori, Cephalonia =

Epanochori Επανωχώρι
- Settlement
- Location within Greece
- Coordinates: 38°9′N 20°36′E
- Country: Greece
- Administrative region: Ionian Islands
- Regional unit: Cephalonia
- Municipality: Argostoli
- Municipal unit: Omala
- Elevation: 480 m (1,570 ft)

Population (2021)
  - Total: 25
- Time zone: UTC+2 (EET)
  - Summer (DST): UTC+3 (EEST)
- Postal code: 281 00
- Area code: 26710
- Vehicle registration: KE

Epanochori (Greek: Επανωχώρι) is a village in the municipal unit of Omala on the island of Cephalonia, Greece. It is located 10 km east of Argostoli and 15 km west of Poros. Epanochori is located on the small road from Valsamata to Vlachata. The village sits on the westernmost part of the Aenos range.

== Historical population ==
| Year | Population |
|---|---|
| 1991 | 43 |
| 2001 | 61 |
| 2011 | 33 |
| 2021 | 25 |
