= Troianata =

Troianata Τρωιανάτα
- Community
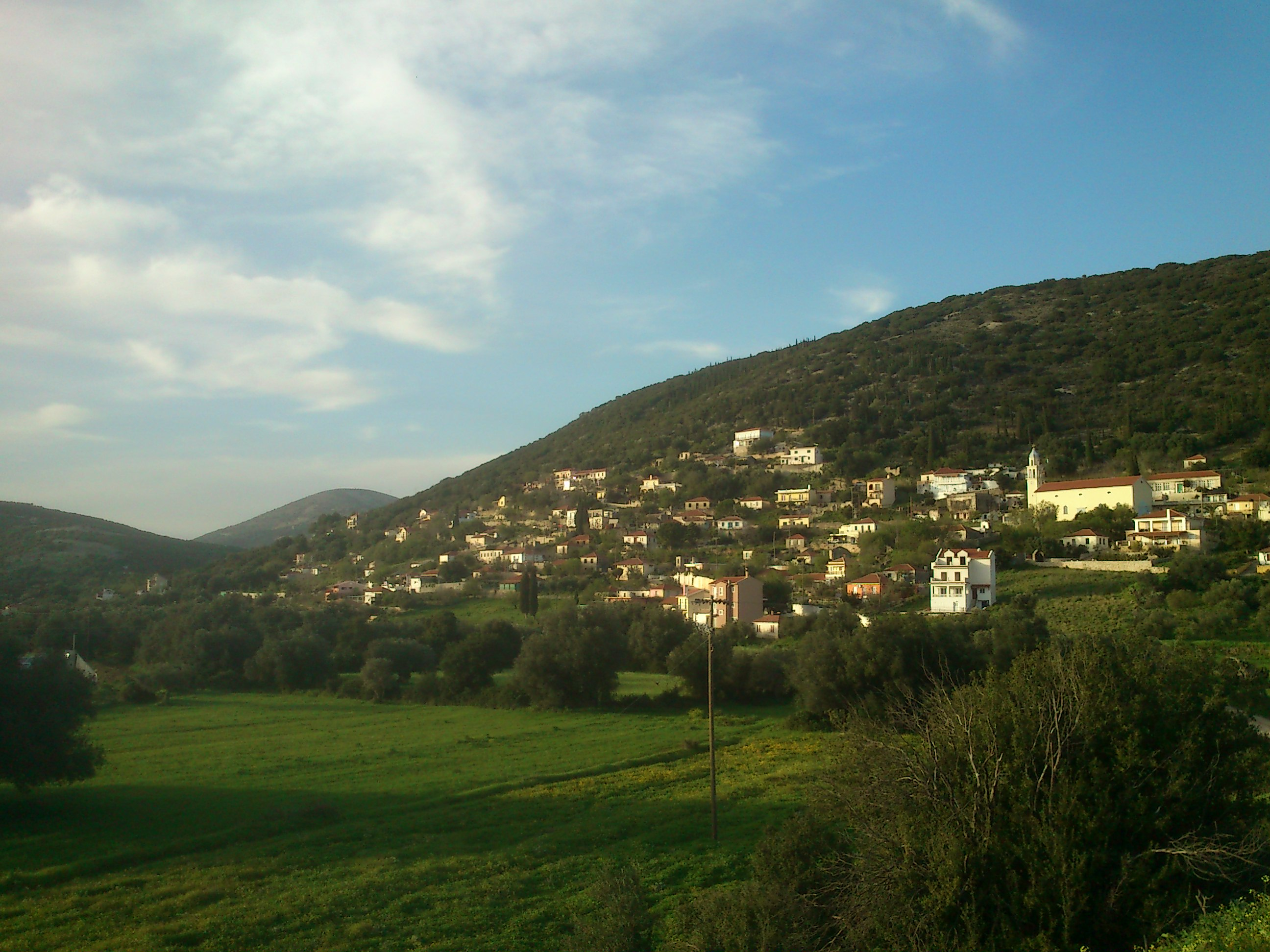

- Location within Greece
- Coordinates: 38°9.5′N 20°33.4′E
- Country: Greece
- Administrative region: Ionian Islands
- Regional unit: Kefalonia
- Municipality: Argostoli
- Municipal unit: Argostoli

Population (2021)
  - Community: 248
- Time zone: UTC+2 (EET)
  - Summer (DST): UTC+3 (EEST)
- Vehicle registration: KE

Troianata (Greek: Τρωιανάτα) is a village and a community in the municipal unit of Argostoli, on the island of Cephalonia, Greece. The community consists of the villages Troianata, Demoutsantata and Mitakata. Troianata is situated on a hillside, at about 300 m elevation. It is 3 km north of Peratata, 3 km southwest of Valsamata and 6 km southeast of Argostoli. Troianata suffered great damage from the 1953 Ionian earthquake.

== Historical population ==
Year	Population community
1981	168
1991	130
2001	175
2011	223
2021	248

== See also ==
- List of settlements in Cephalonia
