= Agia Eirini, Cephalonia =

Agia Eirini Άγια Ειρήνη
- Community
- Location within Greece
- Coordinates: 38°7.3′N 20°45.1′E
- Country: Greece
- Administrative region: Ionian Islands
- Regional unit: Cephalonia
- Municipality: Argostoli
- Municipal unit: Eleios-Pronnoi

Population (2021)
  - Community: 294
- Time zone: UTC+2 (EET)
  - Summer (DST): UTC+3 (EEST)

Agia Eirini (Greek: Άγια Ειρήνη, for Saint Irene) is a community in the municipal unit of Eleios-Pronnoi in the southeastern part of the island of Cephalonia, Greece. It is situated in an inland valley, at about 90 m elevation. It is 2 km south of Tzanata, 3 km southeast of Xenopoulo, 3 km north of Pastra and 4 km southwest of Poros. It is located on the road connecting Poros with Argostoli. It was historically known as Arakli (Αράκλη), a name related to Heracles according to local legends, and there's a statue of Heracles fighting a lion in the village.. Ancient coins minted in the wider region of Pronnoi also depict the club of Heracles.

== Historical population ==
Year	Population
1981	284
1991	306
2001	363
2011	314
2021	294

== See also ==
- List of settlements in Cephalonia
