= Omala =

Omala may refer to:

- Omala, Greece, a community in Kefalonia
- Omala, Nigeria, a Local Government Area in Kogi State
- Omala (bivalve), a genus of bivalve molluscs in the family Tellinidae
