= Epanochori =

Epanochori (Greek: Επανωχώρι) may refer to several places in Greece:

- Epanochori, Chania, a village in the regional unit of Chania
- Epanochori, Cephalonia, a settlement on the island of Cephalonia
