= Eleios-Pronnoi =

Eleios-Pronnoi Ελειός-Πρόννοι
- Municipal unit
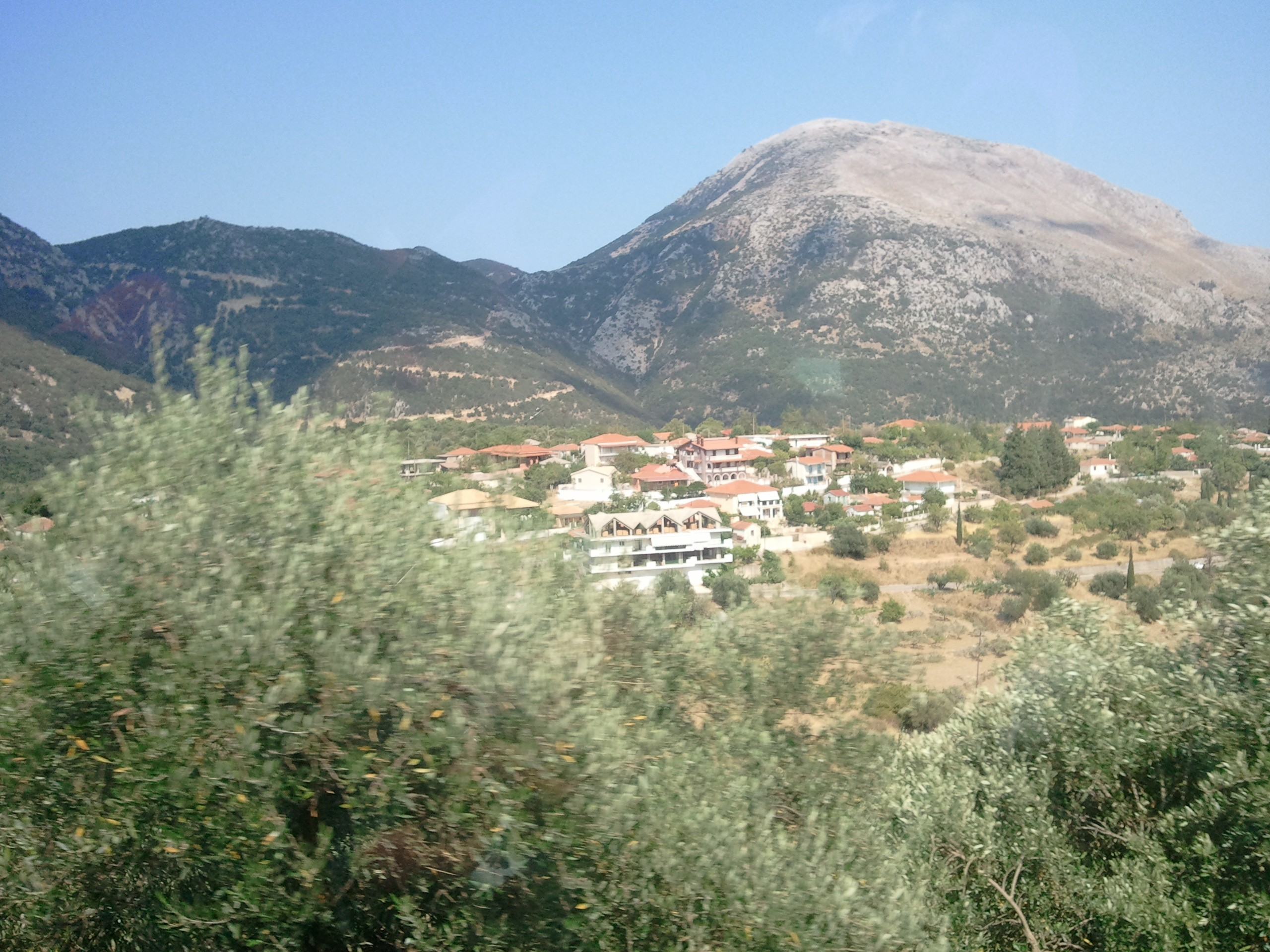

- Location within the regional unit

- Location within Greece
- Coordinates: 38°6′N 20°45′E
- Country: Greece
- Administrative region: Ionian Islands
- Regional unit: Kefalonia
- Municipality: Argostoli

Area
  - Municipal unit: 111.687 km^{2} (43.123 sq mi)
- Elevation: 280 m (920 ft)

Population (2021)
  - Municipal unit: 3,395
  - Municipal unit density: 30.40/km^{2} (78.73/sq mi)
- Time zone: UTC+2 (EET)
  - Summer (DST): UTC+3 (EEST)
- Postal code: 280 82
- Area code: 26710
- Vehicle registration: ΚΕ
- Website: www.elios-pronnoi.gr

Eleios-Pronnoi (Greek: Ελειός-Πρόννοι) is a former municipality on the island of Kefalonia, Ionian Islands, Greece. Since the 2019 local government reform it is part of the municipality Argostoli, of which it is a municipal unit. The municipal unit has an area of 111.687 km^{2}. The seat of the municipality was in Pastra. The municipal unit contains several mountain ranges, including the eastern part of Mount Ainos.

== Population ==
Year	Population
1991	3,275
2001	3,840
2011	3,677
2021	3,395

== Subdivisions ==
The municipal unit Eleios-Pronnoi is subdivided into the following communities (constituent villages in brackets):

- Agia Eirini
- Agios Nikolaos
- Arginia
- Chionata (Chionata, Kolaitis, Thiramonas)
- Markopoulo (Markopoulo, Kateleios, Kato Kateleios)
- Mavrata
- Pastra (Pastra, Kremmydi)
- Poros (Poros, Asprogerakas, Kampitsata, Riza, Tzanata)
- Skala (Skala, Aleimmatas, Fanies, Ratzakli)
- Valerianos (Valerianos, Atsoupades, Plateies)
- Xenopoulo (Xenopoulo, Andriolata, Kapandriti)
