= Davgata =

Davgata Δαυγάτα
- Community
- Location within Greece
- Coordinates: 38°13.1′N 20°29.6′E
- Country: Greece
- Administrative region: Ionian Islands
- Regional unit: Kefalonia
- Municipality: Argostoli
- Municipal unit: Argostoli

Population (2021)
  - Community: 62
- Time zone: UTC+2 (EET)
  - Summer (DST): UTC+3 (EEST)
- Vehicle registration: KE

Davgata (Greek: Δαυγάτα) is a village in the island of Cephalonia, Greece. It is part of the municipal unit of Argostoli. It is situated on a mountain slope above the eastern shore of the Gulf of Argostoli, at about 300 m elevation. Davgata is 2 km southeast of Farsa, 2 km west of Dilinata and 5 km north of Argostoli. Davgata has a Museum of Natural History, opened in 1996. The mountaintop of Evmorfia, elevation 1,043 m, lies to the northeast. Davgata was severely damaged by the 1953 Ionian earthquake. Davgata has a natural history museum which is currently closed.

== Historical population ==
Year	Population
1981	116
1991	125
2001	128
2011	66
2021	62
