= Faraklata =

Faraklata Φαρακλάτα
- Community
- Location within Greece
- Coordinates: 38°12′N 20°31′E
- Country: Greece
- Administrative region: Ionian Islands
- Regional unit: Cephalonia
- Municipality: Argostoli
- Municipal unit: Argostoli

Population (2021)
  - Community: 1,123
- Time zone: UTC+2 (EET)
  - Summer (DST): UTC+3 (EEST)
- Vehicle registration: KE

Faraklata (Greek: Φαρακλάτα) is a village and a community in the municipal unit of Argostoli, Cephalonia, Greece. It is situated on a mountain slope above the eastern shore of the Gulf of Argostoli, at about 220 m elevation. Faraklata is 2 km south of Dilinata, 4 km northeast of Argostoli and 7 km northwest of Valsamata. The community consists of the villages Faraklata, Razata, Drapano and Prokopata. There is a small cave east of the village. Faraklata suffered great damage from the 1953 Ionian earthquake.

== Historical population ==
Year	Community population	Village population
1981	-	472
1991	-	382
2001	812	411
2011	1,058	330
2021	1,123	342
