= Gulf of Argostoli =

Gulf of the Ionian Sea on the island of Cephalonia, western Greece

Coordinates: 38°10′N 20°27′E

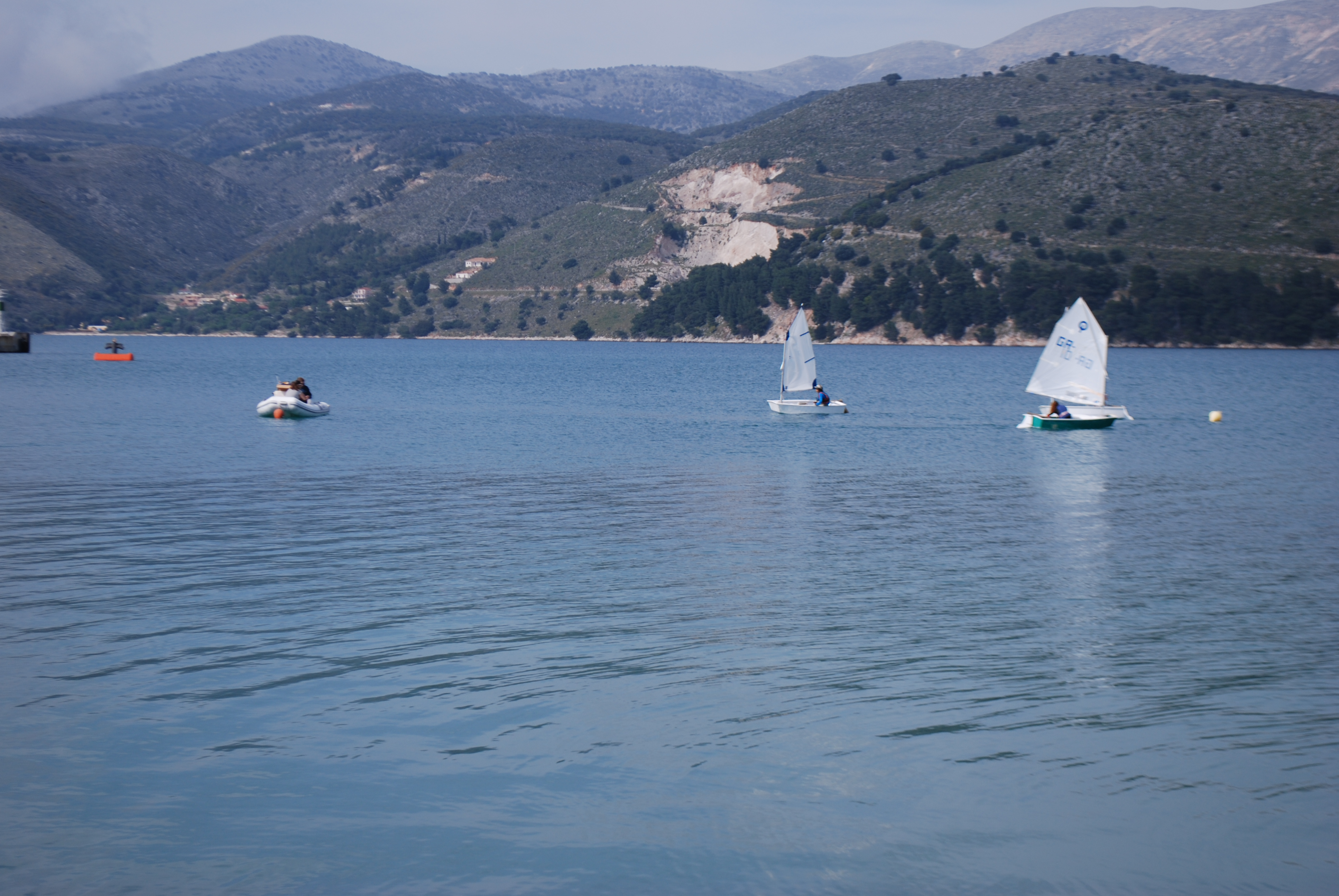
Gulf of Argostoli

The Gulf of Argostoli (Greek: Κόλπος Αργοστολίου) is a gulf of the Ionian Sea on the island of Cephalonia, western Greece. It separates the Paliki peninsula from mainland Cephalonia, and opens toward the Ionian Sea in the south. The gulf is 13 km (8.1 mi) long (north to south) and 2 to 3 km (1.2 to 1.9 mi) wide. Lixouri, the second-largest town of Cephalonia, is situated on its western shore, and the capital Argostoli is situated on a bay in the eastern shore. The shores of the gulf are mountainous, especially in the east.

The main settlements on the shore of the gulf are, from the southwest and clockwise: Lixouri, Agios Dimitrios, Kouvalata, Kontogourata, Farsa, Drapano and Argostoli. The Gulf of Argostoli is navigable, and the ports of Argostoli and Lixouri are served by ferries. Concerns have risen about the environmental effects of fish farming in the gulf.
