= Dilinata =

Dilinata Διλινάτα
- Community
- Location within Greece
- Coordinates: 38°13.5′N 20°31′E
- Country: Greece
- Administrative region: Ionian Islands
- Regional unit: Kefalonia
- Municipality: Argostoli
- Municipal unit: Argostoli

Population (2021)
  - Community: 507
- Time zone: UTC+2 (EET)
  - Summer (DST): UTC+3 (EEST)
- Vehicle registration: KE

Dilinata (Greek: Διλινάτα) is a village in the municipal unit of Argostoli, Cephalonia, Greece. It is situated on a mountain slope, at 400 m elevation. It is 2 km east of Davgata, 2 km north of Faraklata and 6 km northeast of Argostoli. The mountaintop of Evmorfia, elevation 1,043 m, is to the northeast. Dilinata suffered great damage from the 1953 Ionian earthquake.

It is the place of origin of Giorgos Kalafatis, the founder of Panathinaikos Athletic Club.

== Historical population ==
Year	Population
1981	505
1991	719
2001	739
2011	496
2021	507
