= Juan de Fuca =

Greek explorer in Spanish service (1536–1602)

- Born: Ioannis Fokas; 10 June 1536; Cephalonia, Venetian Ionian Islands (now Greece)
- Died: 23 July 1602 (aged 66); Cephalonia
- Occupation: Sailor

Juan de Fuca (10 June 1536 – 23 July 1602) was a Greek sailor and explorer under the patronage of Philip II of Spain. He is best known for his claim to have explored the Strait of Anián—now known as the Strait of Juan de Fuca—between Vancouver Island (now part of British Columbia, Canada) and the Olympic Peninsula (now part of northwestern Washington state in the United States).

== Name ==
"Juan de Fuca" is a hispanicization of the Greek name Ioannis Fokas or Phokas (Ἰωάννης Φωκᾶς), latinized as Johannes Phocas. However, his exact name is somewhat uncertain. Some sources state that his actual name was Apostolos Valerianos (Ἀπόστολος Βαλεριάνος). It is possible that he was baptized as Apostolos and later adopted the name Ioannis or Juan because Apóstol is not a common Spanish name. It is known that his father and grandfather bore the name Focas, so it seems likely that Valerianos was a nickname or epithet borrowed from the village where he grew up on Cephalonia.

== Family and early life ==
De Fuca's grandfather Emmanouil Fokas (Ἐμμανουὴλ Φωκᾶς) fled Constantinople when it fell to Ottoman forces in 1453, accompanied by his brother Andronikos (Ἀνδρόνικος). The two settled first in the Peloponnese, where Andronikos remained, but in 1470 Emmanouil moved to the island of Cephalonia. Ioannis's father Iakovos (Ἰάκωβος) established himself in the village of Valerianos on the island and came to be known as "the Valeriano Fokas" (Φωκᾶς ὁ Βαλεριάνος, Fokas ho Valerianos) to distinguish him from his brothers. De Fuca was born in Valerianos on 10 June 1536. Little is known about his life before he entered the service of Spain some time around 1555.

== Early career ==
De Fuca's early voyages were to the Far East, and he claimed to have arrived in New Spain in 1587 when, off Cabo San Lucas in Baja California, the English privateer Thomas Cavendish seized his galleon Santa Ana and deposited him ashore. De Fuca was a well-traveled seaman, perfecting his skill as a pilot in the Spanish fleet. He claimed that King Philip II of Spain recognized him for his excellence and made him pilot of the Spanish navy in the West Indies (a title he held for forty years), but there is no record in any surviving Spanish archives of his name or position or of his visit to the royal court. Before he made his famous trip up the northwest coast of the North American continent, he sailed to China, the Philippines and Mexico. The Strait of Juan de Fuca between the United States of America and Canada was named for him by British Captain Charles Barkley because it was at the same latitude that Juan de Fuca described as the location of the Strait of Anián.

== Voyages to the north ==
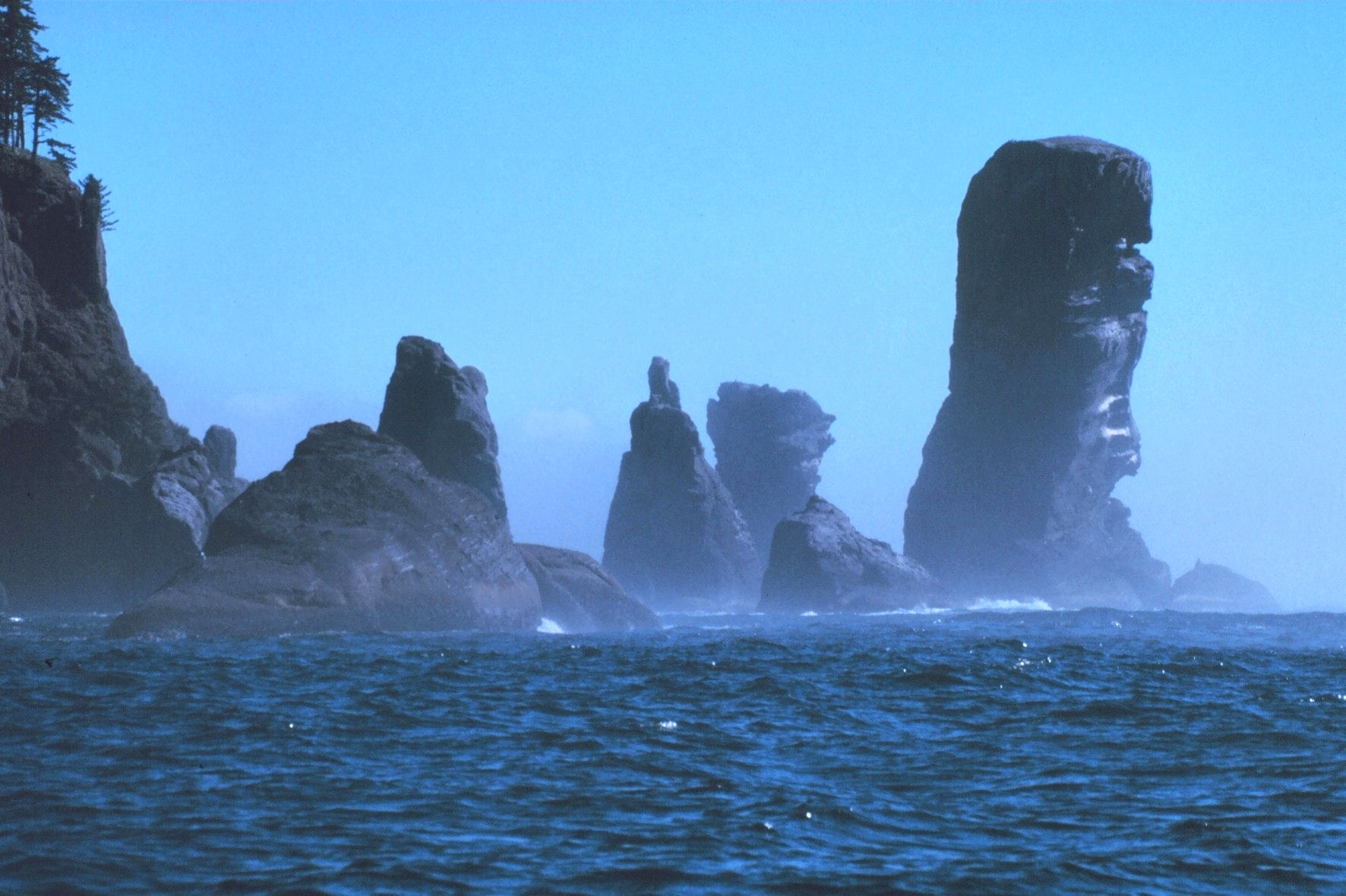
Fuca Pillar at Cape Flattery, Washington, beside the Strait of Juan de Fuca

According to de Fuca's account, he undertook two voyages of exploration on the orders of the Viceroy of New Spain, Luis de Velasco, marqués de Salinas, both of which were intended to find the fabled Strait of Anián, believed to be a Northwest Passage, a sea route linking the Atlantic and Pacific oceans. The one voyage saw 200 soldiers and three small ships under the overall command of a Spanish captain (with de Fuca as pilot and master) assigned the task of finding the Strait of Anián and fortifying it against the English. This expedition failed when, allegedly due to the captain's malfeasance, the soldiers mutinied and returned home to California. (Note that in this period, Spanish doctrine divided control of ships and fleets between the military commander, who was an army officer, and the sailing and navigation commander, who was a mariner.)

De Fuca's second voyage, in 1592, was more successful. Having sailed north with a caravel, a pinnace, and a few armed marines, he returned to Acapulco and claimed to have found the strait, with a large island at its mouth, at around 47° north latitude. The Strait of Juan de Fuca is in fact at around 48° N, although Fuca's account of sailing into it departs from reality, describing a region far different from what actually existed there. During the voyage, De Fuca also noted a "high pinnacle or spired rock", which may have been Fuca Pillar, a tall, almost rectangular rock on the western shore of Cape Flattery at the northwestern extremity of the Olympic Peninsula, in what is now the U.S. state of Washington, beside the Strait of Juan de Fuca – although De Fuca noted it being on the other side of the strait.

Despite Velasco's repeated promises, however, De Fuca never received the great rewards he claimed as his due. After two years, and on the viceroy's urging, De Fuca traveled to Spain to make his case to the court in person. Disappointed again and disgusted with the Spanish, the aging Greek determined to retire to his home in Kefallonia, but was in 1596 convinced by an Englishman, Michael Lok (also spelled "Locke" in English and French documents from the period), to offer his services to Spain's archenemy, Queen Elizabeth. Nothing came of Lok and De Fuca's proposals, but it is through Lok's account that the story of Juan de Fuca entered English letters.

== Controversy ==
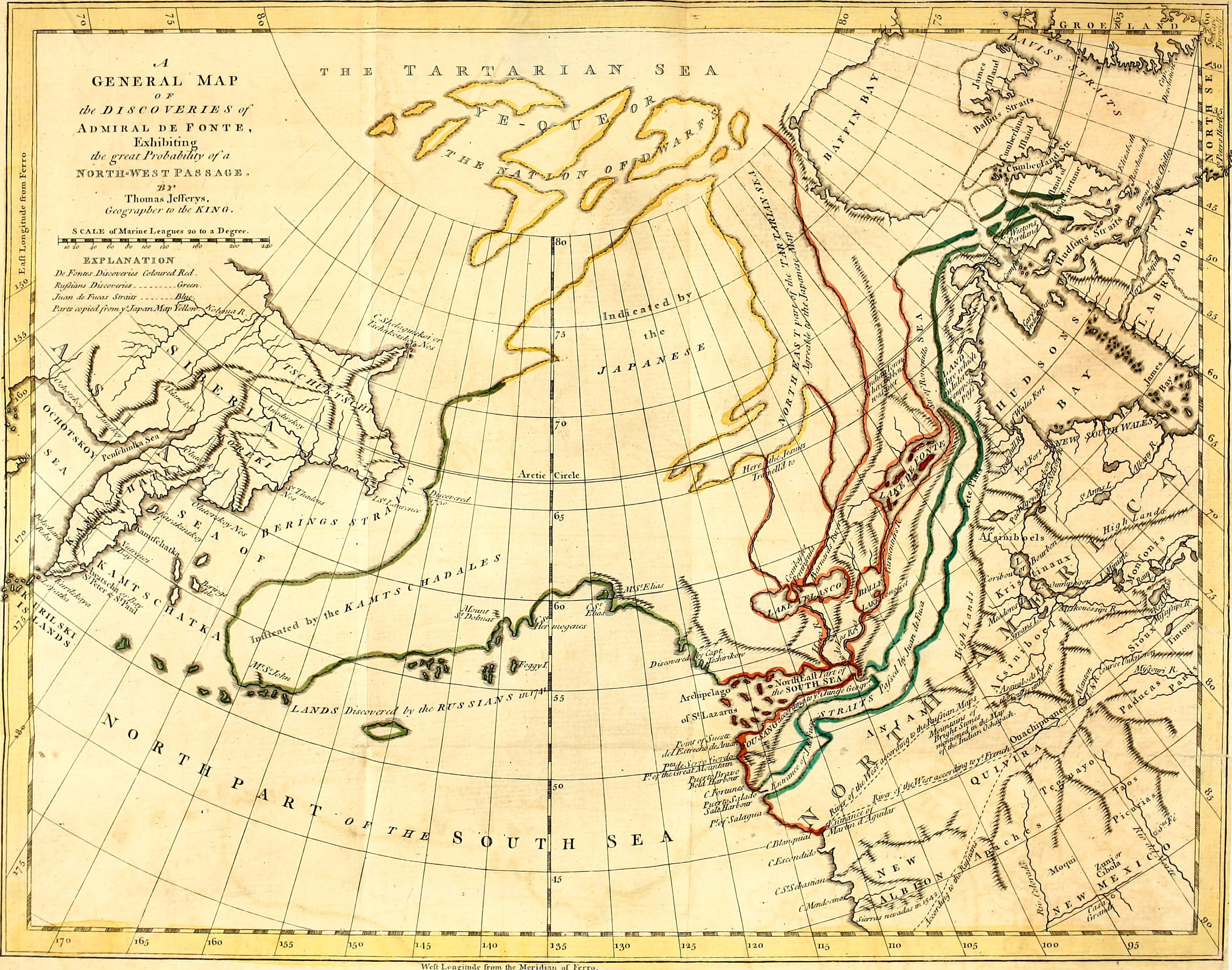
1768 map showing Juan de Fuca's strait, between New Albion and an island roughly corresponding to the later British Columbia and Alaska, as the entrance of the Northwest Passage

Because the only written evidence for De Fuca's voyages lay in Lok's account — researchers being unable to find records of the expedition in Spanish colonial archives — there was long much controversy over his discovery and indeed whether he had ever even existed as a real person; several scholars have dismissed Juan de Fuca as entirely fictitious, and the 18th-century British explorer Captain Cook strongly doubted that the strait De Fuca claimed to have discovered even existed (although Cook actually sailed past the Strait of Juan de Fuca without entering it, and did stop at Nootka Sound on the west coast of Vancouver Island). With later English exploration and settlement of the area, however, De Fuca's claims seemed much more credible.

In 1859, an American researcher, with the help of the U.S. Consul in the Ionian Islands, was able to demonstrate not only that De Fuca had lived but also that his family and history were well-known on the islands. In 2003, Samuel Bawlf posited that "Fuca's story was nothing more than a fabrication designed to extract money from the English government". According to Bawlf, De Fuca story's would have in fact been based on Francis Drake's 1579 exploration of the Northwest Passage at its western end. De Fuca would have learnt about the strait from a pilot named Morera, who was part of the Drake expedition. Morera miraculously returned on his own before getting arrested by the Spanish.

== Legacy ==
When the English captain Charles William Barkley, sailing the Imperial Eagle in 1787, (re)discovered the strait De Fuca had described, he renamed it the Strait of Juan de Fuca. The Juan de Fuca Ridge and the Juan de Fuca Plate, a tectonic plate underlying much of the coastline he explored, are in turn named for the Strait of Juan de Fuca. Juan de Fuca Provincial Park on Vancouver Island's West Coast is also named for the strait, as is the hiking trail of the same name.

== See also ==
- Phokas (Byzantine family)
