= Farsa, Greece =

Farsa Φάρσα
- Community
- Location within Greece
- Coordinates: 38°13.7′N 20°28.5′E
- Country: Greece
- Administrative region: Ionian Islands
- Regional unit: Kefalonia
- Municipality: Argostoli
- Municipal unit: Argostoli

Population (2021)
  - Community: 202
- Time zone: UTC+2 (EET)
  - Summer (DST): UTC+3 (EEST)
- Vehicle registration: KE

Farsa (Greek: Φάρσα) is a village on the island of Kefalonia, Greece, part of the municipal unit of Argostoli. It is situated on the eastern shore of the Gulf of Argostoli. Farsa is 2 km northwest of Davgata, 4 km northeast of Lixouri (across the gulf) and 6 km north of Argostoli. Records exist in the Venetian archives for this village since the early Venetian period (16th century). During World War II many Italian soldiers were posted there and it was one of the places that the Massacre of the Acqui Division took place. The 1953 Ionian earthquake damaged many buildings in the old village of Farsa but did not totally destroy it. The remains of the old village are visible today. Dr. Nicholas Zaferatos, an environmental studies professor in the Huxley College at Western Washington University has made a study with his students on the renovation of the old village. The entire population that time as well as other parts of the island were homeless and part of the population left Farsa.

== Historical population ==
Year	Population
1981	132
1991	222
2001	263
2011	215
2021	202
