= Thinaia =

Thinaia Θηναία
- Community
- Location within Greece
- Coordinates: 38°16.5′N 20°28′E
- Country: Greece
- Administrative region: Ionian Islands
- Regional unit: Kefalonia
- Municipality: Argostoli
- Municipal unit: Argostoli

Population (2021)
  - Community: 200
- Time zone: UTC+2 (EET)
  - Summer (DST): UTC+3 (EEST)
- Vehicle registration: KE

Thinaia or Thinia (Greek: Θηναία, Θηνιά) is a community on the island of Kefalonia, Greece. It is located on the northeast side of the Gulf of Argostoli. The community consists of the villages Kardakata, Riza, Kontogourata, Nifi, Agonas and Petrikata. This rural area was once mainly a farming community, where peasants, under the Venetian occupation of the island, worked small terrace plots scattered on the slope of the mountain above and next to the village.

Many villagers have emigrated to other parts of the world, and therefore the village has become very quiet in winter and only sees an expansion in summer time, when first, second and third generation families return for a visit.

The community is also the second home to U.S. soccer prodigy Christoforos Moulinos.

Recently the village has attracted the interest of a historical research team from the UK, which is searching for the site of Odysseus' home and palace. Confirmation of such a theory will have a great impact on the area of Thinaia and especially Kontogourata where the bulk of the research is concentrated.

== Events ==
St. Panteleimon is greatly honoured annually on 27 July at the village of Kontogourata with a feast in honour of the saint at the schoolyard annex. The day starts with a service at the local church and in the evening the traditional dinner, drink and dancing goes on throughout the night.
