= Omala, Greece =

Omala Ομαλά
- Municipal unit
- Location within the regional unit

- Location within Greece
- Coordinates: 38°10′N 20°36′E
- Country: Greece
- Administrative region: Ionian Islands
- Regional unit: Kefalonia
- Municipality: Argostoli

Area
  - Municipal unit: 46.699 km^{2} (18.031 sq mi)
- Elevation: 400 m (1,300 ft)

Population (2021)
  - Municipal unit: 748
  - Municipal unit density: 16.0/km^{2} (41.5/sq mi)
- Time zone: UTC+2 (EET)
  - Summer (DST): UTC+3 (EEST)
- Postal code: 281 00
- Area code: 26710
- Vehicle registration: ΚΕ

Omala (Greek: Ομαλά) is a former community on the island of Kefalonia, Ionian Islands, Greece. Since the 2019 local government reform it is part of the municipality Argostoli, of which it is a municipal unit. It is located in the south-central part of the island. Its land area is 46.699 km² and its population was 748 inhabitants at the 2021 census. The seat of the community was Valsamata, the only significant town (pop. 676 in 2021). Its next largest settlements are Epanochori and Michata.
