= Valsamata =

Valsamata Βαλσαμάτα
- Settlement
- Location within Greece
- Coordinates: 38°10′N 20°36′E
- Country: Greece
- Administrative region: Ionian Islands
- Regional unit: Kefalonia
- Municipality: Argostoli
- Municipal unit: Omala

Population (2021)
  - Total: 676
- Time zone: UTC+2 (EET)
  - Summer (DST): UTC+3 (EEST)
- Postal code: 281 00
- Area code: 26710
- Vehicle registration: KE

Valsamata (Greek: Βαλσαμάτα) is a village in the municipal unit of Omala on the island of Kefalonia, Greece. It is located 9 km east of Argostoli and 17 km west of Poros. The village is situated in a valley between hills, at about 400 m elevation. The 1953 Ionian earthquake caused great damage in Valsamata.

== Historical population ==
Year	Population
1991	771
2001	917
2011	763
2021	676
