= Skala, Cephalonia =

Skala Σκάλα
- Community
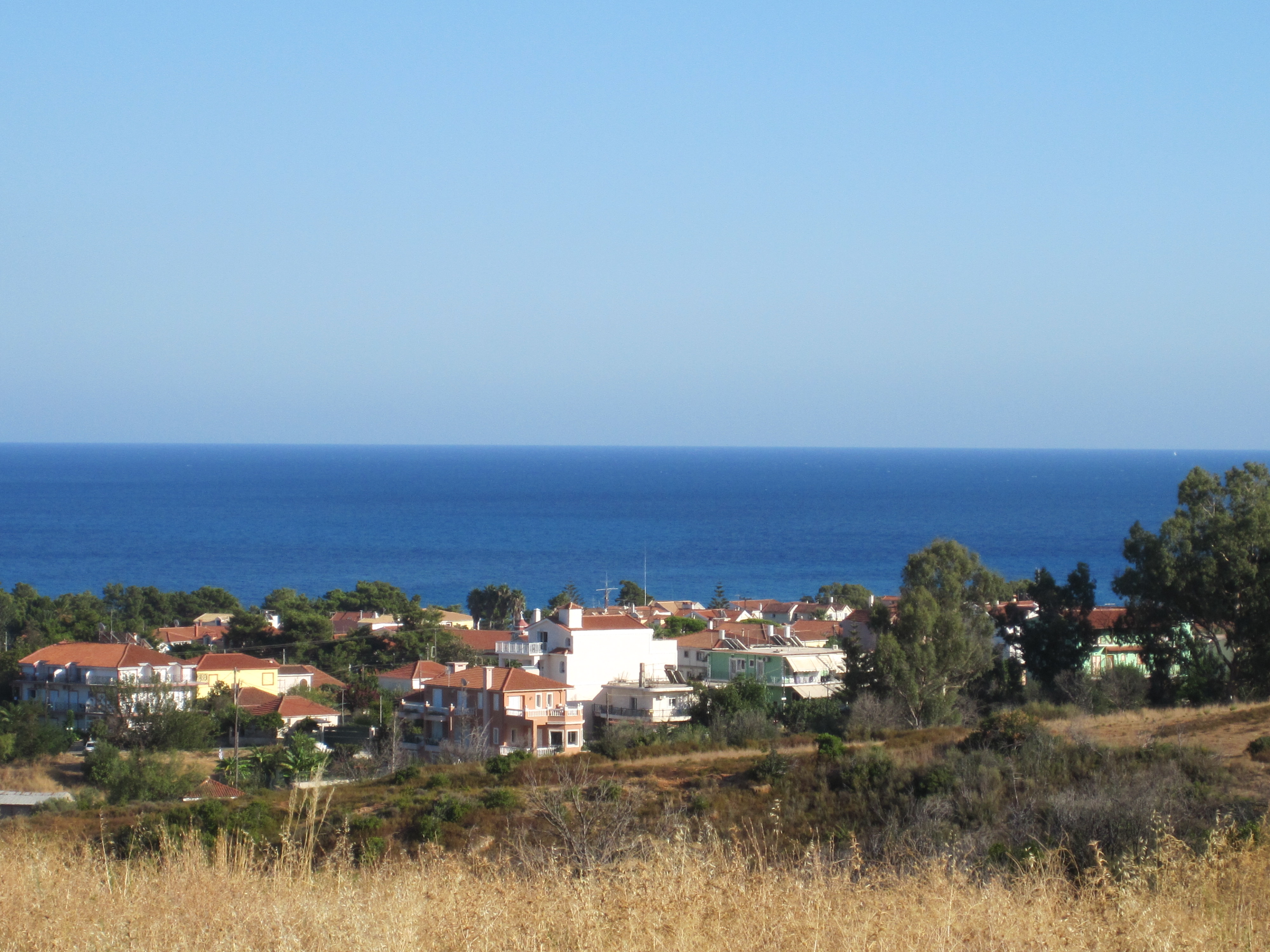

- Location within Greece
- Coordinates: 38°4′N 20°47′E
- Country: Greece
- Administrative region: Ionian Islands
- Regional unit: Cephalonia
- Municipality: Argostoli
- Municipal unit: Eleios-Pronnoi

Population (2021)
  - Community: 804
- Time zone: UTC+2 (EET)
  - Summer (DST): UTC+3 (EEST)

Skala (Greek: Σκάλα) is a village located in the municipal unit of Eleios-Pronnoi, some 39 km south from the island's main town of Argostoli and 14 km SW of Poros, in the south of Cephalonia, one of the Ionian Islands of Greece.

During the summer, Skala becomes a popular holiday destination.

== Villages ==
The community of Skala consists of the following villages:

- Skala
- Aleimmatas
- Ratzakli
- Fanies

== History ==
The current village was built in 1956 and replaces the old village which was levelled during the 1953 Ionian earthquake, killing 36 and injuring hundreds of villagers. The original village was located on the hill behind the present one, as many of the island's were, in order to avoid invasion from raiders and pirates during the previous centuries. The name 'Skala' originates from the Greek word for stairs. It was given this name because when it was in its original place, the houses seemed to ascend almost as though they were a set of stairs.

On the edge of the present village is the remains of a 3rd-century Roman villa with some remarkably well preserved mosaics. Visitors can visit the site for a small fee to see the mosaic flooring in three rooms, which were excavated in 1957.

Three kilometres along the beach road towards Poros is the site of a 6th century BC Temple dedicated to the god Apollo. Here are the foundation stones and parts of three Doric columns.

During the months of April through to October, Skala becomes a popular tourist resort. With beaches, hotels and many restaurants, the town’s population quadruples during the summer months.

== Agriculture ==
Skala was a farming community up until the onset of tourism in the late 20th century. Most families had and still have fields or small holdings on which they grow summer and winter vegetables. They also have excellent wine producing vineyards, and olive trees which provide Greece's elixir of life, olive oil. Orange, lemon, walnut, almond and fig trees have been planted throughout the area.

Herds of goats, sheep and cows freely roam the hillsides around Skala. Multi coloured beehives can be seen dotted around the fields and hillsides, producing Cephalonia's thyme flavoured honey.

== Transport ==
Buses link Skala with the island's main town Argostoli, twice in the morning during the summer months - this reduces to a single service during the winter. Only one bus returns to Skala in the afternoon once the shops in Argostoli close at 2pm. There is also a bus connecting Skala to Poros.
