= Mount Ainos =

Mountain in Greece

Aenos
- Αίνος
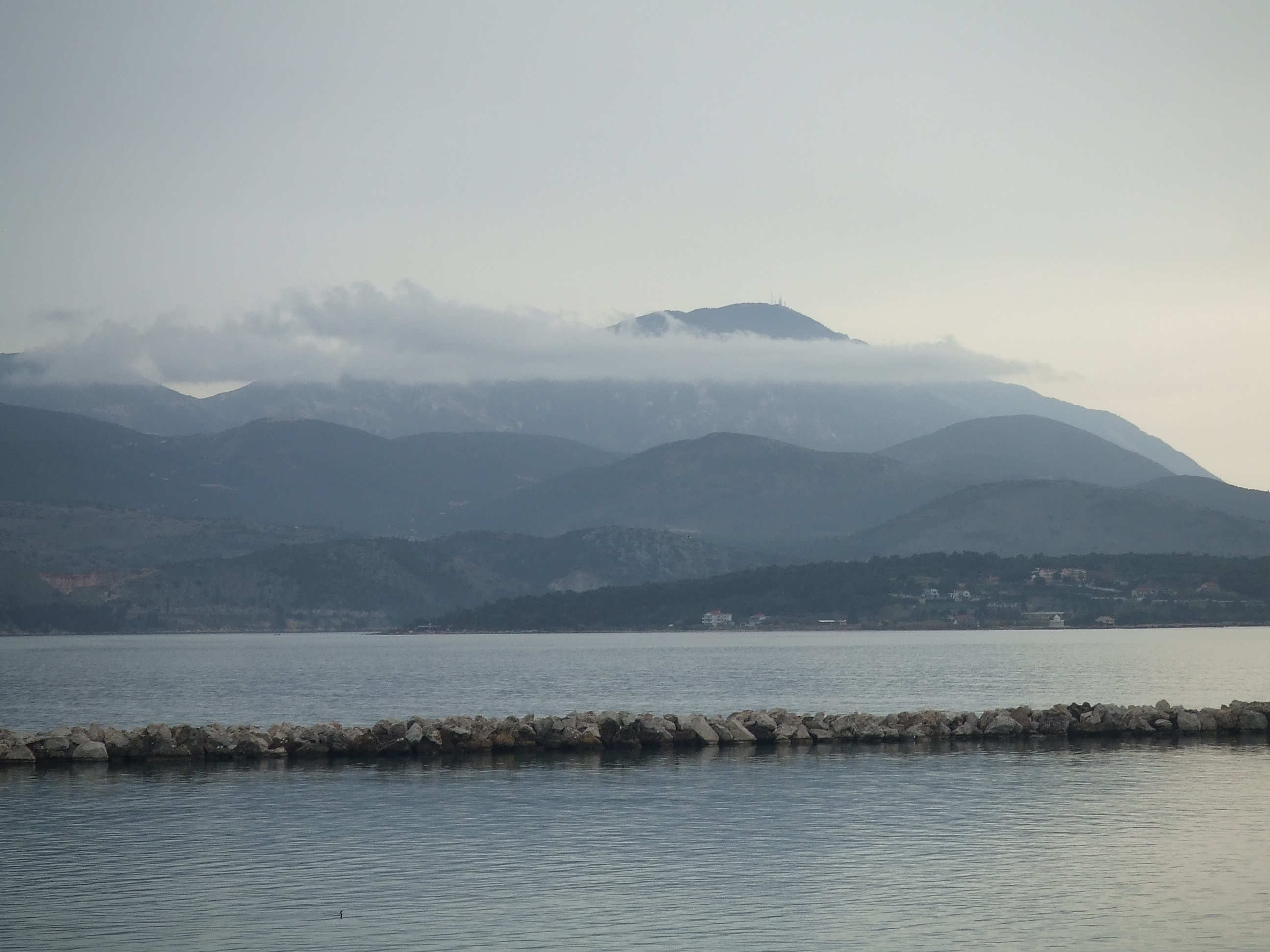
- Mount Aenos from Lixouri

Highest point
- Elevation: 1,628 m (5,341 ft)
- Prominence: 1,628 m (5,341 ft)
- Listing: Ultra
- Coordinates: 38°08′14″N 20°40′22″E

Geography
- Location within Greece
- Location: Kefalonia, Greece

Climbing
- Easiest route: Short walk

Mount Aenos or Ainos (Ancient Greek: Ὄρος Αἶνος; Modern Greek: Όρος Αίνος; Italian: Monte Nero or Montagna Nera) is the tallest mountain on the Ionian island of Cephalonia, Greece, with an elevation of 1,628 metres (5,341 ft). Its bedrock is predominantly dolomite and limestone of Cretaceous age.

Most of the mountain range is designated as a National Park area and is covered with Greek fir (Abies cephalonica) and black pine (Pinus nigra). Pine forests are found between the elevations of 700 to 1,200 metres (2,300 to 3,900 ft). Semi-wild ponies inhabit its forest. On clear days, the view includes the northwest Peloponnese and Aetolia along with the islands of Zakynthos, Lefkada, and Ithaca.

No ski resorts are found on this mountain range, but there are beautiful caves to be seen in the north. A highway passing over the mountain range connecting traffic from southwestern to the eastern part of the island is one of the few roads going into the mountain range. Approximately 3,000 to 4,000 people live on the slopes of Ainos. Multiple television and cellphone relay towers occupy the summit.

According to Strabo, on the mountain there was a sanctuary dedicated to Zeus Ainesios. This sanctuary is also mentioned by Hesiod.

== Walking Route ==
The easiest way to get to the summit is to drive along the Mt Ainos road from the North West to the transmitter station. Leave your car here and then continue along the dirt track on foot for about 10 minutes until you reach some steps to the right and a sign post. Go up these steps for another 10 minutes to reach the summit. A concrete post at the summit has a metal container strapped to it, this contains a visitor book.

A more strenuous walk is the well maintained and signposted route from Digaleto, on the road from Sami to Poros. Drive, or walk, along the road heading West, signposted to Ainos/Einos. The official walk starts at a quarry, about 1 km out of the village. Walk through the quarry and follow the signs containing a white square on a yellow background (some of these signs are a little rusty and appear to be red, or will have fallen down but the pathway is quite obvious). All the major junctions have a map and most have shaded rest areas. Much of the walk is below the tree line and can be cool even in the summer, there are occasional view points along the route. The climb is 1096 metres and the length is 6.5 km.

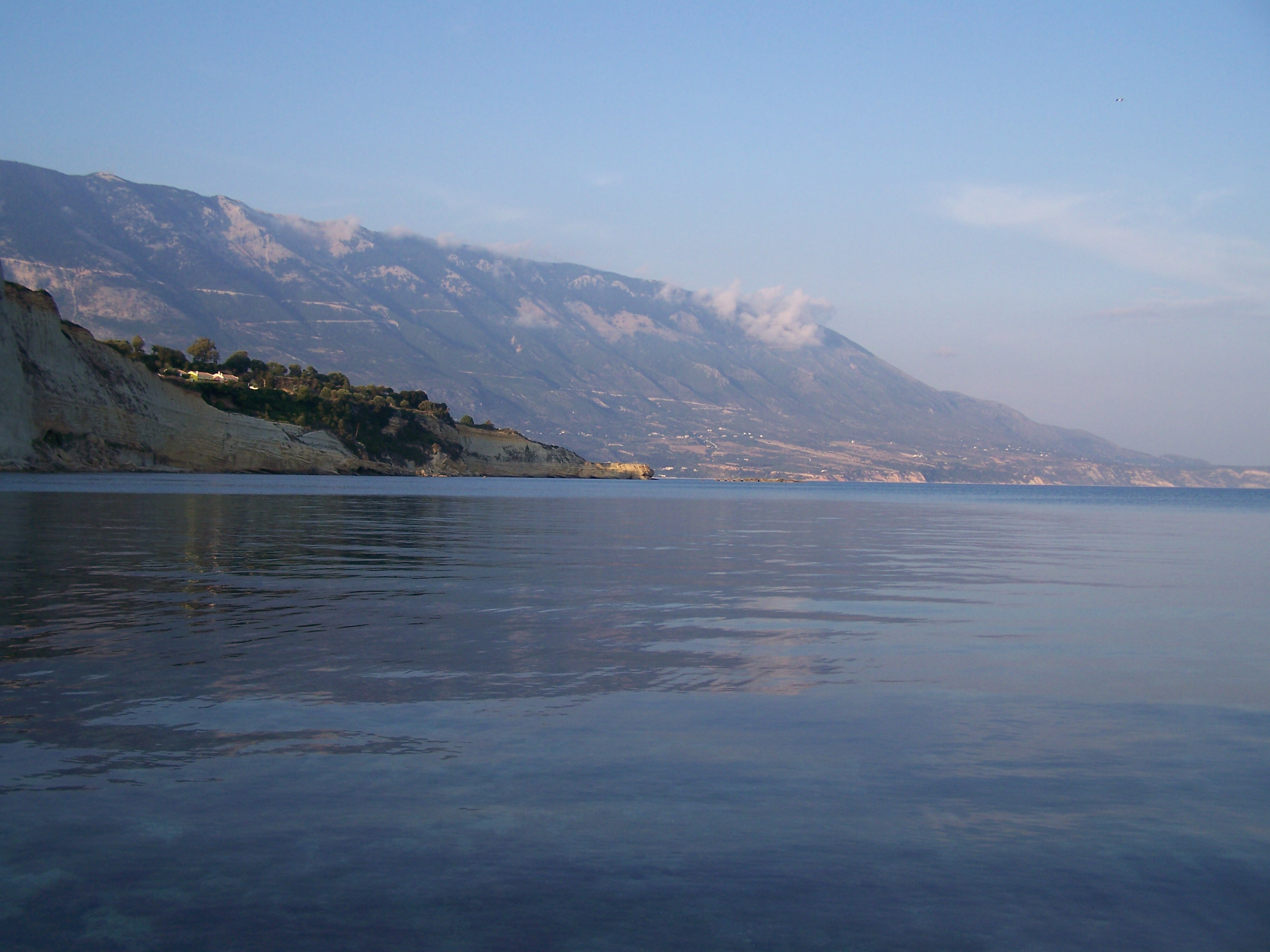
Mount Ainos viewed from the west

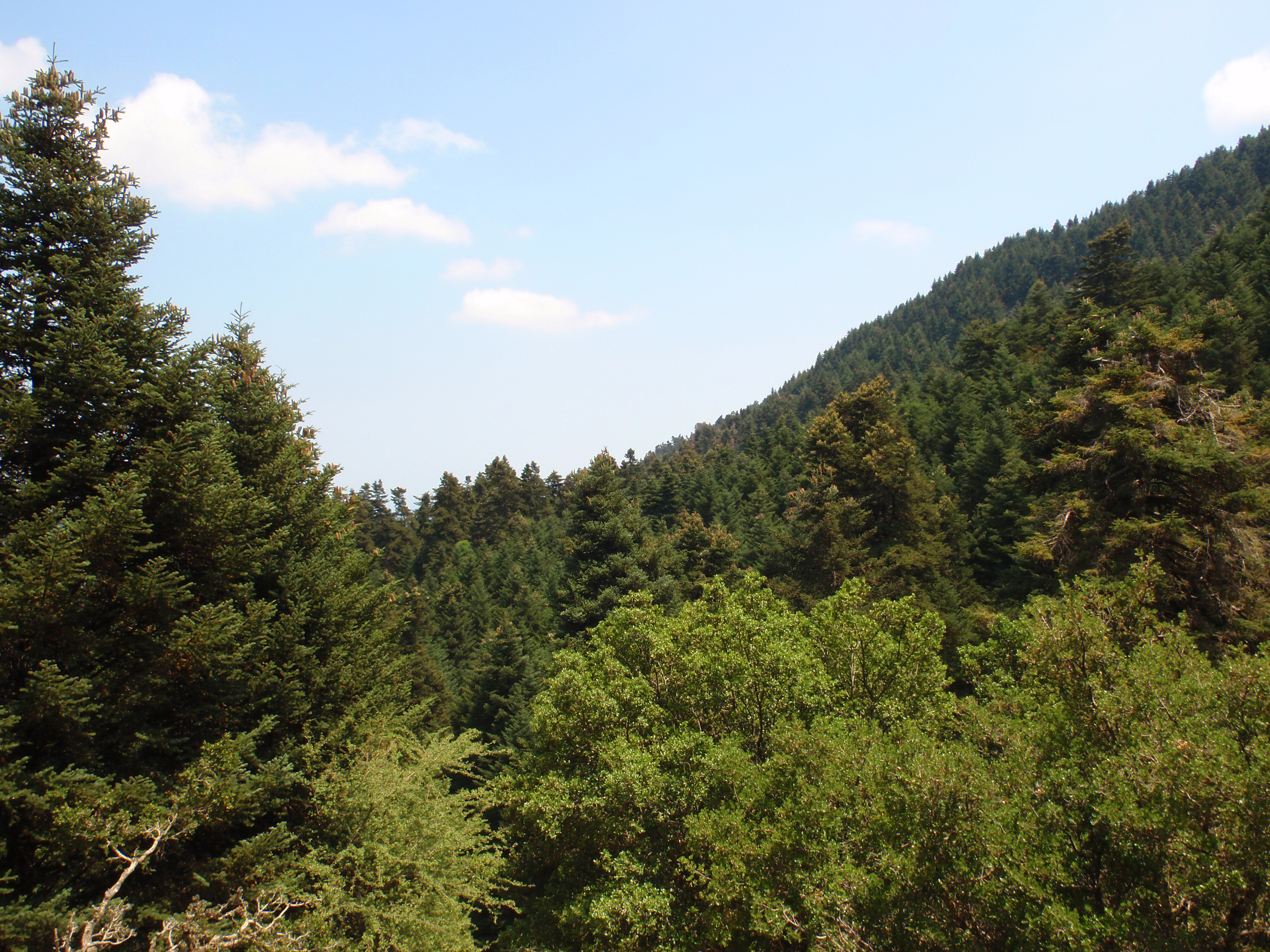
Greek fir forest at Ainos
