= Poros, Cephalonia =

Poros Πόρος
- Community
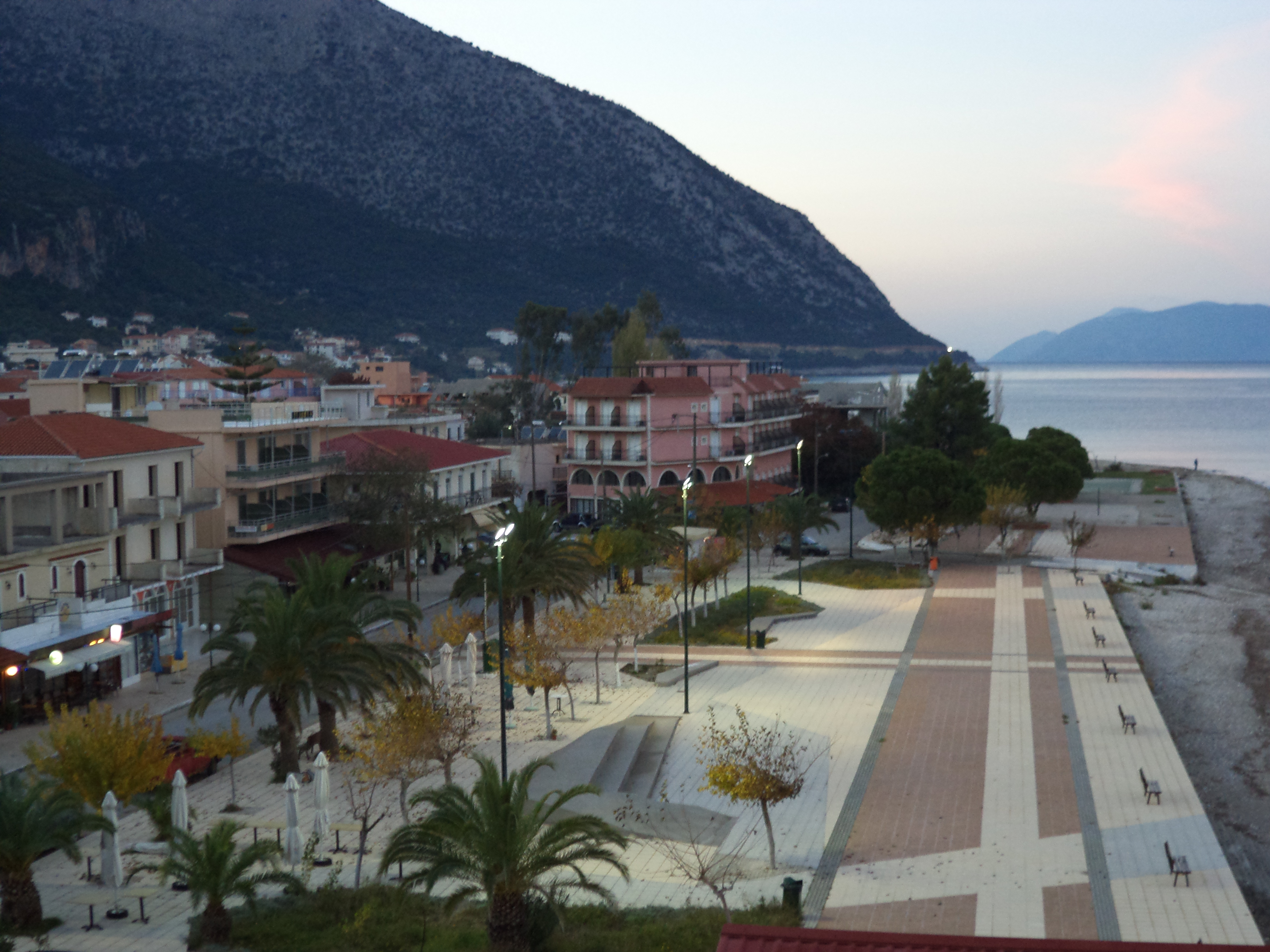

- Location within Greece
- Coordinates: 38°9′N 20°46′E
- Country: Greece
- Administrative region: Ionian Islands
- Regional unit: Cephalonia
- Municipality: Argostoli
- Municipal unit: Eleios-Pronnoi

Population (2021)
  - Community: 1,131
- Time zone: UTC+2 (EET)
  - Summer (DST): UTC+3 (EEST)

Poros (Greek: Πόρος) is a picturesque small town located in the municipal unit of Eleios-Pronnoi, some 40 km SE of Argostoli, 28 km SE of Sami and 12 km NE of Skala, in the southeast of Cephalonia, one of the Ionian Islands of Greece.

== Geography ==
The community of Poros consists of the villages:

- Poros
- Asprogerakas
- Kampitsata
- Riza
- Tzanata

Poros is effectively divided into three parts. Poros port, with its couple of tavernas and bars, connects the island with Kyllini on the Peloponnese area of mainland Greece via regular year-round ferry service. During the summer months a ferry may connect Poros with Zakynthos and a couple of tourist caiques offer cruises to Ithaca and the Blue Caves of Zakynthos. The harbour is also home to the local fishing boats which supply the area with fresh fish.

Separated from Poros port by a small hillock lies the shingle town beach, backed by a taverna-fringed square and main services: bank, chemist (pharmacy), doctor's surgery, post office, police station and local shops. More tavernas and bars lie along the award-winning 'Blue Flag' beach, Aragia, separated from the centre of Poros by the Vohinas river which, although used as a car park in summer, can be a raging torrent in winter.

The Vohinas almost certainly gave Poros its name. The word ‘poros’ in Greek means ‘ford’ or ‘crossing’ and where the Vohinas enters the sea is the only natural crossing point, although two bridges now cross the river further upstream where the Vohinas exits the impressive Poros gorge, an 80-metre deep rugged ravine which, until a road was cut through to Skala around 1996, was the only land route out of Poros. Local legend has it that the gorge was ‘cut’ by Heracles when he stood on, and flattened, this part of the mountain.

Another local legend concerns the large rocks just off the beach between Poros and Skala. Apparently these were thrown at early invaders by the Cyclops. The coastline on the other side of Poros, facing Ithaca, is one of the last refuges of the endangered Mediterranean Monk Seal (Monachus monachus).

Just out of the Poros gorge a rough vehicular track leads to the Atros monastery, the oldest on Cephalonia, with impressive views across Poros. Further along is another track leading to the Mycenaean tomb of Tzanata.

== History ==
Archaeological finds from the Drakaina cave in the beautiful gorge of Poros, which was excavated in recent years, confirm human habitation in Poros since 5,700 B.C. Interesting finds brought to light - tools made of stone and bone, figurines, pottery - tell us a good deal about the use of the cave in prehistoric and historic times. Finds from the Classical period indicate that the cave was then associated with the cult of the Nymphs. The name Drakena (She-Dragon) refers to the local legend of a dragon that lived in the gorge of Poros. In the popular imagination certain marks in the rocks on the side of the gorge were believed to be the dragon's foot prints. The area around Poros was certainly inhabited during the period when Mycenae was all-powerful, evidenced by the discovery, in 1991, of a tholos (Beehive tomb) in nearby Tzanata. The size of the tomb, the nature of the burial offerings found there and its well chosen position point to the existence of an important Mycenaean town in the vicinity. In the Archaeological Museum of Argostoli one can admire the major findings of the tholos tomb like golden bull horns, a golden double axe and engraved seals of precious stone. Although other tombs from the Mycenaean period have been found on the island, notably at Mazarakata and Lakithra, the Tzanata tomb is the most impressive yet to be discovered on Cephalonia or Ithaca.

During the classical period Poros was probably the port for the city of Pronnoi (above present-day Pastra, administrative centre for the area).

Successive occupiers - Romans, Franks, Venetians, Italians, French, Russians, Turks (very briefly) and finally the British (until 1834) - controlled Cephalonia and, under the governorship of Sir Charles Napier, settlers from Malta were re-located into the fertile area around Poros in an attempt to implement a model agricultural settlement and re-populate this part of the island. However, the plan did not work and Poros remained no more than a small cluster of fishermen's huts until 1953, when people built new homes there following the earthquake which devastated the surrounding villages, establishing Poros as a village community and, subsequently, an important port for the island.

== Agriculture ==
Situated beneath steep mountains, there is virtually no arable land in Poros. However, through the Poros gorge lies a fertile valley stretching between Tzanata, Agia Eirini and Agios Nikolaos.

== Fishing ==
Poros is a working fishing port, albeit for a handful of local ‘caique’-type boats which supply the local area. A new ice producing unit was added in 2006.

== Transportation ==
Year-round car-ferry service to Kyllini (mainland), (possible) summer service to Zakynthos.

Bus routes connect Poros to Argostoli, though routes operate infrequently. A long distance bus route also runs to Athens, via Kyllini, Patras and the Corinth Canal bridge. During the summer, seasonal bus services provide limited transit to Skala and Katelios.

Taxis tend to work out of Skala during summer. Car and motorcycle/scooter hire in Poros.

== Historical population ==
Year	Population village	Population community
1981	728	-
1991	756	-
2001	971	1,237
2011	930	1,176
2021	884	1,131

== See also ==
- List of settlements in Cephalonia
