= 1953 Ionian earthquake =

Extreme earthquake in the Greek Ionian Islands

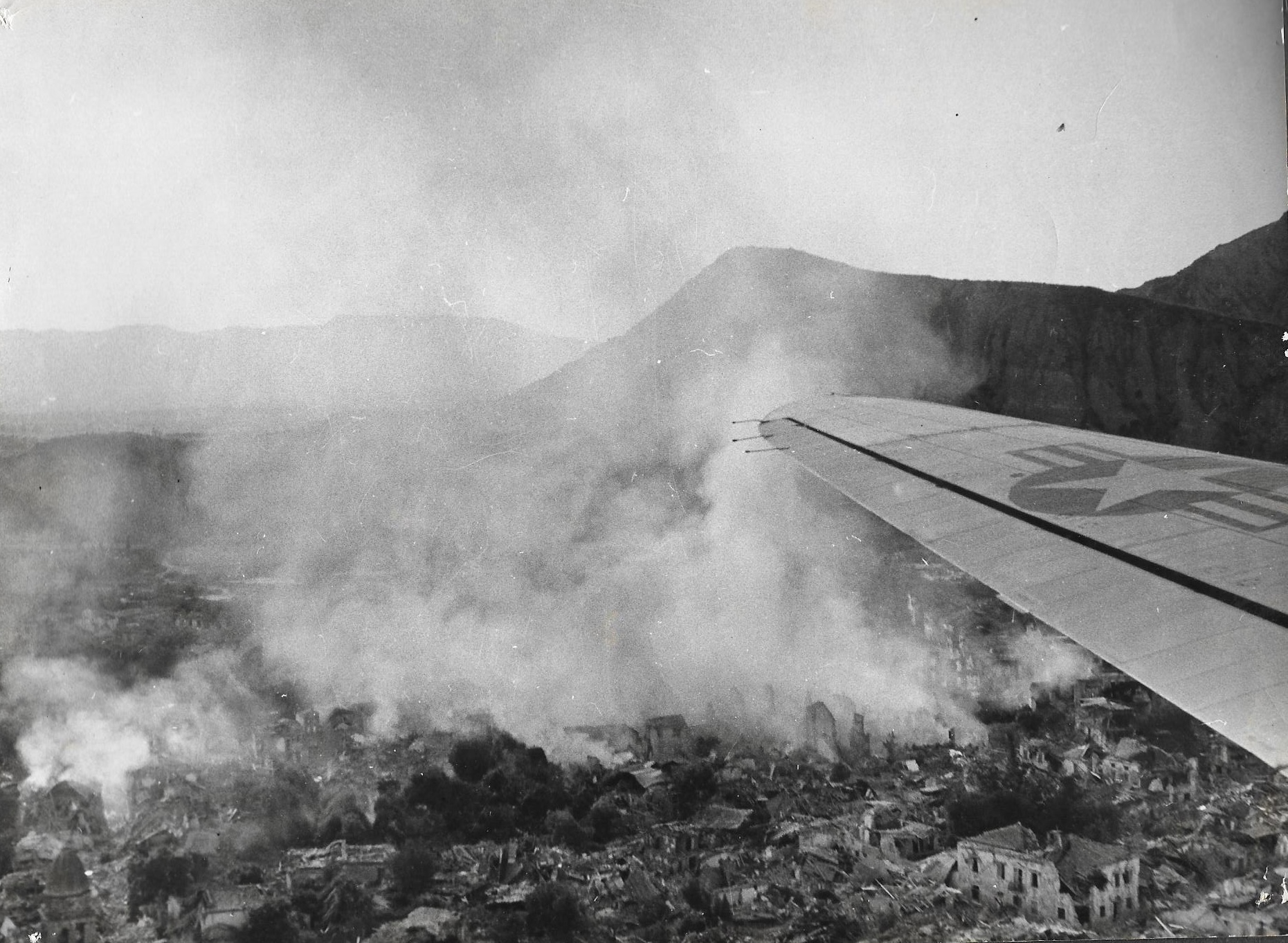
- Aerial view of destruction in Kefalonia

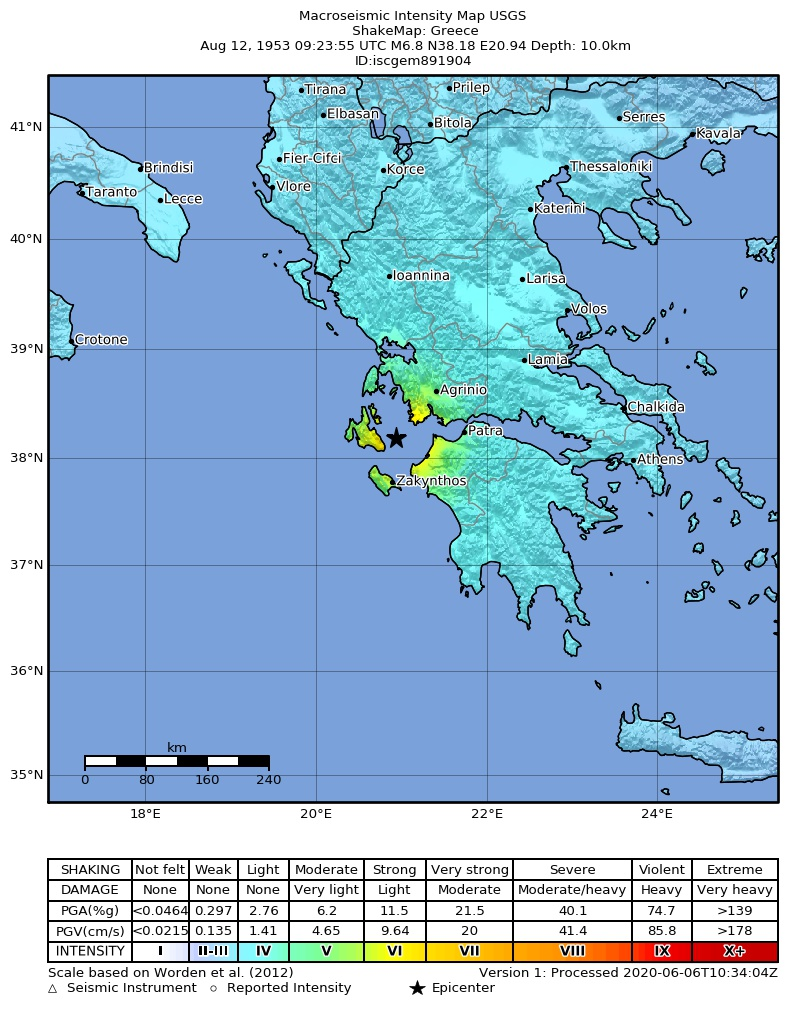

- Location within Greece
- UTC time: 1953-08-12 09:23:55
- ISC event: 891904
- USGS-ANSS: ComCat
- Local date: August 12, 1953
- Local time: 11:23:55
- Magnitude: 6.8 M_{w}^{(ISC)}
- Depth: 10 km (6 mi)
- Epicenter: 38.18°N 20.94°E
- Areas affected: Greece
- Max. intensity: MMI X (Extreme)
- Foreshocks: 6.3 M_{w}^{(ISC)} Aug 9 at 07:41; 6.5 M_{w}^{(ISC)} Aug 11 at 03:32
- Aftershocks: 6.2 M_{w}^{(ISC)} Aug 12 at 12:05
- Casualties: 445–800

The 1953 Ionian earthquake (also known as the Great Kefalonia earthquake) struck the southern Ionian Islands in Greece on August 12. In mid-August, there were over 113 recorded earthquakes in the region between Kefalonia and Zakynthos, and the most destructive was the August 12 earthquake. The event measured 6.8 on the moment magnitude scale, raised the whole island of Kefalonia by 60 cm (24 in), and caused widespread damage throughout the islands of Kefalonia and Zakynthos. The maximum felt intensity of shaking was X (extreme) on the Mercalli intensity scale. Between 445 and 800 people were killed.

== Earthquake ==
The earthquake struck at 09:23:55 (UTC) or 11:23:55 (local time); The USS Salem was the first vessel to arrive with humanitarian help, as it was on patrol in the area. Not long after the Royal Navy vessels HMS Gambia and HMS Bermuda arrived on the scene. In addition, four Israeli warships received calls for help coming from the island of Kefalonia and the ships headed to the island. The sailors provided emergency medical aid, food, and water. This was the first time Israel provided aid to a disaster-stricken area.

Although known as the "Great Kefalonia earthquake", damage was very heavy in Zakynthos' eponymous capital city. Only two buildings survived there; the rest of the island's capital had to be rebuilt. Argostoli, the capital of Kefalonia, suffered substantial damage and all of Kefalonia's buildings were flattened except for those in Fiskardo in the far north.

== Damage ==
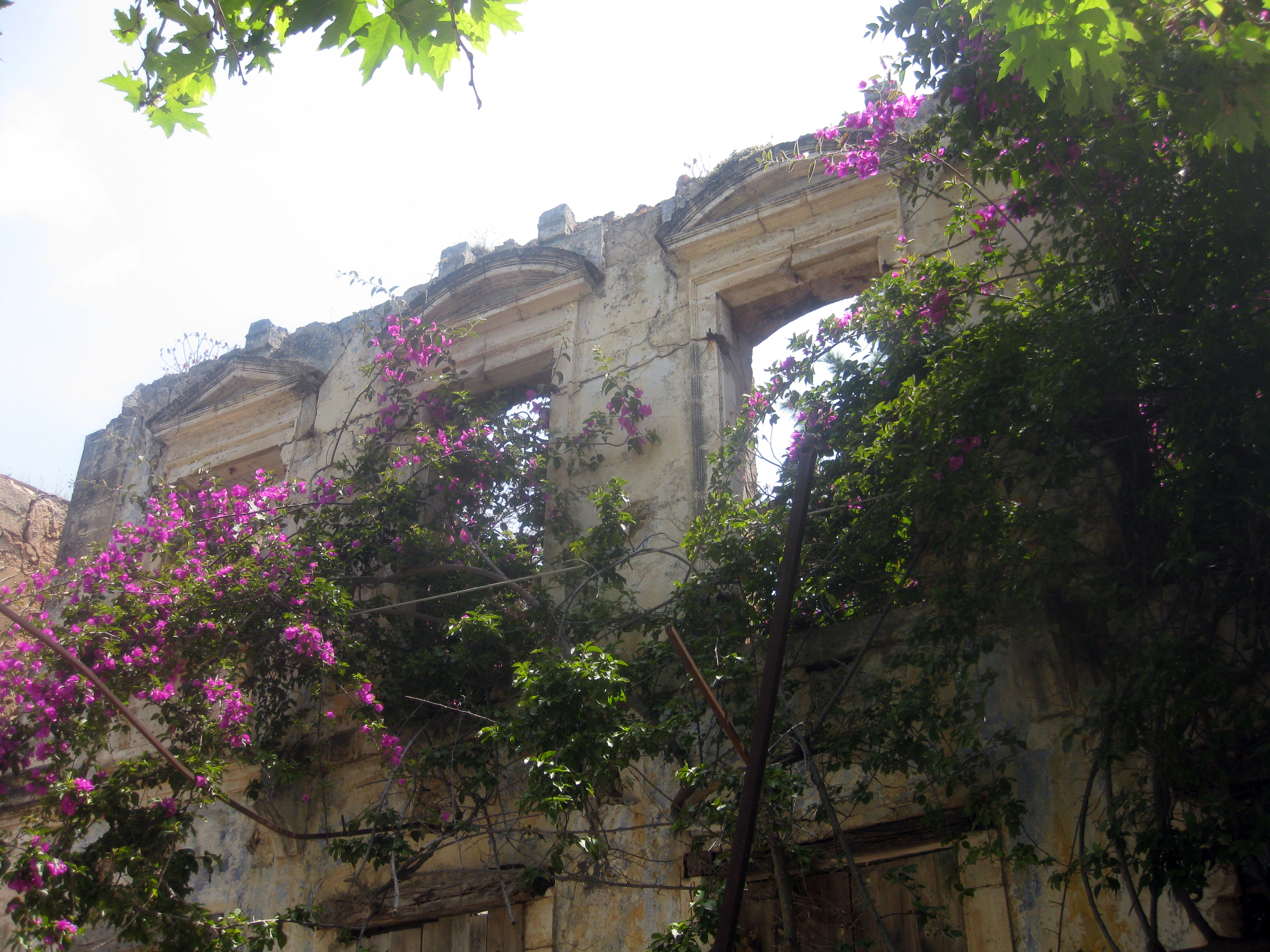
Damage still present in 2011

As well as causing major destruction on the two islands, the economic impact was far greater, and damage was estimated to have totaled billions of drachmas. Many people fled the island: some people temporarily moved to the capital, however the majority emigrated out of Greece entirely to countries such as Canada, USA, Australia or the UK, leaving both the islands and their economy in ruins.

On November 15, 1953, The Greek state issued a special set of 2 stamps dedicated to the earthquake. One stamp was of 300 drachmas value depicting the collapsing bell tower of the Faneromeni Church at Zakynthos. The other stamp, denominated at 500 drachmas, showed the damage to the famous De Bosset stone bridge at the Argostoli bay. The stamp set was issued in order to support financially the earthquake fund for the relief of those who had suffered.

An Italian mission of the National Fire and rescue Services (Corpo Nazionale dei Vigili del Fuoco) was sent to help people and save heritage artifacts.

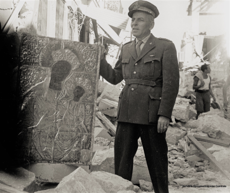
An Officer of the Italian National Fire and rescue Services (Corpo Nazionale dei Vigili del Fuoco) and an icon of St. Mary and Child recovered from a collapsed church in Zante after the 1953 earthquake. Credits: CNVVF – Centro Documentazione

== Aftermath ==
Earthquakes still regularly affect the islands of Zakynthos and Kefalonia, including several 2006 earthquakes in Zakynthos and others in 2003 and 2005. There were also several large earthquakes on January 26 and February 3, 2014, measuring 6.1 and 6.0 on the Richter scale. The epicenters of both were in Kefalonia at very shallow depths and caused damage in the island. On October 25, 2018, there was a 6.8 magnitude earthquake off the coast that damaged parts of the Zante port docks. Following that quake, there were more than 50 additional quakes over 4 magnitude in the Ionian Sea between the 25th and the end of October.

== See also ==
- List of earthquakes in 1953
- List of earthquakes in Greece
