= Argostoli =

Town in Kefalonia, Greece

Argostoli Αργοστόλι
- Municipality
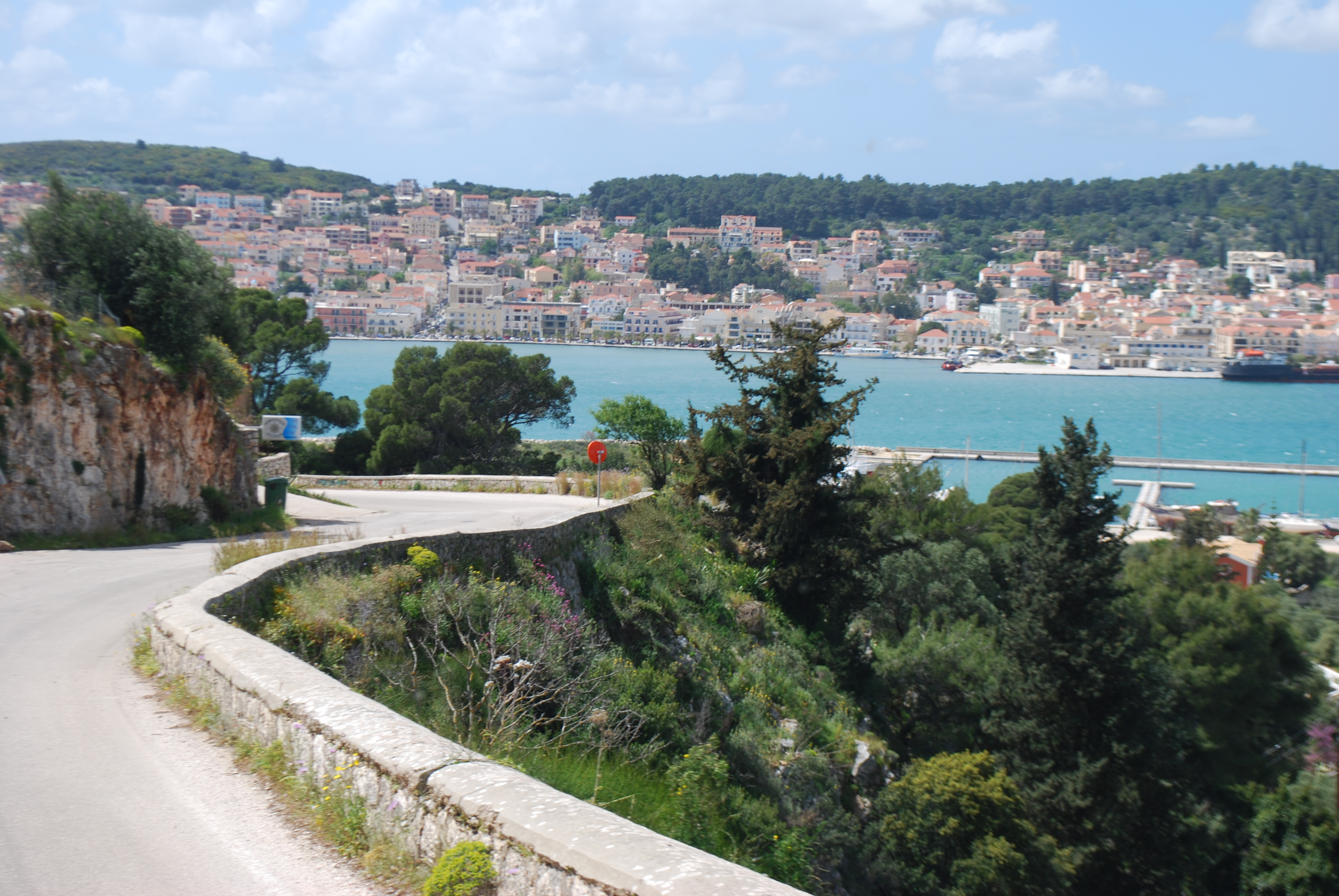
- View of Argostoli

- Seal

- Location within the regional unit

- Location within Greece
- Coordinates: 38°10′24″N 20°29′27″E
- Country: Greece
- Administrative region: Ionian Islands
- Regional unit: Kefalonia

Area
  - Municipality: 377.0 km^{2} (145.6 sq mi)
  - Municipal unit: 151.670 km^{2} (58.560 sq mi)
- Elevation: 23 m (75 ft)

Population (2021)
  - Municipality: 23,574
  - Density: 62.53/km^{2} (162.0/sq mi)
  - Municipal unit: 13,666
  - Municipal unit density: 90.104/km^{2} (233.37/sq mi)
  - Community: 10,982
- Time zone: UTC+2 (EET)
  - Summer (DST): UTC+3 (EEST)
- Postal code: 281 00
- Area code: 26710
- Vehicle registration: ΚΕ
- Website: www.argostoli.gr

Argostoli (Greek: Αργοστόλι, romanized: Argostóli, Katharevousa: Ἀργοστόλιον, romanized: Argostólion) is a town and a municipality on the island of Kefalonia, Ionian Islands, Greece. Since the 2019 local government reform it is one of the three municipalities on the island. It has been the capital and administrative centre of Kefalonia since 1757, following a population shift down from the old capital of Agios Georgios, also known as Kastro, to take advantage of the trading opportunities provided by the sheltered bay upon which Argostoli sits.

Argostoli developed into one of the busiest ports in Greece, leading to prosperity and growth. The municipality has an area of 377.0 km^{2} and the municipal unit (the pre-2010 municipality) has an area of 157.670 km^{2}. The 2021 census recorded a population of 13,666 in the Argostoli municipal unit, and 23,574 in the municipality in its post-2019 extension.

== Urban landscape ==
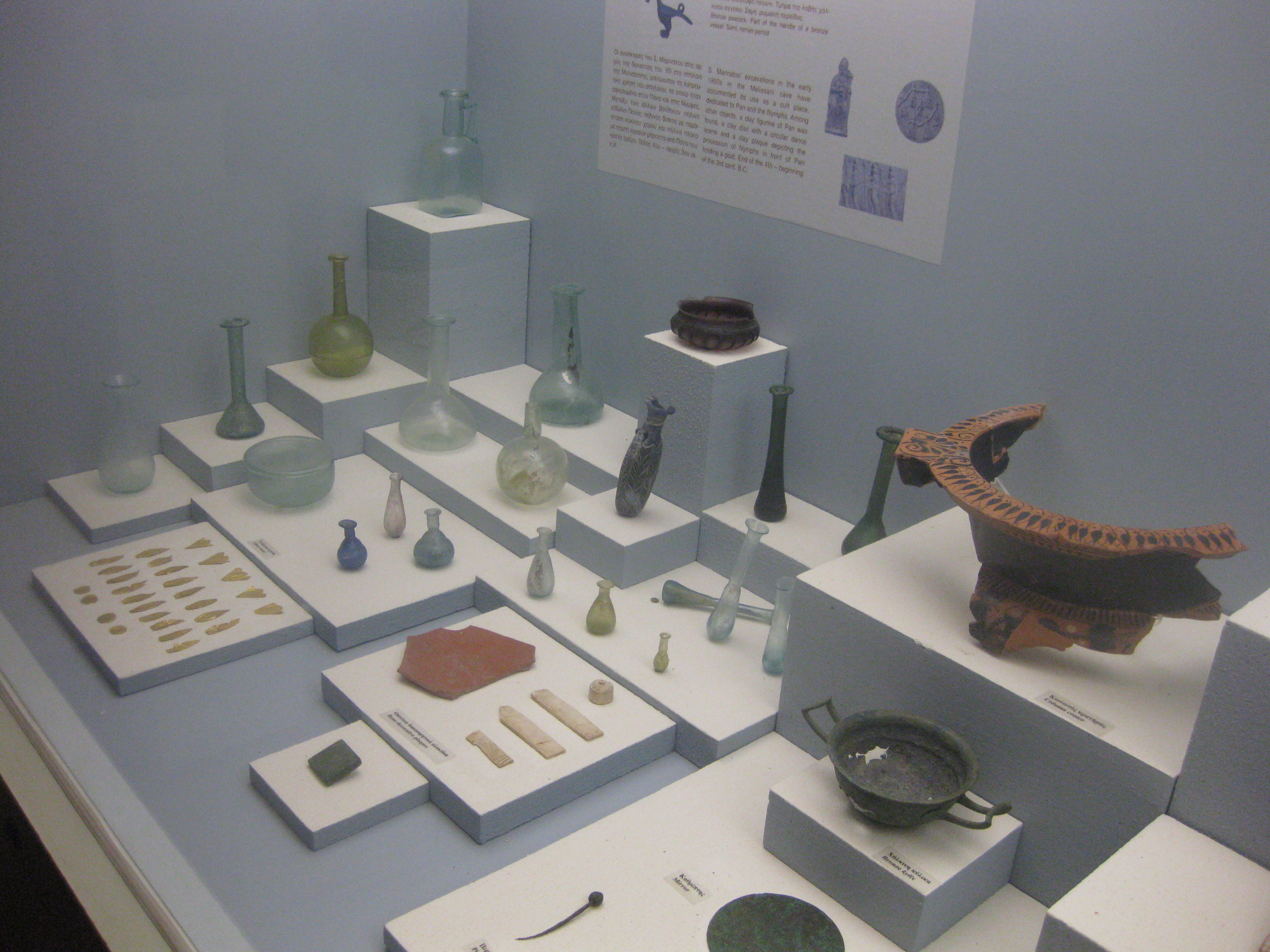
Exhibits at the Archaeological Museum of Argostoli

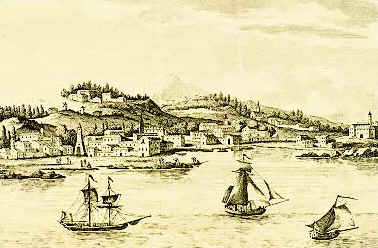
Gravour of Argostoli, c. 1757

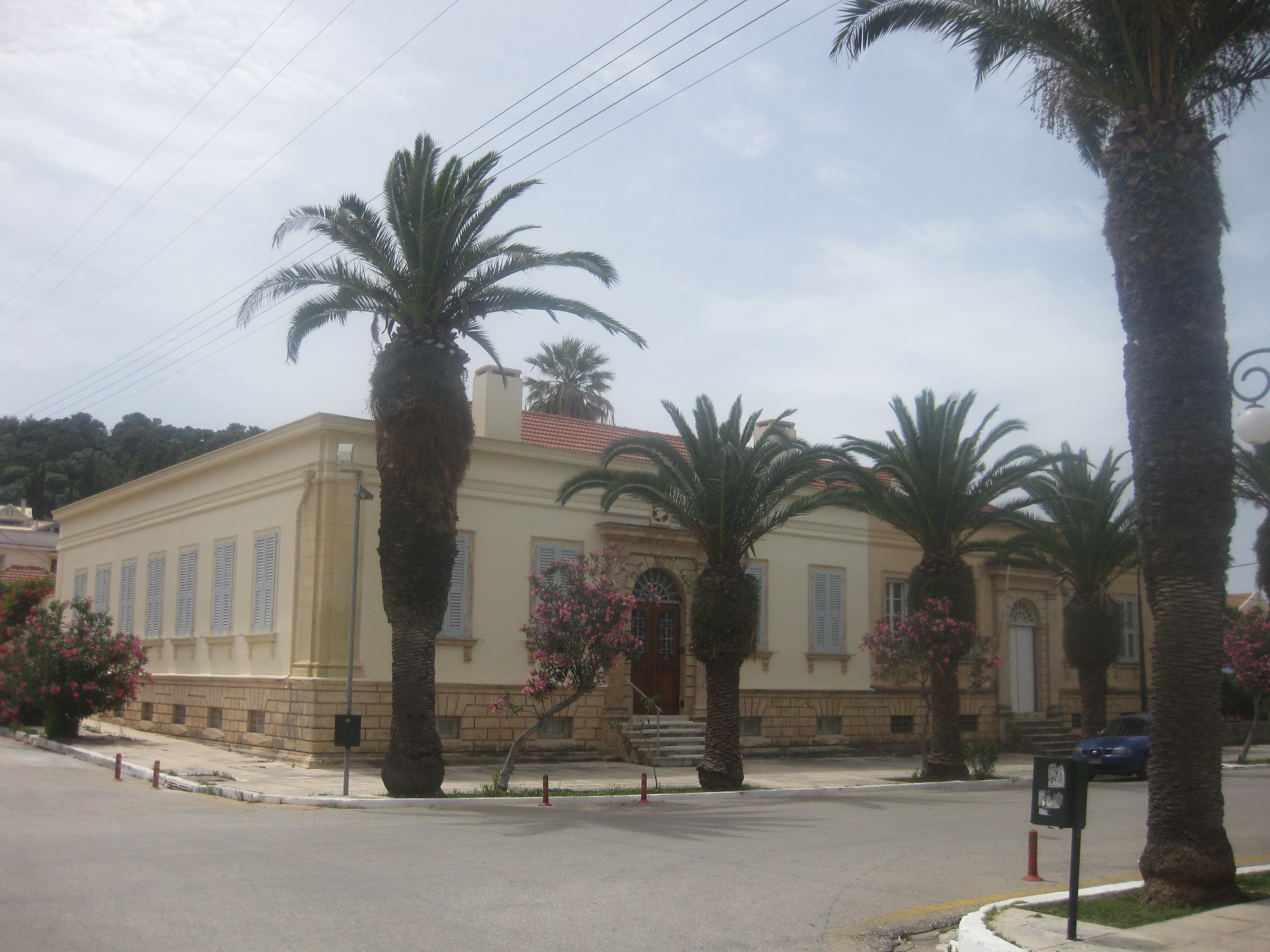
Houses of Argostoli

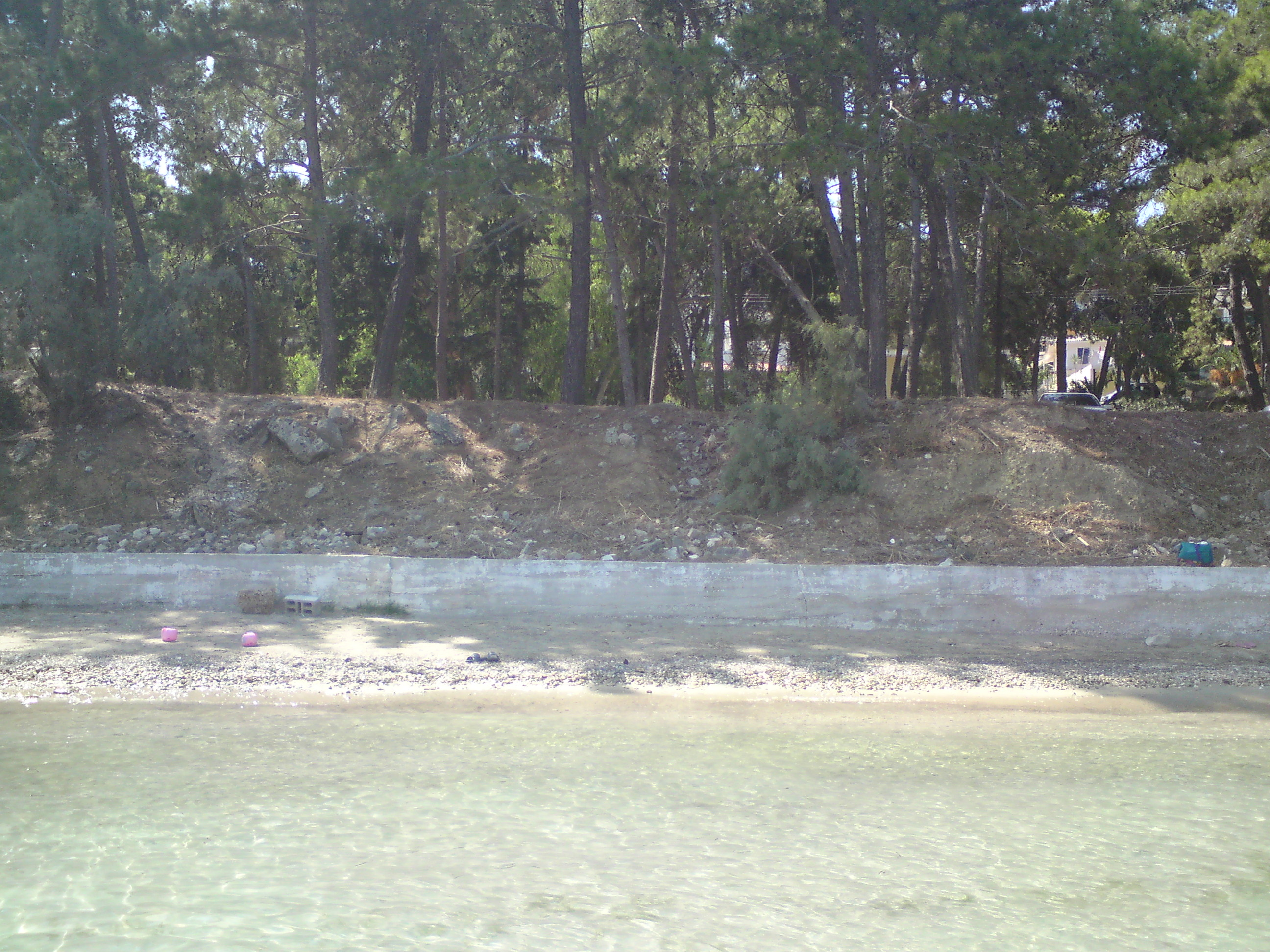
Maistrato beach

To the east of Argostoli, at the end of the bay, beneath the aforementioned Castle of St. George, sits the Koutavos Lagoon, a feeding ground for the Loggerhead turtles (Caretta caretta). Now a nature reserve, the Koutavos Lagoon was once an almost impassable swamp where mosquitoes and malaria were rife.

During the period of British occupation of the Ionian Islands, Kefalonia's governor, General Sir Charles James Napier, constructed a wooden bridge across the lagoon. This was done in 1813 by Colonel Charles Philip de Bosset, a Swiss engineer in the employ of the British army. Four years later stone arches were added and, after some 26 years, the entire bridge was rebuilt in stone. In continuous use until 2005, this narrow bridge is now closed to traffic, currently undergoing renovation by the Greek Ministry of Culture. Almost halfway along the De-Bosset Bridge stands a stone column built by the British to celebrate their presence.

The coastal road out of Argostoli to the west was known during the Venetian period as the ‘Piccolo Gyro’. Along the Piccolo Gyro, in the Vlikha area facing Lixouri, lie the ‘Swallow Holes’ of Katovothres, a geological phenomenon. Sea water disappears underground and travels under the island, re-emerging around fourteen days later in the Karavomylos area of Sami, having passed through the nearby, underground Melissani lake. The power of this sea water was harnessed, in 1835, to power a water mill. Further along the Piccolo Gyro is the Agion Theodoron lighthouse, named after the small adjacent church. More commonly known as the Fanari lighthouse, this too was built during the British occupation, in 1829. The original building was destroyed in the earthquake of 1953, the recently restored present structure was rebuilt, complete with Doric-style columns, from the original plans.

Buildings that weren't shattered by German bombing in 1943 were destroyed in 1953 by the earthquake that razed virtually all of Kefalonia, apart from the Fiskardo area, to the ground.

Opposite the Archaeological Museum of Argostoli are the law courts, originally constructed by the British with stone from the Cyclopean site at nearby Krani. Along Lithostroto, next to the Catholic Church, is a tiny museum (open some mornings and most evenings) dedicated to the soldiers of the Acqui Division. A little further along is the Bell Tower, rebuilt in 1985 to house the original clock mechanism.

On the Ionian Sea coast southwest of the town centre is the holiday resort town Lassi, which has several small beaches.

== Subdivisions ==
Following the Kapodistrias reform of 1997, communities around the town united to form a larger municipality of Argostoli, which included the settlements of Spilia, Helmata, Kompothekrata, Lassi, Minies and ten former communities: Agona, Davgata, Dilinata, Zola, Thinia, Kourouklata, Nifi, Troyiannata, Faraklata and Farsa. As a result of the 2010 Kallikratis Programme, this municipality became a municipal unit of the municipality of Kefalonia, which covered the whole island. In 2019 three new municipalities were formed on the island, including Argostoli.

The municipality of Argostoli consists of the following municipal units (former municipalities):

- Argostoli
- Eleios-Pronnoi
- Leivatho
- Omala

The municipal unit of Argostoli is subdivided into the following communities. Constituent villages are given in brackets:

- Agkonas
- Argostoli (Argostoli, Kokolata, Kompothekrata, Minia)
- Davgata
- Dilinata
- Faraklata (Faraklata, Drapano, Prokopata, Razata)
- Farsa
- Thinaia (Kardakata)
- Kourouklata
- Nyfi
- Troianata (Troianata, Demoutsantata, Mitakata)
- Zola

== Transportation ==
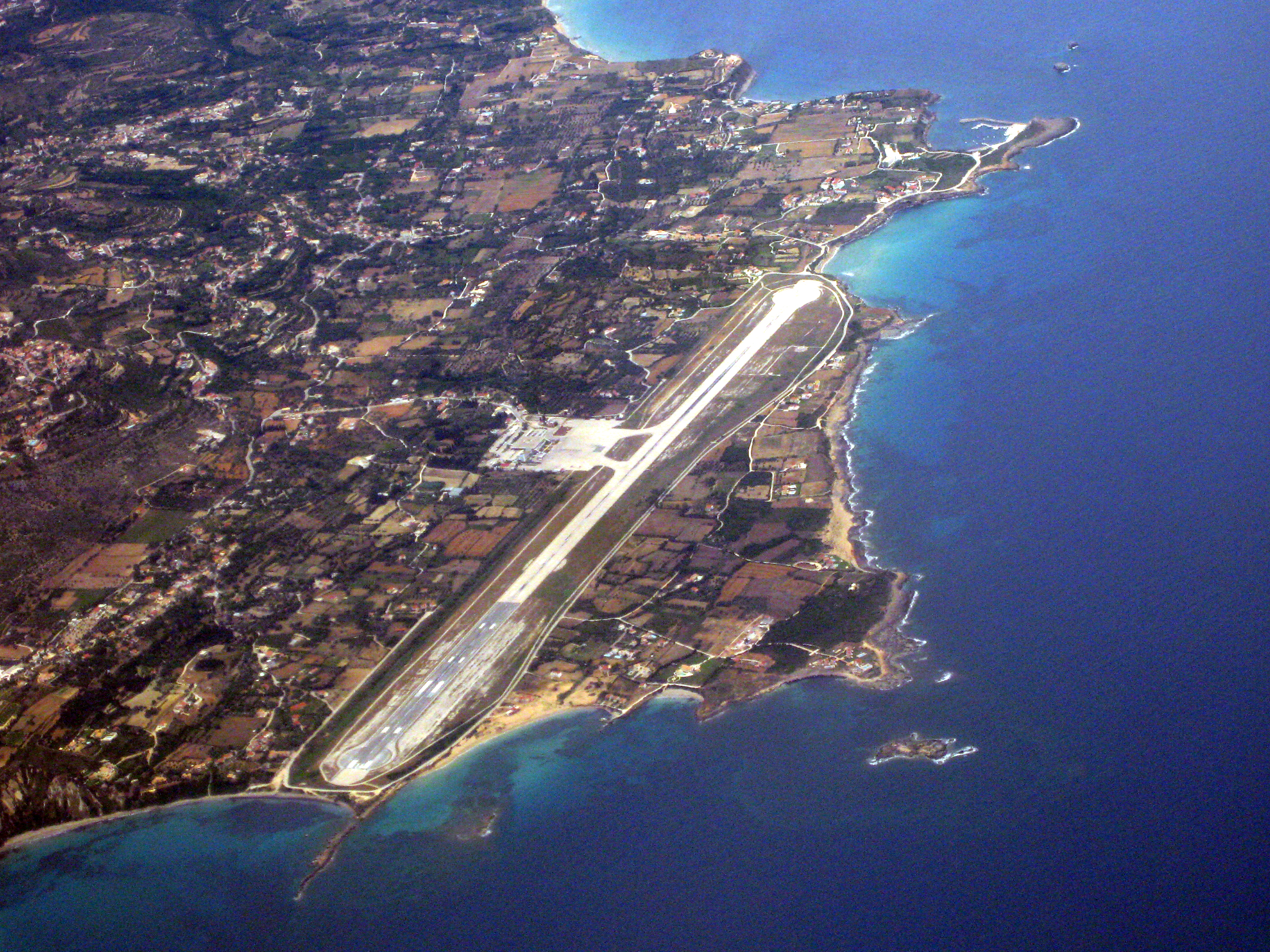
Aerial view of the airport.

Between the Koutavos Lagoon and the De-Bosset Bridge is the new bus station which connects Argostoli with the other towns and some of the villages on the island, as well as with Athens and Patras. The main ferry port, connecting Argostoli with the mainland (via Kyllini) and Zakynthos (also known as Zante) is next to this building with the Lixouri ferry (once an hour in winter, twice an hour in summer) docking a little further along.

- Car ferry service to Kyllini (mainland) and Zakynthos (Zante)
- Car ferry to Lixouri
- KTEL Bus service to Athens, via Kyllini, Patras and the Corinth Canal bridge
- Infrequent bus service to Poros, Sami, Skala, Fiskardo and various villages en route
- Frequent summer service to Lassi, Airport & Ai Chelis, Lourdas, Ammes, Myrtos & Antisamos.
- Transit bus service is provided between the Airport and the city of Argostoli (only during summer season). There is a public bus stop in front of the terminal building. Tickets can be purchased by the bus driver.
- Scheduled flights to Zakynthos and Athens, charter flight in summer, via Kefalonia Airport
- Taxis from Plateia Valianos and seafront, car and motorcycle/scooter hire

== Climate ==
Argostoli has a hot-summer Mediterranean climate (Köppen: Csa) with hot, dry summers and cool, rainy winters.

Climate data for Argostoli (1970–2010)
Month	Jan	Feb	Mar	Apr	May	Jun	Jul	Aug	Sep	Oct	Nov	Dec	Year
Mean daily maximum °C (°F)	14.5 (58.1)	14.3 (57.7)	16.0 (60.8)	18.6 (65.5)	23.0 (73.4)	26.9 (80.4)	29.3 (84.7)	29.9 (85.8)	26.9 (80.4)	23.2 (73.8)	19.0 (66.2)	15.7 (60.3)	21.4 (70.5)
Daily mean °C (°F)	11.4 (52.5)	11.4 (52.5)	12.9 (55.2)	15.6 (60.1)	19.7 (67.5)	23.7 (74.7)	25.9 (78.6)	26.3 (79.3)	23.4 (74.1)	19.8 (67.6)	15.9 (60.6)	12.8 (55.0)	18.2 (64.8)
Mean daily minimum °C (°F)	8.5 (47.3)	8.3 (46.9)	9.3 (48.7)	11.3 (52.3)	14.6 (58.3)	18.3 (64.9)	20.8 (69.4)	21.4 (70.5)	19.0 (66.2)	16.1 (61.0)	12.7 (54.9)	9.8 (49.6)	14.2 (57.6)
Average precipitation mm (inches)	113.3 (4.46)	101.3 (3.99)	69.4 (2.73)	51.6 (2.03)	17.2 (0.68)	8.6 (0.34)	6.0 (0.24)	9.4 (0.37)	46.5 (1.83)	94.7 (3.73)	147.3 (5.80)	147.0 (5.79)	812.3 (31.98)
Average precipitation days	14.1	13.4	10.7	9.0	4.7	1.8	0.8	1.6	5.4	10.0	12.9	15.4	99.8
Average relative humidity (%)	72.8	71.7	71.3	70.8	70.1	66.2	63.9	65.5	69.2	71.0	74.6	74.1	70.1
Source: Hellenic National Meteorological Service

== Historical population ==
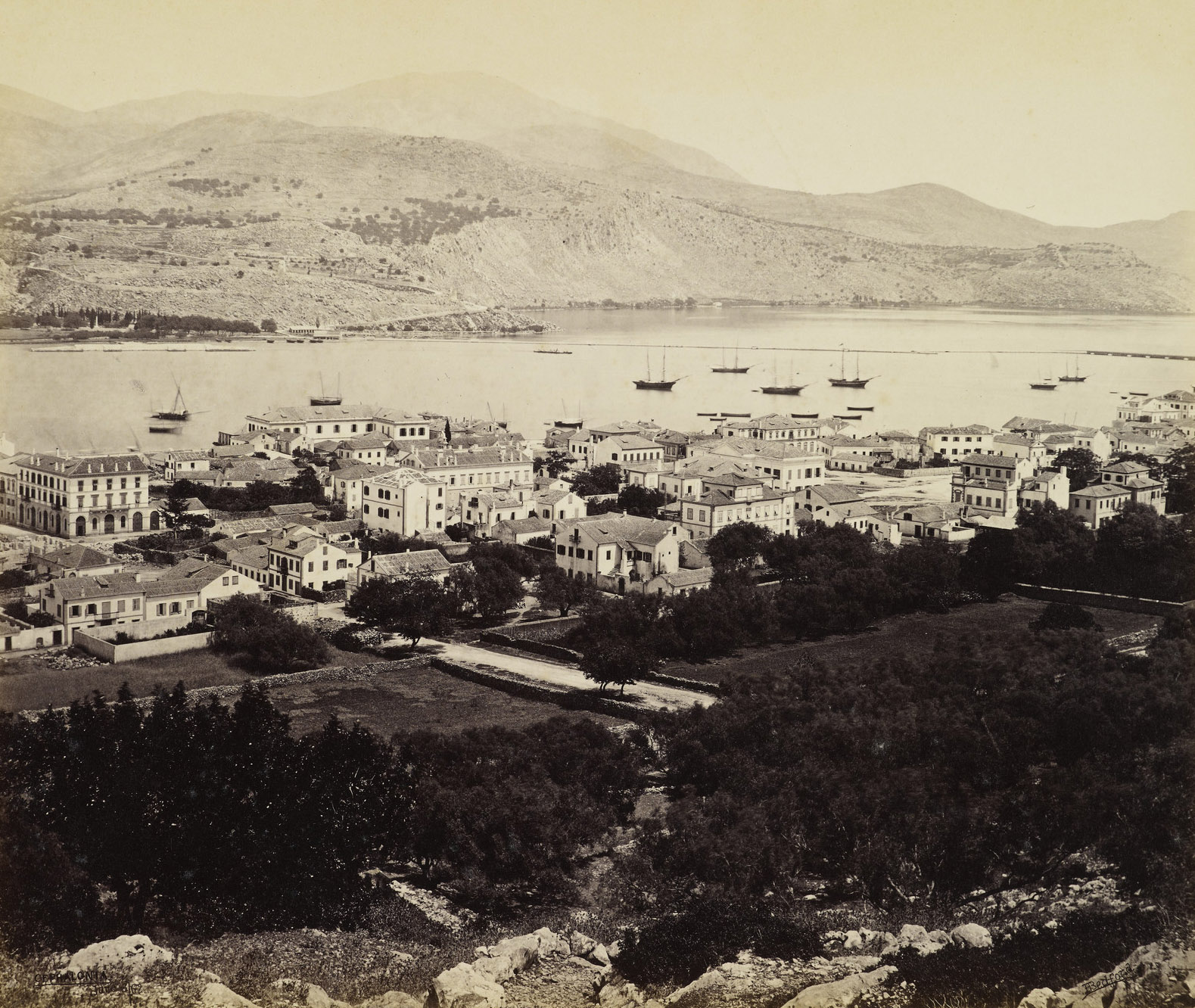
Photograph by Francis Bedford, 1862

Year	Community	Municipal unit
1981	7,164	–
1991	7,420	9,918
2001	9,593	12,503
2011	10,633	13,237
2021	10,982	13,666

== Notable people ==
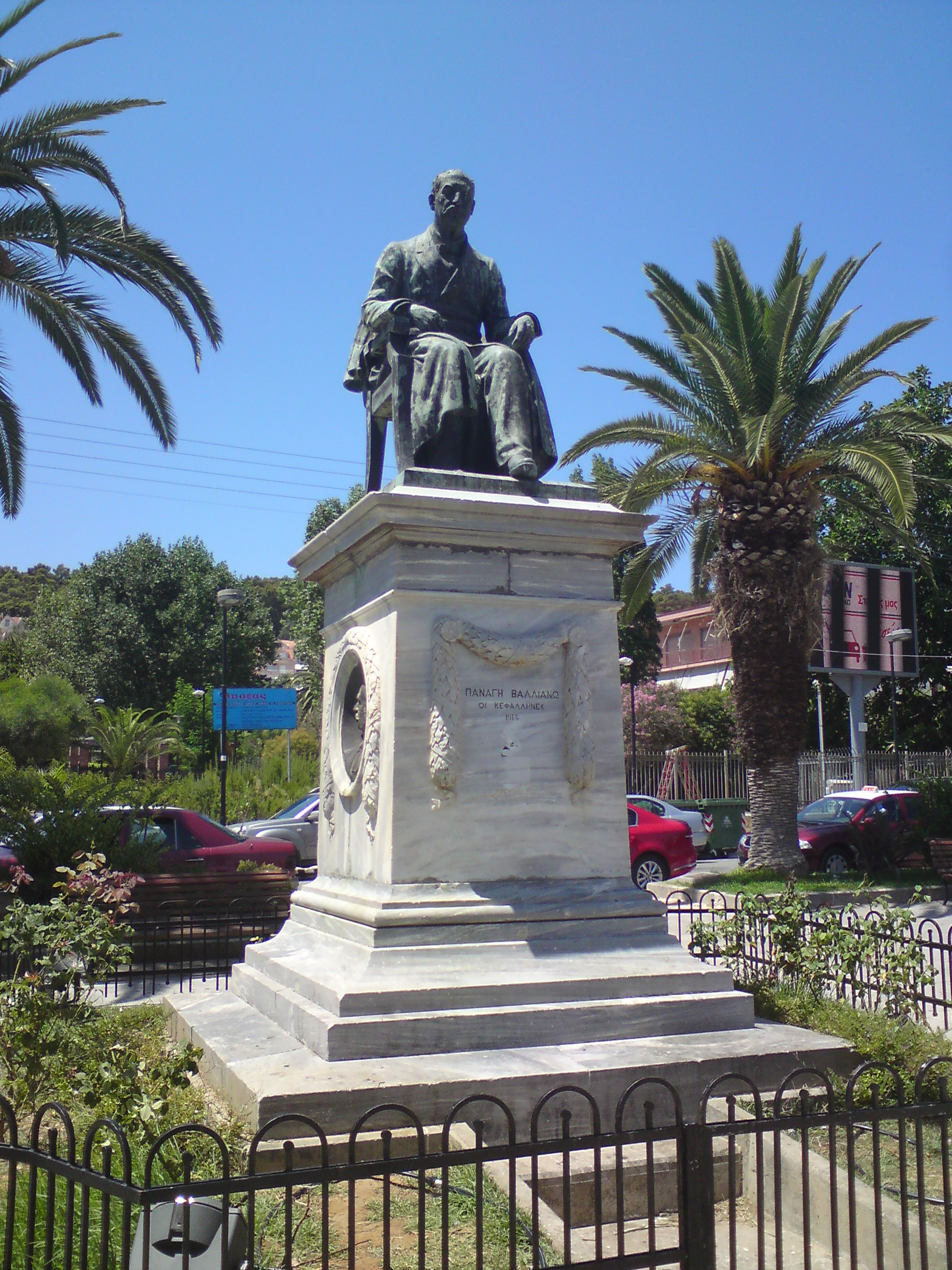
Statue of Panayis Athanase Vagliano, merchant and shipowner from Kefalonia, in Argostoli.

- Constantine Phaulkon (1647–1688), merchant and adventurer
- Ioannis Karantinos (1784 -1834), Greek mathematician
- Andreas Metaxas (1786–1860), politician
- Gerasimos Pitzamanos (1787–1825), painter and architect
- Ioannis Metaxas (1871–1941), general, politician and dictator
- Christian Zervos (1889–1970), art collector, writer and publisher
- Aris Maliagros (1895–1984), actor
- Renée Toole Kahane (1907-2002), philologist
- Gerasimos Arsenis (1931–2016), politician
- Antonis Tritsis (1937–1992), mayor of Athens
- Athanassios S. Fokas (born 1952), Greek mathematician

== International relations ==
Argostoli is twinned with:

- Šabac in Serbia.
- Brăila in Romania.

== Argostoli–Lixouri rivalry ==
The rivalry between Argostoli and Lixouri, two major cities on the island, located approximately 40 kilometres (25 mi) apart on the same bay, is now primarily cultural and sporting in nature, though it has historical and economic roots. Historically, Lixouri was the island's cultural centre, home to a Catholic bishopric, and was renowned for its beautiful beaches. In contrast, Argostoli has long been the administrative and economic hub of the island. The folkloric rivalry between the two cities traditionally originated during the carnival season. Local residents of Argostoli often advise visitors not to go to Lixouri, claiming "there is nothing to see."

== See also ==
- List of settlements in Kefalonia
