= Melissani Cave =

Cave located on the island of Kefalonia, Greece

Coordinates: 38.257°N 20.6236°E

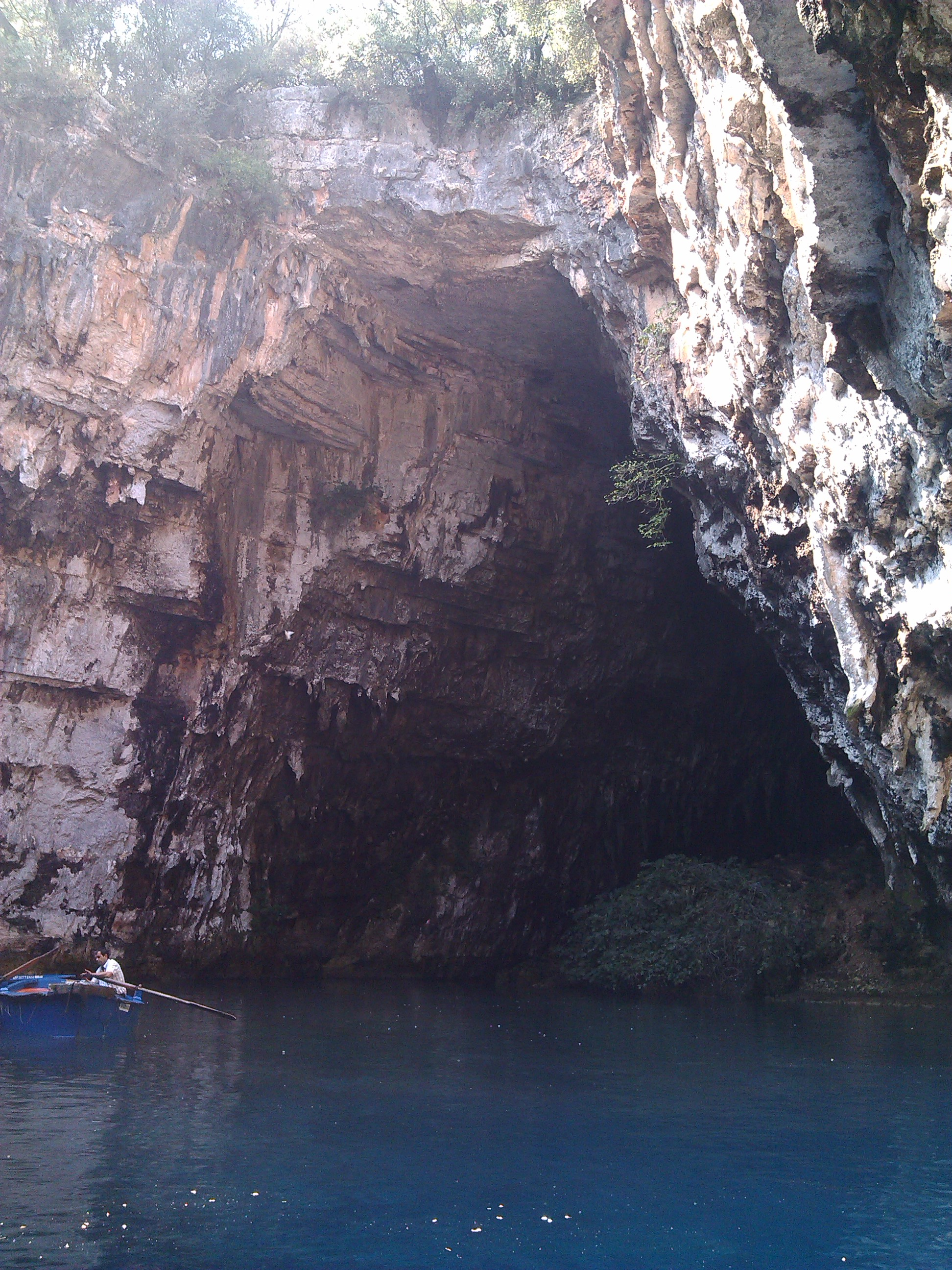
covered part of the cave

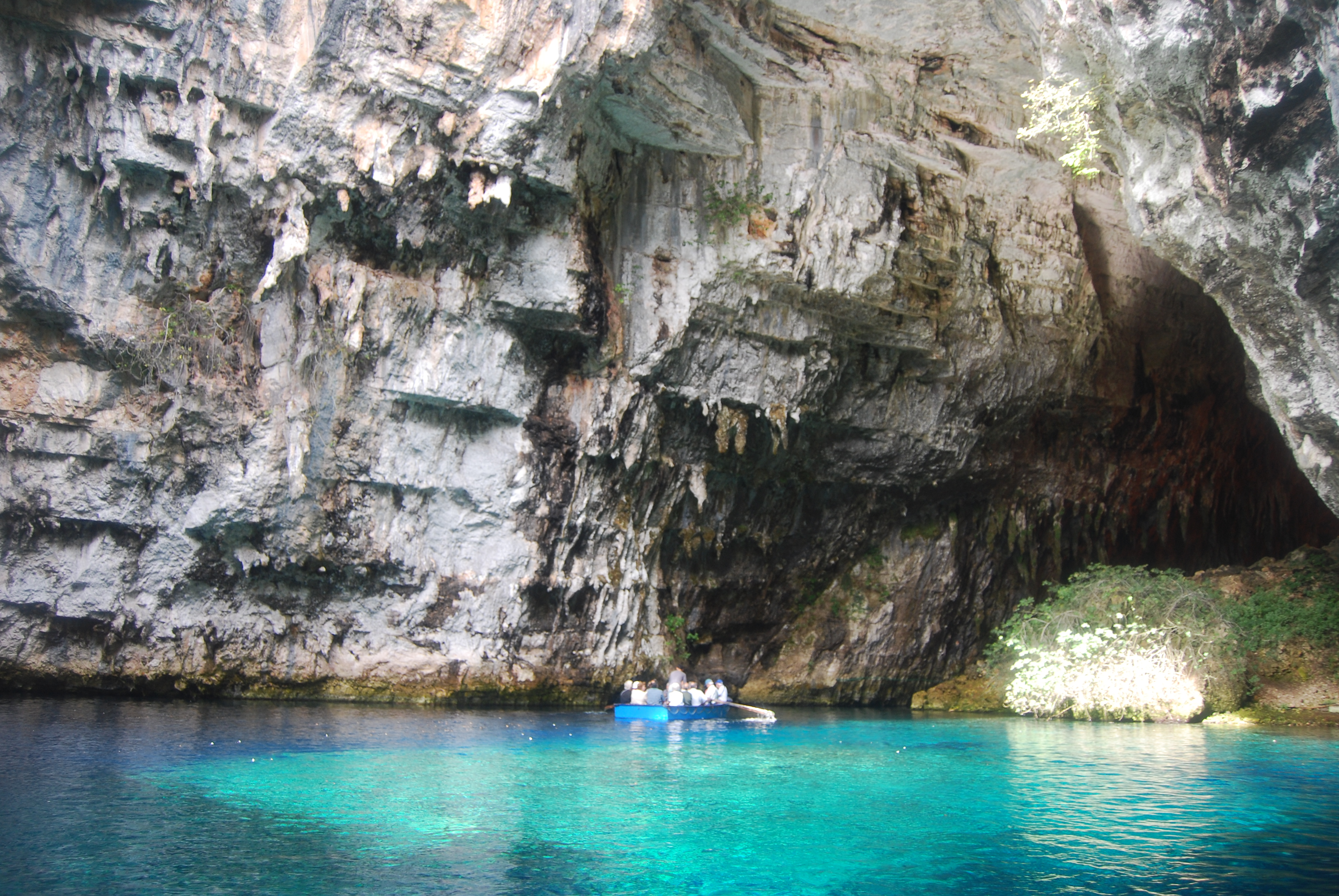
Melissani Cave

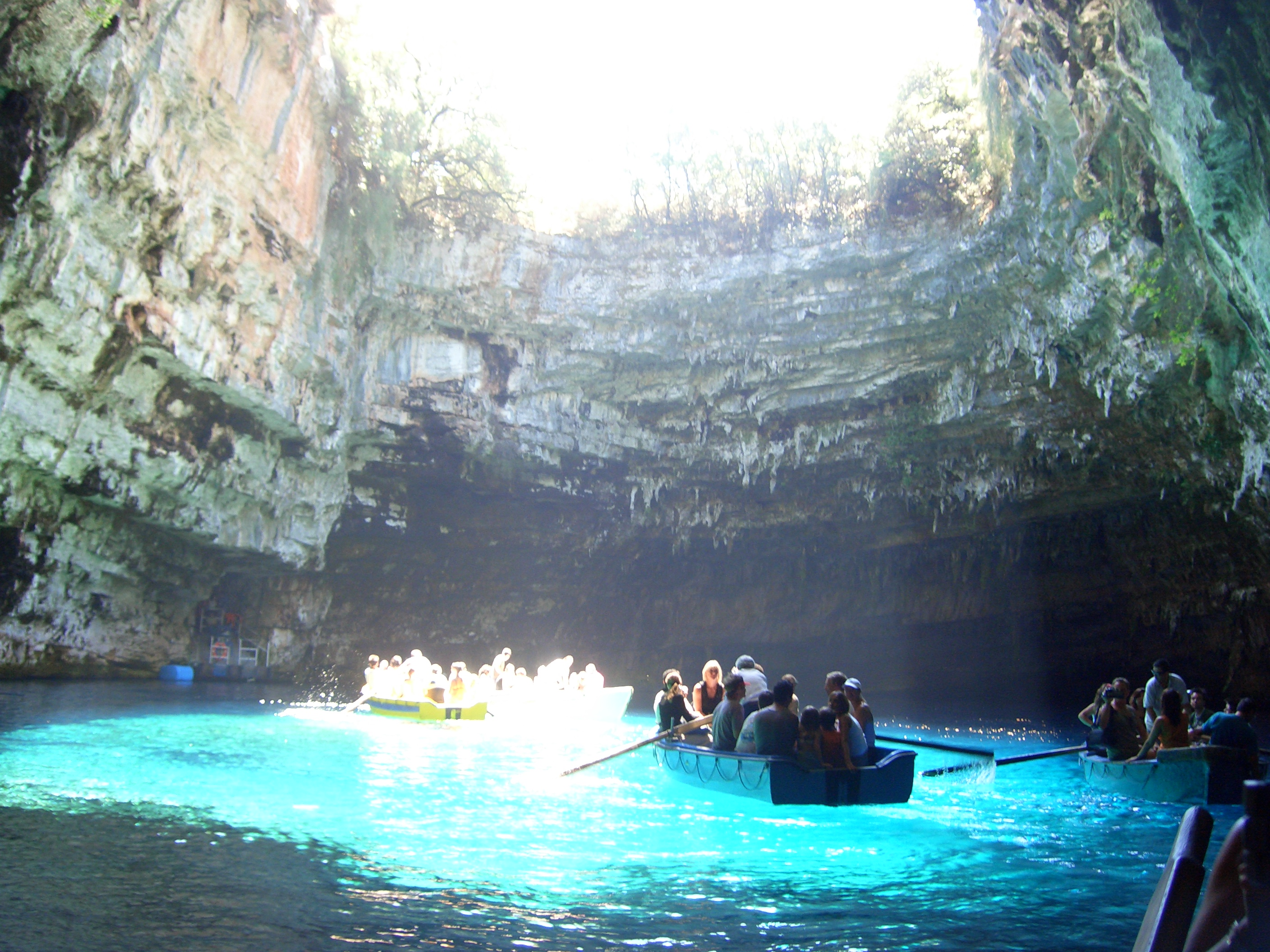
The Lake Melissani under noonday sun

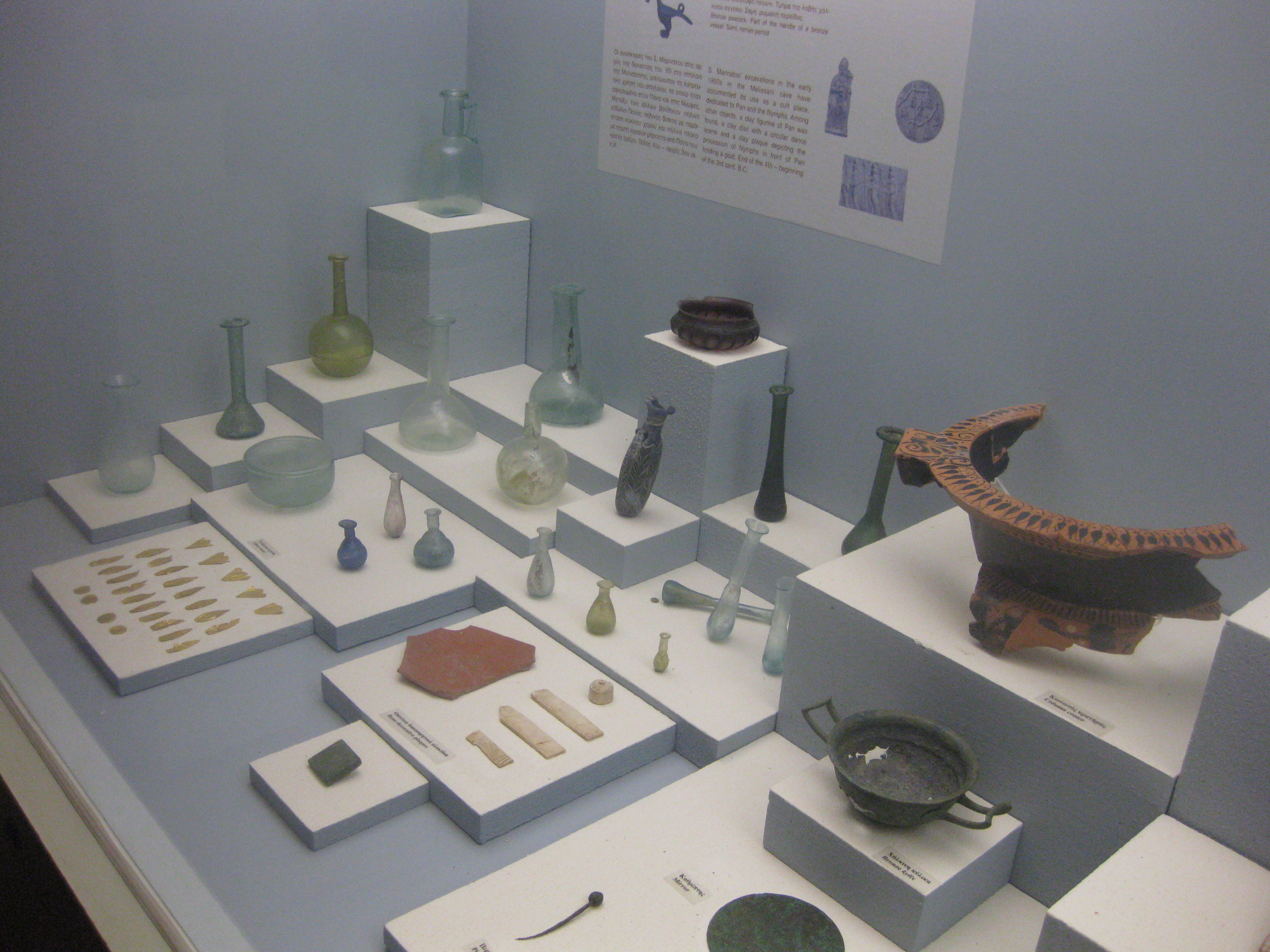
Excavations from Melissani, made under Spyridon Marinatos. Today in the Archaeological Museum of Argostoli

Melissani Cave (Greek: Λιμνοσπήλαιο Μελισσάνης) or Melissani Lake, also Melisani is a cave and cenote located on the island of Kefalonia, northwest of Sami, about 5 km (3.1 mi) Southeast of Agia Effimia, Northeast of Argostoli and Northwest of Poros. This sinkhole was created when a collapse of limestone bedrock exposed groundwater in 1953, creating the cenote. The Ionian Sea lies to the east with the Strait of Ithaca. Forests surround the cave and the mountain slope is to the west. Near the cave is the entry to the cave with parking lots and is passed almost in the middle of the main road linking Sami and Agia Efimia especially to the northern part of the island. Some say the water is so clear the boats look like they are floating on air.

== Nearest places ==
- Agia Effimia, north
- Karavomylos, south

== Geography ==
- Location:
  - Longitude: 20.6 (20°37′25″) E
  - Latitude: 38.26 (38°15′25″) N
- Elevation: Ionian Sea

== Information ==
In Greek mythology, Melissani was the Cave of the Nymphs. It features a lake surrounded with trees and forest, and is located east of the mountains of Evmorfia and Agia Dynati. Tourism is common.

The lake's bottom is covered with stones. Plants grow at the opening of the cave. The color of the stone near the opening is stucco to honey-like brown.

The cave was rediscovered in 1951.

== Hydrogeology ==
Melissani cave is a typical feature of karst environment in coastal carbonate aquifer. It forms a kind of cenote, as described in the Yucatán peninsula (Mexico). The vertical shaft gives access to the water table (where you can do a round trip on a small boat). This groundwater is brackish, mixing between fresh water recharge inland and sea water intruded in depth in the island. Huge karst conduits have been explored by speleo-divers. The bay of Sami has many cenotes, with impressive shafts, that have been inventoried in a GIS Database [see external links]. The brackish water flowing through the cenotes outflows along the sea shore, forming brackish coastal and submarine springs. The groundwater of Melissani cave outflows at the "Fridi" beach. This brackish water is part of a famous hydrogeological phenomena : seawater is sucked in the west part of the island of Kefalonia, near Argostoli, and expelled in the bay of Sami. In Argostoli, the seawater flows into sinkholes, named katavothres, where water mill turns.

== See also ==
- List of caves in Greece
