= Cangelari family =

Ancient Greek aristocratic family

The Cangelari family (in Greek: Καγγελάρη or Καγκελάρη) is one of Cephalonia, Greece's most ancient aristocratic families.

== General information ==
Of Byzantine origin according to tradition and a family of warriors and priests at the outset, its members will later distinguish themselves in the fields of trade, shipping, arts and letters. Their surname is mentioned for the first time by the mid-12th century in the person of a great Byzantine hagiographer of that era Luca Cancellari (in Greek: Λουκάς Καγκελλάρης), to whom are assigned the oldest and best icons of Virgin Mary and who is often confused with the Apostle Luke. Etymologically it goes back to the Latin cancellarius, which means "chief secretary" or "chancellor", designates an office and thus in its original form must have been Cangellarios (in Greek: Καγκελλάριος). After the fall of Constantinople they fled to Corfu, from where they migrated in the early 16th century to settle at the village Vari in the region of Erisso, in Cephalonia, where they were entrusted with the military command of the region. Their inscription in the Golden Book of the island (in Italian: Libro d'Oro) is recorded in 1652, however, members of the family participated already before 1560 to the Council of Notables (in Italian: Conseglio dei Primarii) and later to the Community Council (in Italian: Conseglio della Communità) of Cephalonia. In the 16th century they will migrate to other parts of the island (St. George Castle, Pirgo, Plagia, Vassilikades, Asso, Cothria) and in the 17th and 18th centuries at Sami (Alevrata, Grizata, Zervata), Lixouri (Mantzavinata) and Argostoli. With the liberation of Lefkada from the Ottoman yoke, members will establish themselves there (Santa Maura, City of Lefkas or Amaxiki, St Peter), as well as at Preveza and Arta. During the 19th century members will settle in mainland Greece (Athens, Andravida, Patras etc.), the Ottoman Empire (Constantinople, Kios, Princes Islands), Romania (Braila), Crimea (Kerch) and Egypt (Suez, Alexandria). In the 20th century they will migrate to Africa (Asmara of Eritrea, Belgian Congo, Burundi, etc.), Jerusalem, Cyprus, the United States, Australia and other places. A comprehensive history, genealogy and heraldry of the Cangelari family was subject of a PhD Thesis by Panayotis D. Cangelaris at the Ionian University (2011).

== Family branches ==
Founder of the family in Cephalonia and head of a long tradition of clergymen in the family is reported Protopapa Georgio Cangelari. In the service of the Most Serene Republic of Venice, members of the family will be appointed during the 16th century military commanders in the region of Erisso and will distinguish themselves in the defense of Cephalonia and in spying activities at the then Ottoman-ruled neighboring regions (Lefkada, Central Greece, Peloponnese). They will also participate and distinguish in military operations of the time (and at sea, as privateers), while during the War of Crete (1645-1669) many will fall in action or will be enslaved. Apart from their military and ecclesiastical duties, members will be elected ambassadors of the Community, or be appointed notaries, elders, superintendents or constables, as well as teachers and medical doctors. By the mid-17th to 18th centuries family branches will be created with the following new surnames: Alissandrato, Vangelato (or Evangelato), Valianato, Velissarato, Galiazzato (or Galiatsato), Giacomato, Giannato, Giorgato, Danato, Diacato, Zamani, Zeppato (or Zepato), Teodosato, Todorato, Livierato, Liosato, Lurando, Marango, Marcato, Matiato, Batistato, Paluchi, Papadimitrato, Papastatato, Pavlato, Prassa, Rissiano, Sara, Stamatato, Stamatelato, Stafieri, Tacugni, Zuganato and Psaro, many of whom are to be found to date on the island and elsewhere. It has to be clarified that the affinity of those who bear surnames with the ending "-ato" can only be proved after a genealogical research, since such surnames may derive from more than one original families. Among the co-fraternal family churches are included two of the most important in the region of Erisso, those of Virgin Mary at Cugiana and of St. Stephen at the village of Vari.

== Members of the family ==
- Georgio Cangelari (d. around 1565), protopapa, founder of the family in Cephalonia
- Stamati Cangelari (d. 1602), protopapa, probably participated in the Naval Battle of Lepanto (1571) as spiritual of the Greek-Orthodox crews of the Allied fleet
- Danea Cangelari (d. around 1572) and his nephew Marco Cangelari (d. around 1570), captains, military commanders of the region of Erisso and ambassadors of the Community of Cephalonia to Venice, distinguished themselves by the successful repulse of the Turkish landing in Erisso (1561)
- Calogianni Cangelari, privateer, was caught slave in 1566
- Franco Cangelari, notary, whose protocol (1564-1602) is the third oldest existing notary book in Cephalonia
- Janni Cangelari (d. before 1623), standard-bearer of the family military company stationed at the small fortress (in Greek: πύργος) facing the village of Plagia in Erisso, which gave its name to the village of Pirgo
- Paolina Cangelari, daughter of captain Marco Cangelari and wife of Costantin Gerachi, grandfather of the same named sailor who later became "favorite" of the King of Siam Narai and was known by the name Constance Phaulkon
- Cesare Cangelari, medical doctor, one of the first known empirical physicians in Erisso (1626)
- Iseppo Cangelari, founder of the Zeppato (or Zepato) family branch, involving five generations of membership in the Council of the Community of Cephalonia, was inscribed in the Golden Book (in Italian: Libro d'Oro) in 1652
- Anzoleto Cangelari (d. 1668), son of Iseppo and his brother-in-law Giorgo Cangelari (d. 1669), were fallen in action at Crete, during the Siege of Candia
- Giorgo Cangelari and his brother Nicolò Cangelari, were captured slaves during the siege of Candia in the war of Crete (the first remained in captivity until at least 1672 and the second by 1673)
- Antonio Cangelari (d. 1697), founder of the family branch that is referred to in the Golden Book of 1799, involving five generations in the Council of the Community of Cephalonia
- Demetrio Cangelari (d. 1753), priest and teacher, founder of the family branch of Papadimitrato and scion of a branch of four generations of clergymen
- Daniele Cangelari, monk, founder and owner of the monastery of Virgin Mary Myrtidiotissa (or Myrtiotissa) in Corfu (mid-18th century)
- Ventura Cangelari, merchant, referred in the Golden Book of 1799, had a considerable commercial activity and presence on the island with seat in St. George Castle
- Gerasimo Cangelari Lurando (1763-1843), creator of a family tradition of four generations of tailors in St. George Castle
- Spiridion Cangelari (d. 1869) and his son Constantine Cangelari (d. 1881), vice-consuls of Great Britain in Asia Minor's city of Kios (today's Gemlik)
- Gianneto Cangelari (1810-1886), one of the first cadets of the Hellenic Military Academy (1828), he retired in 1866 with the rank of major of artillery
- Dionisios Cangelaris (1865-1952), merchant, creator of commercial premises at Ermou street in the Athens city center, with a tradition maintained for three generations
- Chryssanthos Cangelaris (1868-1941), monk and visionary popular fighter with revolutionary temperament, a close associate of Marinos Antypas in Cephalonia
- Panagis Canghelaris (1873-1936), trader and forwarder, settled in Suez, Egypt, where he worked with the company "Bazar Universel et Bureau de Transit et d'Expeditions" and later founded the novelties shop "Bazar du Nil"
- Constantine Cangelaris (1878-1923), barber, composer and conductor of the Livathos Philharmonic School and founder of the Philharmonic of Needy Children at Argostoli
- Valentin Kangelari (1883-1938), nephew of monk Chrysanthos, medical doctor and Bolshevik revolutionary, a hero of the Russian Civil War (1918-1920) was decorated (twice) for gallantry with the Order of the Red Banner, he was military adviser and chief of the general staff of the Mongolian Army (1925-1927), commander of the Military Medical Academy of the Red Army (1930-1937), Soviet deputy minister with rank of a lieutenant general (1936) and MP (1937), fell victim of Stalin's persecutions and was executed
- Viktor Kangelari (1885-1938), brother of Valentin, a microbiologist and chemist, lieutenant of the Volunteer Army of the "Whites" (1919-1920), decided to remain in the Soviet Union, where he worked in Kharkov until he too fell victim of Stalin's persecutions and was executed
- Christos Kangelaris (1885-1976), Army officer, who besides the campaigns, took part in the Macedonian Struggle (1904) alongside Pavlos Melas, as well as the Northern Epirus Struggle (1914), where he excelled
- Gérasime Cangellaris (1889-1956), merchant, participated voluntarily and was injured in the Balkan Wars (1912-1913), worked on the exploitation of large coffee plantations and timber exports from African countries and established premises named "Bazar Universale" in Asmara of Eritrea, where he was elected president of the Hellenic Community there (1919-1935) and honorary consul of Greece until the burning of his shops by the Italian authorities
- Gérasime Cangellaris (1890-1925), francophone poet and editor, as well as amateur painter, published in Alexandria, Egypt, his poetry collection "L'Assemblée Nationale" (1910) and in Paris, France, the "Quand l'Aigle se reveilla ..." (1914), while from 1917 until his untimely death edited the magazine "L'Orient Français". He was awarded the Silver Cross of the Royal Order of the Redeemer
- Elie Cangellaris (1891-1934), lawyer in the Mixed Courts of Alexandria and professor of Law at the "Collège des Écoles des Frères" (1930-1933) and the "Lycée Français - Mission Laique Française" (1930-1933). He was decorated with the French Ordre des Palmes Académiques
- Gerasimos Kangelaris Landos (1892-1945), reserve Army officer and resistance chieftain, militia commander of the Armed Groups of Southern Lefkada (E.O.N.L.) in the South-Western sector of the island of Lefkada, who acted under the forces of E.D.E.S. He was executed by the forces of E.L.A.S.
- Alexandros Kangelaris, Merchant Marine officer, he joined as volunteer the engineers corps of the Greek Army in Asia Minor Campaign and fell in action outside Smyrna during the retreat (1922)
- Catherine Cangellaris (1896-1958), intellectual, writer and amateur actress, active member of charitable associations and founder of the second Greek literary salon in Alexandria, Egypt, named "Kypseli" (in English: Beehive)
- Stavros Cangelaris (b. 1897), Naval officer, conductor of the Hellenic Fleet Band (1928-1930 and 1939-1945) and the Royal Hellenic Navy Band (1936-1939 and 1941-1946) and simultaneously director of the RHN School of Music. During WWII he served on the battleship "Averof" in the Middle East, the Indian Ocean and liberated Greece
- Constantine Marcopoulo Cangelari, poet, published his work with pen names Konstantinos Politis, KAMIKA and T.G.K., accumulating with his collection "Venizelias" (1920)
- Nicholas Cangelaris and his son John Cangelaris, shipowners, owned cargo vessels "Alexandra", "Lord Byron", "Sophia" and "Amyna" for the Danube navigation and were based in Braila, Romania
- Stefanos Cangelaris (1901-1992) and his brother Spiros Cangelaris (1903-1989), sons of Dionisios and heirs of the trade firm founded by him, they were also pioneer amateur football players with F.C. Hope and founding members of F.C. Athinaikos
- Costas Cangelaris (1916-1996), journalist and writer, pioneer climber and skier, took part in the Greco-Italian War 1940-41 with the newly formed Ski Battalion and was awarded the War Cross Second Class. During the occupation he was exiled by Italian occupation forces in Amaliada because of his militant articles (1942). He wrote in a number of newspapers in Patras and Athens, was elected president of the "Union of Journalists of Peloponnesus, Epirus and Islands" (1946-1948) and secretary general of the "Journalists Union of Athens Daily Newspapers" (1983-1991). He was political editor of E.I.R and E.R.T (1964-1982), director of the press office of the Ministry of Education (1956-1961) and press adviser to the governments of the years 1965-1967 until the abolition of the democratic rule. He published the books "War Memories" (1943) and "South Africa - Apartheid, The Stigma" (1986 and 1988)
- Evangelos Cangellaris (1917-1997) and his brother Markos Cangellaris (1920-1984), entrepreneurs, they have created two large stores in the capital of Burundi, Bujumbura, where the latter served as secretary and president of the Greek Community (1964-1976) and honorary consul of Cyprus (1968-1976) there
- Spiridon Cangellaris (1921-1948), student of Law and since 1942 secretary of the Youth of later prime minister George Papandreou, he took part in the battles of the Greek Civil War (1946-1949) as a reservist lieutenant of the Greek Army and fell in action at Grammos (1948)
- Sarandis Kangelaris (1922-1989), made his career with a U.S. Oil Company in Jerusalem, where he had the initiative and was one of the founders (1950) of the Greek Community of the New City, of which he was elected president (1959-1981)
- Demetre Canghelaris (1922-1996), businessman in the field of shipping, international transports and tourism, he voluntarily participated in the Second World War as flying fighter with the 13th Light Bomber Squadron of the RHAF in the Middle East, the Aegean, Italy and the Balkans (1942-1946) and was the first to link by ship ferries the ports of Volos and Tartous, Syria (1977)
- Dionise Cangellaris (1922-2010), entrepreneur in Africa, an active member of the resistance group "Holy Brigade" (in Greek: Ιερά Ταξιαρχία) since 1942, he was seriously injured by the Italian occupation forces during a mission (1943)
- Costas Cangellaris (1924-2002), prefecture official, was appointed registrar in 1946 and thanks to his efforts the Historical Archive of Cephalonia was saved after the devastating earthquake of 1953. During the occupation he developed resistance activity and was imprisoned by the Italians (1943) and the Germans (1944). As a reservist lieutenant of the Greek Army he participated in the battles of the Greek Civil War (1946-1949) and was awarded the War Cross, Third Class. Elected city and county councilor and president of the prefecture committees of the New Democracy and the Political Spring Parties. He was president of the Prefecture General Hospital of Cephalonia (1989-1991). The Municipality of Argostoli gave his name to a street of the city, in the district of "Pharaoh"
- Ersi Cangellaris (1927-2016), violinist, wife of Tatsis Apostolides (1928-2009), eminent violinist, conductor, professor and deputy director of the Conservatory of Athens, founder of the "Greek Quartet" (1952) and "Little String Orchestra" (1979) and author of the book "Fifteen Stories and a bike ride" (2001)

== Bibliography ==
- Manolis Gialourakis "Egypt of the Greeks", Athens 1967 (in Greek)
- Encyclopedia "Eleftheroudakis", vol.7, Athens 1929 (in Greek)
- Stamatoula S. Zapanti "Cephalonia 1500-1571", Thessalonica 1999 (in Greek)
- Katerina F. Zaridi "The Libro d'Oro of Cephalonia of the year 1799", Argostoli 2006 (in Greek)
- Leonidas Ch. Zois "Historical and folklore dictionary of Zante", vol.1, Athens 1963 (in Greek)
- Panayotis D. Cangelaris "The Cangelari Mausoleum at Saint George of the Precipice Monastery in Halki of the Princes Islands", from: Η Κεφαλονίτικη Πρόοδος, period Β', v.13, Athens 2015 (in Greek)
- Panayotis D. Cangelaris "Stavros A. Cangelaris, Conductor of the Fleet and Navy Bands, Director of the H.R.N. School of Music", from: Η Κεφαλονίτικη Πρόοδος, period Β', v.8, Athens 2013 (in Greek)
- Panayotis D. Cangelaris "The French coat of arms of prime counsellor Costantin Gerachi (Constance Phaulkon)", from: Η Κεφαλονίτικη Πρόοδος, period Β', v.7, Athens 2013 (in Greek)
- Panayotis D. Cangelaris "Valentin A. Kangelari (1883-1938) - A Soviet hero with Cephalonian roots", from: Η Κεφαλονίτικη Πρόοδος, period Β', v.6, Athens 2013 (in Greek)
- Panayotis D. Cangelaris "Costantin Gerachi (Constance Phaulkon) - A new genealogical approach", from: Η Κεφαλονίτικη Πρόοδος, period Β, v.3, Athens 2012 (in Greek)
- Panayotis D. Cangelaris "Captains Danea and Marco Cangelari and their Contribution to the Defense of Cephalonia (16th Century)", from: Περί Ιστορίας, Ι.Ε.Ι.Μ., v.5, Corfu 2007 (in Greek)
- Panayotis D. Cangelaris "Two Unknown Cephalonian Intellectuals in Egypt - Gerasime and Kate D. Cangellaris", from: Η Κεφαλονίτικη Πρόοδος, year 5, v.53-54, Athens 1976 (in Greek)
- P.D.Cangelaris "History and Genealogy of the Cangelari Family of Cephalonia (16th-20th Centuries)", Corfu 2011 (in Greek) ISBN 978-960-85532-2-4
- P.D.Cangelaris "The Migrations of the Cangelari Family of Cephalonia (17th century to our days)", from: Δελτίο Ε.Γ.Ε.Ε., v.8, Athens 1991 (in Greek)
- P.D.Cangelaris "Angelique Panayotatou - Kate Cangellaris, Two Cephalonian Ladies in Alexandria and their Literary Salons", from: Πρακτικά Ε' Διεθνούς Πανιονίου Συνεδρίου, Ε.Κ.Ι.Ε., v.4, Argostoli 1991 (in Greek)
- Charilaos V. Collas "The island of Corfu in 16th century as revealed from the Corfiot historical archives", Corfu 1994 (in Greek)
- Apostolos G. Constantinides (Pilios Zagras) "Intellectual Greek women in Egypt (1861-1966)", Athens 1966 (in Greek)
- Apostolos G. Constantinides (Pilios Zagras) "The literary salons of Greek women in Egypt", Athens 1966 (in Greek)
- Takis Kalogeropoulos "Dictionary of Greek music, from Orpheus till today", v.1 and 2, Athens 2002 (in Greek)
- Andreas Kastanis "The Hellenic Military Academy and the First Years of its Function 1828-1834" (PhD Thesis), Ioannina 1995 (in Greek)
- Linda Leoussi "The history of Greek music 2000 B.C. - 2000 A.D.", Athens 2003 (in Greek)
- Lexikon "Great Military and Naval Encyclopedia", Athens 1929 (in Greek)
- Maria J. Marcopoulos "Cephalonians and Ithacians in the navigation of the Danube", Athens 1967 (in Greek)
- Fani Mavroidi "Contribution to the history of the Greek Brotherhood of Venice in 16th century - Publication of the 2nd Register of entries (1522-1562)", Athens 1976 (in Greek)
- Akylas Millas "The Princess island cadastre", Athens 2006 (in Greek)
- Akylas Millas "Retrospective on the Princess islands", Athens 2001 (in Greek)
- Akylas Millas "The Princess island", Athens 1988 (in Greek)
- Akylas Millas "Chalki of the Princess islands", Athens 1984 (in Greek)
- Geras. E. Pentogalos "The church of St. John Chryssostome at Vari in Erisso", from: Η Κεφαλονίτικη Πρόοδος, v.67-68, Athens 1977 (in Greek)
- Petros Petratos "The course and action of monk Chryssanthos Cangelaris and deacon Ioannis Conidaris, coworkers and followers of M. Antypas", from: Πρακτικά επιστημονικού συνεδρίου Μαρίνος Αντύπας (1872-1907) Δήμου Πυλαρέων, Aghia Efimia 2009 (in Greek)
- Anastasia Siphoniou-Karapa, Menelaos A. Tourtoglou, Spyridon N. Tro:ianos "The notary archives of Cephalonia", Επετηρίς Κ.Ε.Ι.Ε.Δ. Ακαδημίας Αθηνών, v.16-17, Athens 1972 (in Greek)
- C. N. Sathas "Documents inédits relatifs à l'histoire de la Grèce au Moyen Age", v.5 and 9, Paris 1883 and 1890 (in French)
- Elias A. Tsitselis "Cephalonian Miscellaneous - Contribution to the history and folklore of the island of Cephalonia", v.1 and 2, Athens 1904 and 1960 (in Greek)
- Spyridon G. Phocas "The Greeks in the navigation of the Lower Danube", Thessalonica 1975 (in Greek)
