= Strait of Ithaca =

Strait in Greece

Coordinates: 38.38°N 20.64°E

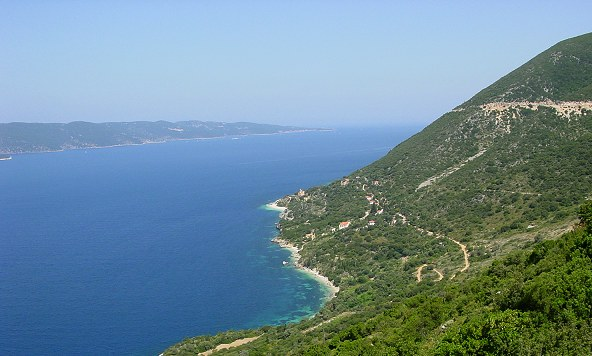
Strait of Ithaca

The Strait of Ithaca (Greek: Στενό Ιθάκης, Steno Ithakis) is a strait separating the islands of Kefalonia to the west and Ithaca to the east. The Strait is approximately 20 km long and 4 to 6 km wide. It runs from south to north, starting at Cape Dichalia and Cape Agios Andreas (northeast of Sami and the Agia Effimia Bay) and ending at Cape Viotis and Cape Exogi (north of Fiskardo). The boating route linking the ports of Sami and Fiskardo lies in this strait. The Strait connects to the Ionian Sea on both sides. The Agia Effimia and Sami bays lie to the southwest.

== Places by the strait ==
- West:
  - Fiskardo
- East:
  - Aetos
  - Agios Ioannis
  - Stavros
  - Lefki

== Islands in the Strait of Ithaca ==
- Asteris (a.k.a. Daskalio) - only island in the strait.
