= Makryotika =

Makryotika Μακρυώτικα
- Community
- Location within Greece
- Coordinates: 38°18′30″N 20°33′25″E
- Country: Greece
- Administrative region: Ionian Islands
- Regional unit: Cephalonia
- Municipality: Sami
- Municipal unit: Pylaros

Population (2021)
  - Community: 402
- Time zone: UTC+2 (EET)
  - Summer (DST): UTC+3 (EEST)

Makryotika (Greek: Μακρυώτικα) is a village located on the slopes of Mount Agia Dynati, on the Ionian island of Kefalonia in Greece. It contains the neighbourhood known as Potamianata. It is one of three local communities within the greater municipal unit of Pylaros and had a population of 402 in 2021.

The village's main square has a fountain and panoramic views over the whole of the Pylaros valley.

Makryotika has a school, a tavern, and a supermarket with a butcher shop. The butcher raises his own livestock organically on his farm in the mountains. There is also a small ironworks and a carpenter's shop. One of the local bakeries still makes its bread in the traditional way.

Within the community area of Makriotika there are two petrol stations, supermarkets, another ironworks, a cafe, more bakeries, cheesemakers, and auto mechanics. During the summer months, there are many apartments, studios and rooms to let. A regular bus service operates between Makriotika and Agia Efimia.

== Gardens ==
The villagers of Makryotika always have an abundance of colour in their gardens as well as in pots and other containers on their patios. Many gardens boast lemon trees, mandarine trees and vines, as well as honeysuckle and jasmine. Wild sage and lavender are abundant on the sides of the narrow roads and within the gardens or walls of some of the traditional, old houses ruined by the 1953 Ionian earthquake.

A memorial garden a few yards down the road from the square was recently completed in remembrance of local war heroes.
