= Cephalonia Prefecture =

Coordinates: 38°15′N 20°30′E

Cephalonia Prefecture Nomós Kefallenías (Νομός Κεφαλληνίας)
- Former prefecture
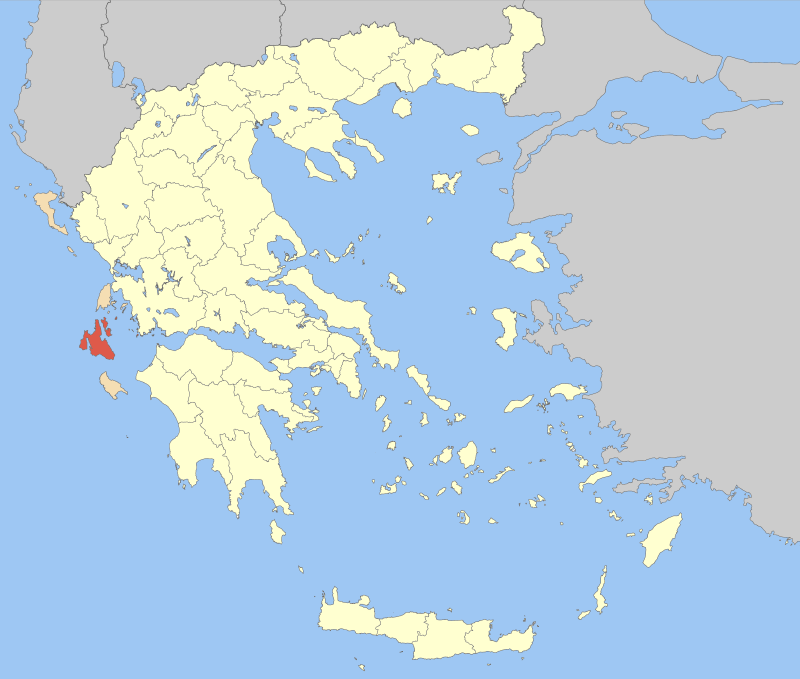
- Location of Cephalonia Prefecture in Greece

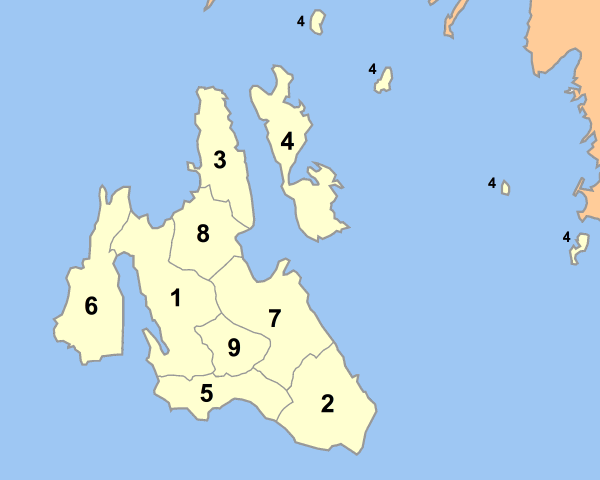
- Location of municipalities within Cephalonia Prefecture Prefecture
- Country: Greece
- Periphery: Ionian Islands
- Capital: Argostoli
- Subdivisions: List: 3 provinces; 8 municipalities; 1 community

Area
  - Total: 904 km^{2} (349 sq mi)
  - Rank: 49th

Population (2005)
  - Total: 42,088
  - Rank: 50th
  - Density: 46.6/km^{2} (121/sq mi)
  - Rank: 33rd
- Postal codes: 28x xx
- Area codes: 267x0
- ISO 3166 code: GR-23
- Vehicle registration: ΚΕ
- Website: www.kefalonia.eu

The Cephalonia Prefecture (Greek: Νομός Κεφαλληνίας) was a prefecture in Greece, containing the Ionian Islands of Cephalonia and Ithaca. In 2011 the prefectural self-government was abolished and the territory is now covered by the regional units of Cephalonia and Ithaca.

== Provinces ==
It was previously divided into 3 eparchies (provinces), and one independent municipality, Ithaca:

- Krani Province - Argostoli
- Paliki Province - Lixouri
- Sami Province - Sami

== Municipalities ==
The prefecture was divided into eight municipalities and one community:

- Argostoli
- Eleios-Pronnoi
- Erisos
- Ithaca
- Leivathos
- Paliki
- Pylaros
- Sami
- Omala (Community)

All of the preceding are on the Cephalonia island, except Ithaca, which is on its own island of the same name.

== See also ==
- Cephalonia (constituency)
