= Vasilikiades =

Vasilikiades Βασιλικιάδες
- Community
- Vasilikiades in 2007

- Location within Greece
- Coordinates: 38°24′43″N 20°33′43″E
- Country: Greece
- Administrative region: Ionian Islands
- Regional unit: Cephalonia
- Municipality: Sami
- Municipal unit: Erisos

Population (2021)
  - Community: 138
- Time zone: UTC+2 (EET)
  - Summer (DST): UTC+3 (EEST)

Vasilikiades (Greek: Βασιλικιάδες) is a village in the Erisos region in north Kefalonia, a western Greek island. The village of Fiscardo is to the north 8 km away and to the south Asos is 10 km with Myrtos Beach a few more km south. Vasilikiades is sometimes called Enosi locally which means 'union' in Greek and refers to the union of villages when one new village was built after the destruction of some smaller ones in the 1953 Ionian earthquake. Views from certain vantage points in this area are across the island's forested west coast and across the sea to the island of Lefkas. It is a well known vantage point for stunning sunsets. Vasilikiades is a pretty traditional village with strict preservation orders so that new building follows the traditional style.
