= Karavomylos =

Karavomylos Καραβόμυλος
- Community
- Location within Greece
- Coordinates: 38°15′20″N 20°37′40″E
- Country: Greece
- Administrative region: Ionian Islands
- Regional unit: Cephalonia
- Municipality: Sami
- Municipal unit: Sami

Population (2021)
  - Community: 391
- Time zone: UTC+2 (EET)
  - Summer (DST): UTC+3 (EEST)

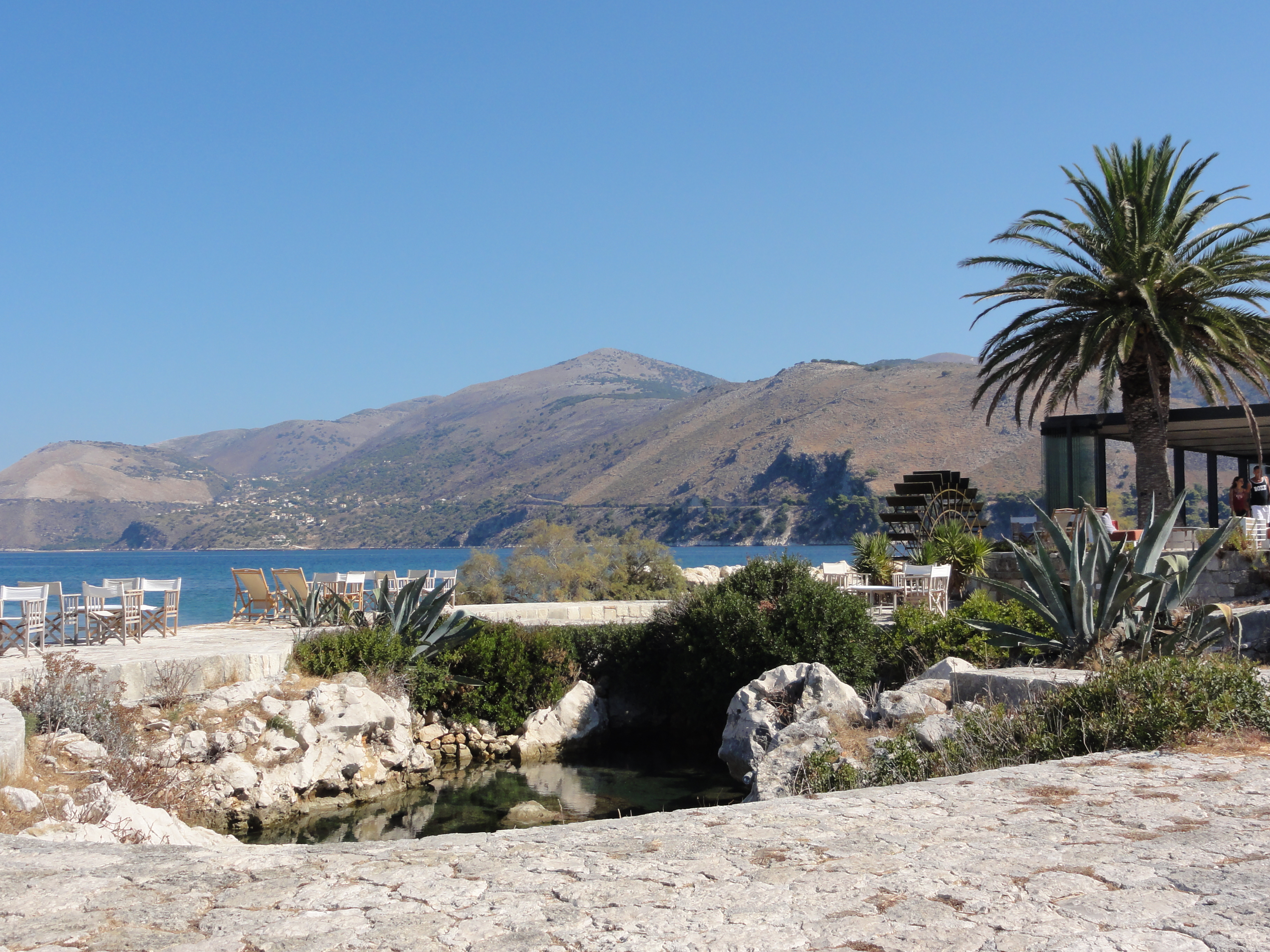
Kefalonia, Karavomylos

Karavomylos (Greek: Καραβόμυλος) is a fishing village and a community in the municipal unit of Sami, on the island of Cephalonia, Greece. It is situated on the coast, 2km west of Sami, 6km southeast of Agia Effimia and 15km northeast of Argostoli.

Near the village are two notable landmarks, the Drogarati cave and the Melissani cave, which are a tourist attractions on the island.

== Population ==
Historical population
Year	Pop.	±%
1981	260	—
1991	305	+17.3%
2001	340	+11.5%
2011	385	+13.2%
2021	391	+1.6%

== See also ==
- List of settlements in Cephalonia
