= Greek protests =

Greek protests may refer to:

- Kileler uprising, 1910 mass farmer protests against extended privileges of landowners and the limitation of their own rights in Kileler
- Anti-austerity movement in Greece, 2010–2012 series of demonstrations and general strikes sparked by plans to cut public spending and raise taxes
- Athens Polytechnic uprising, 1973 massive demonstration of popular rejection of the Greek military junta of 1967–1974
- 2008 Greek riots, large protests and demonstrations that escalated to widespread rioting, starting in Athens and spreading to other cities.
- 2021 Greek protests, demonstrations against a proposed government bill that would allow police presence on university campuses, without the approval of the university's council or as a response to a felony, for the first time in decades.
- 2023 Tempi train crash protests, public reactions to conditions that led to head-on train collision and numerous deaths
