= Myrtos Beach =

Beach in Greece

Coordinates: 38.3429°N 20.5362°E

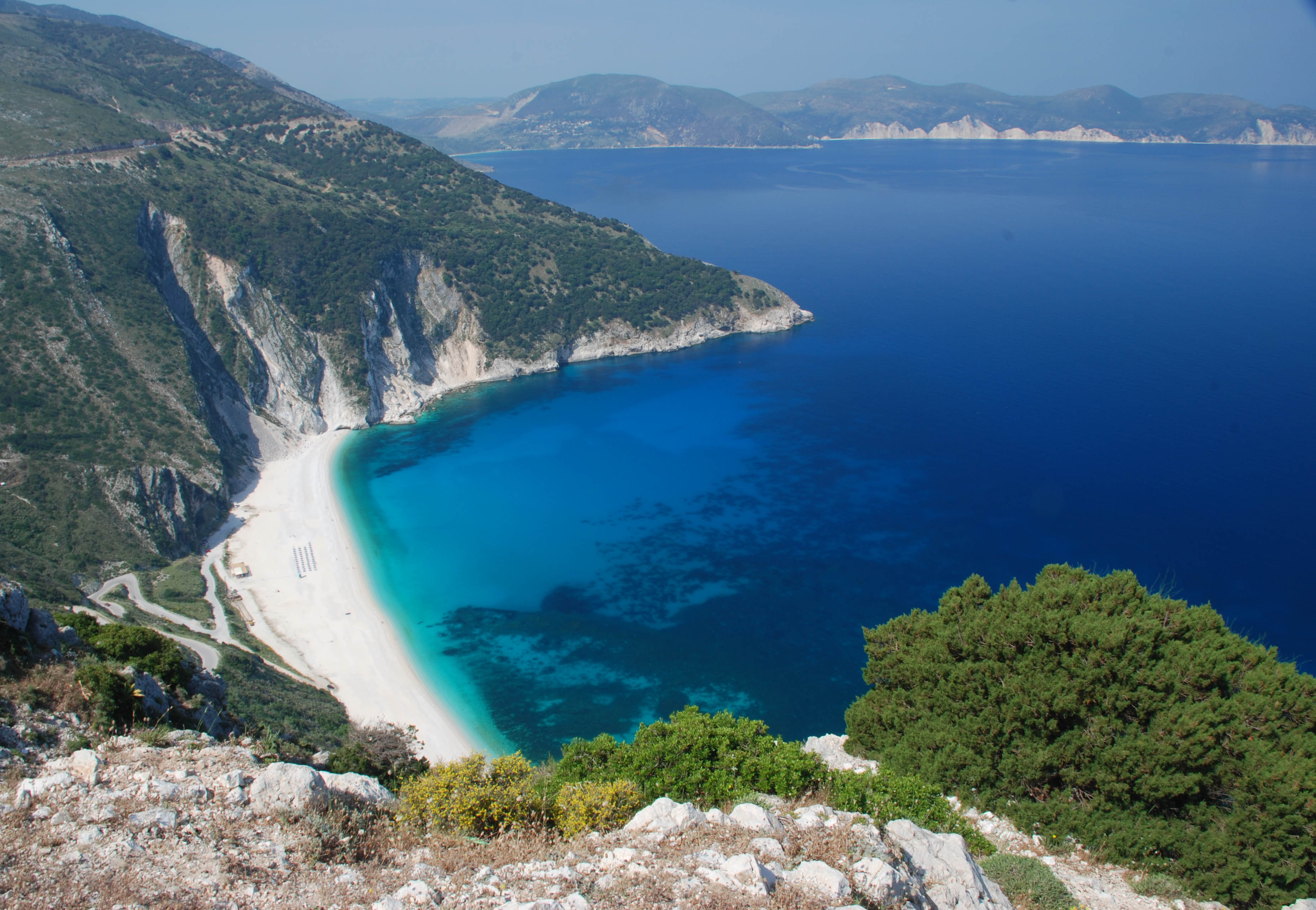
Myrtos Beach seen from the coast road

Location of Myrtos Beach in the Ionian Islands of Greece

Myrtos Beach (Greek: Παραλία Μύρτου [Míːrtɒs]) is in the region of Pylaros, in the north-west of Kefalonia island, in the Ionian Sea of Greece. Myrtos beach lies between the feet of two mountains, Agia Dynati and Kalon Oros (901m).

== Geology ==
The surrounding sediment at Myrtos Beach is generally made up of marble material, a metamorphosed limestone. The beach is made up of round, white cobblestones. The sediment gradually becomes smaller as you approach the shoreline. Because the slope angle has an abrupt drop near the edge of the shoreline, the wave energy is very high and causes the gradation trends from cobbles to pebbles along the beach.

Longshore drift, along with wave energy, has shaped the shore. As waves curve along the beach they also pick up the finest bits of marble; this creates sediment plumes that follow the curve of the beach with the direction of the waves giving the water a shade of turquoise.

== Fame ==
Myrtos has been described as "one of the most dramatic beaches in Greece", with its "mile-and-a-half long arc of dazzling white pebbles."

It was used as the location for the mine explosion episode in the film Captain Corelli's Mandolin.

Myrtos has been voted 12 times the best Greek beach while it regularly features in best beaches lists.

== Travel and Amenities ==
A steep, winding road, about 2 km in length and with hairpin turns, leads down to the beach from the village of Divarata.

During the high tourist-season in the summer, the Municipality of Pylaros runs a public bus service to and from Myrtos Beach, departing from the harbour area in Agia Efimia. Timetables can be found at the Tourist Information office in Agia Efimia and may also be listed online. The bus stops on the road leading down to the beach, with a brief walk down. Private-car parking is available at the base of the cliffs. There are several tavernas at the top of the road leading down to the beach in the village of Divarata.

== Photo gallery ==
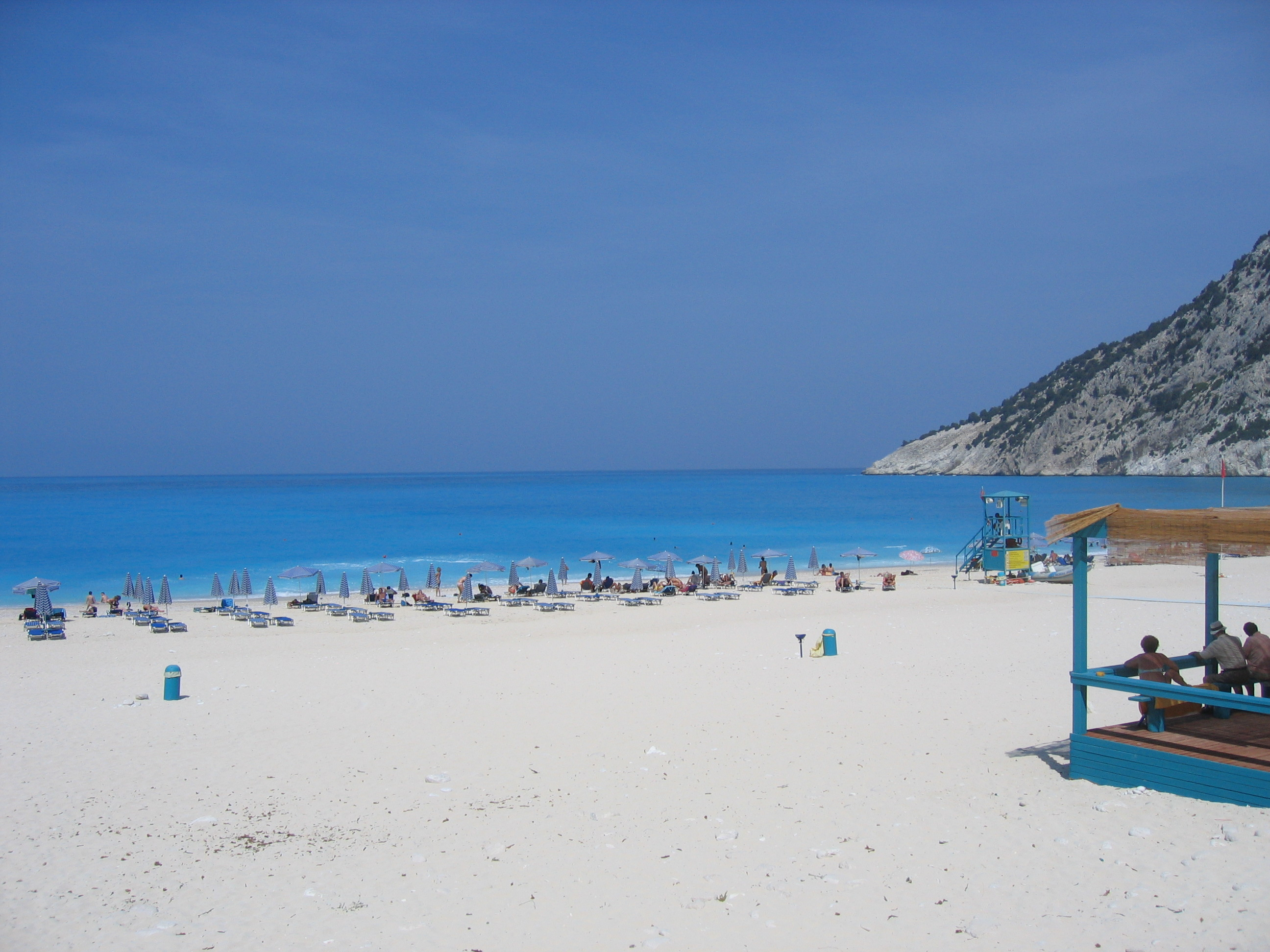
Taverna near the beach

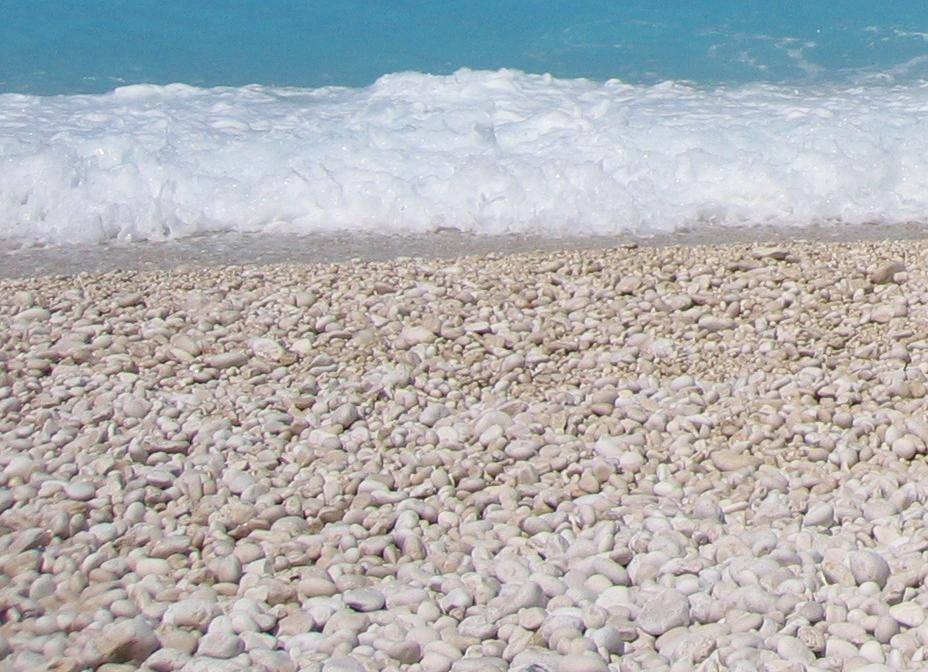
Myrtos beach white pebbles
