= Archaeological Museum of Argostoli =

Museum in Argostoli, Kefalonia, Greece

Coordinates: 38°10′40″N 20°29′17″E

The Archaeological Museum of Argostoli, also known as the Kefalonia Museum, is a museum in Argostoli, Greece, located a few blocks south of the central square, across the Municipal Theater on R. Vergoti Street.

The old museum was destroyed by an earthquake in 1953. The next building was built in 1960 and designed by the well-known architect Patroklos Karantinos. The museum also featured many other items of pottery and jewelry from excavations around the island and Melissani Lake. It also contains some 3rd-century BC tombstones, a 2nd-century BC mosaic from the temple of Poseidon and archived photographs of an 1899 excavation at Sami.

The building was damaged in the eartchquake of 2014 and was demolished a few years later. The construction of a new building started.
