= William Lee Bergstrom =

American gambler

- Born: William Lee Bergstrom; 1951; Austin, Texas, U.S.
- Died: February 4, 1985 (aged 33); Las Vegas, Nevada, U.S.
- Cause of death: Suicide by drug overdose
- Occupations: Real estate agent Gambler
- Years active: 1980 –1984

William Lee Bergstrom (1951 – February 4, 1985), commonly known as The Suitcase Man or Phantom Gambler, was a gambler and high roller known for placing the largest bet in casino gambling history at the time, amounting to $777,000 ($3.04 million present-day amount) at the Horseshoe Casino, which he won. Bergstrom returned to the Horseshoe three years later in 1984 and placed several additional bets, including a $1 million bet ($3.1 million present-day value) which he lost.

== Early life ==
Bergstrom was born in Austin, Texas, and attended Austin High School, graduating in 1969. Majoring in electrical engineering, he enrolled at Texas Tech University in Lubbock, Texas, in fall 1969. Bergstrom, who enjoyed aviation, became a private pilot, and worked as a waiter at a local restaurant in Lubbock, often working till late at night prior to returning to his dorm room at Weymouth Hall on the Texas Tech campus. In Spring of 1971, Bergstrom departed Texas Tech and attended the University of Texas, but he dropped out in 1974. His brother Alan Bergstrom described their childhood as marred. Their parents were divorced, and Bill constantly desired the respect and affection of his father.

After dropping out, Bergstrom made a living selling real estate and owning property in Texas.

== Gambling ==
On September 24, 1980, Bergstrom arrived at Binion's Horseshoe Casino in Las Vegas with two suitcases: one containing $777,000 in cash, the other empty. Benny Binion had a policy of honoring a bet of any size if it was the player's first bet at the casino. Bergstrom, who remained anonymous at the time, placed the full amount on the Don't Pass line in craps. The shooter established a point of six, then made a seven two rolls later, resulting in a $777,000 win for Bergstrom. Binion helped Bergstrom stack his winnings into the empty suitcase. According to Ted Binion, Bergstrom had borrowed most of the money for the bet and intended to commit suicide if he lost. Instead, he won and traveled the world for several years before returning on March 24, 1984.

On his second visit, Bergstrom placed a $538,000 bet, again on a single roll of dice. He won again, took his mother to a Willie Nelson show, and won an additional $117,000 on three more craps bets.

Then on November 16, he returned and placed a $1,000,000 bet with a suitcase filled with $550,000 in cash, $140,000 in gold Krugerrands, and $310,000 in cashier's checks. Again, Bergstrom bet the Don't Pass. This time, the shooter threw a seven on the come-out roll, resulting in a loss for Bergstrom.

== Death ==
Bergstrom never recovered from his million-dollar loss and committed suicide on February 4, 1985, by swallowing pills. Despite this, the reason for his suicide remains unknown. Friends and family believed that he was not broke at the time of his death and still had $647,000.

His note suggested his suicide was triggered by a breakup with a man 10 years his junior.

== Legacy ==
Bergstrom's story remains in Las Vegas lore and has inspired awards and prize giveaways throughout Las Vegas.

== See also ==
- Archie Karas
- Nick the Greek
- List of bets
