= Agia Dynati =

Mountain in Greece

- Αγία Δυνατή
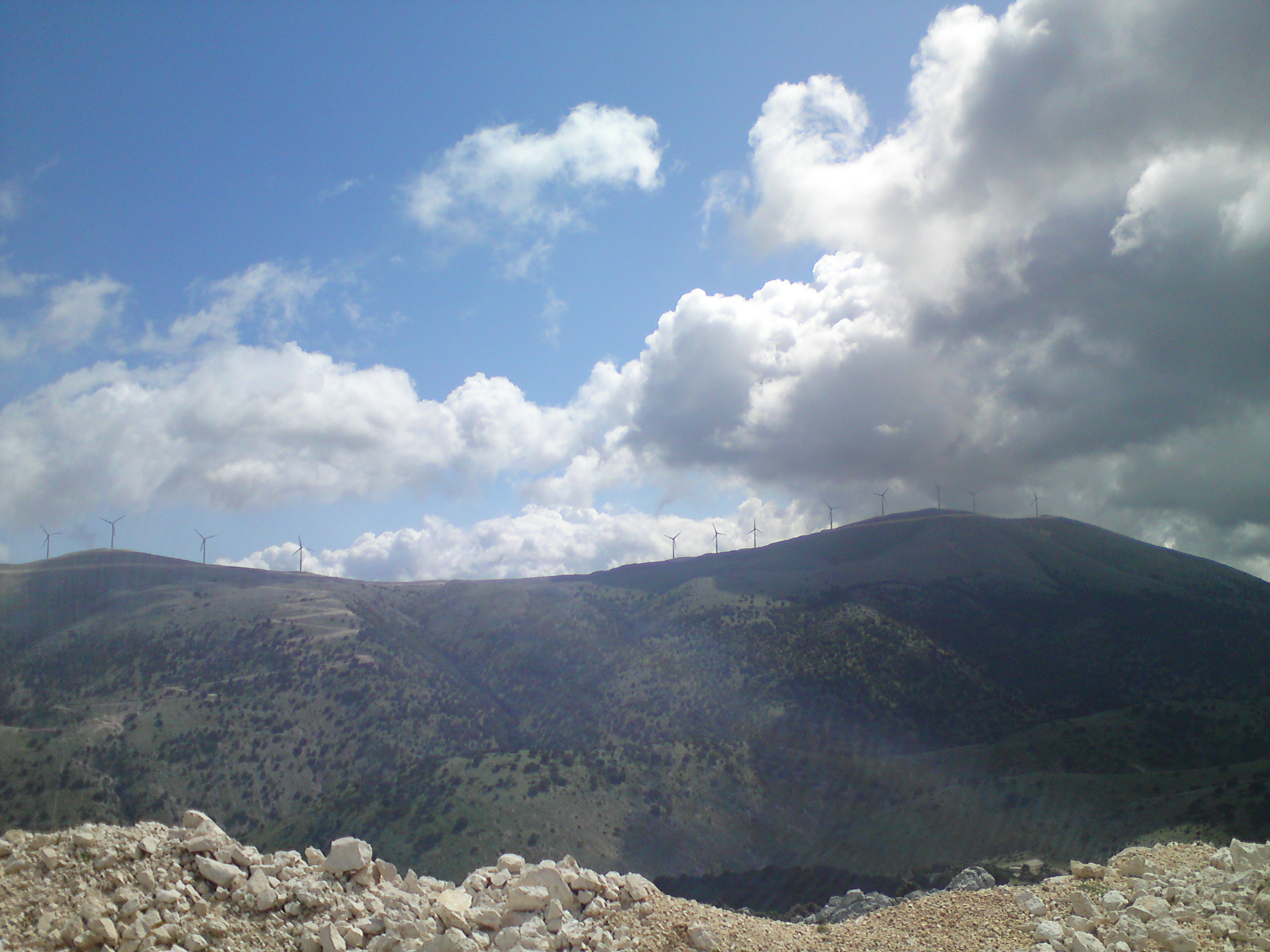
- Agia Dynati

Highest point
- Elevation: 1,131 m (3,711 ft)
- Listing: List of mountains in Greece
- Coordinates: 38°15′57″N 20°32′53″E

Naming
- Pronunciation: Greek: [adiˈxasia]

Geography
- Location within Greece
- Location: Cefalonia, Greece

Agia Dynati (Greek: Αγία Δυνατή, English: Saint Dynati) is the second highest Greek mountain of Cefalonia (1131 m.), after Mount Ainos (Mavrovouno). It is also the third highest mountain of the Ionian Islands, after Ainos and Elati (Lefkada). Between the mountain's peaks are small tablelands, with a larger one named Falari. It is believed that Falari produces the best feta cheese in Greece.

The stretch of the mountain includes parts of the municipalities of Lixouri, Pylaros, Sami, and Kranaia. At Agia Dynati, during the 16th century, the Holy Monastery of Panagia Thematon was built. Many traditional villages, such as Makriotika, Divarata, Poulata, are built in the mountains.

In mythology, Agia Dynati is believed to be the rock that Cronus threw to Earth, after Zeus gained power. Rhea, the wife of Cronus, gave him the rock, covered with swaddling clothes, to eat, because Cronus had eaten all of her children. When Cronus swallowed the rock, he suffered. So, Rhea could birth his child Zeus in Crete without Cronus knowing it. When Zeus gained power, he commanded Cronus to throw the rock, and the children he had eaten, to the Earth. The origin of the name "Agia Dynati" is unknown, as there is no Saint Dynati on the Orthodox calendar.

In Agia Dynati, members of the 33 Infantry Division Acqui were killed by Germans during the infamous "Massacre of the Acqui Division."
