= Archie Karas =

Greek-American poker player (1950–2024)

- Born: Anargyros Nicholas Karabourniotis; November 1, 1950; Antypata, Cephalonia, Greece
- Died: September 7, 2024 (aged 73); Los Angeles County, California, U.S.
- Other name: The Greek
- Games: Gin Rummy; Poker; Canasta; Craps; Baccarat; Blackjack; Pool (parlor)
- World Series of Poker
- Money finishes: 7

Anargyros Nicholas Karabourniotis (Greek: Ανάργυρος Καραβουρνιώτης; November 1, 1950 – September 7, 2024), commonly known as Archie Karas, was a Greek-American gambler, high roller, poker player, and pool shark famous for the largest and longest documented winning streak in casino gambling history, simply known as The Run, when he drove to Las Vegas with $50 in December 1992 and then turned a $10,000 loan into more than $40 million by the beginning of 1995, only to lose it all later that year. Karas himself claimed to have gambled with more money in casinos than anyone else in history and has often been compared to Nick the Greek, another high-stakes gambler of Greek origin.

== Early life ==
Karas was born on November 1, 1950, in Antypata on the island of Cephalonia, Kingdom of Greece. He grew up in poverty and had to shoot marbles as a teenager to avoid going hungry. His father, Nickolas, was a construction worker who struggled financially.

Karas ran away from home at the age of 15 after his father, in a rage, threw a shovel at him, barely missing his head. He never saw his father again. Nickolas died four years later.

Karas worked as a waiter on a ship, making $60 a month until the ship arrived at Portland, Oregon.

== Gambling career ==
He later moved to Los Angeles and worked in a restaurant that was next to a pool hall. He honed his pool skills and eventually made more money playing pool than he did as a waiter. When his victims from the pool hall thinned out, he switched to playing poker in Los Angeles card rooms. Karas claims to have gone from being broke to a millionaire and back several times. Later, he became an astute poker player, building his bankroll to over $2,000,000. Professional poker players such as Chip Reese and Doyle Brunson, had played and considered Karas a weaker poker player, often giving Karas handicaps to play. In December 1992, Karas had lost all but $50 playing high-stakes poker. Instead of reevaluating his situation and slowing down, he decided to go to Las Vegas in search of bigger games. The next three years would go down in legend as the greatest run in casino gambling history.

You've got to understand something. Money means nothing to me. I don't value it. I've had all the material things I could ever want. Everything. The things I want, money can't buy: health, freedom, love, happiness. I don't care about money, so I have no fear. I don't care if I lose it.

=== The Run ===
In December 1992, after losing his entire bankroll, Karas drove to Vegas with his car and $50 in his wallet. After arriving at The Mirage, Karas recognized a fellow poker player from Los Angeles and convinced him to lend him $10,000. Karas quickly turned the loan into $30,000 playing $200/$400 limit Razz. Karas paid $20,000 to his backer, who was more than content.

With a little over $10,000 in his pocket, Karas went to a bar with a pool table adjacent to the Liberace Plaza on East Tropicana. There he found a wealthy and respected poker and pool player. Karas refused to reveal his name for the sake of his opponent's reputation; he simply referred to him as "Mr. X". They started playing 9-ball pool at $5,000 a game, raising the stakes as time went on. After Karas had won several hundred thousand dollars, they raised the stakes to $40,000 a game. Many gamblers and professional poker players watched Karas play at stakes never seen before. Karas ended up winning $1,200,000. The two decided to play poker at Binion's Horseshoe, where Karas won an additional $3,000,000 from Mr. X. Karas was willing to gamble everything he had won and continued to raise the stakes to a level few dared to play at.

With a bankroll of $4 million, Karas gambled his bankroll up to $7 million after spending only three months in Las Vegas. By now, many poker players had heard of Mr. X's losses to Karas. Only the best players dared to challenge him. Karas sat at the Binion's Horseshoe's poker table with 5 of his 7 million dollars in front of him, waiting for any players willing to play for such stakes.

The first challenger was Stu Ungar, a three-time World Series of Poker champion widely regarded as one of the greatest Texas hold'em and gin rummy players of all time. Ungar was backed by Lyle Berman, another professional poker player and business executive who had co-founded Grand Casinos. Karas first beat Ungar for $500,000 playing heads-up Razz. Karas then played Ungar in 7-card stud, which cost Ungar an additional $700,000. The next player was Chip Reese, widely regarded as the greatest cash game player. Reese claims that Karas beat him for more money than anyone else he ever played. After 25 games, Reese was down $2,022,000 playing $8,000/$16,000 limit.

Karas continued to beat many top players, from Puggy Pearson to Johnny Moss. Many of the best players would not play him simply because his stakes were too high. The only player to beat Karas in the first round during his run was Johnny Chan, who beat him for $900,000, though Chan lost to Karas frequently, before and after the streak. By the end of his six-month-long winning streak, Karas had amassed more than $17 million. Karas said that Doyle Brunson was the only player able to beat him at Razz during his winning streak.

The poker action for Karas mostly dried up due to his reputation and stakes. He turned to craps for $100,000 per roll. Karas was allowed to make pass line and come bets of up to $300,000, but with no odds. Jack Binion capped Karas' buy bets on the 4 and 10 at $100,000. At one point, Binion raised Karas' 4 and 10 buy bet limit to $200,000. Karas quickly won $920,000 under these conditions; then Binion immediately lowered the limit back to $100,000. Karas said that he could quickly win $3 million on dice, while it would take days to weeks with poker. Karas stated, "with each play I was making million-dollar decisions, I would have played even higher if they'd let me."

Transporting money became a hassle for Karas, as he had several million dollars in his car every day. He carried a gun with him at all times and would often have his brother and casino security guards escort him. At one point, Karas won all of the Binion's casino's $5000 chips, the highest denomination at the time. By the end of his winning streak, he had won over $40 million.

== Downfall ==
Karas's odds-defying two-and-a-half-year streak came to an end in 1995 when he lost most of his money in a period of three weeks. He lost $11 million playing craps and then lost the $2 million he won from Chip Reese back to him. Following these losses, he switched to baccarat and lost another $17 million, for a total of $30 million. With approximately $12 million left and needing a break from gambling, he returned to Greece. When he came back to Las Vegas, he went back to the Horseshoe, shooting craps and playing baccarat at $300,000 per bet, and in less than a month, lost all but his last million.

With his last million, he went to the Bicycle Club and played Johnny Chan in a $1,000,000 freezeout match. This time, Chan was backed by Lyle Berman, and they took turns playing Karas. He preferred playing both of them, instead of just Chan, as he felt Chan was the tougher opponent. Karas won and doubled his money, only to lose it all at dice and baccarat, betting at the highest limits, in just a few days.

== Mini-streaks ==
After he lost his $40 million, he went on a few smaller streaks. Less than a year later, he turned $40,000 into $1,000,000 at the Desert Inn. He then went back to the Horseshoe and won an additional $4 million before losing it all the next day.

A few years later, Karas went on another streak at the Gold Strike Casino, 32 miles from Las Vegas. He went with $1,800 and lost $1,600 until he was down to just $200. Then after getting something to eat, he decided to gamble the rest of it. He shot dice and ran his $200 into $9,700 and then headed to Las Vegas. He stopped at Fitzgeralds Casino & Hotel and won another $36,000, betting $1,000 with $2,000 odds. He went back to Binion's and won another $300,000 at the Horseshoe and by the third day, had won a total of $980,000 from a low of $200.

== Personal life ==
Karas resided in Las Vegas. His family lives in Greece. Karas stayed in touch with his family by phone, and tried to travel back to Greece at least once per year. He brought his mother, Mariana, to Las Vegas for six-month visits when he was on his winning streak.

Karas's story was documented in Cigar Aficionado by American author Michael Konik and also was featured, along with Stu Ungar, in an E! documentary special called THS Investigates: Vegas Winners & Losers. Konik also wrote an article about Karas which was featured in a book about Las Vegas gamblers called The Man With the $100,000 Breasts.

He was interviewed, along with poker player Tony G, by Tiffany Michelle during the 2008 World Series of Poker. He was also a featured player on ESPN's coverage of the 2008 WSOP.

=== Cheating ===
Karas was arrested on September 24, 2013, after being caught marking cards at a San Diego casino's blackjack table by the Barona Gaming Commission. He was arrested at his Las Vegas home and extradited to San Diego to face charges of burglary, winning by fraudulent means and cheating. He was found guilty and sentenced to three years probation. Subsequently, he was permanently banned from all Nevada casinos in 2015.

=== Death ===
Karas died on September 7, 2024, at the age of 73.

== See also ==
- William Lee Bergstrom
- Nick Dandolos
