= Divarata =

Divarata Διβαράτα
- Community
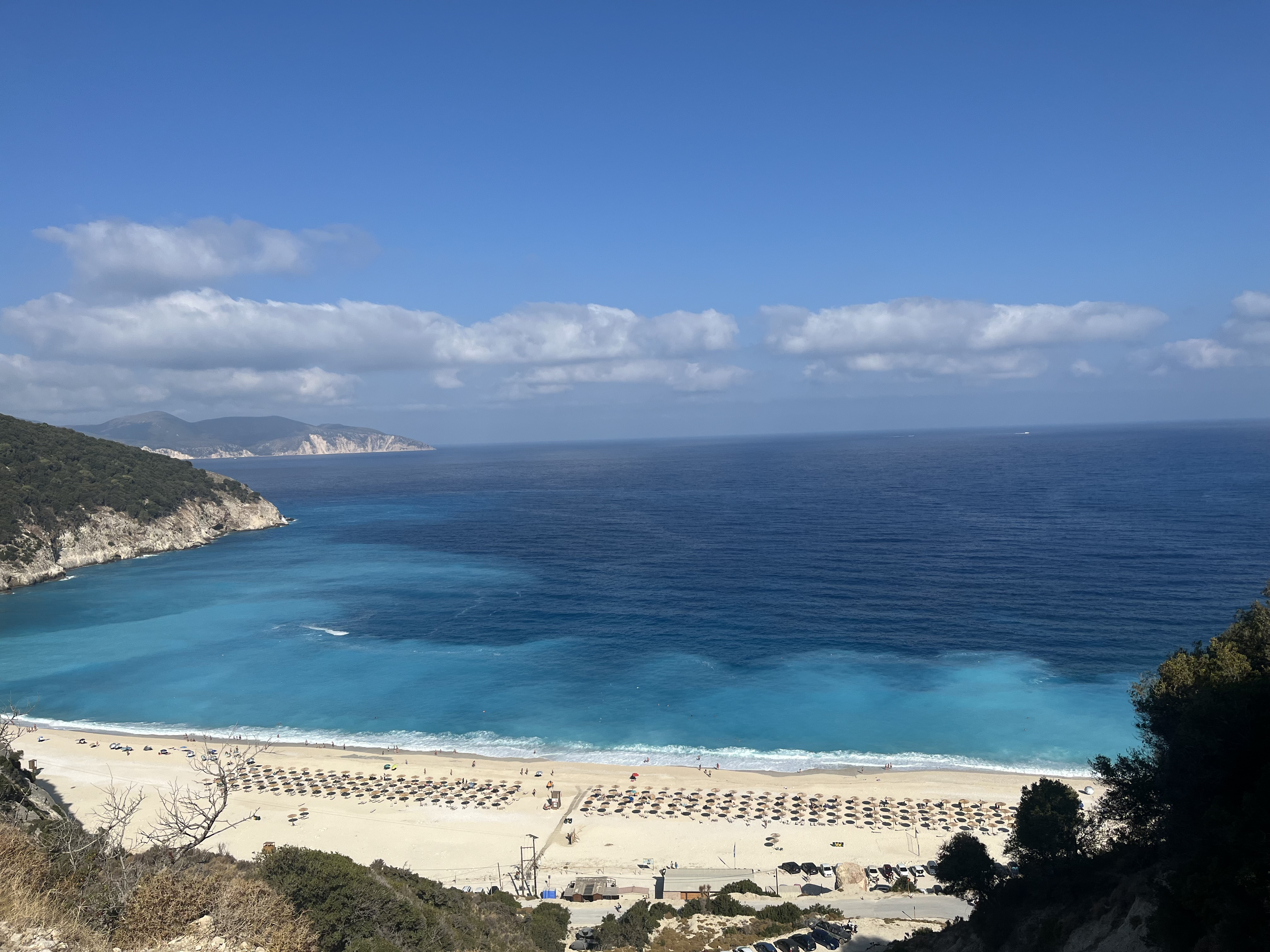
- View of the local Myrtos Beach, from Divarata

- Location within Greece
- Coordinates: 38°20′N 20°33′E
- Country: Greece
- Administrative region: Ionian Islands
- Regional unit: Kefalonia
- Municipality: Sami
- Municipal unit: Pylaros
- Elevation: 225 m (738 ft)

Population (2021)
  - Community: 382
- Time zone: UTC+2 (EET)
  - Summer (DST): UTC+3 (EEST)
- Postal code: 280 81
- Area code: +30 26740
- Vehicle registration: ΚΕ
- Website: Pylaros

Divarata is a village and a community in the municipal unit of Pylaros, in the northern part of the Cephalonia island, in Greece. It is 5 km northwest of Agia Effimia, 5 km south of Asos, and 18 km northeast of Argostoli. The road down to the famous Myrtos Beach originates at the village. The community consists of the villages Divarata, Antypata, and Loukata.

== Famous residents ==
- Archie Karas
