= Fiskardo =

Fiskardo Φισκάρδο
- Community
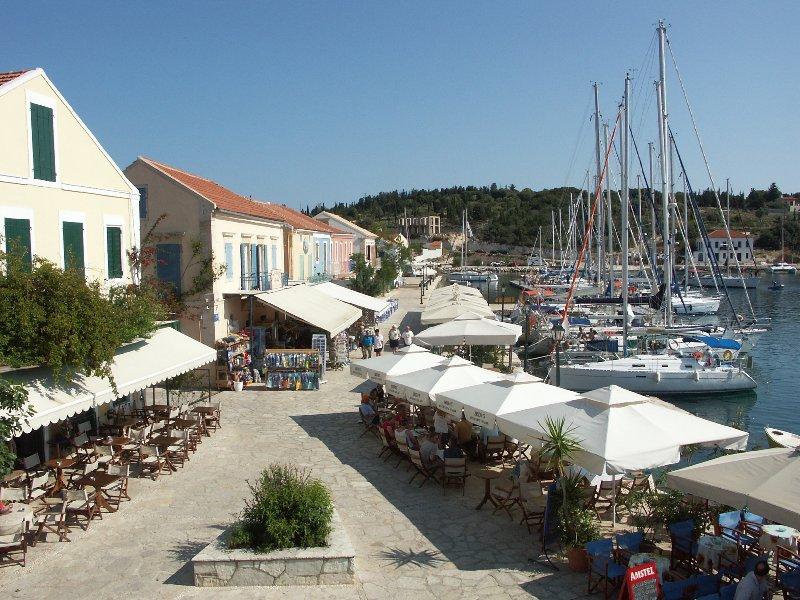

- Location within Greece
- Coordinates: 38°27′32″N 20°34′35″E
- Country: Greece
- Administrative region: Ionian Islands
- Regional unit: Kefalonia
- Municipality: Sami
- Municipal unit: Erisos

Population (2021)
  - Community: 322
- Time zone: UTC+2 (EET)
  - Summer (DST): UTC+3 (EEST)
- Postal code: 280 84
- Area code: 26740

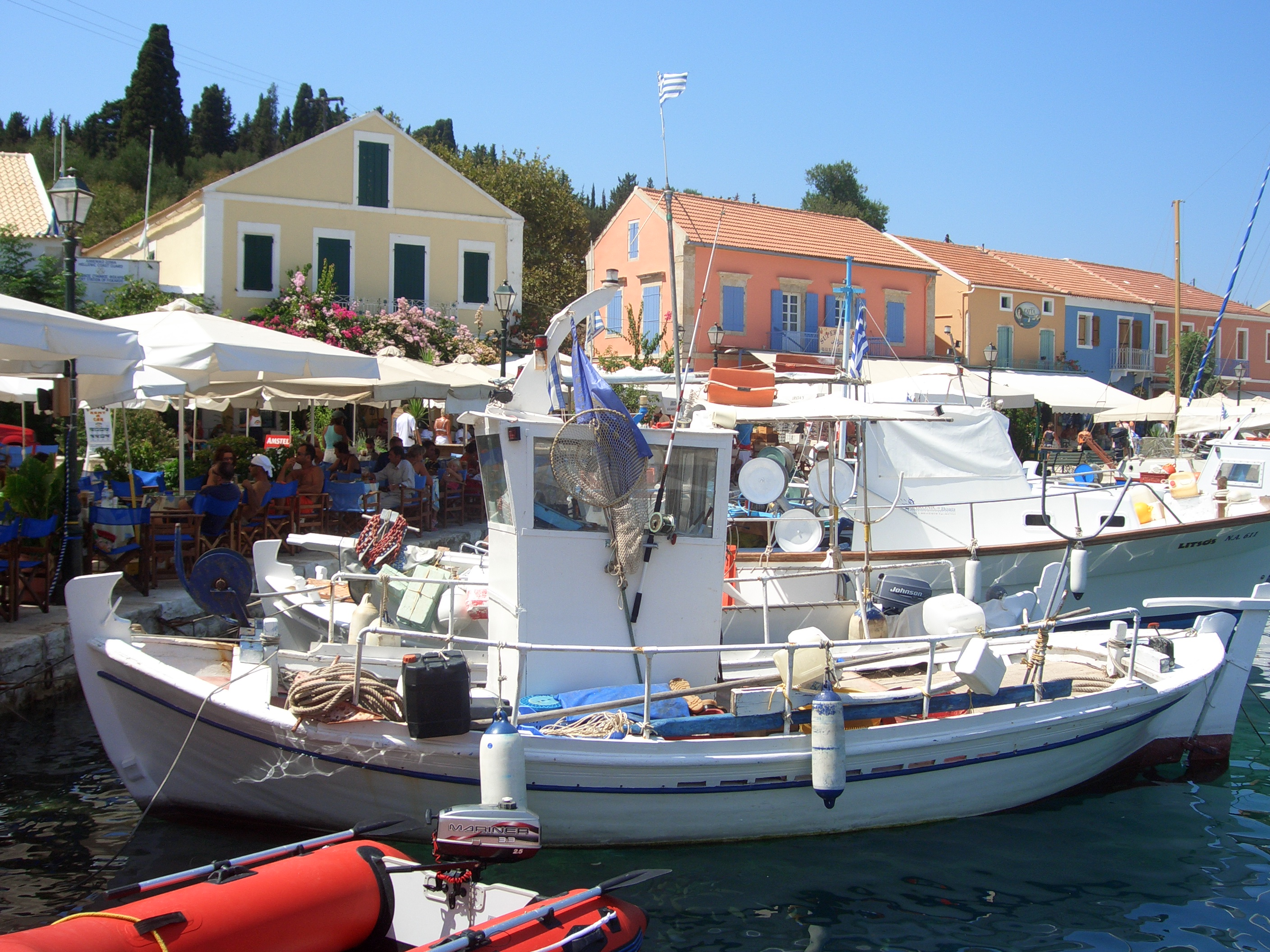
A view of Fiskardo

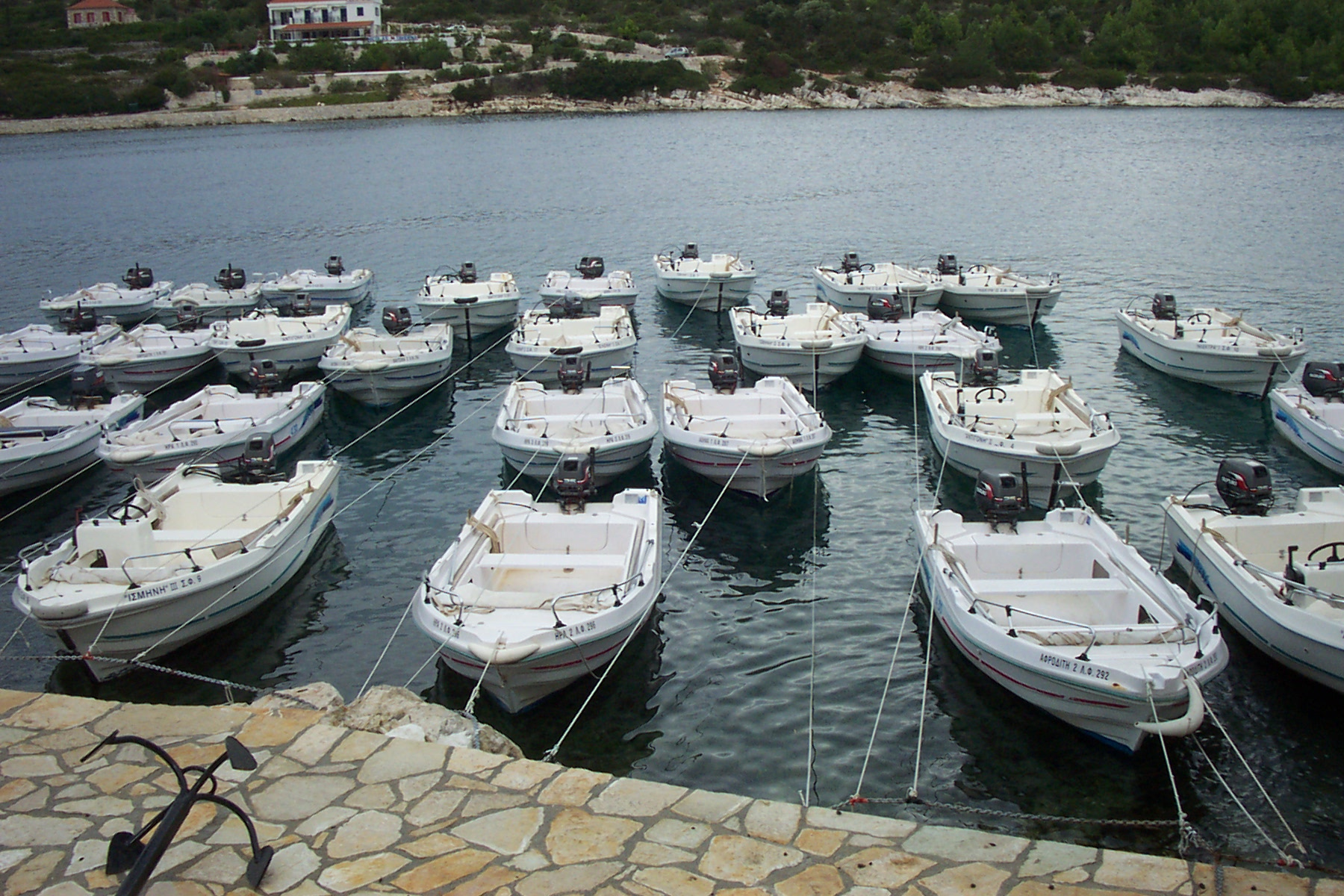

Fiskardo (Greek: Φισκάρδο, also Fiscardo or in the past Viscardo) is a village and a community on the Ionian island of Kefalonia, Greece. It is part of the municipal unit of Erisos. It is the northernmost port of Kefalonia, a short distance from Ithaca. Fiskardo has a small and diminishing fishing fleet. The coast around Fiskardo is mainly rocky with numerous pebble-beached coves. The port serves ferry routes to the ports of Frikes (Ithaca) and Lefkada. It is 5 km north of Vasilikades, 24 km north of Sami and 32 km north of Argostoli. Cephalonia International Airport is 61 km to the south, by road (about 1½ hours). The community of Fiskardo consists of the villages Fiskardo, Evreti, Katsarata, Matsoukata and Tselentata.

Fiskardo is also the name of the two kilometre long bay in which the port is located. Fiskardo and the dense forest in the surrounding area have been declared areas of great natural beauty and are protected under Greek law. In recent years a small tourist industry has developed, centred on luxury villas in the area around the village.

In 2026, Fiskardo was the first destination for the travellers in the 2026 series of the BBC programme Race Across the World.

== History ==
Fiskardo has been identified with the ancient town Panormos, mentioned by the 5th-century BC Greek historian Herodotus. In late 2005, when building a shopping complex close to the harbour in Fiscardo, workers discovered a plaque dating back to ancient Greece which gave thanks to the people of Panormos from the people of Athens for allowing them to hunt in the area. In late 2006 construction workers building a new hotel near the centre of Fiskardo stumbled upon a perfectly preserved Roman-era grave complex filled with gold jewellery, glass, clay pots and bronze artefacts. The complex measures 6.1 meters by 7.9 meters and is the shape of small house. Inside, five burial sites were found including a large vaulted grave and a stone coffin, as well as gold jewellery, pottery and bronze offerings. Archaeologists found gold earrings and rings, gold leaves that may have been attached to ceremonial clothing, as well as glass and clay pots, bronze artefacts decorated with masks, a bronze lock and copper coins. On a nearby plot, archaeologists also discovered a remarkably well-preserved theatre with their stone back rests still in place. Other excavations have uncovered remains of houses, a baths complex and a cemetery, all dating to Roman times - between 146 B.C. and 330 A.D. The Greek Culture Ministry said at the time that the find is unique. “Nothing else like it has ever been discovered on any Ionian island," said a ministry spokesman. “The site was missed by grave robbers and was untouched when opened. It is so perfectly preserved that the 2000-year-old ancient door still swings open smoothly on stone pivots.”

During the time of Frankish (Norman) dominion in Greece, the village was renamed Fiskardo after Robertus Wiscardus (Robert Guiscard), Duke of Apulia and Calabria and founder of the Kingdom of Sicily, who died at the Atheras beach in 1085. In the 18th century, the port became the commercial harbor of Erisos. Unlike most of Cephalonia, Fiskardo escaped from destruction by the 1953 Ionian earthquake and it has kept its original architecture. The poet and writer Nikos Kavvadias (1910-1975) lived in Fiskardo.

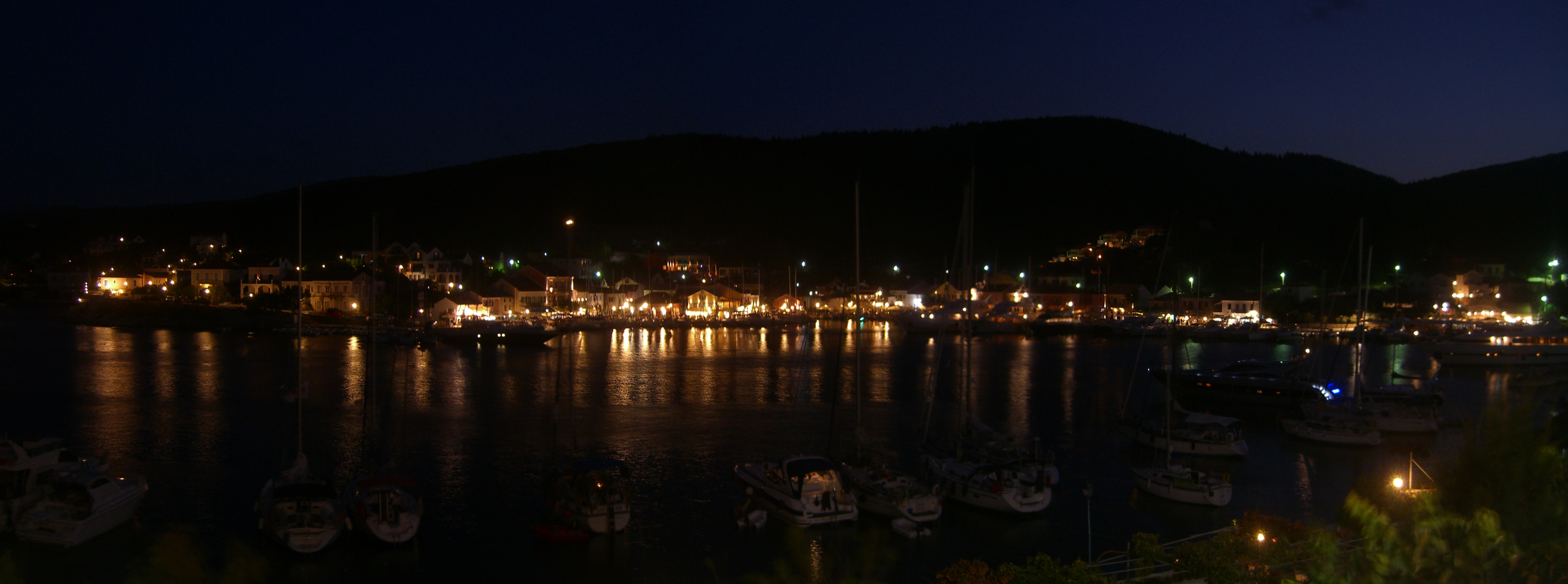
A panoramic view of the harbour at night

== Historical population ==
Year	Population village	Population community
1981	193	-
1991	158	-
2001	225	447
2011	189	295
2021	177	322

== See also ==
- List of settlements in Cephalonia
