= Panormus (Cephalonia) =

Coordinates: 38°27′45″N 20°34′34″E

Panormus or Panormos (Ancient Greek: Πάνορμος) was an ancient harbour on the coast of the island of Cephalonia, mentioned by Herodotus.

Its site is located near the modern Fiskardo.
