= Pylaros =

Pylaros Πύλαρος
- Municipal unit
- Location within the regional unit

- Location within Greece
- Coordinates: 38°19′N 20°34′E
- Country: Greece
- Administrative region: Ionian Islands
- Regional unit: Kefalonia
- Municipality: Sami

Area
  - Municipal unit: 81.1 km^{2} (31.3 sq mi)

Population (2021)
  - Municipal unit: 1,422
  - Municipal unit density: 17.5/km^{2} (45.4/sq mi)
- Time zone: UTC+2 (EET)
  - Summer (DST): UTC+3 (EEST)
- Vehicle registration: ΚΕ

Pylaros (Greek: Πύλαρος) is a former municipality on the island of Kefalonia, Ionian Islands, Greece. Since the 2019 local government reform it is part of the municipality Sami, of which it is a municipal unit. It is located in the north-central part of the island. It has a land area of 81.112 km² and a population of 1,422 inhabitants (2021 census). The seat of the municipality and largest town is Agia Effimia.

== Geography ==
In the north Pylaros borders on the municipal unit of Erisos, and on the border lies Kalo Mountain (901m) and Cape Agriosyko. In the south it borders on the municipal units of Argostoli and Sami, and on the border lies the mountain Agia Dynati (1131m). Pylaros forms a valley between the two mountains, and through it flows the river Xeropotamos. The valley of Pylaros is covered by forests, and contains many rare species of fauna.

To the east lies the bay of Agia Effimia, and to the west it borders on the peninsula of Paliki. At the western frontier is the tableland of Falari and the Gulf of Myrtos. The beach at Myrtos has been voted the best Greek beach on eleven occasions, and is considered one of the best in the world.

== Subdivisions ==
The municipal unit Pylaros is subdivided into the communities Agia Effimia, Divarata and Makryotika. It consists of 24 villages:

- Agia Effimia
- Makryotika
- Divarata
- Bekatorata
- Antipata
- Logarata
- Loukata
- Drakata
- Markata
- Vasilopoulata
- Potamianata
- Lekatsata
- Anomeria
- Krini
- Hamolakkos
- Xeropotamos
- Drakopoulata
- Feredinata
- Tarkasata
- Georgakata
- Karousata
- Dendrinata
- Rautopoulata
- Siniori

== Economy ==
The economy of the municipality is based on tourism and dairy farming. In the tablelands of Kalo Mountain, and at the tableland of Falari the main industry is stock-breeding and cheese-making. In bygone days, many of the inhabitants of Pylaros were cheese-makers, and they travelled to Italy and Balkans to make cheese. It is sometimes said that in Falari they produce the best Greek Feta cheese.

Agriculture is well-developed in regions next to Agia Effimia, but tourism is the most important source of income. The region in summer is a mecca for tourists from all over the world, and most of them go to the famous beach at Myrtos. There are hotels, rooms to let, cafes, taverns and shops with souvenirs. In the 19th century, many Pylarians were sailors, shipowners and merchants: they had many ships, and they travelled all over the Mediterranean and the Black Sea. But few people are involved in these trades today.

== History ==
Pylaros has had a long and significant history, and even the name is ancient. It is thought that the name originates from the ancient words πύλη ("gate") and άρω ("pick up") —that is to say "pick up the gates", because Pylaros is between two "gates": the bays of Agia Efimia and Myrtos. The first historical indications we have are from the Mycenean age. Mycenean vases and huge walls from ancient fortifications have been discovered in Karousata, Logarata and Agia Effimia.

According to a theory there was a sanctuary at Agia Dynati that, because of its shape (it resemble a rock covered with swadding-clothes) was considered to be the rock that Rea gave Cronus to eat to prevent him from eating her children, Zeus. When Zeus gained power, he obliged Cronus to throw the rock in the site of Agia Dynati. At ancient times, Pylaros must have been inhabited, but remains haven't been discovered yet.

At Roman times, Pylaros was a region for amusement of Roman officials, which is proved by a Roman villa discovered in Agia Efimia. At Byzantine times, Pylaros belonged to the "Thema of Kefalonia", one of the prefectures of the Byzantine Empire. The most ancient monastery in Pylaros, the Moni of Panagia Thematon (from the word "Thema") and the yet undiscovered monastery of Agios Polatos, may have been built during those years.

The time of Venetian occupation, probably saw the establishment of the first modern villages (Anomeria, Markata, Karousata, Antypata), and some families (Karousoi, Antypes) have been registered to the "Libro d' Oro". During the time of British occupation, Pylaros was a centre of great rebellions against the British.

During World War II, Pylarians participated in the Greek-Italian war of 1940, the National Resistance and the Greek Civil War. At Pylaros, as all over Kefalonia, many Italians from the 33 Infantry Division Acqui were massacred by the Germans at the famous "Massacre of the Division Acqui", known from the film "Captain Corellis Mandolin". Many Italians were murdered at the site "Madria tou Lala", at Falari.

During the Greek Civil War, some Pylarians were members of the communist Democratic Army of Greece and fought against the Hellenic Army. Two of the last captains of the Democratic Army, Matthaios Kouloubis and Ilias Kougianos who were murdered at September 1949, were Pylarians. (Kefalonia΄s Democratic Army was the last team of communist soldiers in action until December 1949).

Finally in 1953, Pylaros was damaged by the terrible earthquakes that shaked the Ionian Islands. Some days later, the injured inhabitants were visited by the King George II.

== Famous individuals ==
- Marinos Antypas (1873–1907) was one of the first Greek Socialists. He started off in Kefalonia, but later moved to Thessaly where he incited farmers against their landowners, which resulted in his murder in 1907. His example helped inspire the Great Agrarian Revolution at Kileler in 1910.
- Evangelis Potamianos was fighter in the Greek Revolution of 1821.

== Traditions ==
Pylarians have many traditions and customs. In the summer each village holds a religious festival or panigiri dedicated to a particular saint. Pylaria is the origin of one of the two traditional dances of Kefalonia, the Divaratikos. Pylarian is also known for its poetry, which is characteristically sarcastic.
