= Luca Cancellari =

Byzantine icon painter

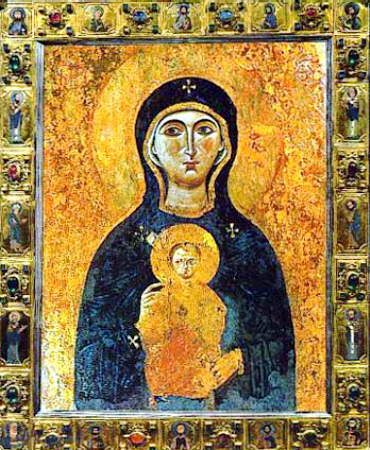
Madonna Nicopeia (after the theft of the icon's jewels), St Mark's Basilica in Venice

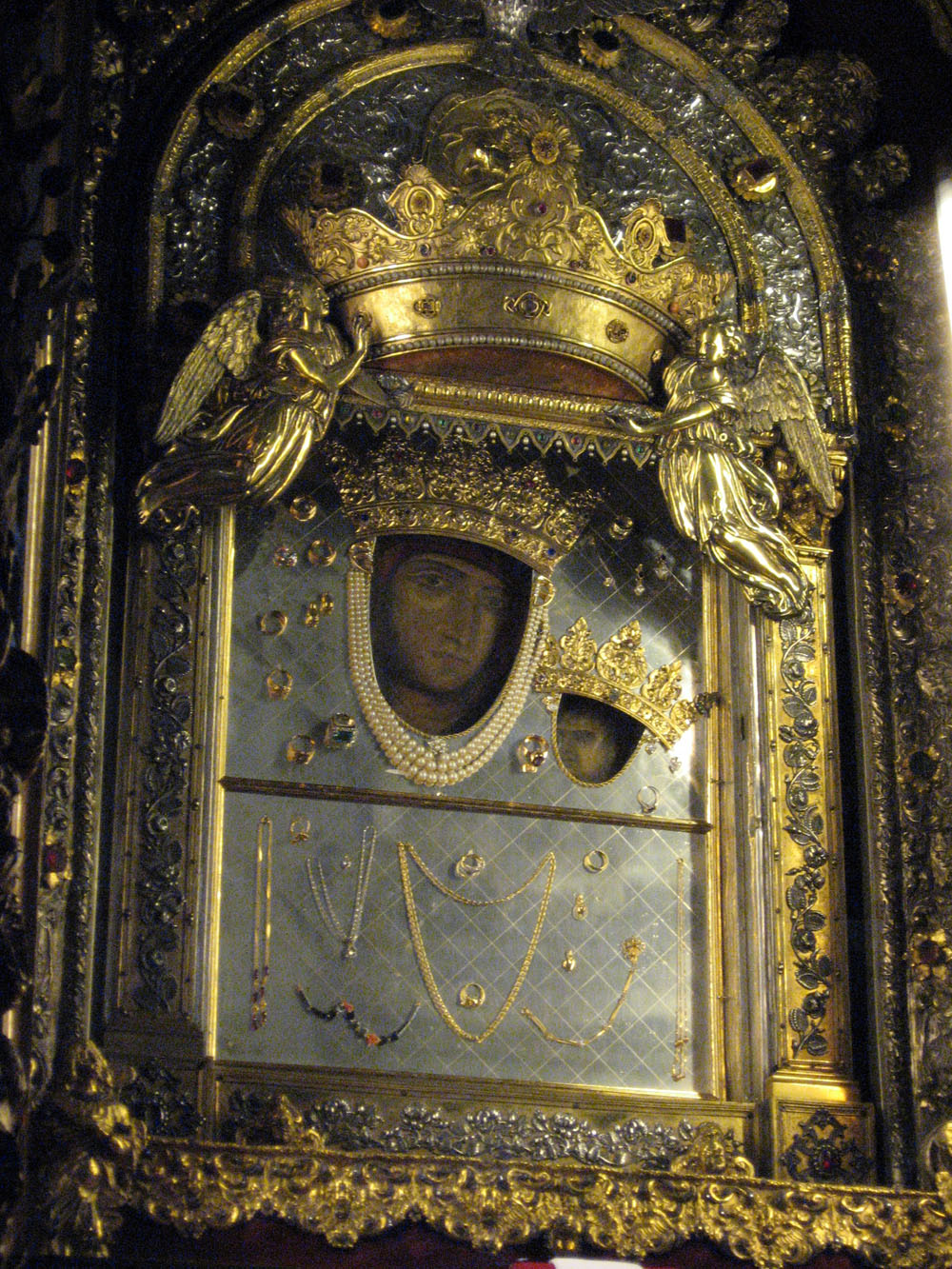
Madonna di San Luca, Sanctuary of the Madonna di San Luca in Bologna

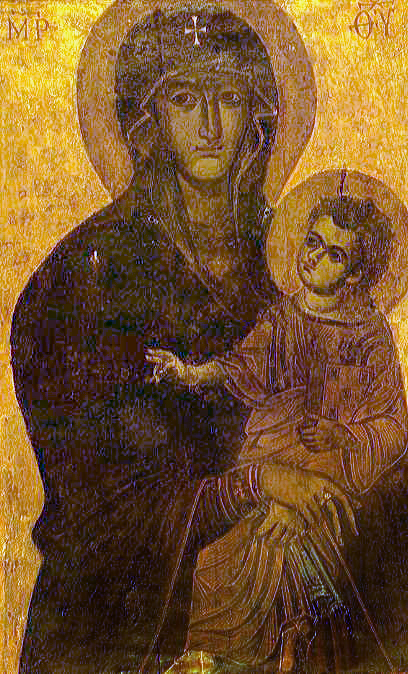
Madonna Salus Populi Romani, in the Basilica di Santa Maria Maggiore in Rome

Luca Cancellari (Luke Cangellaris; Greek: Λουκάς Καγκελλάρης) is a Byzantine icon painter posited in some modern Greek encyclopaedias to have lived during the 12th century in Constantinople, where he painted some of the best icons of Virgin Mary.

These works ascribe him the creation of icons like:

- the Madonna Nicopeia in St Mark's Basilica, that ended up in Venice after the conquest of Constantinople by the Crusaders in 1204,
- the Madonna di San Luca in the namesake Sanctuary, transferred in Bologna in 1160 and bearing the inscription Opus Lucae Cancellari, or as read by Antonio Masini (1599–1691) Cancellarii,
- the Madonna Salus Populi Romani in the Basilica di Santa Maria Maggiore in Rome
- and other with Greek inscriptions of that period.

Giovanni Lami, who strongly opposed that Saint Luke the Evangelist was a painter, thought that the icon of Madonna di San Luca was executed by a certain Luca Santo, a Florentin painter of the 14th century. He alleged that Luca Santo was the son of a nominated Cancelliere and considered improbable the claim that this icon was brought from Constantinople.

== See also ==
- Cangelari family

== Sources ==
- Pietro Zani, Enciclopedia Metodica Critico-Ragionata delle Arte, Parma 1817-28 (in Italian)
- Eleftheroudakis Encyclopedia, Athens 1929 (in Greek)
- Helios Newest Encyclopedia, Athens 1977 (in Greek)
- Haris Patsis New Grand Hellenic Encyclopedia, Athens 1980 (in Greek)
- Miklós Boskovits, A Corpus of Florentine Painting - The Origins of Florentine Painting 1100–1270, Florence 1994
- Bruce Cole, Studies in the history of Italian art 1250–1550, New York 1996
