= List of bets =

This is a list of bets, both verified and unverified, that have achieved fame.

- Ancient world: Cleopatra supposedly bet her lover Mark Antony that she could spend the enormous sum of 10 million sesterces on a single meal. She allegedly dissolved an extremely valuable pearl in some vinegar and drank it.
- c. 1746: Allegedly, Earl Fitzwilliam had a 45 feet (14 m) pyramid built with an archway (The Needle's Eye) because he had wagered that he could drive a coach through a needle's eye.
- 18th century: The physically fit Richard Barry, 7th Earl of Barrymore, supposedly was challenged by a rotund butcher named Mr. Bullock to a 100-yard (91 m) foot race, the conditions being that Bullock be given a 35-yard (32 m) head start and the choice of the course to be run. Bullock selected a narrow lane. Barry quickly caught up with his opponent, but there was no room for him to get past.
- c. 1788: Thomas Whaley, an Irish gambler and politician, won bets totaling £15,000 (about £1.8 million in 2001) after he traveled to Jerusalem and back within two years. The region, part of the Ottoman Empire, was considered too dangerous for travelers.
- c. 1793: Jane Gordon, Duchess of Gordon, bet the Prince of Wales (the future King George IV), that she could raise more troops for the war with Revolutionary France than he, i.e., the Government. Although she was 45 years old, she was still extremely attractive; she toured Scotland, eventually persuading 940 men to enlist in the newly formed Gordon Highlanders, and won the bet.
- 1872?: Horse breeder (former governor of California and co-founder of Stanford University) Leland Stanford allegedly wagered $25,000 that a horse, while running, had all four feet off the ground at the same time; he supposedly hired photographer Eadweard Muybridge to prove it. Whether there was a bet or—more likely—Stanford merely wanted to better analyze a horse's gait, Muybridge did take a series of photographs for him in June 1878, the basis of The Horse in Motion, which showed the horse's feet in the air at the same time.
- November 1872: Not long after the end of the American Civil War, in which many of the English had sympathized with the South, Gilbert Bates wagered $1000 to $100 that he could walk the length of England carrying the American flag without being insulted. He won.
- between 1957 and 1960: Bennett Cerf bet Dr. Seuss (Cerf was Seuss's publisher) that Seuss could not write a book with a vocabulary of only 50 words. Seuss wrote Green Eggs and Ham, using and reusing exactly that number.
- c. 1977: George Lucas visited Steven Spielberg while the latter was making Close Encounters of the Third Kind. Struggling with his own production and impressed by what he saw of Spielberg's work, Lucas offered to trade 2.5% of the points (profits) of their films. Close Encounters made much money, but less than Star Wars. Spielberg is still collecting the difference to this day (an estimate $12.5 million as of 1978).
- 1980 and 1984: On September 24, 1980, William Lee Bergstrom walked into the Horseshoe Casino in Las Vegas with two suitcases, one containing $777,000, the other empty. The Horseshoe had a unique policy, which set a gambler's maximum bet limit at the first wager placed. Bergstrom bet the entire amount on the don't pass line in craps and, after several rolls, won. The winnings went into the second suitcase. On March 24, 1984, he returned to the Horseshoe and bet $538,000, again in craps and again won. Finally on November 16 the same year, Bergstrom placed his largest craps bet: $1,000,000. This time he lost.
- April 11, 2004: Ashley Revell sold all his possessions and bet £76,840 on one roll of the roulette wheel in Las Vegas. He doubled his money when the ball landed on a red number.
- Scientific wager, a list of examples

== See also ==
- For sale: baby shoes, never worn, a six-word story allegedly written by Ernest Hemingway on a bet
