= Marinos Antypas =

Greek politician

- Born: 1872; Ferentinata near Antypata Pylarou, Kefalonia, Greece
- Died: March 8, 1907 (aged 34–35); Pyrgetos, Greece
- Cause of death: Homicide
- Occupations: Lawyer; Journalist
- Known for: One of Greece's first socialists Victim of unsolved murder
- Parent(s): Spyros Antypas; Angelina Klada

Marinos Antypas (Greek: Μαρίνος Αντύπας; 1872 – March 8, 1907) was a Greek lawyer, journalist, and critic who was one of the country's first socialists. He founded publications which were shuttered, was repeatedly arrested for his social criticism, and eventually, assassinated.

== Background ==
He was born in the village Ferentinata near Antypata Pylarou, in Kefalonia, the eldest son of Spyros Antypas and Angelina Klada. He had two siblings, Babis and Adelais. In Argostoli he became a freemason.

During his studies in Athens, he became a member of the Central Socialist Society. He participated as a voluntary soldier in the Cretan Revolt of 1897–1898, during which he was injured. On account of his later criticism of the role of the Greek monarchy in the insurrection, he was imprisoned and exiled to the island of Aegina. An order from the Ministry of Justice declared: "Antypas should be placed in isolation and no one should talk to him. If he doesn't comply with this he should be confined to his cell and be served food without salt".

In 1900 he returned to Kefalonia, where he published the journal Anastasi, which was closed down by the authorities because of its content. In the same period he worked with his father, a carpenter but also a wood sculptor (one of his works is preserved in the Church of Saint Gregory in Hamolako Pilarou).

At that time he was the Godparent of two girls, naming one Anarchia (Anarchy) and the other Epanastasi (Revolution). He also established the "People's Reading Place" (Greek: Λαικό Αναγνωστήριο) "Equality" which became the center of political and spiritual debate on the island.

In 1903 he visited his uncle Gerasimos Skiadaresis in Bucharest and convinced him to buy farming land in Greece. Antypas returned again to Kefalonia and republished his Anastasi newspaper, for which he was arrested but found innocent in the following trial. His Socialist Radical party participated in the 1906 general election but won few votes.

After that he left for Pyrgetos (Larissa regional unit) where his uncle had bought a large estate. There he began to agitate over the rights of farmers. One of his suggestions was that the farmers should not work on Sundays but use that day to take their children to school. His teachings were received positively by the farmers but the owners of the agrarian estates disliked him. They paid 30,000 drachmas to a supervisor named Kyriakou to kill Antypas, which he did on March 8, 1907. Kyriakou was never convicted for the crime.

His death and the spreading of his ideas into land workers sparkled protests that lead to the Kileler uprising in March 1910.

== Ideology ==
According to professor Panagiotis Noutsos he was influenced by Jean Jaurès.

== Mentions of Antypas ==
- In Pylaros there is a statue of Antypas, in the "Myloi" area where he once held a speech.
- Blood on the Land is a 1966 Greek film starring Nikos Kourkoulos, that partly depicts Antypas' campaign and assassination. It was nominated for the 1966 Academy Award for Best Foreign Language Film.

== See also ==
- List of unsolved murders (1900–1979)

== Sources ==
- Spiros D. Loukatos, Marinos Sp. Antypas, His Life, Era, Ideology, Actions and his Assassination, Athens 1980.
- George N. Moschopoulos, History of Kefalonia (A Synopsis of the author's two-volume book), trans. Angelica Vrettou, n.p. 2002, pp. 88–95, ISBN 960-90811-2-6
