= Kileler uprising =

1910 farmer protest in Greece

The Kileler uprising occurred in Kileler, Thessaly, Kingdom of Greece, in March 1910, when local farmers engaged in mass protests against the extended privileges of landowners and the limitation of their own rights. The protest was brutally suppressed by the local militia; more than four protesters were killed and many more were wounded.

== Background ==
Even though the mainly agricultural province of Thessaly was transferred from the Ottoman Empire to the Kingdom of Greece through the Convention of Constantinoupole in 1881, rural areas continued for many years to be regulated through the Chiflik system, which derived from the Ottoman times. While the Chiflik owners held a semi-feudal status and received part of the agricultural output, they were obliged to provide housing for their farmers and were not allowed to apply forced labor. In 1881, another land workers' revolt occurred in the nearby village of Sklatina (current name Rizoma). As the living and working conditions of the farmers worsened, protests became more frequent, especially after the assassination of figures like the activist Marinos Antypas. The promises of Eleftherios Venizelos during his 1910 parliamentary election campaign concerning agricultural reform further aggravated the farmers.

== Main events ==
In March 1910, the farmers organized a mass protest in Larissa and villagers from many areas of the prefecture traveled to the city. The Kileler incident began when several hundred farmers tried to travel by train to Larissa without buying tickets. When their request was rejected, the farmers backed down, but a confrontation occurred between them and the station supervisor, who asked for the intervention of the local militia; they attacked the farmers, killing two of them and wounding many others. When the train reached the station of Tsoular (modern Melia), it did not stop to pick up farmers, two of whom were shot dead by the militia located inside the train. As news of the killings spread in Larissa, clashes between the militia and the protesters became frequent.

== Aftermath ==
Many of the farmers were tried for the events of the protests, but none were sentenced.

Eventually the need of the central government to use farmers as recruits and, after 1922, the settlement of refugees from Asia Minor in Greece, led to the implementation of a 1917 law regarding land redistribution.
