= Nick Dandolos =

Greek gambler and high roller (1883–1966)

- Born: Nikolaos Andreas Dandolos; April 27, 1883; Rethymno, Crete, Ottoman Empire
- Died: December 25, 1966 (aged 83); Gardena, California, U.S.
- Occupation: Professional gambler

Nikolaos Andreas Dandolos (Greek: Νικόλαος Ανδρέας Δάνδολος [niˈkolaos anˈðɾeas ˈðanðolos]; April 27, 1883 – December 25, 1966), commonly known as Nick the Greek, was a Greek professional gambler and high roller.

== Early life ==
Dandolos was the son of wealthy parents. He attended the Greek Evangelical College and earned a degree in philosophy. When he was 18 years old, his grandfather sent him to the United States with an allowance of $150 per week. Although Dandolos settled in Chicago he eventually moved to Montreal where he began gambling on horse races.

Dandolos was known throughout his life for winning and losing large sums of money. After winning over $500,000 on horse racing, he moved back to Chicago where he lost it all on card and dice games. He quickly became a master of these games, however, and became a prime attraction at casinos when he would play in them.

== Poker and gambling ==
From January 1949 to May 1949, Dandolos played a two-person "heads up" poker match against poker legend Johnny Moss where the two played virtually every variation of the game that existed at the time. The game, set up by Benny Binion as a tourist attraction, is widely credited as being the inspiration for the modern day World Series of Poker.

At the end of this five-month poker marathon, down an estimated $2–4 million, Dandolos uttered what has become one of the most famous poker quotes ever: "Mr. Moss, I have to let you go."

One urban legend claims that Dandolos once had the opportunity to escort Albert Einstein around Las Vegas. Thinking that his gambling friends may not be familiar with him, Dandolos allegedly introduced Einstein as "Little Al from Princeton" and stated that he "controlled a lot of the numbers action around Jersey." According to Dandolos's own testimony in Gambling Secrets of Nick the Greek, just before the end of World War II, he got a call from a friend at the US State Department. The caller said that there was someone who was looking for a poker game on a weekend in Manhattan. Dandolos reminded his friend that gambling is illegal in New York, but his friend said that he would see to it that no law enforcement would get involved. At the game, according to Dandolos, he introduced Albert Einstein as "Little Al from Jersey."

Another urban legend has him winning one million dollars against a Texan. In the early hours of the morning, Dandolos felt tired and called an end to the game. The Texan accused him of chickening out while the going was good. Dandolos then called for a new deck of cards, shuffled them and asked the Texan if he wanted to cut the cards (high card wins) one time, for double or quit. The Texan declined and they went home.

Nobel Prize–winning physicist Richard Feynman also met Dandolos, according to the autobiographical Surely You're Joking, Mr. Feynman! Dandolos explained how he won big not by playing the tables, but by knowing the odds at the tables and betting against others who have superstitious beliefs about the outcome. He then relied on his reputation to bet against others.

In Eliot Asinof's Eight Men Out, the author attributes this gambling wisdom to Dandolos: "Never bet on anything that can talk."

== Later life ==
Near the end of his life, Dandolos was near-broke and playing $5 limit draw poker games in Gardena, California. When asked by a fellow player how he could once play for millions and now be playing for such small stakes, Dandolos supposedly replied, "Hey, it's action, isn't it?".

=== Death ===
He died on Christmas Day in 1966. He was a charter inductee of the Poker Hall of Fame in 1979.

== Legacy ==
It's estimated that he won and lost over $500 million in his lifetime. He himself claimed that he went from rags to riches over 73 times. He donated over $20 million to education and charity.

A book by Ted Thackrey was published in 1968 titled Gambling Secrets of Nick the Greek.

A novel about Dandolos' life was written by Harry Mark Petrakis in 1978 titled Nick the Greek.

== In popular culture ==
In the Damon Runyon short story, "Romance in the Roaring Forties", Dandolos is mentioned by name, as a guest at the Prohibition-era New York wedding of Miss Billy Perry. Other guests are Waldo Winchester (a thinly-disguised Walter Winchell), Skeets Boliver, Feet Samuels, and Good Time Charley Bernstein, showing Dandolos as part of the louche guys-and-dolls culture of Broadway in the Roaring Twenties.

He also appears in Runyon's short story "Blood Pressure", playing at Nathan Detroit's floating crap game in New York. The unnamed narrator has been dragged into the game by a gangster, and notes that it is more than somewhat full of very tough guys indeed, there with some of the town's highest rollers:

But there they are wedged up against the table with Nick the Greek, Big Nig, Grey John, Okay Okun, and many other high shots, and they all have big coarse G notes [thousand dollar bills] in their hands which they are tossing around back and forth as if these G notes are nothing but pieces of waste paper.

A brief appearance is made by Dandolos at a party in Runyon's short story "Madame La Gimp", where he impersonates Heywood Broun.

In "Shotgun", the fifth episode in the fourth season of American crime drama television series Breaking Bad, Walter White gets called "Nick the Greek" by his brother-in-law Hank Schrader, as the latter thought that the former won a lot of money by playing blackjack with a special strategy.

== See also ==
- Archie Karas
- Nick Dandolos named as unindicted co-conspirator in Ray Ryan's attempted kidnapping/extortion
