= Kranaia =

Province of Cephalonia Prefecture, Greece

Coordinates: 38.13°N 20.64°E

Kranaia Province Επαρχία Κραναίας
- Province of Greece
- 2006
- Capital: Argostoli

Kranaia was one of the provinces of Cephalonia Prefecture of Greece. Its territory corresponded with that of the current municipal units Argostoli, Eleios-Pronnoi, Leivathos and Omala. Its seat was the town Argostoli. It was abolished in 2006.
