= Erisos =

Erisos Έρισος
- Municipal unit
- Location within the regional unit

- Location within Greece
- Coordinates: 38°24′N 20°35′E
- Country: Greece
- Administrative region: Ionian Islands
- Regional unit: Kefalonia
- Municipality: Sami

Area
  - Municipal unit: 78.1 km^{2} (30.2 sq mi)

Population (2021)
  - Municipal unit: 1,601
  - Municipal unit density: 20.5/km^{2} (53.1/sq mi)
- Time zone: UTC+2 (EET)
  - Summer (DST): UTC+3 (EEST)
- Vehicle registration: ΚΕ

Erisos (Greek: Έρισος) is a former municipality on the island of Kefalonia, Ionian Islands, Greece. Since the 2019 local government reform it is part of the municipality Sami, of which it is a municipal unit. It is located in the northernmost part of the island and has a land area of 78.114 km². Its population was 1,601 at the 2021 census. The seat of the municipality was in Vasilikiades but more known are the two small harbours Fiskardo and Asos. Other towns are Antipáta, Mesovoúnia, and Komitáta.
