= Agia Effimia =

Agia Effimia Αγία Ευφημία
- Community
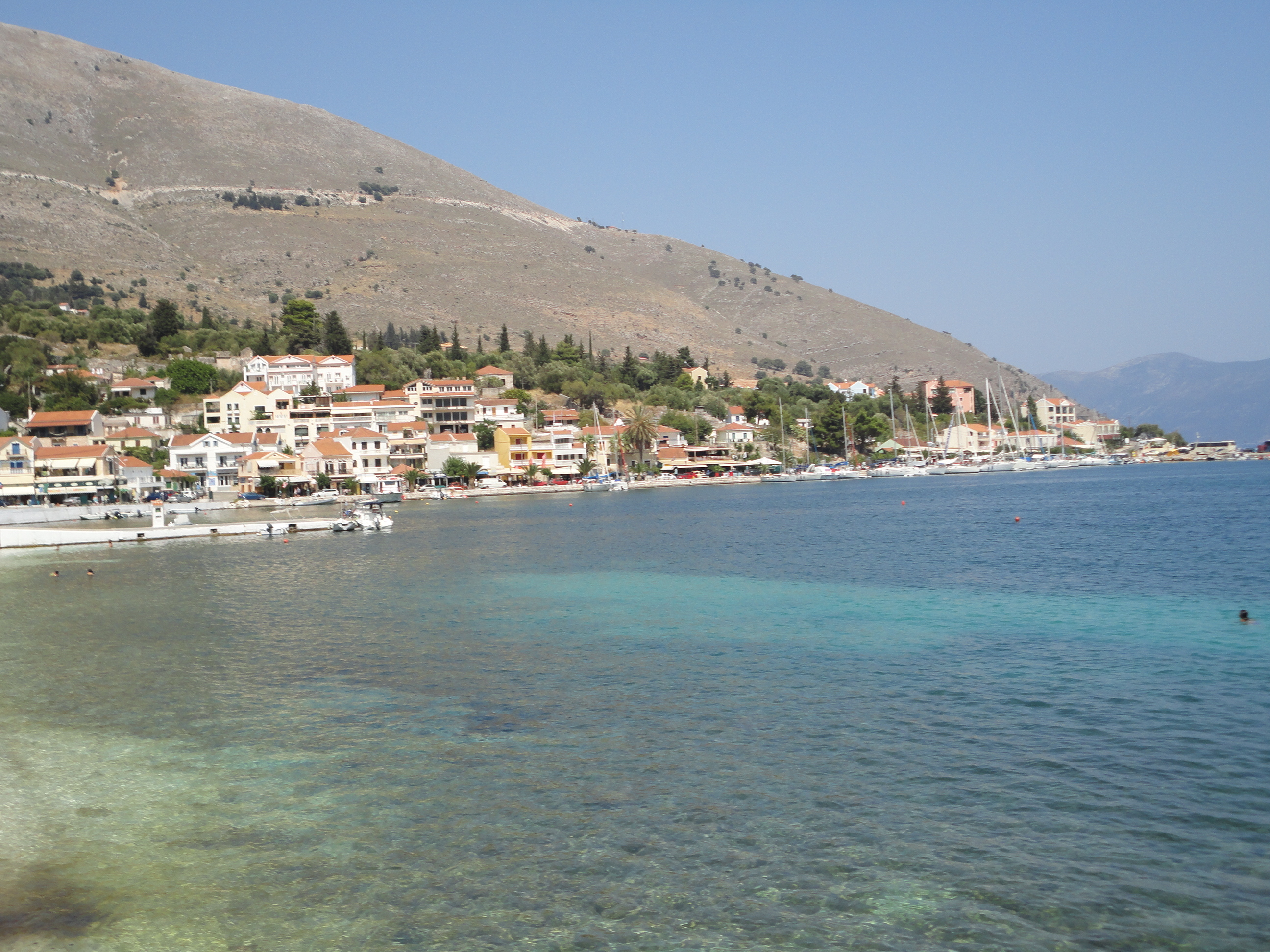

- Location within Greece
- Coordinates: 38°18.1′N 20°35.8′E
- Country: Greece
- Administrative region: Ionian Islands
- Regional unit: Kefalonia
- Municipality: Sami
- Municipal unit: Pylaros

Population (2021)
  - Community: 638
- Time zone: UTC+2 (EET)
  - Summer (DST): UTC+3 (EEST)
- Vehicle registration: ΚΕ

Agia Effimia (Greek: Αγία Ευφημία) is a village on the east coast of the island of Kefalonia (also spelled Cephalonia) in Greece. It was the seat of the former Pylaros municipality. It is a traditional fishing village centred on a small harbour. It contains a number of taverns, bars and shops, a traditional wood-fired bakery, as well as tourist accommodation and local residences. The main activity in the village is now centred on tourism. The harbour is popular with sailing holidays, and is the home to flotilla sailing groups. Many of the old buildings in Agia Efimia were destroyed in the 1953 earthquake, although a few original buildings survive. Its population is 638 (2021).
