= Sami, Cephalonia =

Sami Σάμη
- Municipality
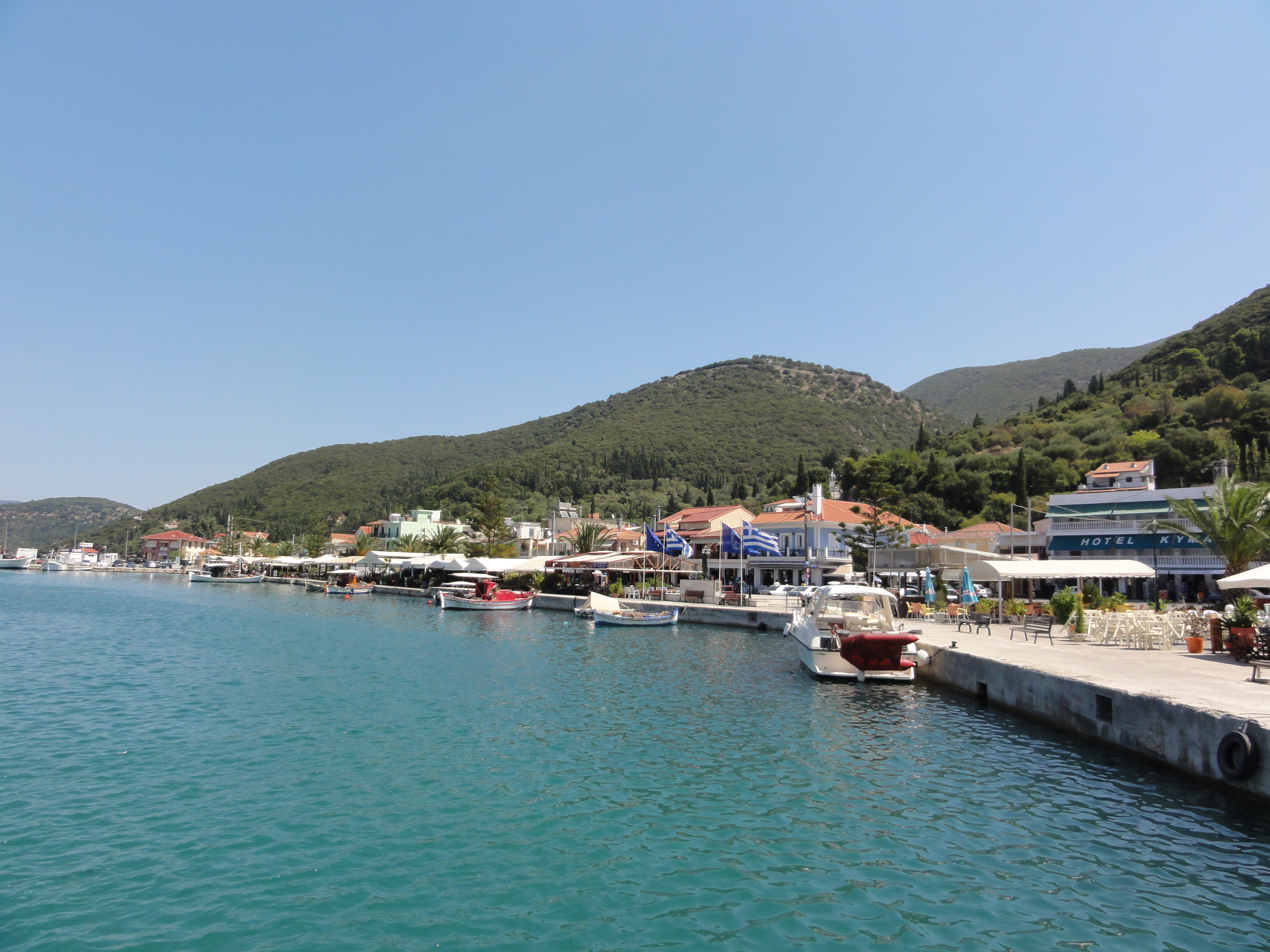
- View of Sami from the harbour

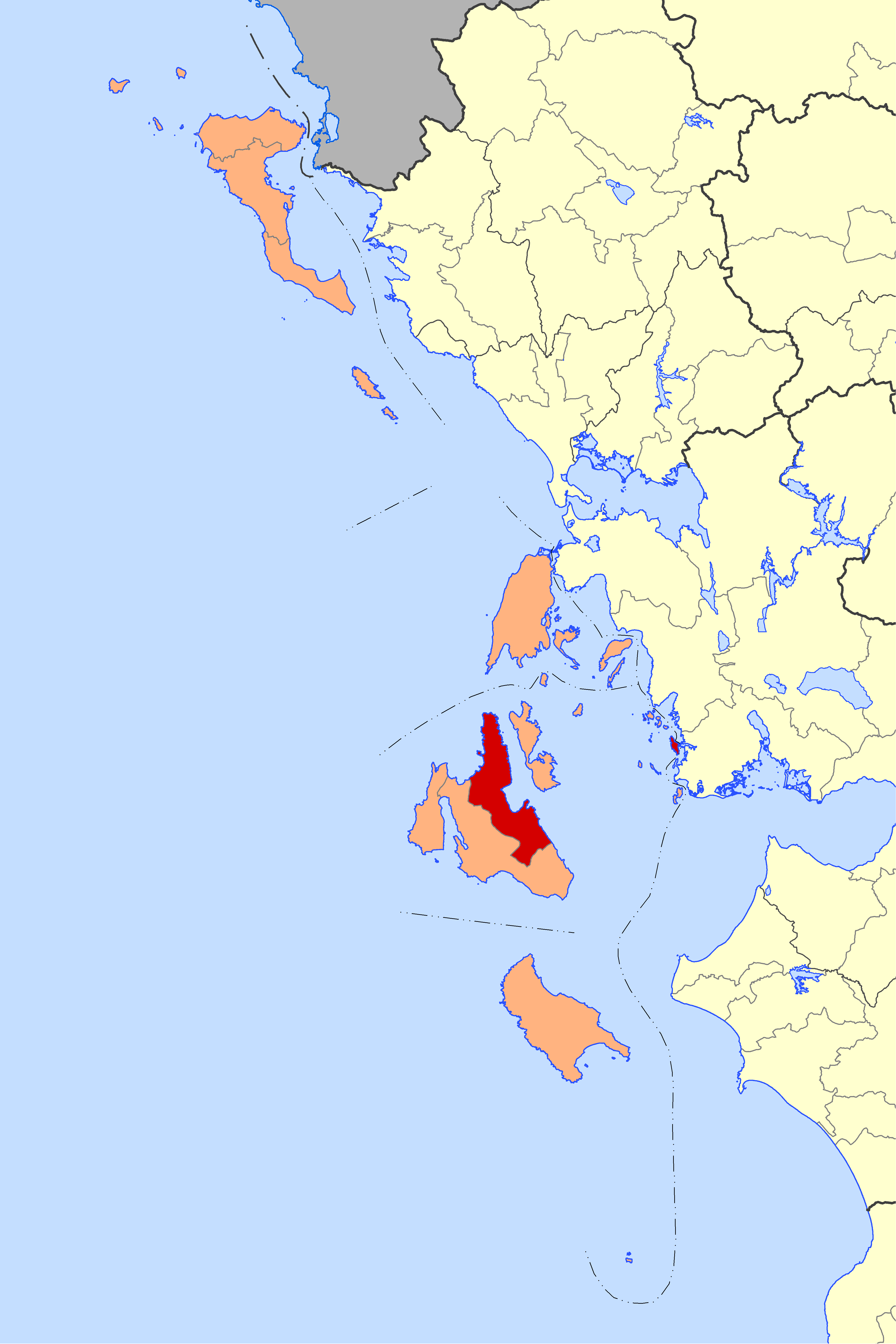
- Location within the regional unit

- Location within Greece
- Coordinates: 38°15′N 20°39′E
- Country: Greece
- Administrative region: Ionian Islands
- Regional unit: Cephalonia
- Municipality: Cephalonia

Area
  - Municipality: 291.2 km^{2} (112.4 sq mi)
  - Municipal unit: 129.3 km^{2} (49.9 sq mi)

Population (2021)
  - Municipality: 5,501
  - Density: 18.89/km^{2} (48.93/sq mi)
  - Municipal unit: 2,478
  - Municipal unit density: 19.16/km^{2} (49.64/sq mi)
  - Community: 1,078
- Time zone: UTC+2 (EET)
  - Summer (DST): UTC+3 (EEST)
- Vehicle registration: ΚΕ

Sami (Greek: Σάμη) is a town and a municipality on the island of Cephalonia, Ionian Islands, Greece. Since the 2019 local government reform it is one of the three municipalities on the island. It is located on the central east coast of the island. The municipality has an area of 291.2 km^{2} and the municipal unit (the pre-2010 municipality) has an area of 129.326 km². The 2021 census recorded a population of 2,478 in the municipal unit, and 5,501 in the municipality in its post-2019 extension. Its municipal seat is the town of Sami

West of town is the Melissani Cave, a major tourist attraction; boat tours are offered.

== Administration ==
Following the Kapodistrias reform of 1997, the community of Sami was united with the surrounding communities Grizata, Karavomylos, Poulata, Pyrgi and Chaliotata to form the larger municipality of Sami. As a result of the 2010 Kallikratis Programme, this municipality became a municipal unit of the municipality of Kefalonia, which covered the whole island. In 2019 three new municipalities were formed on the island, including Sami.

The municipality of Sami consists of the following municipal units (former municipalities):

- Erisos
- Pylaros
- Sami

The municipal unit of Sami is subdivided into the following communities:

- Chaliotata
- Grizata
- Karavomylos
- Poulata
- Pyrgi (Digaleto)
- Sami

=== Province ===
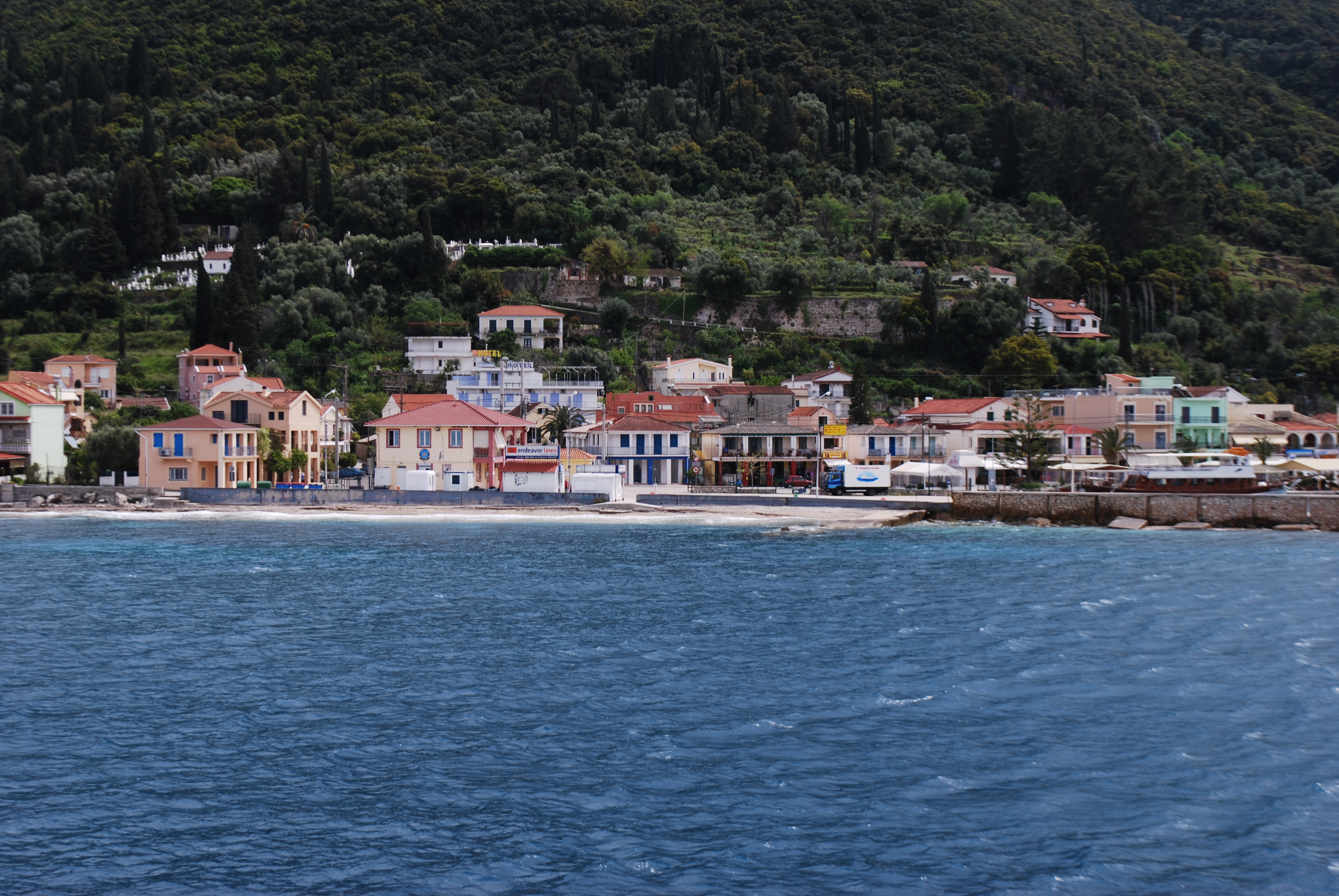
View of Sami

Sami Province (Greek: Επαρχία Σάμης) was one of the provinces of Cephalonia Prefecture. Its territory corresponded with that of the current municipality Sami. It was abolished in 2006.
