= Agios Dimitrios, Cephalonia =

Agios Dimitrios Άγιος Δημήτριος
- Settlement
- Location within Greece
- Coordinates: 38°13.9′N 20°25.8′E
- Country: Greece
- Administrative region: Ionian Islands
- Regional unit: Cephalonia
- Municipality: Lixouri
- Municipal unit: Paliki
- Time zone: UTC+2 (EET)
  - Summer (DST): UTC+3 (EEST)
- Postal code: 280 81
- Area code: 26710
- Vehicle registration: ΚΕ
- Website: www.paliki.gr

Agios Dimitrios is a village, about 2 miles (3.2 km) north of Lixouri in the Paliki peninsula of Cephalonia. The village which lies on the hillside just above the gulf of Argostoli and is a five-minute drive along the main road out of Lixouri.

== Geography ==
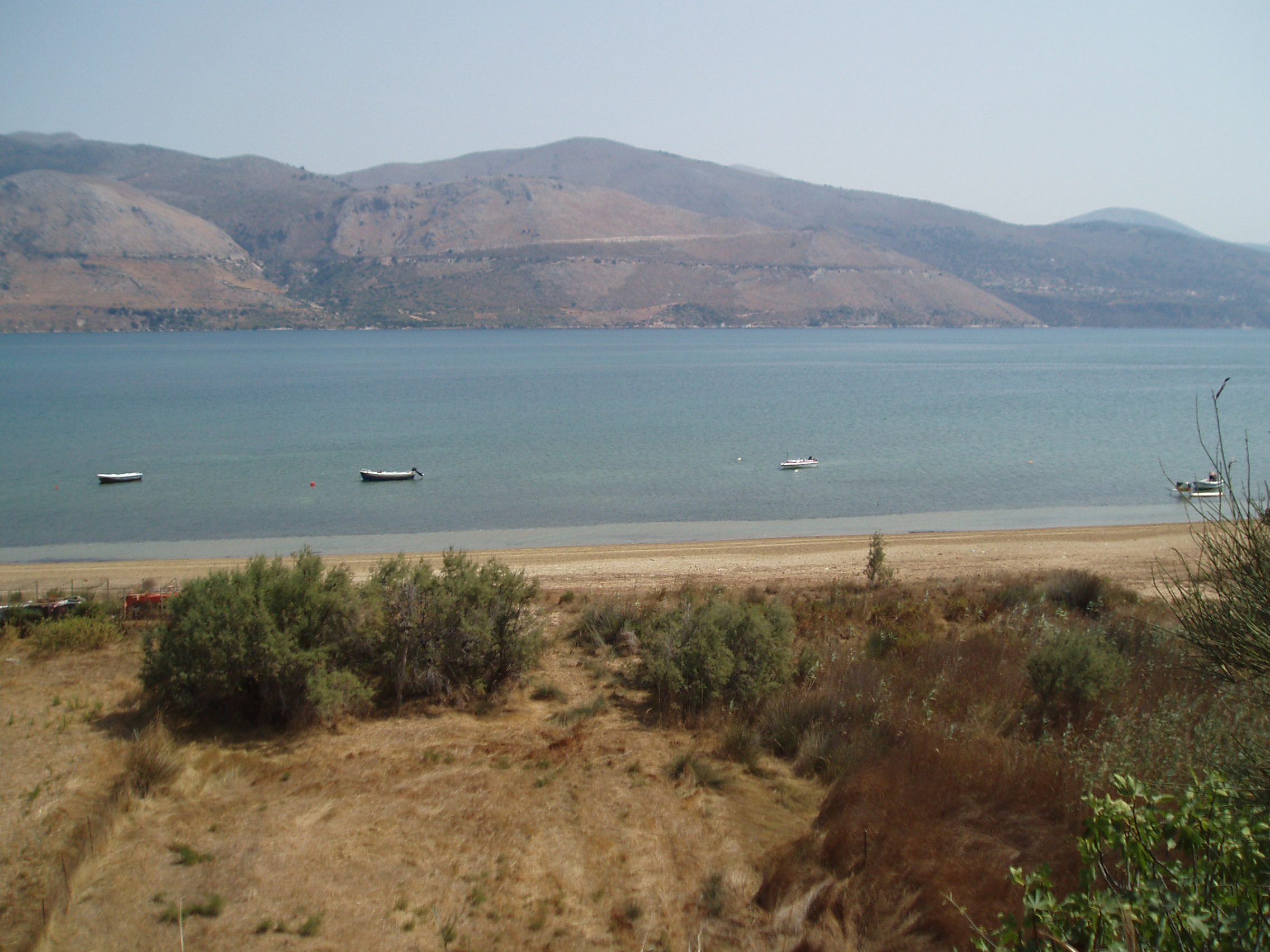
The Beach at Agios Dimitrios

The overall geography of Agios Dimitrios can be appreciated in a satellite view from Google Maps . The village largely straddles the main road running north from Lixouri. The immediate view from the main road is of small houses, a taverna, a variety holiday accommodation, including a two hotels. The area is rural and consists largely of agricultural land. There is a very low density of building.

Turning off from the main road to the East, towards the sea, brings one past small residences with some accommodation for renting and eventually down to the shoreline of the gulf of Argostoli. The shoreline is a long narrow strip of mainly sandy beach with scrub vegetation and no facilities. A small number of fishermen work from the area in small boats. The immediate sea is shallow with extensive weed beds. This area is known to be inhabited by turtles.

In addition to agriculture and tourism, a small activity in fishing is supported. Nearby to the south, just before the village, is an auto mechanics car workshop and garage.

== Amenities ==
In addition to the small number of local residences, there are various holiday accommodations, from bed & breakfast studios, villas and hotels. There are also small hotels, for example the Hotel Terra Mare with several acres of associated grounds in which holiday bungalows are set.

Taverna Angelos is renowned for its pizzas, is situated on the main street.

Another Taverna, Pharos, can be found by turning up a side road off the west side of the main street.

There are no shops or banks in the village. The nearest shops are back south on the main road towards Lixouri, 25 minutes to walk but five minutes in a car. They comprise a general grocery and household goods store, a takeaway food shop, and a butcher who sells a range of meats. Most main shops, banks, medical services, and schools are to be found in Lixouri. An exception to this is a nearby store located immediately south of the village on the main road to Lixouri which is a large outdoor centre, stocking swimming, snorkeling, fishing and leisure equipment.

The local beach is very narrow and there are no facilities. Tourists are not common. It is a quiet area in which to walk and admire very open views over the bay. Cephalonia is renowned for having several world-class beaches (for example, Myrtos Beach, Xi Beach, Petani Beach and Vatsa Bay) which are accessible with a car. It is there that more tourists are found on the island.

== Economy and environment ==
As with many areas in Cephalonia, Agios Dimitrios was originally based on agriculture and a small contribution from fishing.

In recent years tourism has become an increasing priority within the economy of Cephalonia with investment from the EU under the Operational Programme 'Western Greece - Peloponnesus - Ionian Islands' Programme under the Convergence objective co-funded by the European Regional Development Fund (ERDF) for the period 2007-2013. The budget of the programme is around €1.14 billion. Within this framework are several priorities which include

- Priority 3: Infrastructure works & accessibility in Ionian Islands
- Priority 6: Digital convergence & entrepreneurship in Ionian Islands
- Priority 7: Sustainable development & quality of life in Western Greece

These high level strategic priorities are starting to have an effect and the evidence can be seen even in Agios Dimitrios. The number of buildings dedicated to tourist trade and tourist accommodation has increased with an increase in local development. There has been an increase in the number of non-Greek nationals becoming residents and developing properties within the village. There has also been a migration back to Cephalonia of Greek nationals (or family members) who had originally been displaced as a consequence the earthquake in the 1950s.

== Geology and Homer's Ithaca ==
Recent geological studies suggest that the Paliki Peninsula, in which Agios Dimitrios is sited, was originally a separate island. Known as the Paliki Hypothesis, it is now suggested that in the Bronze Age, a large earthquake caused a landslide to fill in a sea channel creating the bridge between the Paliki and the main island. One implication of this is that the Paliki Peninsula, and the area in which Agios Dimitrios is located is in fact the original location for Homer's Ithaca, the home of Odysseus, to which he journeyed after the Trojan War and written as the epic tale, Homer's The Odyssey.
