= Mantzavineika =

Mantzavineika or Mantzavinaiika (Greek: Μαντζαβινέικα or Μαντζαβιναίικα) is an old neighbourhood in the eastern part of the city of Patras northeast of the Roman Odeon of Patras. The origin of the name comes from the family of Patras "Mantzavini" (Μαντζαβίνη) which lived in Sotiradi and Pantokratoros Streets. The family descended from the village of Mantzavinata in which is now in the municipality of Lixouri in the Kefalonia prefecture.

== Note ==
- The first version of the article is translated and is based from the article at the Greek Wikipedia (el:Main Page)
