= Chavriata =

Chavriata Χαβριάτα
- Community
- Location within Greece
- Coordinates: 38°11′N 20°23′E
- Country: Greece
- Administrative region: Ionian Islands
- Regional unit: Kefalonia
- Municipality: Lixouri
- Municipal unit: Paliki

Population (2021)
  - Community: 223
- Time zone: UTC+2 (EET)
  - Summer (DST): UTC+3 (EEST)
- Postal code: 282 00
- Area code: 26710
- Vehicle registration: KE

Chavriata (Greek: Χαβριάτα) is a historical, hill-top village located 8 km outside of the town of Lixouri (Katogi Area) west-southwest in the Paliki municipal unit on the Greek Ionian island of Kefalonia.

It is known as the "Balcony of the Ionian" owing to the views it offers of both the fertile lowland and the sea.

== History ==
Because of its strategic location, Chavriata has been the target of hostile takeovers throughout its long history. In the controversial book Odysseus Unbound, Paliki was identified as the ancient location of Ithaca, the homeland of Odysseus.

During the two World Wars, hundreds of villagers gave their lives and the local resistance movements were very active. The village was severely destroyed during the 1953 Ionian earthquake. For decades, the village used to operate as the hub of agricultural production and animal farming for the entire peninsula providing employment opportunities to thousands of people that would come to work in the local farms from very far away.

== Vikentios Damodos ==
The renowned 18th-century Greek philosopher Vikentios (Vincenzo) Damodos (1700–1752), son of a local aristocrat (Francesco Damodon), was born in the village and inaugurated a Philosophical and Theological School there upon its return from abroad. Under the conditions prevailing in the Stato da Màr (Kefalonia was part of the Venetian Republic from 1500 to 1797) all higher education had to be undertaken abroad. Damodos studied law in the Flaginian School in Venice and philosophy in the Collegio Veneto in Padova. Returning to his native village, he worked as a lawyer and he taught philosophy, rhetoric, and Greek literature for 32 years. He is considered one of the most influential Greek Renassainance figures and one of the prominent intellectuals and teachers of the period. He is the author of more than 140 works.

His considerable output of work on logic, rhetoric, physics, metaphysics, ethics and theology, printed in Athens as recently as 1940 and represented here. This work is still on traditional lines. That is to say, it relies, in its discussion of the nature, the subject-matter and the parts of moral philosophy, mainly on Aristotelian terms and concepts: the discussion of the summum bonum is, from this point of view, a relatively minor difference. For all that, and didactic though it is, the work stands on its own feet. It is reasoned, it pays careful attention to definition (for example, of various senses of 'good ' and of ' end '), it has something of its own to say about common sense as a kind of moral sense, and it hangs together. A section on the passions of the soul is obviously Cartesian in inspiration. Damodos's style is a pellucid, simple Greek, in strong contrast to the artificiality and archaism of Mavrokordatos, and the tortuosity of the third representative of this period, Eugenios Voulgaris.

Damodos was among the first Greek intellectuals that questioned the absolute power of men and priests in the local society and, contrary to the established practice, made use of a simplified idiom (predecessor to the modern Greek language-Dimotiki) in order to deliver his lectures to the local population in a much more effective and direct manner.

Imbued with the new ideas of the Western Enlightenment, he produced the first Greek handbook of dogmatic theology. This was an innovation in the Orthodox world, where previously, although “Confessions of Faith” had been produced on the Western model in response to pressure from the West, there had not been any attempt at a systematic exposition of doctrine on rational principles. Damodos's model was the Jesuit Denis Pétau's De theologicis dogmatibus. While declaring his desire to follow “the God-bearing Fathers, and be guided by them” (Yannaras 2006, 101), Damodos reflects Western intellectualism rather than a patristic outlook. Damodos's Dogmatics only circulated in manuscript but it set the precedent for later works of the same kind by Eugenios Voulgaris and others, right up to the authoritative manuals of Christos Androutsos (1907) and Panayiotis Trembelas (1959–1963).

One of the remotely controlled telescopes operated by the National Observatory for Education 'EUDOXOS' has taken the name 'Vikendios Damodos' (TVD) and it is a specially made Ritchey-Cretien 0.51m equatorial reflector. EUDOXOS is the oldest Greek center for Robotic Astronomy and the Official Observatory of the Secondary Education System of Greece and operates since 1999 at an altitude of 1040m on Mount Ainos in Kefallonia. In the relevant announcement in November 2007, the following was stated:

TVD honors the Cephalonian Humanitarian Vikendios Damodos from Havriata Pallis Kefalonia who created one of the earliest and most famous Greek original schools of Philosophy, Orthodox Theology and Physical Sciences of the 18th century, in his village in Kefalonia. As many Cephalonians did during the Venetian rule of the island, V. Damodos studied in the Universita di Padova and before his return he lectured in the Hellenic educational establishment of Venice.

== Population ==
Year	Population
1981	304
1991	239
2001	309
2011	220
2021	223

The majority of the population is farmers, producing olives, grapes (stafida) and vegetables in the fertile fields, numerous vineyards, fruit orchards and olive groves, surrounding the village. The wine produced in the area is of a rare Robola quality due to the fertile green valley of moshato grape vineyards located next to the village. The flat lands along with hills cover the area around Chavriata while the mountains dominate the northern part. Part of the area around the village is also characterised by strange alluvial outpourings of sandy, grey soil. These scrubby wastelands have little or no cultivation on them.

The village is generally renowned for its special intellect and several academics originate from there. Its inhabitants are people with a keen sense of humor, a great deal of creativity, and a long musical tradition. The local population speaks a particular idiom that uses a wide variety of terms of Italian origin.

An impressive point about the village is that almost 90% of its inhabitants carry the same surname (Moschopoulos).

The village has experienced severe emigration, particularly to Canada and to the United States.

== Nearest places ==
The nearest places are ordered clockwise

- Chavdata, north west
- Vouni, east
- Monastery of Kipoureon (west)

== Moni Kipoureon ==
About 1 km further on the road forks, one can find the impressive Holy Moni Kipoureon (Kipouria) which offers a scenic view of the Ionian Sea, especially during the sunset. The landscape of the Monastery is reminiscent of the "Caroulia" of Mount Athos. This in combination with its spiritual treasures makes the Monastery an attraction for visitors.

Its location is on a precipitous bluff that juts out over the deep blue sea (700m over the sea). The last and only monk, father Eusevios, that still lives there welcomes its visitors offering them local specialities. He has rebuilt most of the monastery buildings by himself, from the early 1990s.

The Monastery was built in the 17th century on the edge of a vertical solid rocky cliff high above the sea and owes its name to the numerous gardens in the area (kipos-garden). The founder of the Monastery was the Paxian Monk Chrisanthos Petropoulos and it is dedicated to the Annunciation of the Virgin. In a short period of time, it became a monk Monastery with the monk population reaching 80 in its peak years. Many distinguished clergymen emerged from this Monastery. Local earthquakes destroyed the monastery several times. In 1915 a French cruiser bombed the Monastery, mistaking its smoking chimney for an enemy vessel.

Within the Monastery one can worship the miraculous icon of the Annunciation as well as the sculls of the founders of the Monastery, Chrisanthos, Konstantios and Efronios. A piece of the Holy Cross offered to the Monastery by the Russian Prince Vladimiros Dolgoroukis in 1862 is also kept in the Monastery. An elegant glass jar holds St Dimitrios' Myrovlitos holy myron from the 7th AC century.

One can also worship various Saint's relics as well as saint Paraskevi's miraculous icon, a unique treasure of the destroyed Tafios Monastery. Holy relics, rare post-Renassaince, post-Byzantive and Italian-Cretan icons and items of faith can be found in the church which was built within the monastery area.

== Gerogompos Lighthouse ==
At a crossing after the village of Havriata, at the most western part of Greece, one can find a historical lighthouse of international value. It is located southwest of the village which is near Cape Gerogompos.

It was manufactured in 1907 by British engineers and played an important role especially during the Second World War. It was destroyed by the German troops at their retirement from the island and was rebuilt in 1947. The altitude of the tower is 13 metres and it has a 58-metre radius of light. It used to belong to the Greek Navy and access to its premises used to be prohibited but nowadays it operates automatically.

== See also ==
- List of settlements in Cephalonia
