= Skineas =

Human settlement in Greece

Skineas Σκινέας
- Community
- Location within Greece
- Coordinates: 38°14′31″N 20°23′31″E
- Country: Greece
- Administrative region: Ionian Islands
- Regional unit: Cephalonia
- Municipality: Lixouri
- Municipal unit: Paliki

Population (2021)
  - Community: 146
- Time zone: UTC+2 (EET)
  - Summer (DST): UTC+3 (EEST)

Skineas (Greek: Σκινέας) is a village and a community on the Paliki peninsula of Cephalonia, Greece. It is 6 km northwest of Lixouri. The community consists of the villages Skineas and Vlychata.
