= Lepeda Beach =

Beach in Greece

Coordinates: 38.1786°N 20.4399°E

Lepeda Beach is a beach in the south east of the Paliki, in Kefalonia, Greece. The beach is about 2 km (1.2 mi) south of Lixouri.

== Character ==
The beach is at the end of a length of coast road. A steep curved ramp leads down to an open bay with a strip of orange-red sandy beach, which is up to 10 metres (33 ft) wide in places. The beach is about 150 m (490 ft) long, with ample access for swimming, along with having sets of distinctive rocks near shore margin towards the north end of the beach.

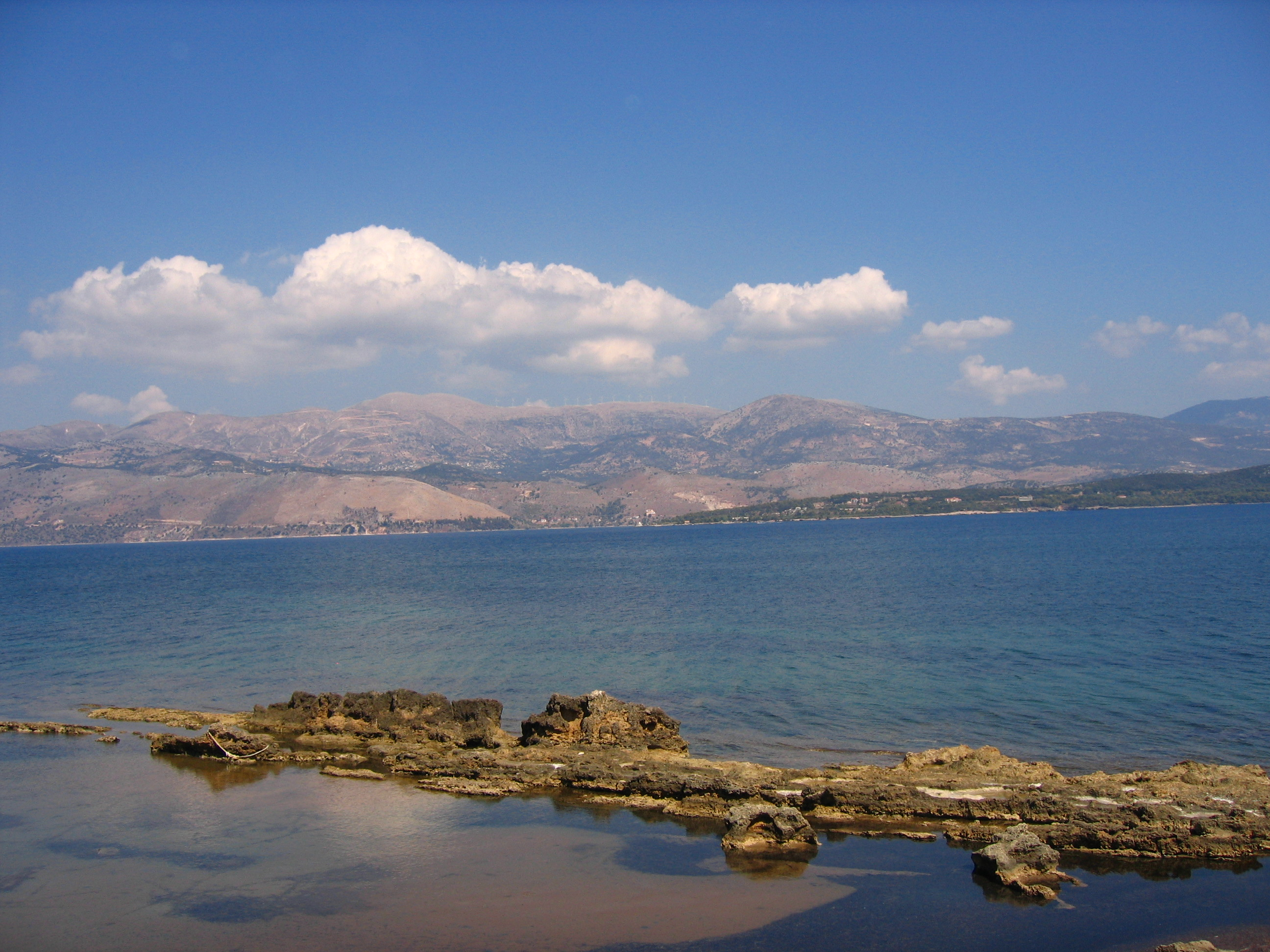
Lepeda beach at noon

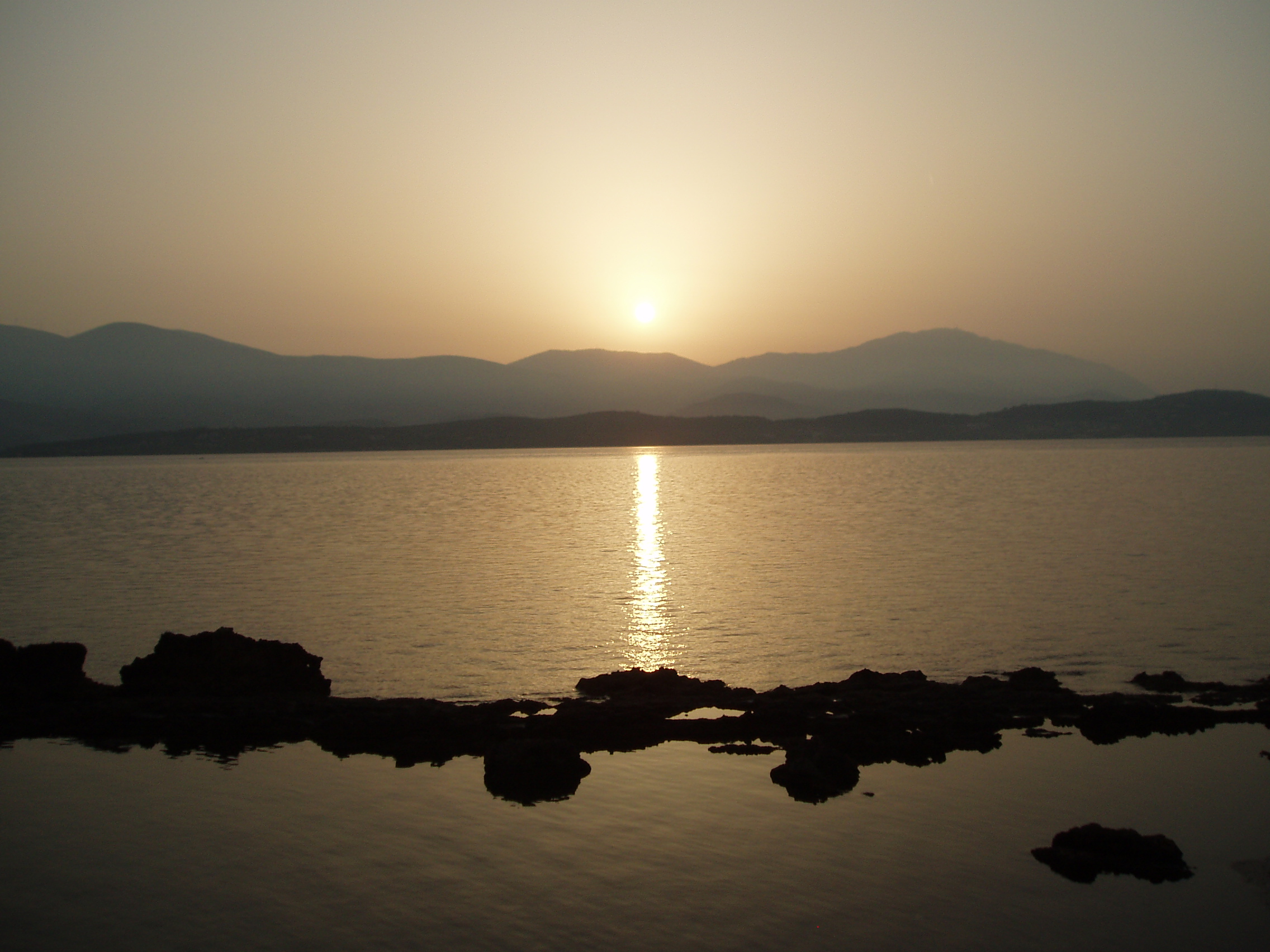
Lepeda beach at sunrise

== Geology ==
The adjacent area is composed of local limestone with a brushwood cover. Homes with beach front access dot the area.

== Travel and amenities ==
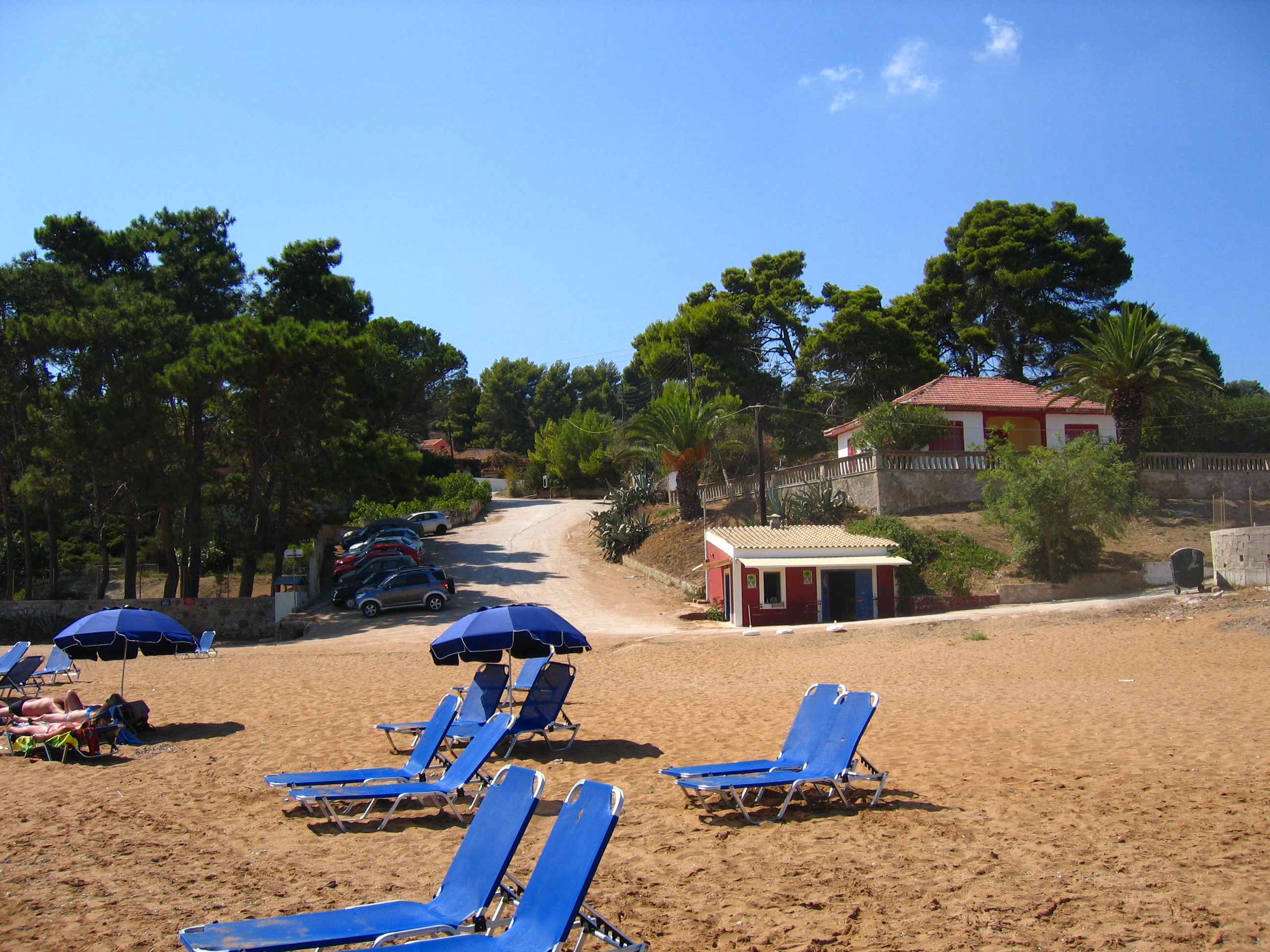
The small beach shop

A short, steep, well-made road leads down to the beach area. The beach has a single small shop selling drinks. It is possible to hire a sunshade. A volleyball net is often in place. Many people try and park on the steep road, however, going right to the bottom of the incline and turning left immediately in front of the small shop leads down a road to a larger car park area.
