= Petani Beach =

Beach in Kefalonia, Greece

Coordinates: 38.2617°N 20.3772°E

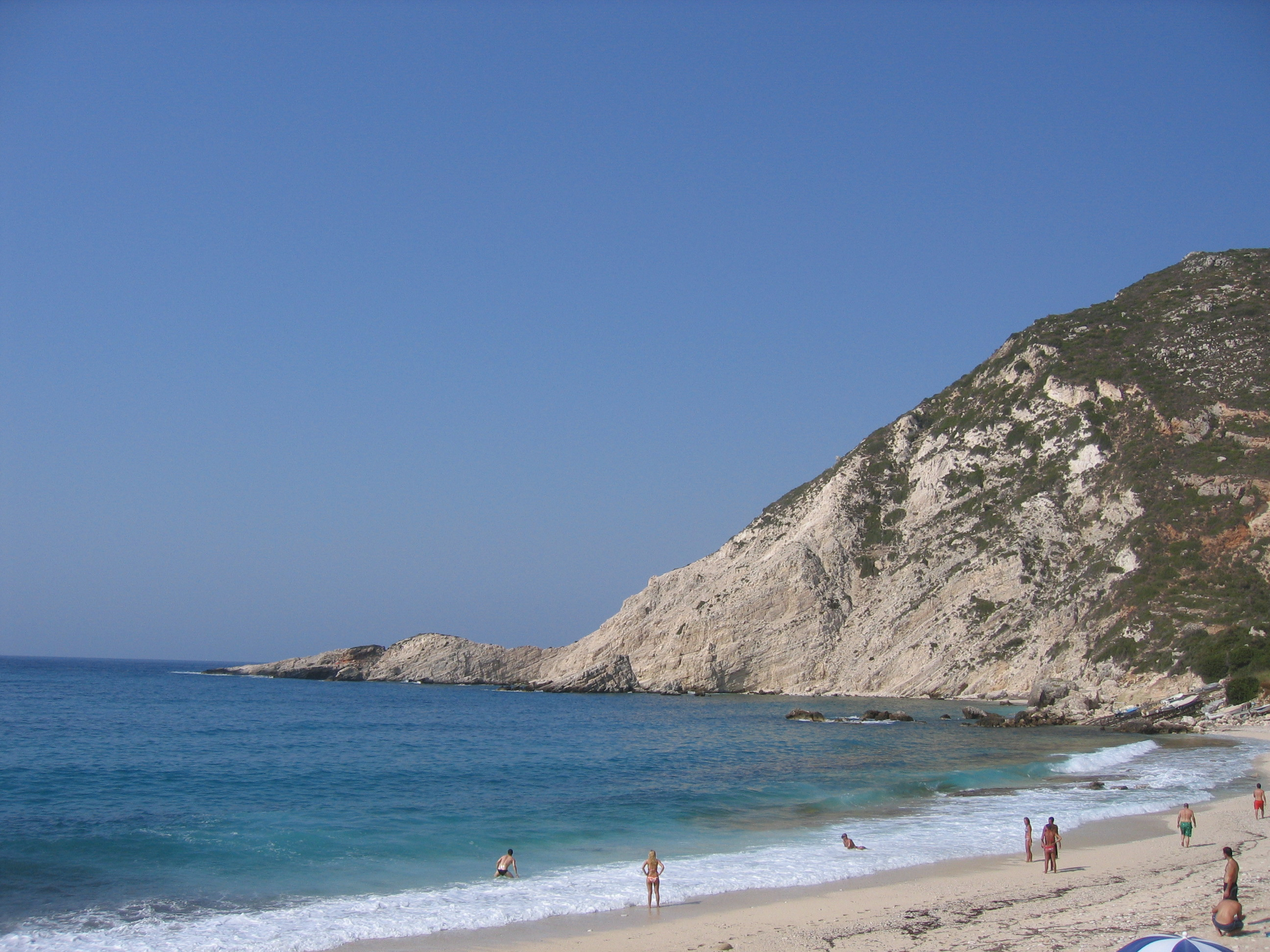
Petani Beach with its white sand, backed by white limestone cliffs

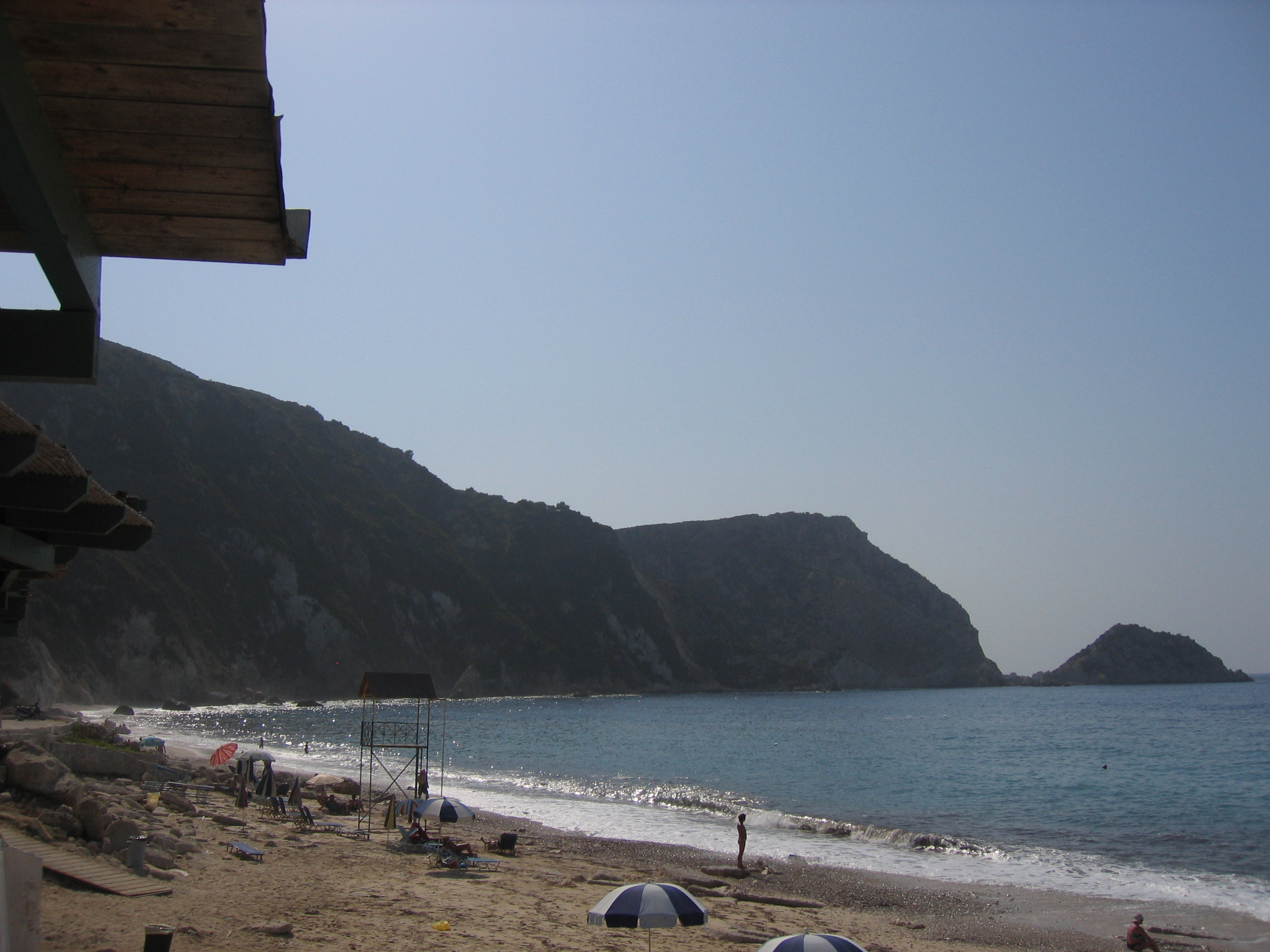
Petani beach, looking to its Southern aspect

Petani Beach (also spelled Petanoi) is situated in the North West of the Paliki, in Kefalonia, Greece. The nearest large town is Lixouri.

== Character ==
The beach is set at the base of a very steep road, surrounded by mountains, in a curved bay with a strip of pebble and sand beach which is up to 50M wide in places. The beach is about 600M long, with the central part being used by swimmers.

Petani beach is recognised for its great beauty, with many visitors comparing it with a smaller version of Myrtos Beach. It is a blue-flag beach. A favoured activity is evening swimming before watching changing colours on the sea as the sun sets in the West.

The beach slopes quickly away so that one can only go out a short distance from the shoreline before being out of depth.

== Geology ==
The steep surrounding hillsides at Petani Beach are made up of local limestone covered by brush undergrowth.

== Travel and Amenities ==
A steep, winding, hairpin-bend but well-made road leads down to the beach area. There is no public transport to the beach.

At the end of the road, car parking is located on-road or in two small car parks linked with specific tavernas. This can be crowded at the height of the tourist season. A pay car park is also available.

The beach has two large tavernas, each of which provides a range of full meals as well as drinks and snacks.
