= John R. Underhill =

Scottish football referee

John R. Underhill (born 5 January 1961) is Professor of Stratigraphy and Director of the Centre for Energy Transition at Aberdeen University, Scotland. He was a football referee in the Scottish Premier League, until mandatory age retiral in 2008 and was on the FIFA panel of referees.

== Career ==
=== Geology ===
He gained his first degree in geology at Bristol University in 1982. He was awarded a PhD from the University of Wales, Cardiff in 1985; the subject of his thesis being 'Neogene and Quaternary Tectonics and Sedimentation in Western Greece'. He worked for Shell in The Hague and London as an exploration geoscientist. He was appointed as lecturer in the Grant Institute of Geology (as it was then) in 1989 before becoming Professor of Stratigraphy in 1998. His main area of geological research is understanding how the Sedimentary Basins form and evolve through the use of seismic interpretation methods. One area of his interdisciplinary geo-research that has received recent acclaim has been an assessment of the geological, geomorphological and geophysical evidence for relocating Odysseus' Homeland, Ancient Ithaca. Underhill was elected to be Vice-President Elect of the European Association of Geoscientists & Engineers (EAGE) in 2009, an organisation that he led as their President in 2011-12. In 2012, he was awarded the Geological Society's Petroleum Group Silver Medal and the Edinburgh Geological Society's Clough Medal.

In 2017 he stated that, unlike the United States, large scale fracking in the UK was unlikely to be economical due to the fractured geology of the island, and a lack of trapped gas within shale deposits.

=== Football ===
Underhill began refereeing while at Bristol University after taking up running to recuperate from an ankle injury. He subsequently refereed in the Welsh Leagues, whilst undertaking his PhD in Cardiff (1982–85), in Dutch Football (during 1986) before returning to England and officiating in the Southern League and Football Combination (1986–89). Underhill moved to Edinburgh in 1989 and refereed in local leagues until being promoted to the Scottish Football Association's Senior List of Referees in 1991.

He refereed the Junior Cup Final between Largs and Glenafton at Ibrox in 1994 and was then elevated to become a Grade One Referee at the start of the 1994-95 season. He officiated his first SPL match (between Raith Rovers and Motherwell) at the start of the 1995-96 season and remained a top flight official in Scotland and Europe from 1994 until reaching the retirement age for officials in Scotland at the end of the 2007-08 season. His last SPL games were Gretna v Hearts and Motherwell v Rangers in May 2008.

He was the first Englishman to represent Scotland on the FIFA International List of referees officiating at 40 international matches between 1994 and 2006. Underhill served as a fourth official in 2002 World Cup qualifying, and refereed in eight matches recognized by UEFA. He was elected by his peers to be the inaugural chairman of the Scottish Senior Football Referees' Association (SSFRA), a position that he held from 2005 until his age-enforced refereeing retiral 2008.

Since retiring from the SPL, Underhill has retained an interest in refereeing through Masters Football, a televised indoor 6-a-side tournament which is played throughout the UK each summer and internationally in Dubai, Vietnam and Kuala Lumpur. In 2009, he was one of the first referees to use video technology on live (Sky) TV to correctly disallow a goal and award a penalty for the opposition in the Masters Football Grand Final in the Liverpool Arena.

== Awards ==
- 1992 Received the President's award of the Geological Society of London
- 1992 Received the Matson Award from the AAPG for excellence in presentation
- 1999 He was an AAPG Distinguished Lecturer
- 2000 Awarded the Wollaston Fund of the Geological Society of London
- 2004 Elected as a fellow of the Royal Society of Edinburgh
- 2012 Awarded the Geological Society's [Petroleum Group Silver Medal]
- 2012 Awarded the Edinburgh Geological Society's [Clough Medal].
- 2016 Awarded the Lyell Medal of the Geological Society of London

== See also ==
Odysseus Unbound

Nominative determinism
