= Mantzavinata =

Mantzavinata Μαντζαβινάτα
- Settlement
- Location within Greece
- Coordinates: 38°10.7′N 20°24.5′E
- Country: Greece
- Administrative region: Ionian Islands
- Regional unit: Kefalonia
- Municipality: Lixouri
- Municipal unit: Paliki
- Community: Katogi
- Elevation: 80 m (260 ft)

Population (2021)
  - Total: 217
- Time zone: UTC+2 (EET)
  - Summer (DST): UTC+3 (EEST)
- Vehicle registration: KE

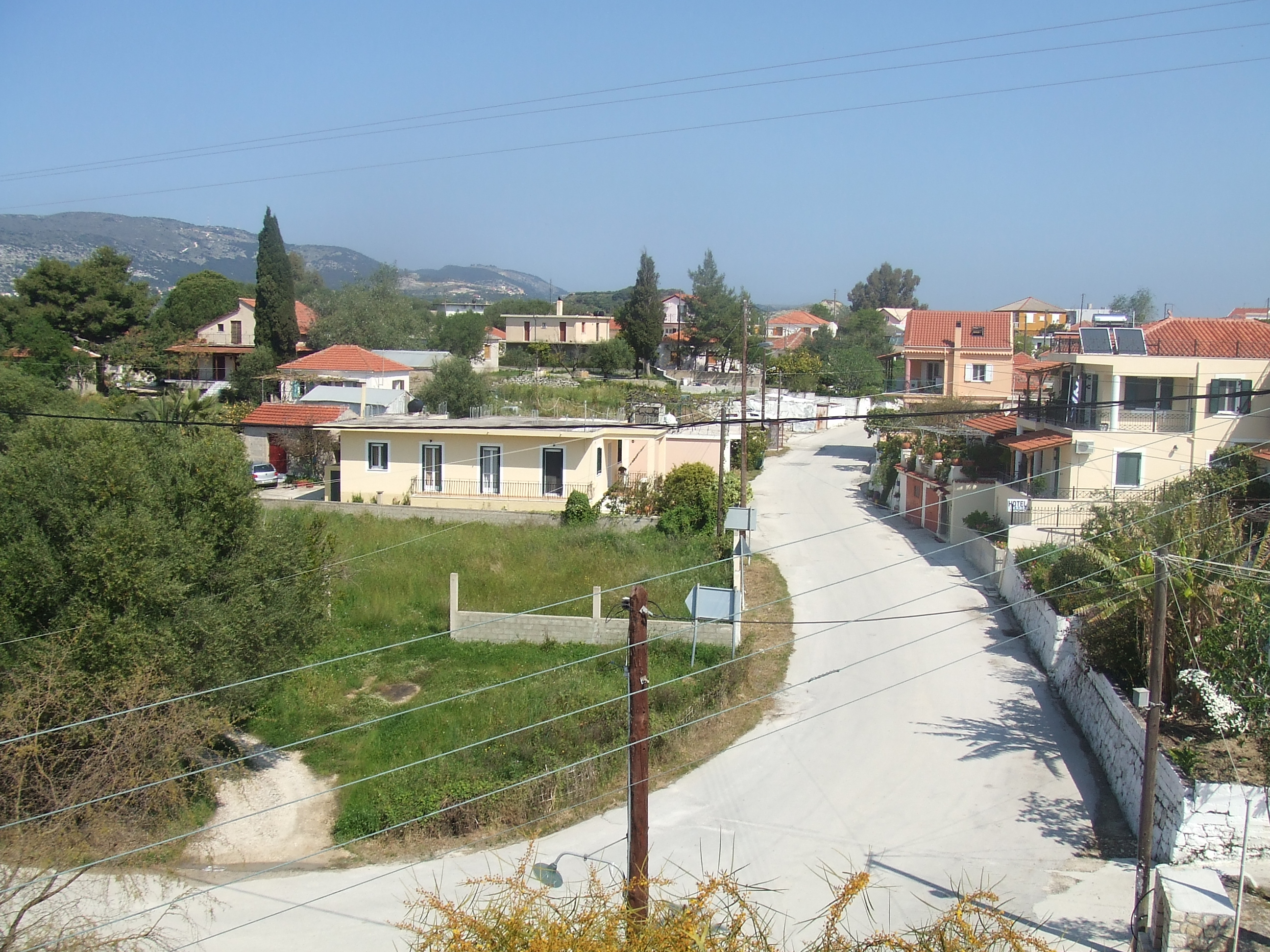
Mantzavinata from Hagia Sophia church

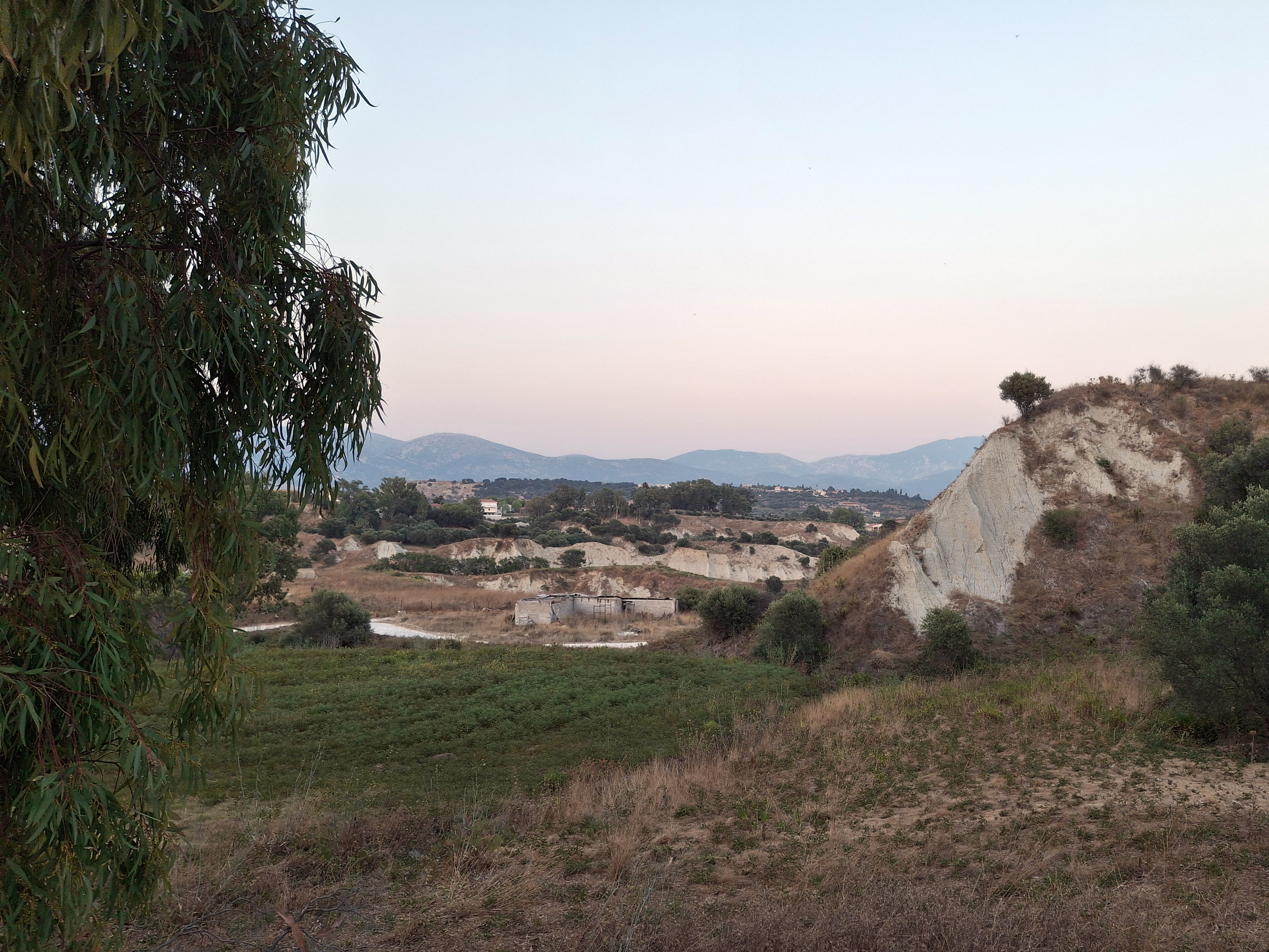
Hills of blue clay in Mantzavinata

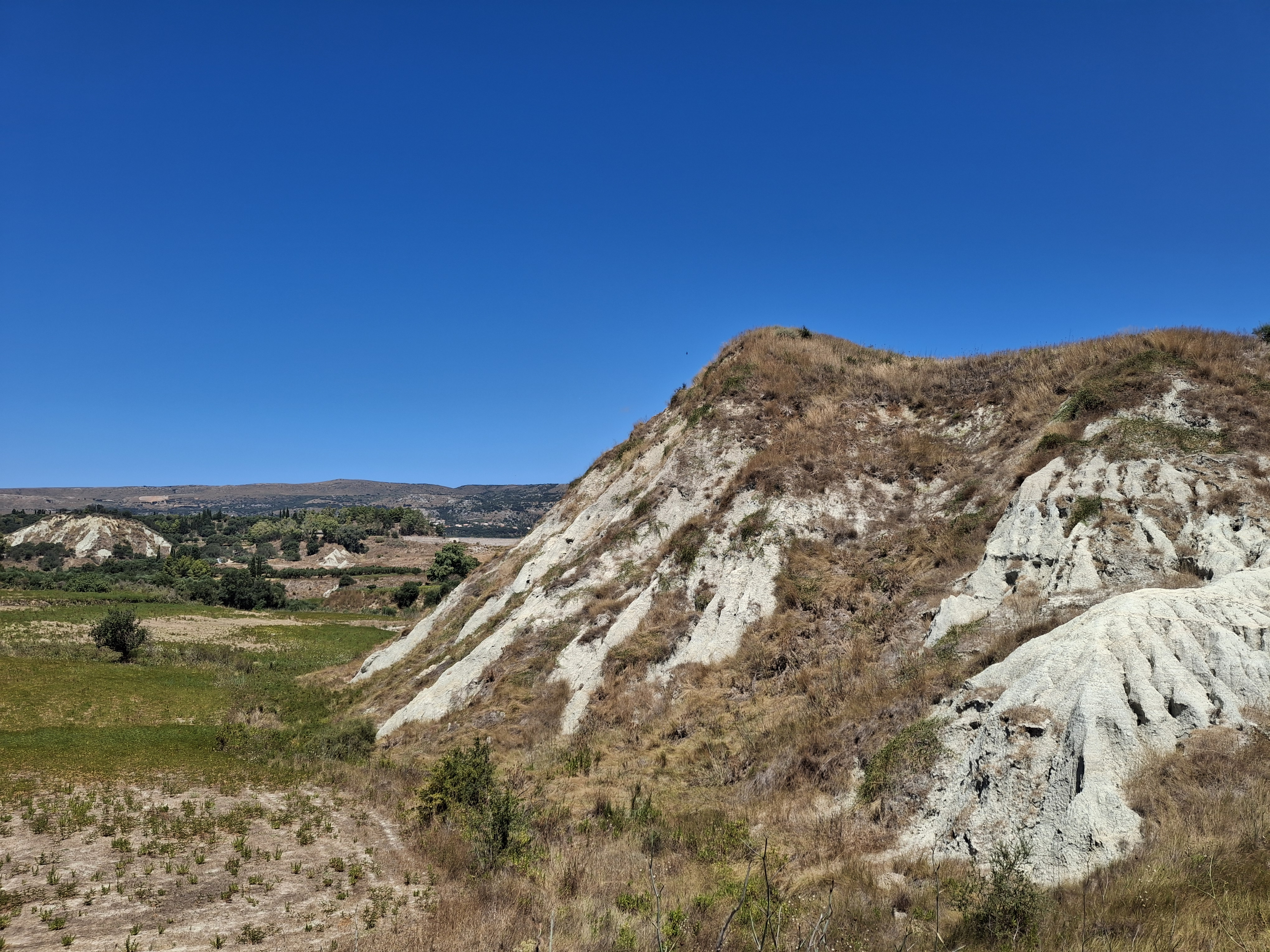
Hills of blue clay south of Mantzavinata during summer

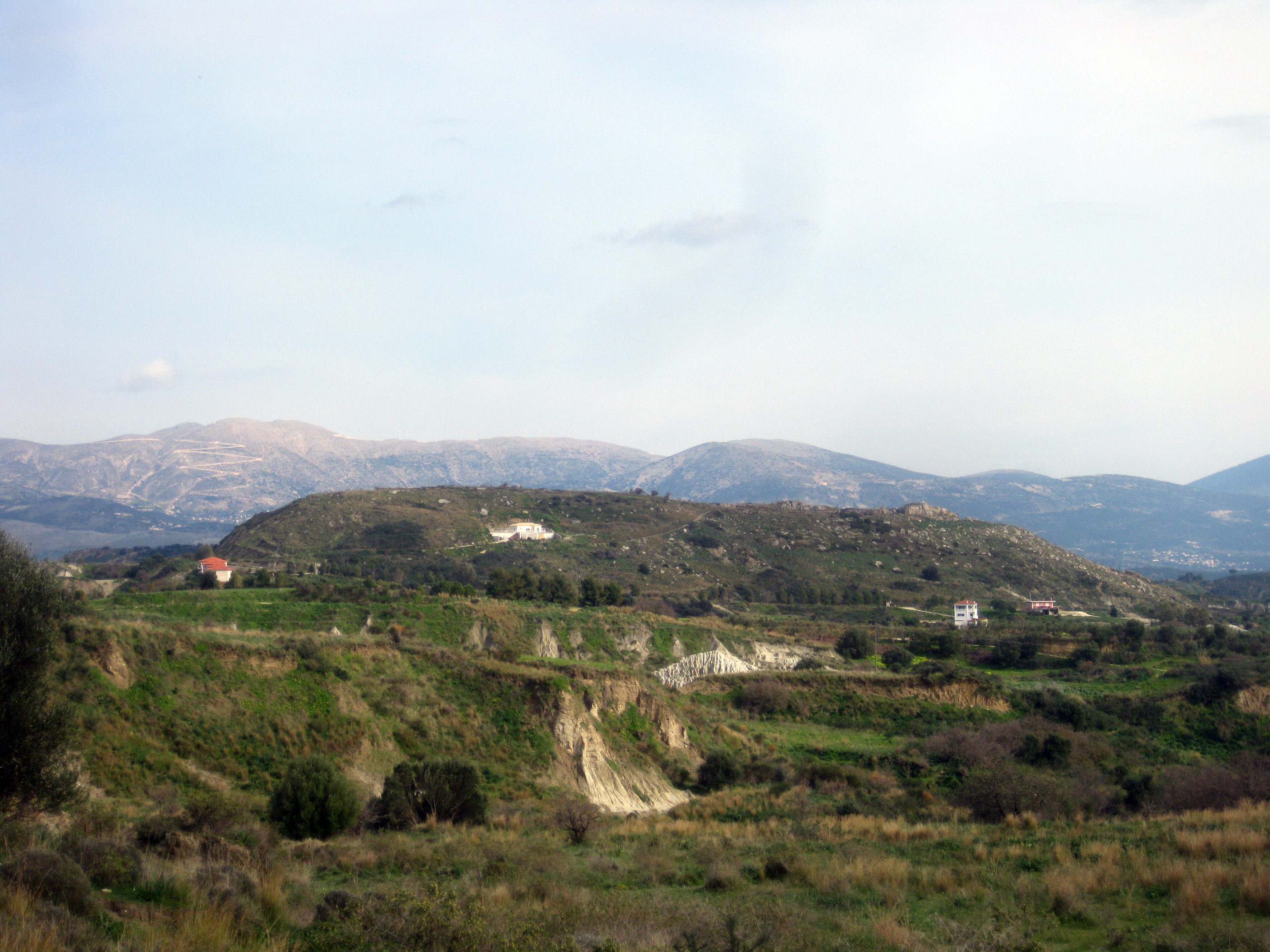
The Maspali hill during winter

Mantzavinata (Greek: Μαντζαβινάτα Italian: Mangiavinata ) is a village in the southwest of Kefalonia island, 4 km southwest of Lixouri on the Paliki peninsula. Mantzavinata is famous for its wines, a wine festival is held each August in Mantzavinata.

== Geography ==
Mantzavinata is surrounded by blue clay hills, many covered with groves. This landscape is declared geosite nr.2 of the Geopark Kefalonia Ithaka, other nearby Geoparks as part of the village are Xi (nr. 3) and Kounopetra (nr. 4).

Farming and agriculture are the main industry in Mantzavinata, although due to the nearby beaches, tourism also plays a significant part in the economy. Together with the smaller village Vouni and the islet of Vardianoi, it forms the community of Katogi.

== History ==
The Maspali hill was perhaps an ancient acropolis. At Vazza, a Roman mosaic was found and is displayed today at the Archaeological Museum of Kefalonia. Two of the three churches are original structures from the 17th century.

Until the 1940s, Mantzavinata was an important centre of wine and raisin production. World War II, and the complete destruction of the village in the 1953 Ionian earthquake increased emigration. It took until the mid-1950s to rebuild the village. The central square was called Lemonata.

The former farmland around Mantzavinata is popular for house building. Today many families built also their new homes outside of the center near the beaches Xi and Mania. This new settlement is also known as Kounopetra.

=== Art theft (1988) ===
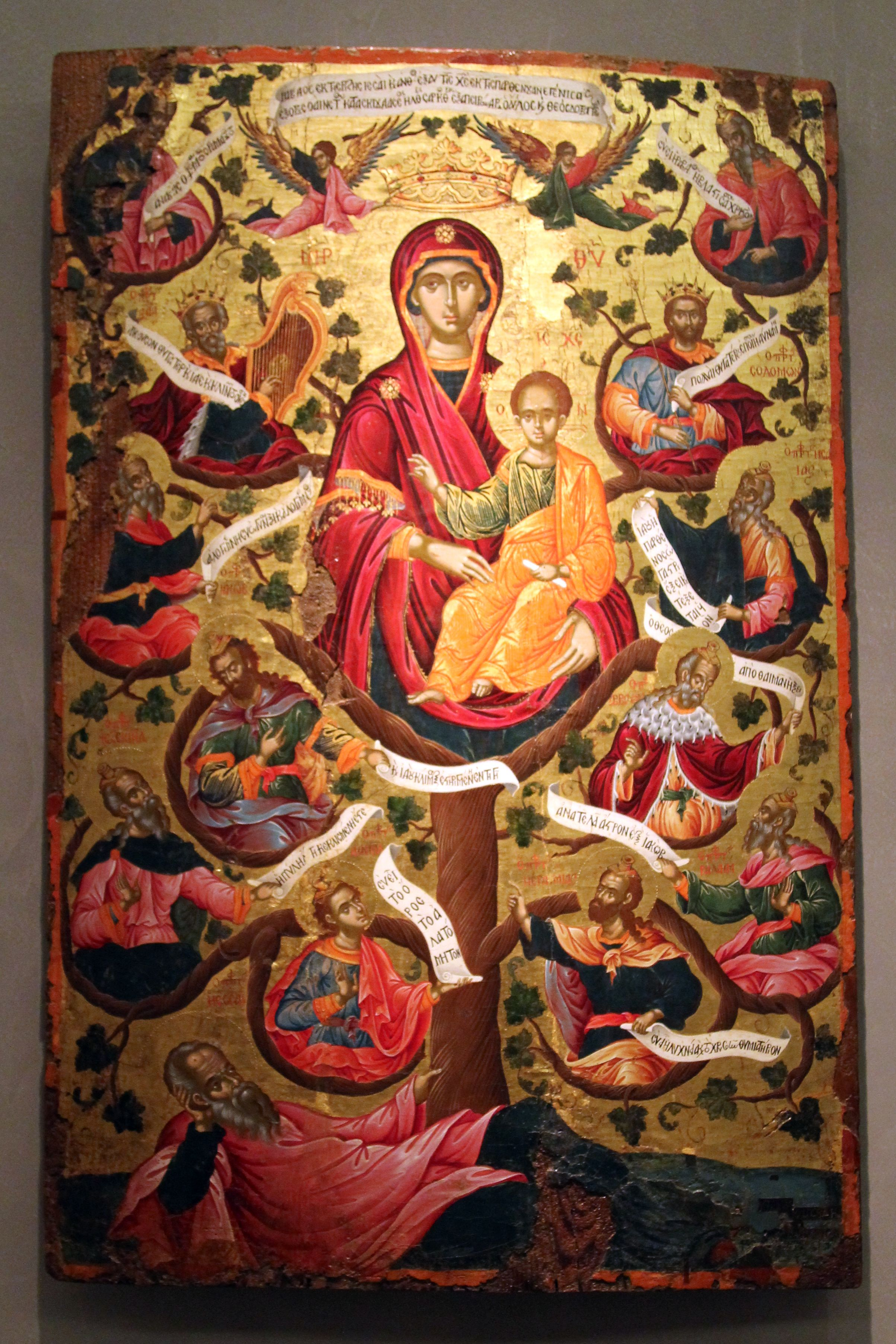
Virgin as the Root of Jesse. One of the icons stolen in the 1988 art theft and still awaiting its return from the safekeeping

In connection with the Church of Panaghia in Mantzavinata, several important icons by the Cretan-Ionian painter Theodoros Poulakis (Θεόδωρος Πουλάκης) were recovered after having been stolen from the Church of the Dormition of the Theotokos (Koimesis tis Theotokou). Six icons and two printed Gospel books were seized and transferred to the Byzantine and Christian Museum in Athens for safekeeping. Of particular significance are four large icons, dated 1666, which originally formed part of the church's iconostasis. They depict the Dormition of the Theotokos, Christ the Vine, the Virgin as the Root of Jesse, and John the Baptist with scenes from his life. The icons were recovered in severely damaged condition; the icon of the Dormition was even found concealed in a ditch. They subsequently underwent conservation and restoration at the Byzantine and Christian Museum in Athens. Another icon by Poulakis from the church in Mantzavinata, depicting the Beheading of John the Baptist, was also restored. Despite their recovery, the icons have not been returned to the church in Mantzavinata and remain in state custody.

=== Name ===
The name 'Mantzavinata' comes from the Italian words mangiare (eat) and vino (wine), -ata is the typical ending for places in Kefalonia. Mantzavinata had several persons with the surname Mantzavinos/Mantzavinatos, one of whom founded a subdivision in Patras known as Mantzavineika. Another founded the Mantzavinateio Hospital in Lixouri. A famous winery was called Mantzavino.

== Population ==
Historical population
| Year | Pop. | ±% |
|---|---|---|
| 1981 | 309 | — |
| 1991 | 152 | −50.8% |
| 2001 | 220 | +44.7% |
| 2011 | 220 | +0.0% |
| 2021 | 217 | −1.4% |

== See also ==
- List of settlements in Cephalonia
