= Giovanni Francesco Zulatti =

Physician born in Cephalonia

Giovanni Francesco Zulatti (1762 – December 1805) was a physician born in Lixouri, Cephalonia (then a possession of the Republic of Venice, now part of Greece). In 1796, he was appointed governor of Ithaca. During the period of French rule in the Ionian Islands from 1797, he was made the chief physician of the military hospital in Corfu.

== Selected works ==
- Della forza della Musica nelle passioni, nei costumi e dell' uso medico del Ballo (Venice, 1787).
