= Odysseus Unbound =

2005 book by Robert Bittlestone

Odysseus Unbound: The Search for Homer's Ithaca
- Author: Robbert Bittlestone
- Language: English
- Genre: Non-fiction
- Publication date: 2005

Odysseus Unbound: The Search for Homer's Ithaca is a 2005 book by Robert Bittlestone, with appendices by the philologist James Diggle and the geologist John Underhill. The book investigates the location of Homer's Ithaca, arguing that Paliki, a peninsula of Kefalonia, was an island at the time of the Trojan War, and that it was the island referred to as Ithaca in the Odyssey.

The accuracy of Homer's geography has been disputed since antiquity, and Bittlestone's book is one of several published by non-academic authors in the 1990s and 2000s that attempts to identify Homer's Ithaca based on the geographical evidence given in the Odyssey. Bittlestone's argument that Paliki should be identified with Homer's Ithaca has received favourable reviews, with Mary Beard considering that there is "a very fair chance indeed" that he is correct, and Peter Green calling it "almost certainly correct".

Paliki, Kefalonia (Cephalonia) & Ithaki (the traditional Ithaca): click map to show scale — Homer said Ithaca was "low-lying"

However, reviewers criticised the hyperbolic claims made for the book. G. L. Huxley and Christina Haywood both criticised Odysseus Unbound for not taking the argument that Homer's Ithaca was the same island as modern Ithaca seriously enough, and Huxley argues that even if Bittlestone's case that Paliki was once a separate island from Kefalonia is accepted, the book does not prove that it is the location of Homer's Ithaca. Haywood concludes that Bittlestone "was carried too far by his enthusiasm", while Beard, though convinced by the argument that Paliki was an island in the Mycenaean period, concludes that "the end of the book descends into fantasy", and criticises Bittlestone for his excessive concern with speculatively identifying every geographical feature of Ithaca mentioned in the Odyssey with a real location on Paliki.

== Works cited ==
- Beard, Mary (7 October 2005). "Cephalonia, alas". TLS. Archived from the original on 29 September 2006.
- Green, Peter (30 November 2006). "Finding Ithaca". New York Review of Books.
- Haywood, Christina (2007). "Review: Odysseus Unbound: The Search for Homer's Ithaca by R. Brittlestone, James Diggle and John Underhill". Classics Ireland. 14. JSTOR 25528473.
- Huxley, G. L. (2007). "Review: Odysseus Unbound: The search for Homer's Ithaca by Robert Bittlestone, James Diggle and John Underhill". Hermathena. 182. JSTOR 23041723.
- van Wijngaarden, Gert Jan (2011). "Immaterial Landscapes: Homeric Geography and the Ionian Islands". Quaternary International. 30.
