= Vatsa Bay =

Bay on the southern tip of Paliki peninsula of Kefalonia, Greece

Coordinates: 38°9.9′N 20°22.6′E

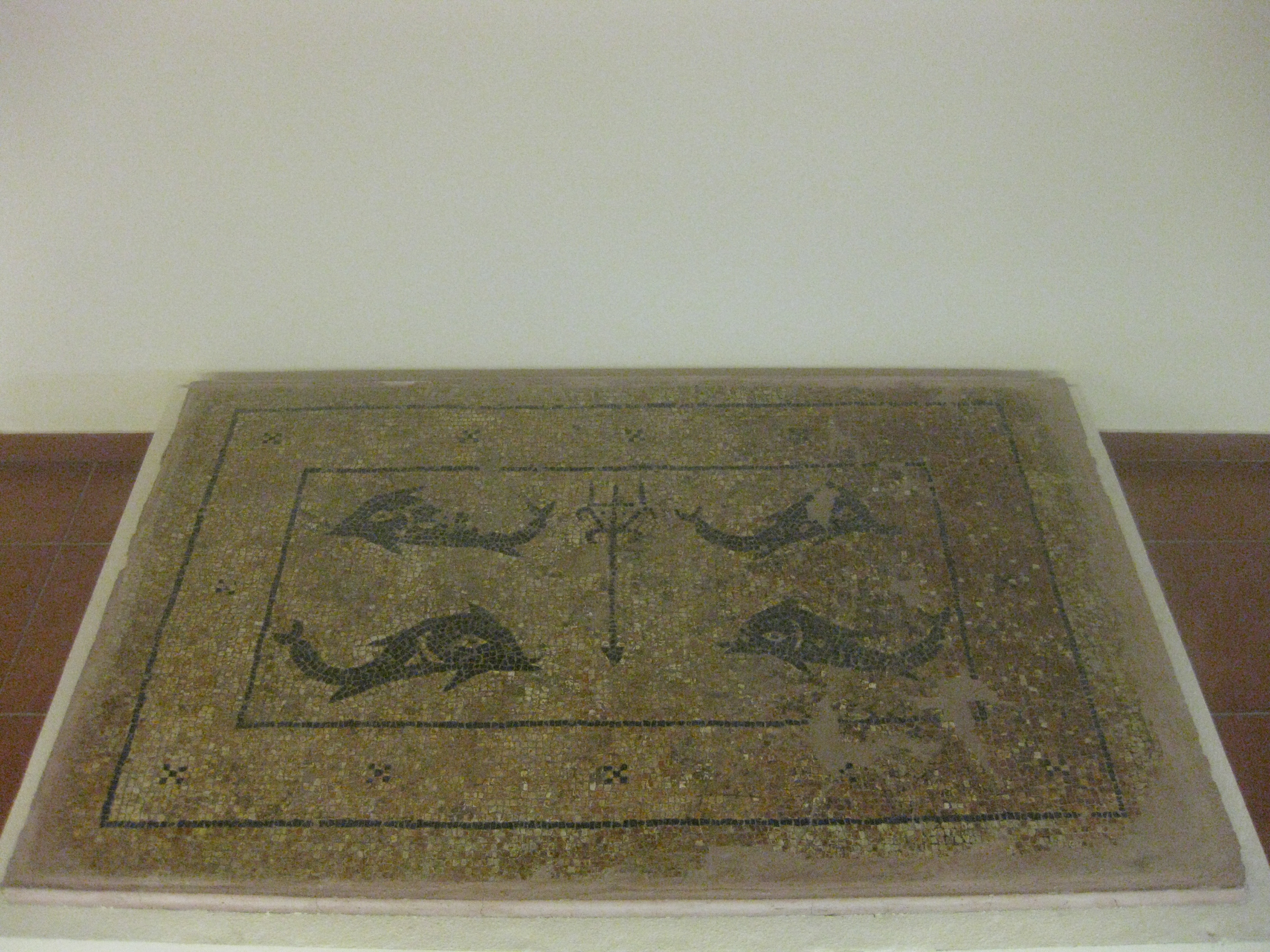
The Poseidon Mosaic from Vatsa in the archaeological museum

The Beach

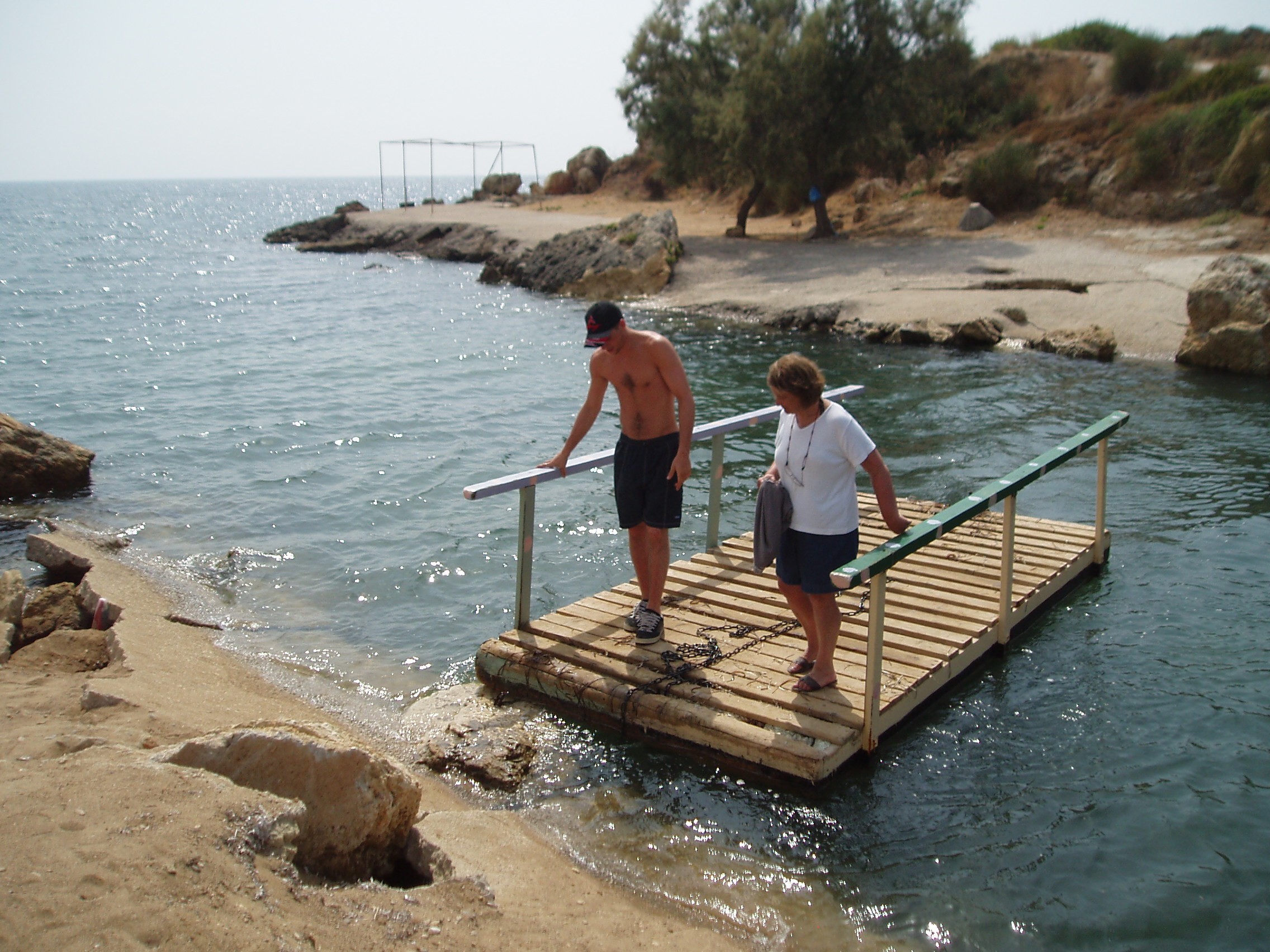
The River and boat crossing

Vatsa Bay (Vazza) is a bay on the southern tip of Paliki peninsula of Kefalonia, Greece. The area lies far from the main towns and villages in Kefalonia and preserves a rural charm for visitors. There is no public transport, and as a result, access has to be by car.

== History ==
The Bay of Vatsa was settled in Roman times. A mosaic with a trident and dolphins from a Roman villa is displayed at the Archeological Museum of Kefalonia. The Venetians used the bay as a shipyard.

== Geography and economy ==
The area has few buildings. There are light agricultural activities, including covered growing houses. Fishing from small boats operates in the locality.

There is a tourist beach area. The beach is approximately six metres wide and composed of red/yellow soft sand in which are embedded scattered pebbles.

A small river reaches the sea at this point on the coast (one of the two on Kepfalonia) and can be crossed by a chain-anchored boat.

== Amenities ==
The beach has a taverna (Spiaggia Taverna) immediately on the shore adjacent to the river. The Taverna has a thatched roof and the floor is of beach sand. Boats can be hired for fishing or exploring the coves and hidden beaches of the area.

There are some local apartments that can be rented as tourist accommodation.

A small chapel dedicated to Saint Nikolaos (open to visitors) is located nearby. This site is also the location of a previous ancient Temple remains.
