= Xi Beach =

Beach in the south of the Paliki peninsula of Kefalonia, Greece

Coordinates: 38.16086°N 20.41307°E

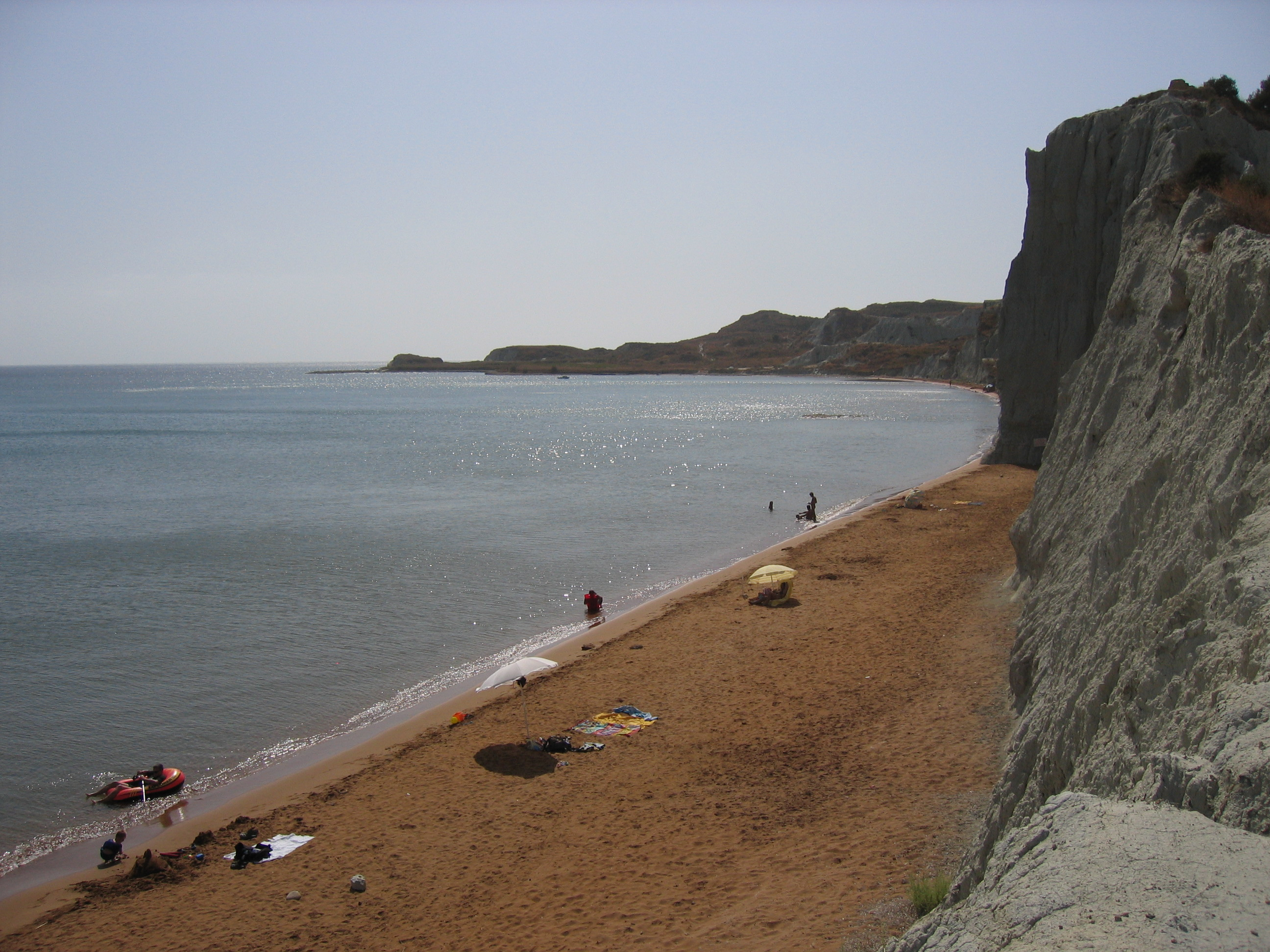
Xi Beach with its red sand, backed by white cliffs

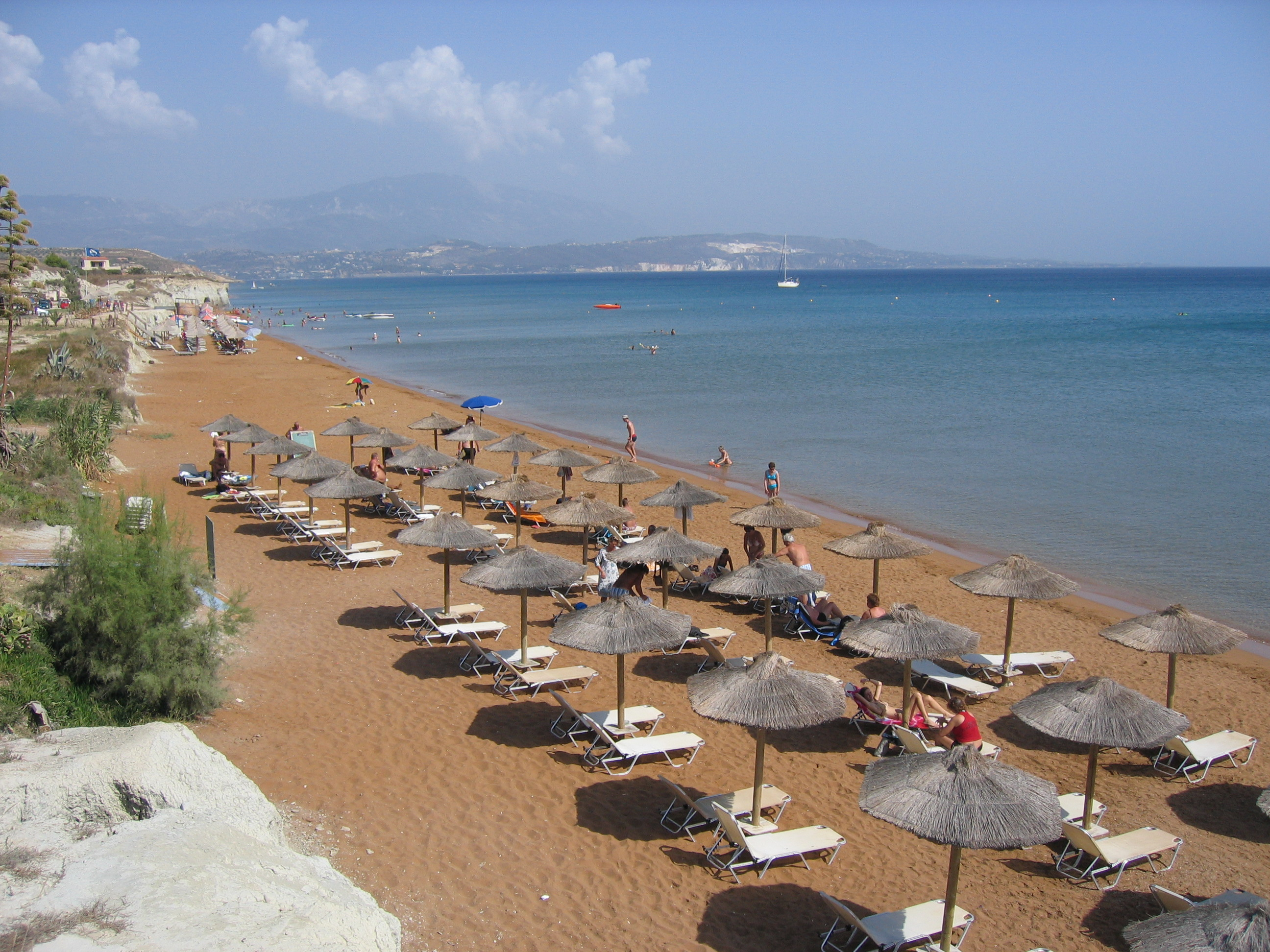
Areas of Xi beach are well developed

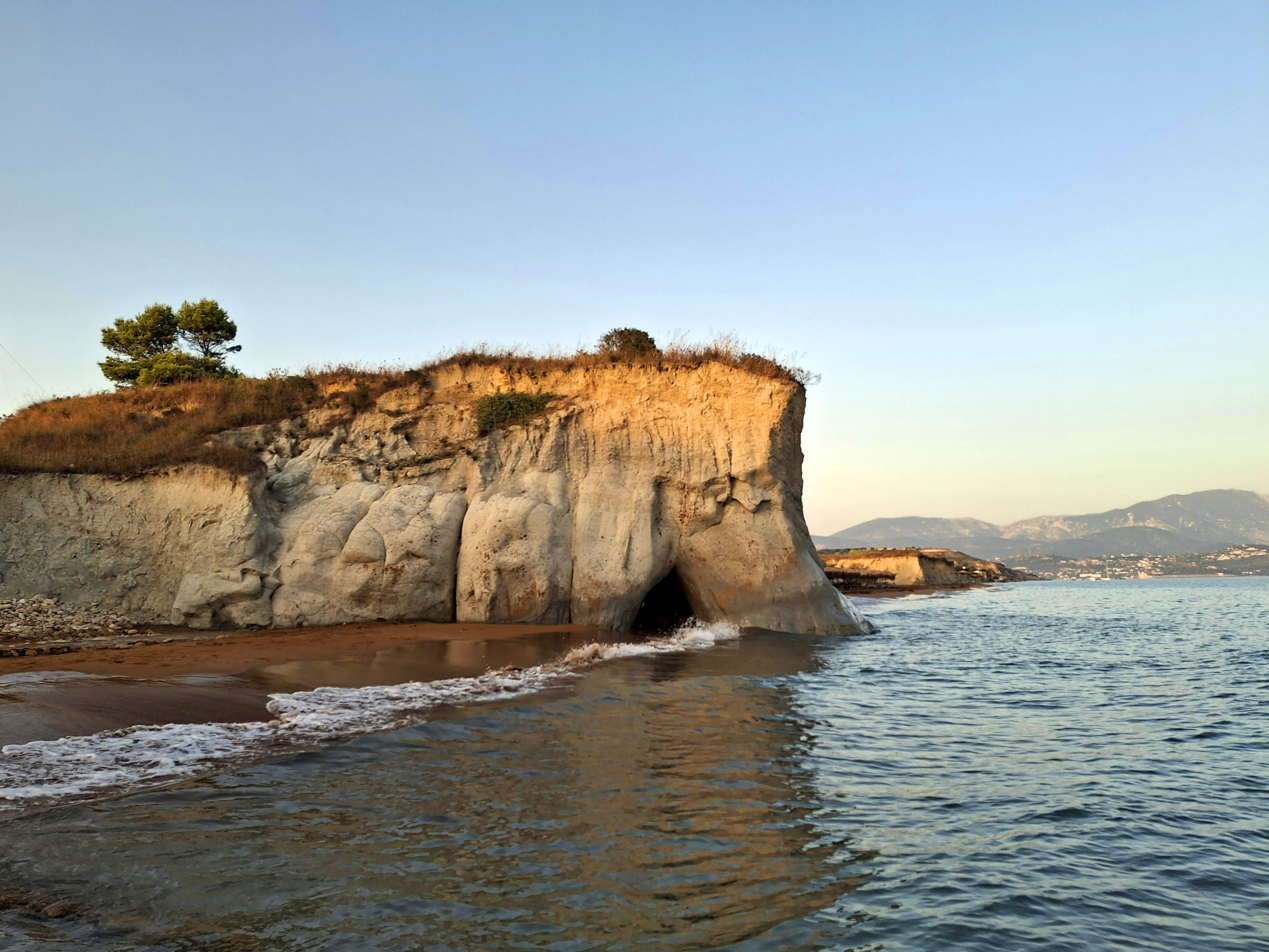
The eastern end of the beach, the beach Mia Lacco in the background

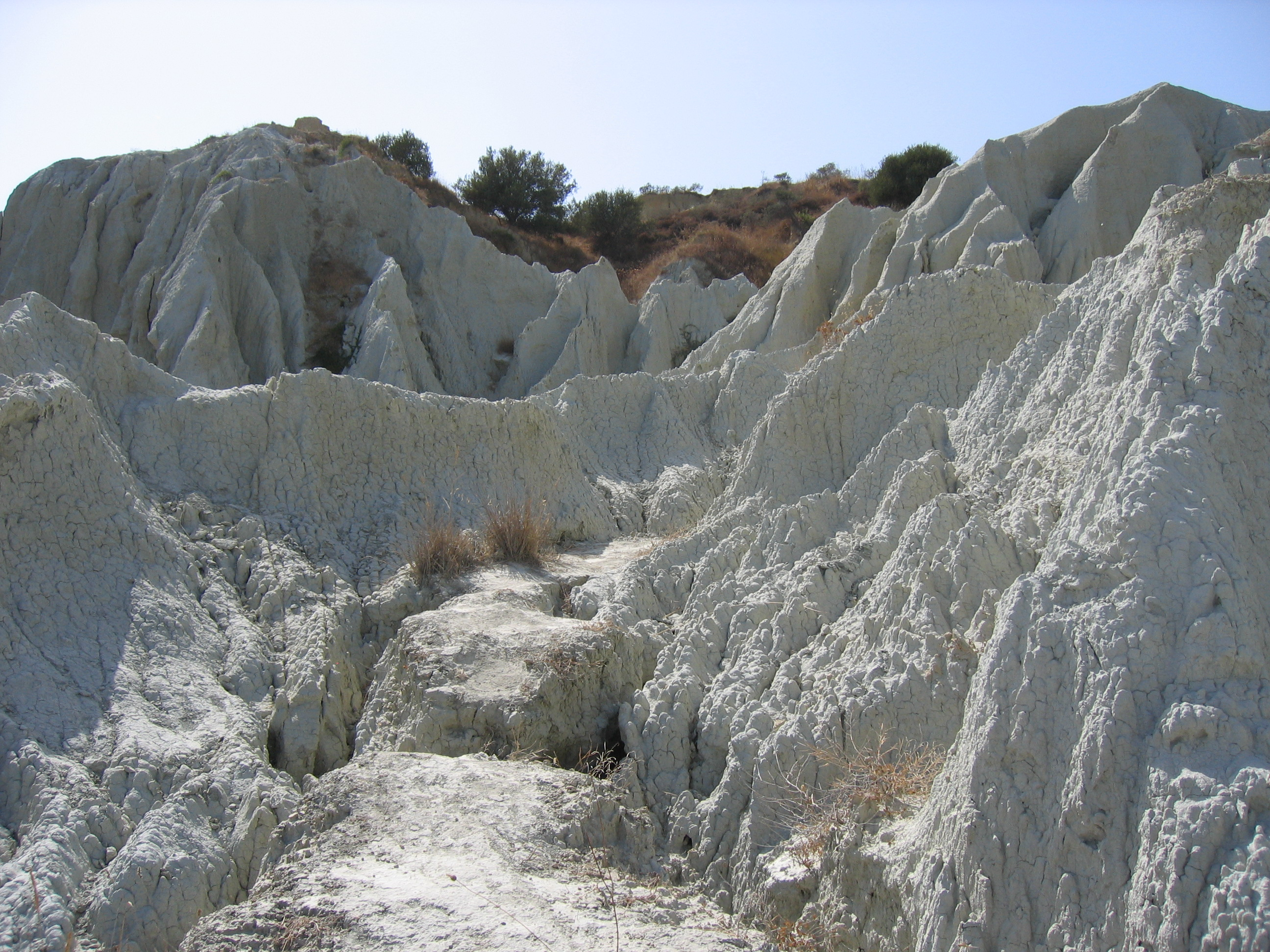
The cliffs are composed of a soft, white clay which has been eroded by the rain

Xi Beach is situated in the south of the Paliki peninsula of Kefalonia, Greece, and part of the district Mantzavinata near the town of Lixouri. Its reddish sand and clay cliffs shaped by the nature, make it truly unique. It is the geosite nr. 03 of the UNESCO Geopark Kefalonia Ithaka.

== Location ==
Its location can be seen in Google Maps.

The beach is a 3.3 kilometres (2.1 mi) strip of sand which is up to 50 metres (160 ft) wide in places. Several roads branch on the approach to the area and bring one out at different locations along its length, usually close to a bar, taverna or apartment complex.

== Character ==
Xi is renowned for its soft, red sand. It is a Blue Flag beach. The sand slopes reasonably gently so that one can go out a distance from the shoreline. The areas of the beach that are close to hotels are developed and organised with beach loungers and sun shades. Areas that are away from amenities present a more natural aspect.

== Geology ==
The geological formations of Xi Beach are primarily composed of blue clays from the late Pliocene and early Pleistocene (approximately 3.5 to 0.781 million years ago). Particle size analysis of these sediments revealed that they consist of 1–2% sand, 29–54% silt, and 44–70% clay. These formations are approximately 300 meters thick and were deposited in a relatively deep marine environment, whose development is associated with intense tectonic events during the Pleistocene. Indicators of the depositional depth of these sediments include numerous microfossils such as planktonic foraminifera, bivalve remains, coccoliths, and otoliths of pelagic fish. Sea water, air, and atmospheric precipitation have shaped landscape-defining erosion features within the clay deposits. The red color of the beach results from the breakdown of clay minerals and the release of iron.

== Access ==
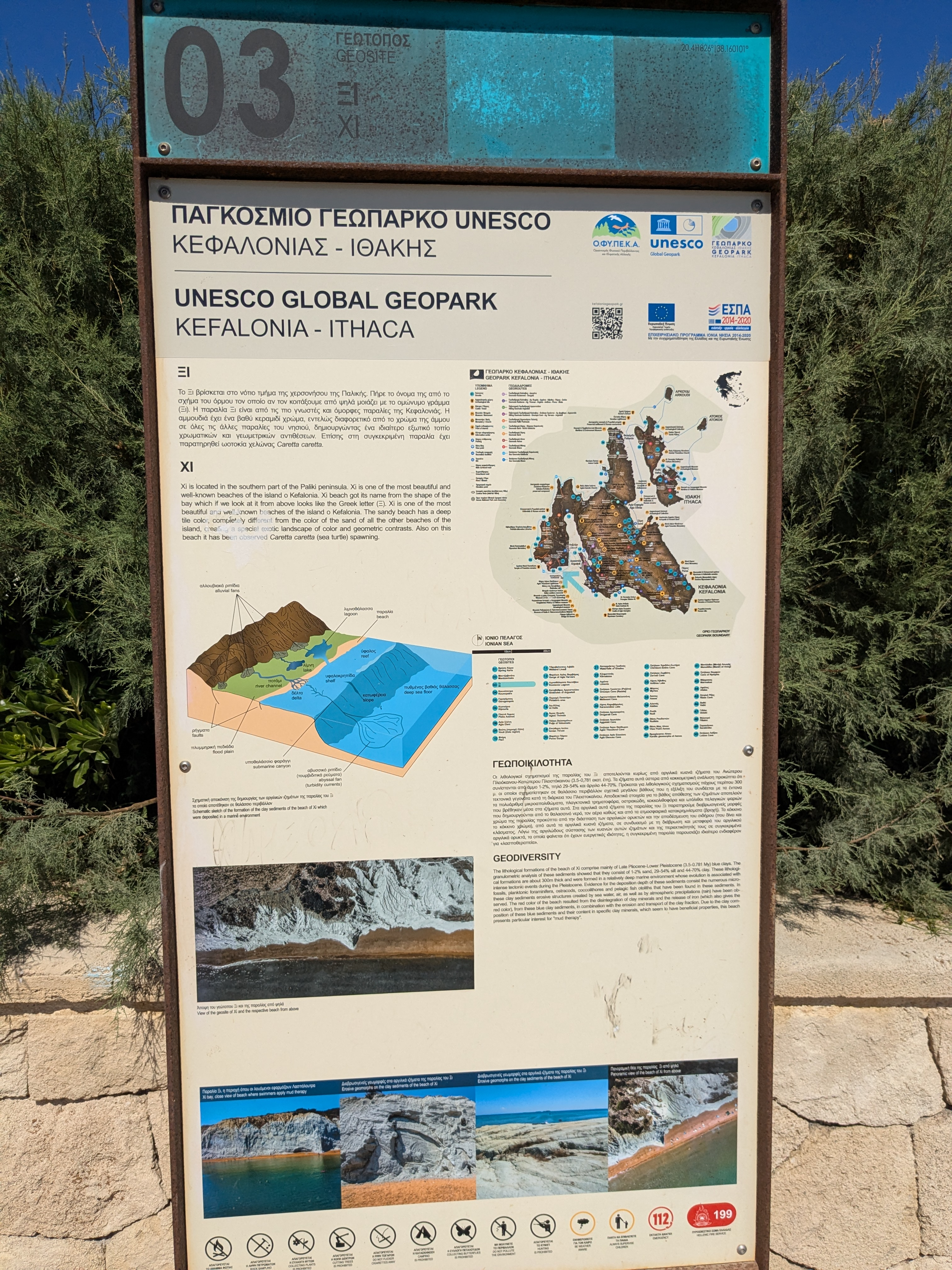
Geopark information panel at the eastern entrance

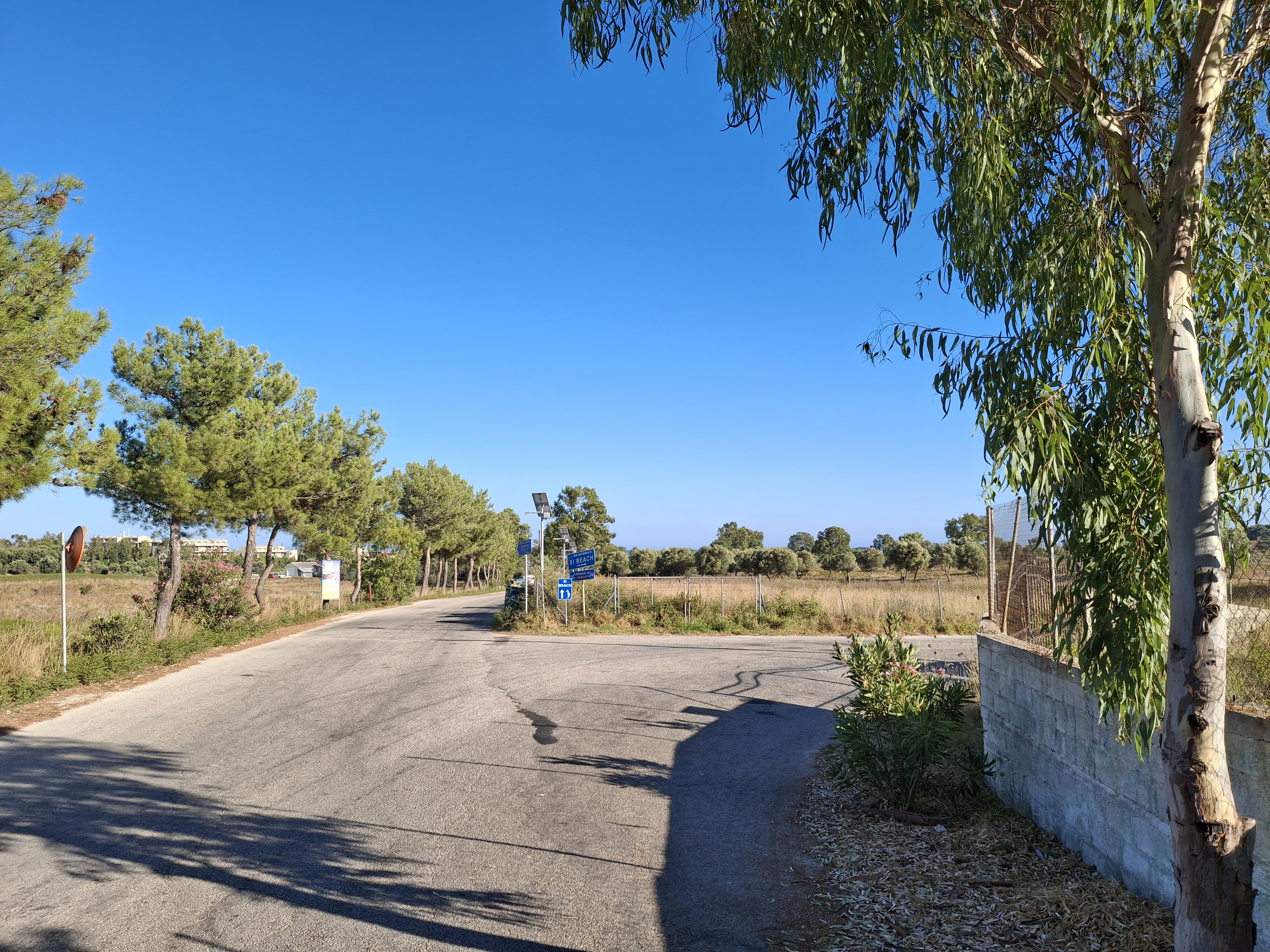
Fork in the trail: left to the eastern entrance, right to the western entrance

The access road is an asphalted road from Mantzavinata, which splits approximately 800 meters before the beach into two sections leading to different parts of the beach. At both entrances, there are showers and changing cabins. Additionally, the eastern entrance features several local eateries and shops, as well as two information panels.

== Infrastructure ==
The beach can be crowded at the height of the tourist season. There are several large Tavernas providing drinks and meals along the 3.3 km (2.1 mi) length of the beach area. Beach loungers and umbrellas are for hire in some areas of the beach, usually at points where hotels, Tavernas or bars are situated close to the beach. The area has some hotel complexes and apartments. The beaches are associated with a high population density of tourists in high season. In September the number of tourists decreases significantly, with continuation of good weather.

== Interesting Facts ==
- The name derives from the lowercase of the Greek letter Xi, which resembles the beach: ξ.
- The belief that water-soluble clay is good for the skin or has other therapeutic properties has been repeatedly disproven.
