= Lixouri =

Town in Kefalonia, Greece

Lixouri Ληξούρι
- Municipality
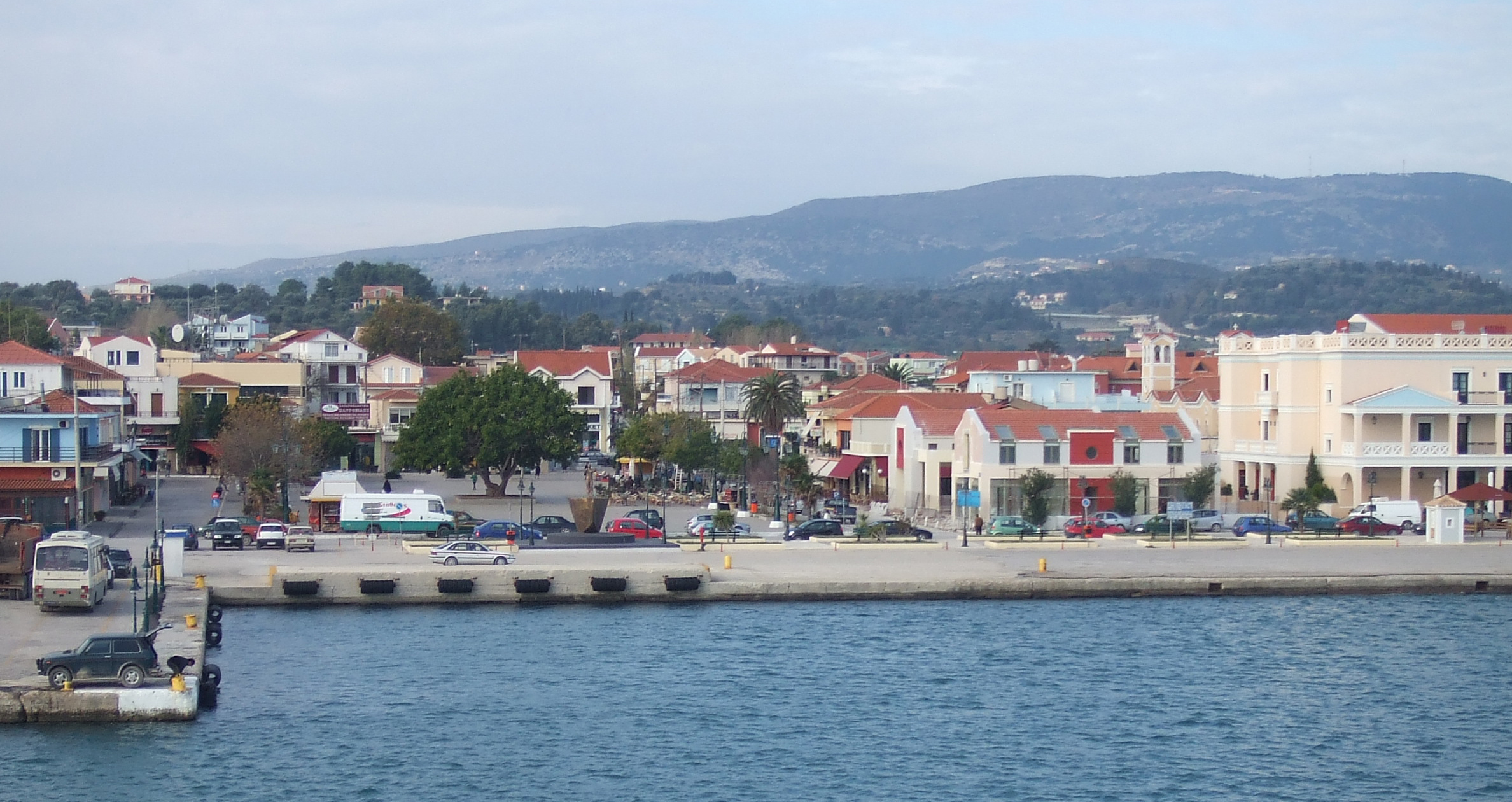

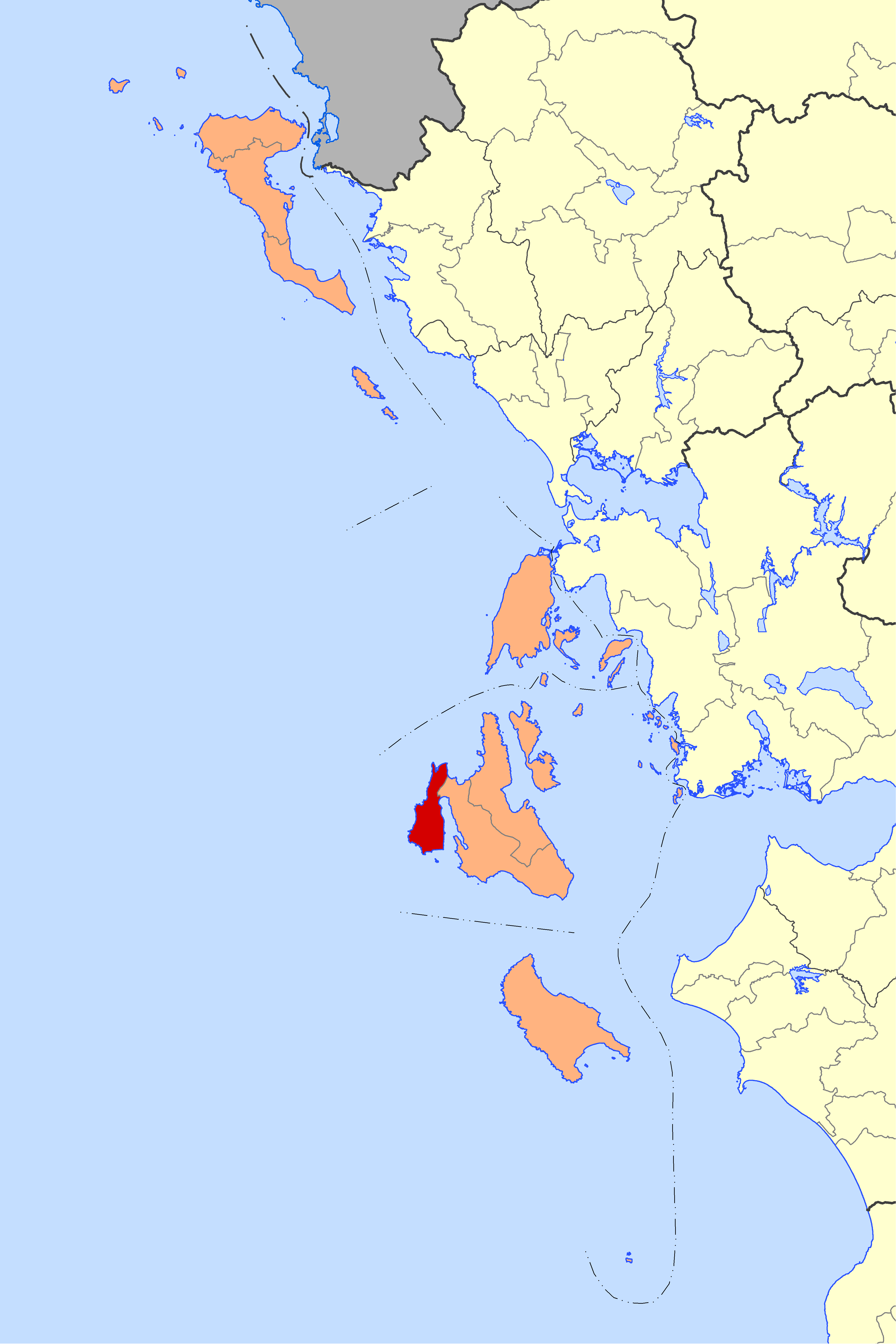

- Location within Greece
- Coordinates: 38°18′N 20°25′E
- Country: Greece
- Administrative region: Ionian Islands
- Regional unit: Kefalonia

Area
  - Municipality: 119.6 km^{2} (46.2 sq mi)
  - Community: 14.521 km^{2} (5.607 sq mi)

Population (2021)
  - Municipality: 6,989
  - Density: 58.44/km^{2} (151.3/sq mi)
  - Community: 4,128
  - Community density: 284.3/km^{2} (736.3/sq mi)
- Time zone: UTC+2 (EET)
  - Summer (DST): UTC+3 (EEST)
- Postal code: 282 00
- Area code: 26710
- Vehicle registration: KEA-KEB
- Website: www.paliki.gr

Lixouri (Greek: Ληξούρι) is a town and a municipality in the island of Kefalonia, the largest of the Ionian Islands of western Greece.

It is the main town on the peninsula of Paliki, and the second largest town in Kefalonia after Argostoli and before Sami. It is located south of Fiskardo and west of Argostoli. Since the 2019 local government reform it is one of the three municipalities on the island. It has one municipal unit that is coterminous with the municipality: Paliki.

This region is renowned for its numerous beaches, including Xi, Fteri, and Petani, which are celebrated for their natural beauty and crystal-clear waters.

== History ==
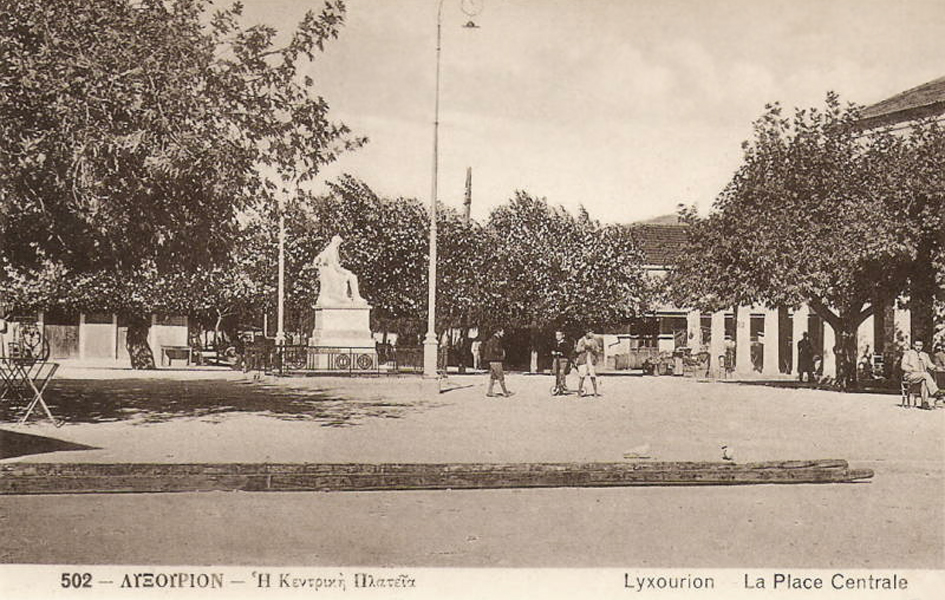
Central square of Lixouri in 1910

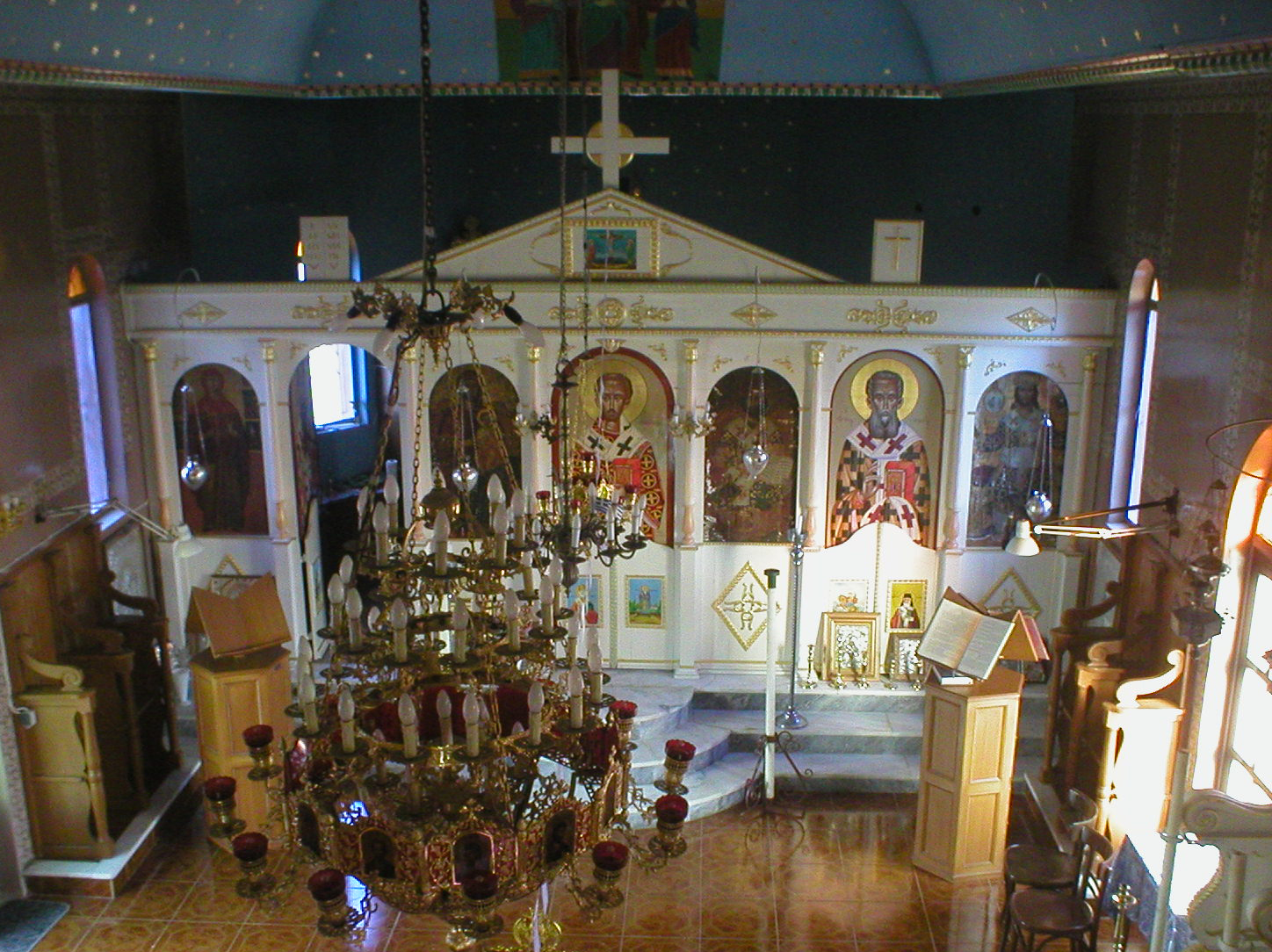
Inside St.Sofia's Church in Mantzavinata

Lixouri was founded when citizens of the ancient town of Pale/Pali found a new location suitable for inhabitation. The new town was named after Paleas or Pileas, one of the four sons of the mythical king Kefalos (the island was named after king Kefalos). The old city was abandoned completely by the 16th century, but some ancient ruins can still be seen north of the town. The oldest document which contains the name "Lixouri" was sent in 1534 by local authorities to the Senate of Venice. In the 19th century Lixouri was a popular tourist destination; Richard Strauss visited the town. Many houses were destroyed in the earthquakes on January 23, 1867, and in August 1953. In the early 1950s the Royal Family of Greece sent their children for summer holidays to Lixouri. In the 1990s Lixouri increased in popularity as a tourist destination and some larger hotels were built south of the town near the beaches.

== Literature ==
Lixouri is the home town of the poet and satirical author Andreas Laskaratos, who wrote about life in his home town. The Kay Cicellis book "Death of a Town" (1954) begins in Lixouri and describes the time of the earthquake. In 1720 Petros Katsaitis, who lived in Lixouri, wrote his play "Iphigenia"; Spyros Evangelatos' edition of the play in 1995 retitled it "Iphigenia in Lixouri". Ilka Chase wrote about the town in "The Varied Airs of Spring" (1969) as did Georges Haldas in "A la recherche du rameau d'or" (1976).

== Infrastructure ==
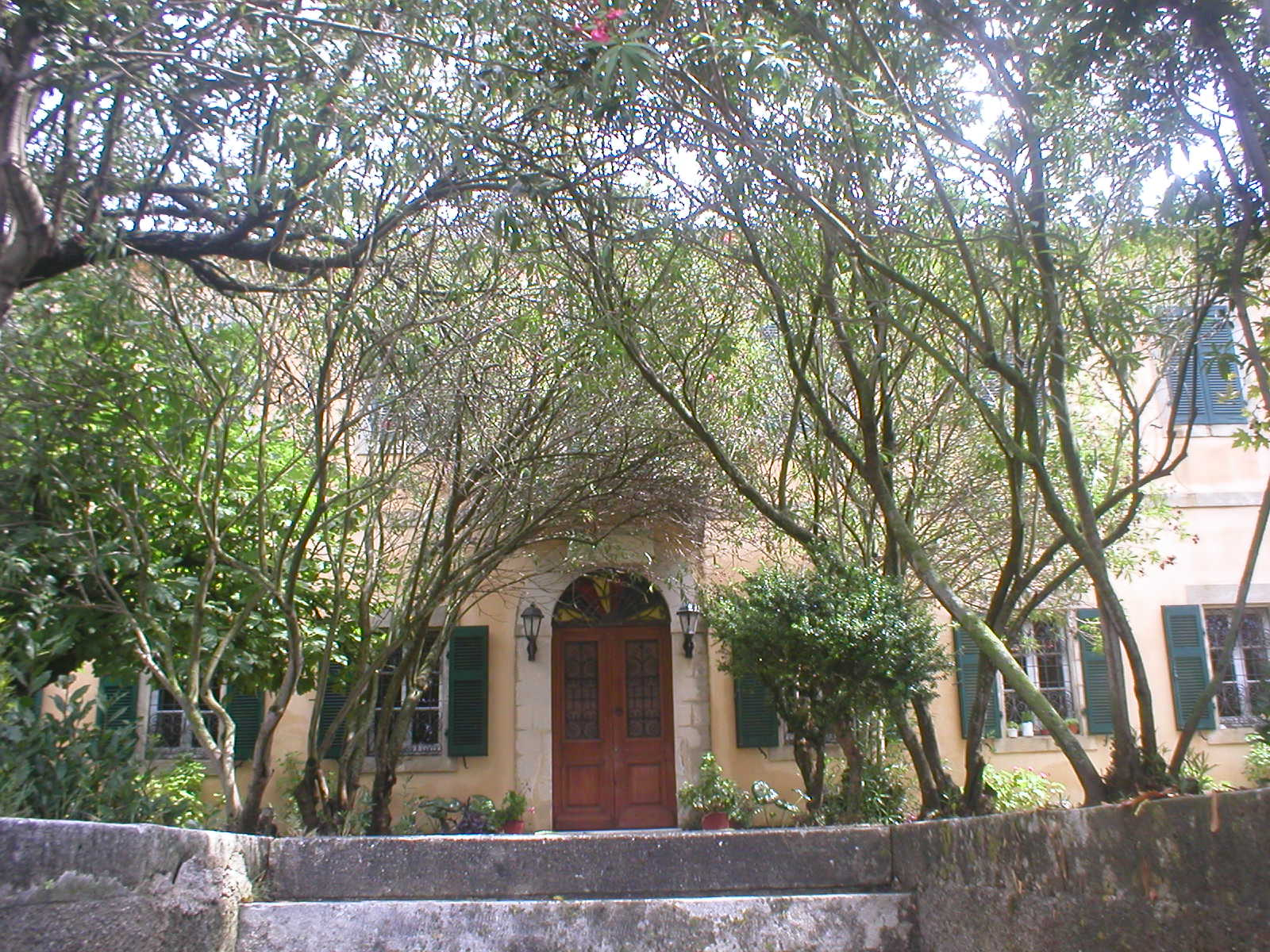
Iakovatios Library (and Museum)

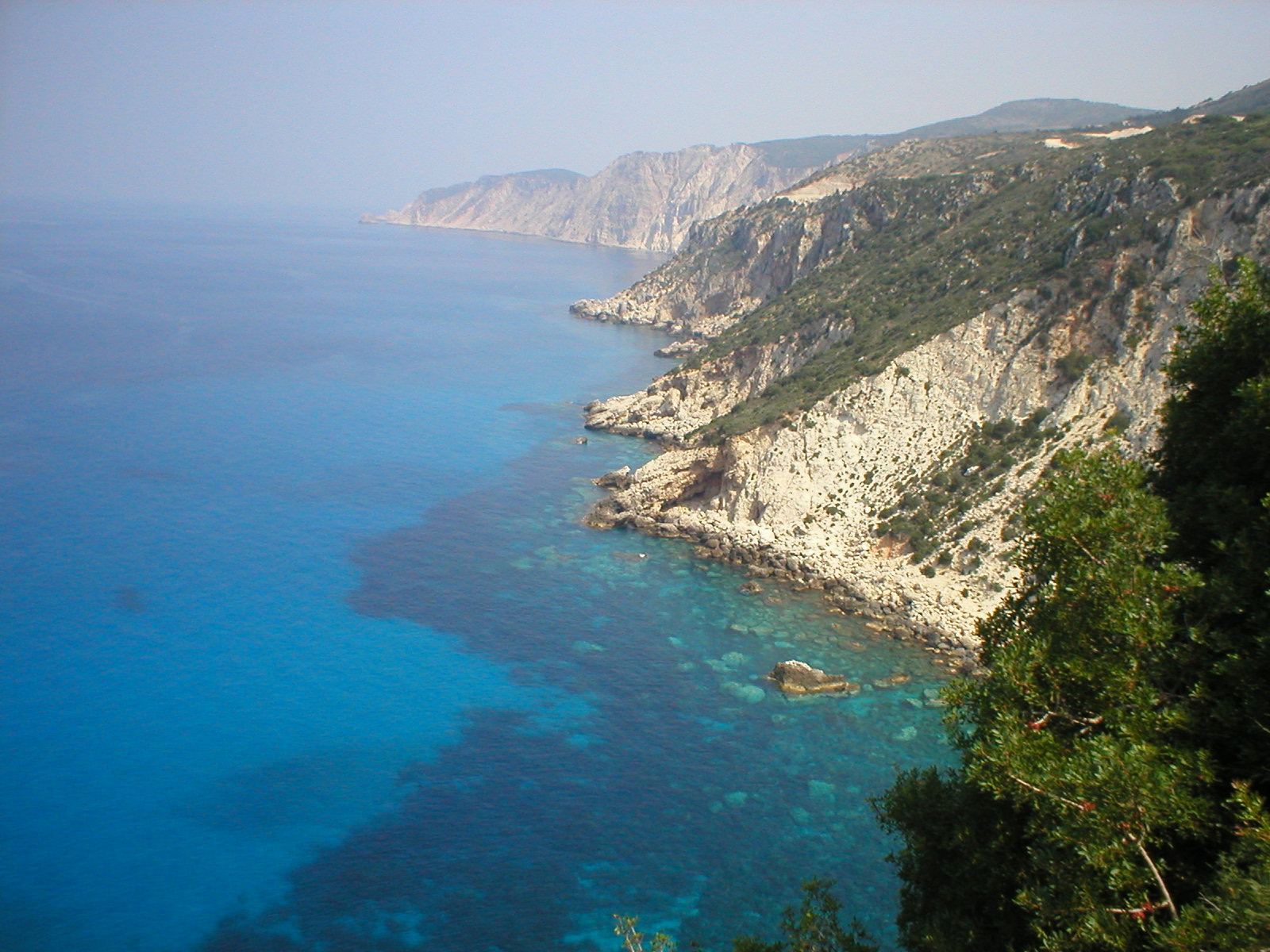
Ionian Sea view from Moni Kipoureon monastery.

Lixouri has a few primary schools and few middle schools (gymnasia), and high schools (lyceums). The 1st Primary School of Lixouri is one of the few buildings in the town that still stands from before the 1953 earthquake. The Ionian university has a campus in Lixouri, where the department of Ethnomusicology.

The public library and a museum are located at the Iakovateios building, also preserved from before the earthquake. Since 2003 Lixouri also has a theatre.

== Transportation ==
Lixouri has a small port with a ferry to Argostoli for vehicles under 5 tons, running every hour or half-hour in peak season. In the summer, there is a service to Patras and Killini on the mainland. The KTEL bus service has a station in Lixouri with routes to Patras and Athens, via the port of Sami. There is a twice-daily bus service to the villages of the Paliki peninsula. Some hotels provide offer bus services, including to the XI-Beach and Kounopetra.

== Demographics ==
Year	Town population	Community population
1981	3,004	-
1991	3,181	-
2001	3,610	3,940
2011	3,752	4,301
2021	3,549	4,128

== Subdivisions ==
The municipality of Lixouri contains one municipal unit: Paliki. This municipal unit consists of the following communities (that were independent municipalities and communities before the 1997 Kapodistrias reform). Constituent settlements are given in brackets.

- Agia Thekli (Agia Thekli, Kalata)
- Atheras
- Chavdata
- Chavriata (Agios Ioannis, Chavriata)
- Damoulianata
- Favatata
- Kaminarata (Kaminarata, Moni Kipouraion)
- Katogi (Mantzavinata, Vardianoi (island), Vouni)
- Kontogenada
- Kouvalata (Kouvalata, Livadi)
- Lixouri (Agios Dimitrios, Agios Vasileios, Lepeda, Lixouri, Loukerata, Michalitsata)
- Monopolata (Delaportata, Monopolata, Parisata)
- Rifi
- Skineas (Skineas, Vlychata)
- Soullaroi

== Sports ==
- Pallixouriakos F.C., football
- Poseidonas Lixouriou, waterpolo and other watersports

== Notable people ==
- Georgios Bonanos (1863–1940), sculptor
- Antiochos Evangelatos (1903–1981), composer and conductor
- Andreas Laskaratos (1811–1901), poet
- Spyridon Marinatos (1901–1974), archaeologist
- Dionysios Zakythinos (1905–1993), Byzantinist
- Giovanni Francesco Zulatti (1762–1805), physician and author

== See also ==
- List of settlements in Cephalonia
