= Paliki =

Paliki Παλική
- Municipal unit
- Location within the regional unit

- Location within Greece
- Coordinates: 38°18′N 20°25′E
- Country: Greece
- Administrative region: Ionian Islands
- Regional unit: Kefalonia
- Municipality: Lixouri

Area
  - Municipal unit: 119.341 km^{2} (46.078 sq mi)
- Elevation: 5 m (16 ft)

Population (2021)
  - Municipal unit: 6,989
  - Municipal unit density: 58.56/km^{2} (151.7/sq mi)
- Time zone: UTC+2 (EET)
  - Summer (DST): UTC+3 (EEST)
- Postal code: 280 81
- Area code: 26710
- Vehicle registration: ΚΕ
- Website: www.paliki.gr

Cephalonia and Ithaca, elevation map

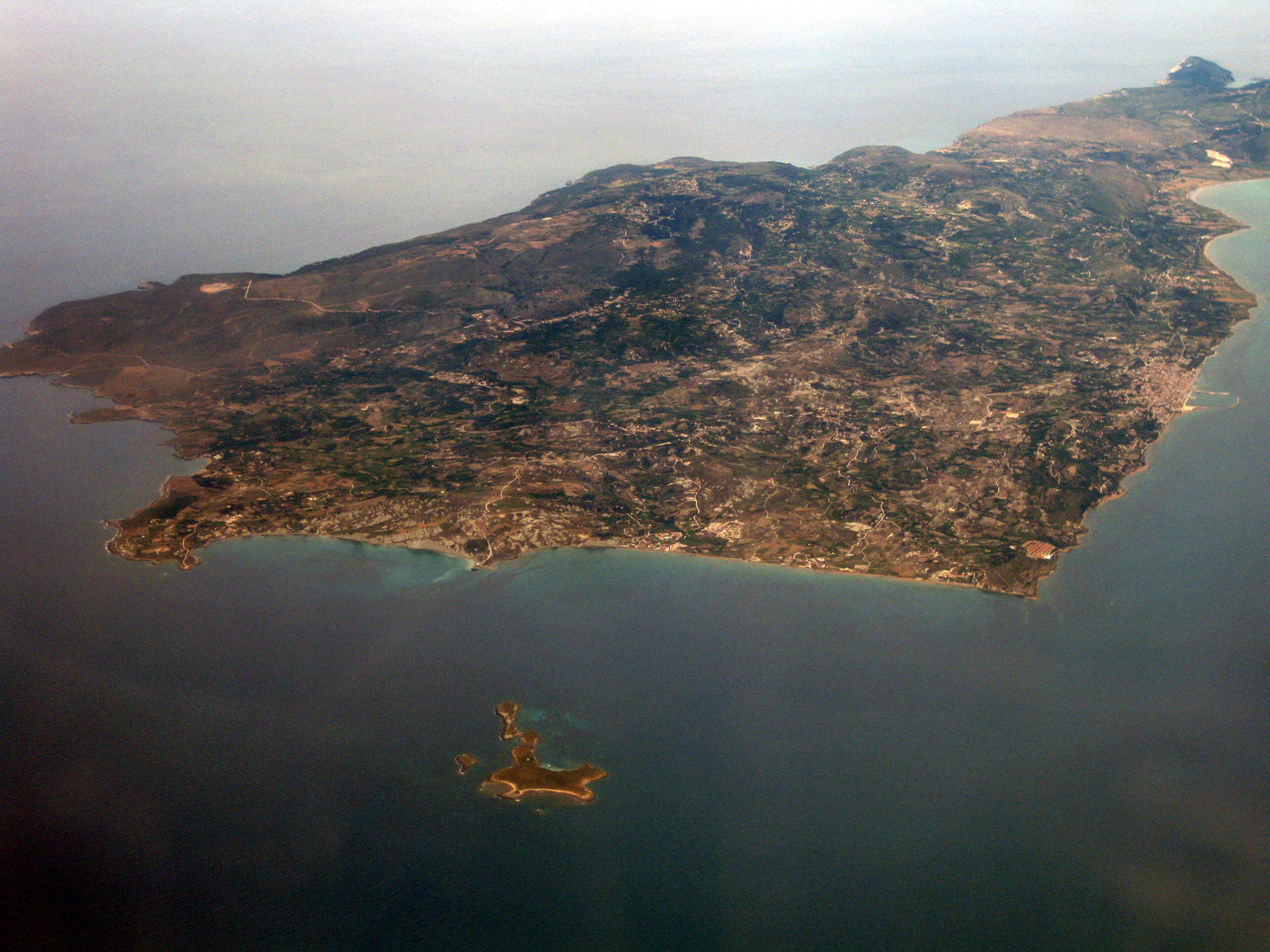
The peninsula from southeast

Paliki (Greek: Παλική) is a peninsula and a former municipality on the island of Kefalonia, Ionian Islands, Greece. At the 2011 local government reform it became part of the municipality Kefalonia. In 2019 this municipality was divided into three municipalities, and the municipal unit Paliki became the only municipal unit of the new municipality Lixouri. The municipal unit has an area of 119.341 km^{2}. The name comes from the ancient town of Pale/Pali, which was north of Lixouri and is now an archaeological site. The peninsula is the westernmost part of Kefalonia. The seat of the municipality was the town Lixouri (3,752).

== Subdivisions ==
The municipal unit Paliki is subdivided into the following communities (that were independent municipalities and communities before the 1997 Kapodistrias reform, constituent villages in brackets):

- Agia Thekla (Agia Thekla, Kalata)
- Atheras
- Chavdata
- Chavriata
- Damoulianata
- Favatata
- Kaminarata
- Katogi (Mantzavinata, Vardianoi, Vouni)
- Kontogenada
- Kouvalata (Kouvalata, Livadi)
- Lixouri (Lixouri, Agios Vasileios, Agios Dimitrios, Lepeda, Longos, Loukerata, Michalitsata)
- Monopolata (Monopolata, Dellaportata, Parisata)
- Rifi
- Skineas (Skineas, Vlychata)
- Soullaroi

== Province ==
Pali Province (Greek: Επαρχία Πάλης) was one of the provinces of Cephalonia Prefecture. Its territory corresponded with that of the current municipal unit Paliki. It was abolished in 2006.

== Geography ==
Paliki is a peninsula in the Ionian Sea, attached to mainland Cephalonia in the northeast. On the east side, the Gulf of Argostoli separates Paliki from Cephalonia. Mountains up to 500 m cover the western and northern part of the peninsula.

== History ==
The oldest document which contains the name "Lixouri" was sent in 1534 by local authorities to the Senate of Venice. Many houses were destroyed in the earthquakes of January 23, 1867 and August 1953.

== Sights ==
- Iakovatios Library, the communal library with a small museum. Typical classic Ionian building from 19th century.
- Former primary school near the harbour. Avant-garde 20th-century building from 1933, representing the modernist architecture movement in Greece
- Pantokrator Church
- A few ruins of ancient Pali in the north
- Mania beach with beautiful untouched landscape
- Mantzavinata - Agios Spyridon Church and classical house of the Vittoratos Family
- Classical house of the Danelatos Family in Damoulianata
- Agia Paraskevi Church in Atheras
- Kipouria monastery
- Vatsa Bay
- Xi Beach

== Homer's Ithaca ==
According to Robert Bittlestone's 2005 book Odysseus Unbound, Paliki was Homer's Ithaca, the home of Odysseus, the central figure in the Odyssey of Homer.

== Persons ==
- Andreas Laskaratos, a teacher, satirical poet and writer
- Spyridon Marinatos (1901–1974), archaeologist
