= Molos Gulf =

Bay of the Ionian Sea on the east coast of Ithaca, western Greece

Coordinates: 38.38°N 20.69°E

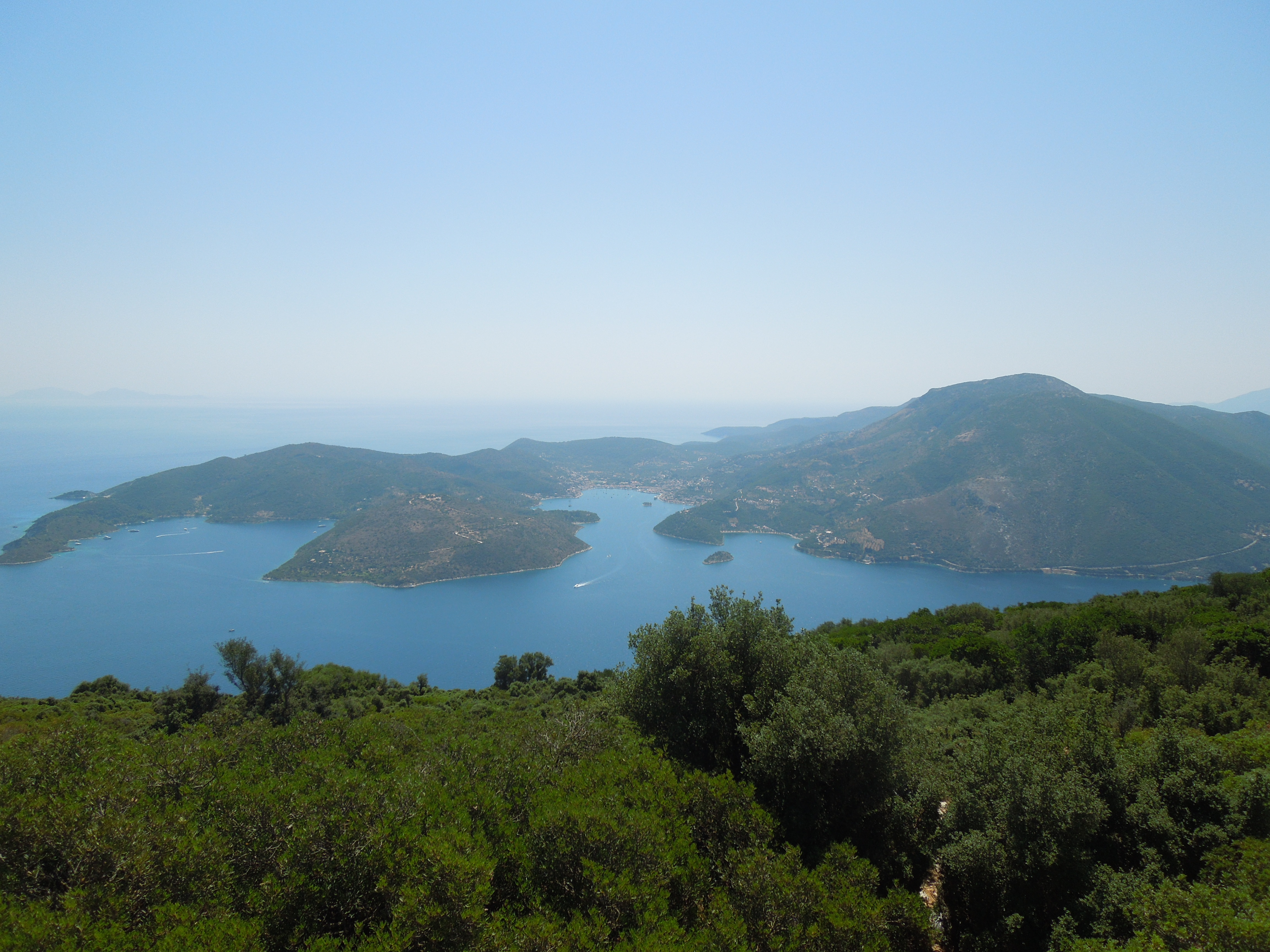
View over Molos Gulf towards Vahty

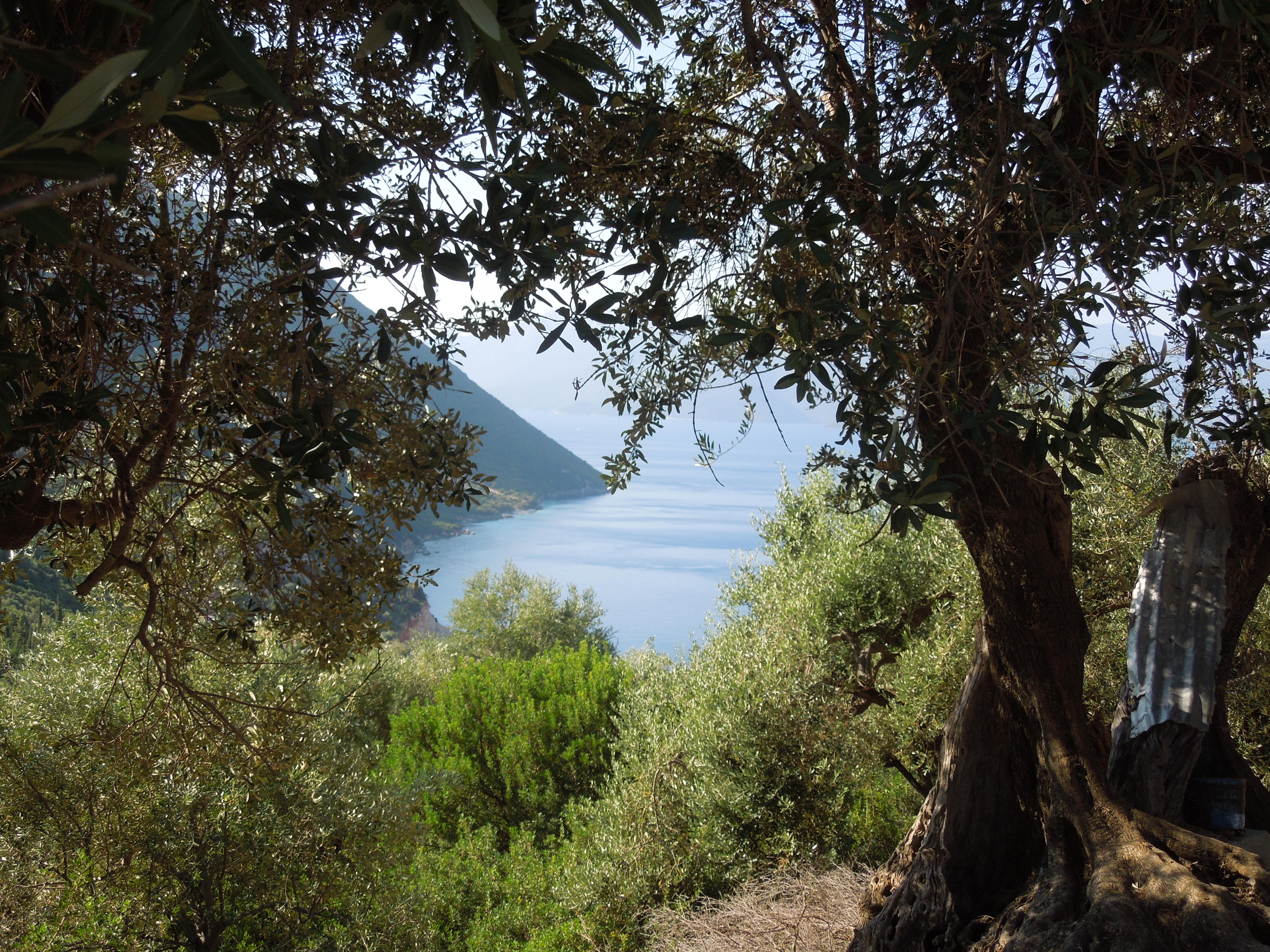
View of the Molos Gulf

The Molos Gulf (Greek: Κόλπος Μώλου - Kolpos Molou) is a bay of the Ionian Sea on the east coast of the island Ithaca, western Greece. It penetrates deep into the island and cuts it nearly into two parts, that are only connected by the 620 m wide isthmus of Aetos.

The main town of the island, Vathy, is situated on a branch on the southeastern side of the gulf. There are two uninhabited islets in the gulf: Lazareto and Skartsoumponisi.
