= Lazareto (Ithaca) =

Greek islet in the Ionian Sea

Native name: Λαζαρέτο
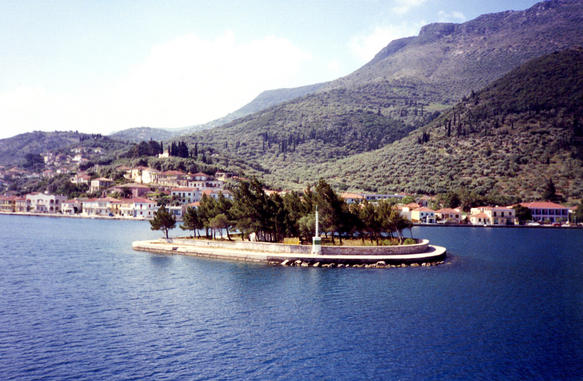
- The bay of Vathy with Lazareto in the center.

- Location within Greece

Geography
- Location: Ionian Sea
- Coordinates: 38.3683°N 20.7126°E
- Archipelago: Ionian Islands

Administration
- Greece
- Region: Ionian Islands
- Municipality: Ithaca

Demographics
- Population: 0 (2011)

Lazareto (Greek: Λαζαρέτο) is an islet in the bay of Vathy, Ithaca, one of the Ionian Islands in Greece. As of 2011, it had no resident population.
