= Kioni Bay =

Bay in Ithaca, Greece

Kioni Bay is positioned in the northeast of the Greek island of Ithaca, near Kioni village.

It has remained relatively unspoiled by major tourist development. The village has been characterised as a 'traditional settlement' and therefore strict planning rules apply. Kioni Bay is a popular destinations for sailing boats.

== Geography ==
The Kioni Bay is situated on the northeastern shore of the island of Ithaca.

It is east of the village of Kioni. Kioni is linked with a road going westward to Frikes and the rest of the island. The Nirito mountains dominates the southwest.
