= De Bosset Bridge =

De Bosset Bridge Γέφυρα Ντε Μποσέ
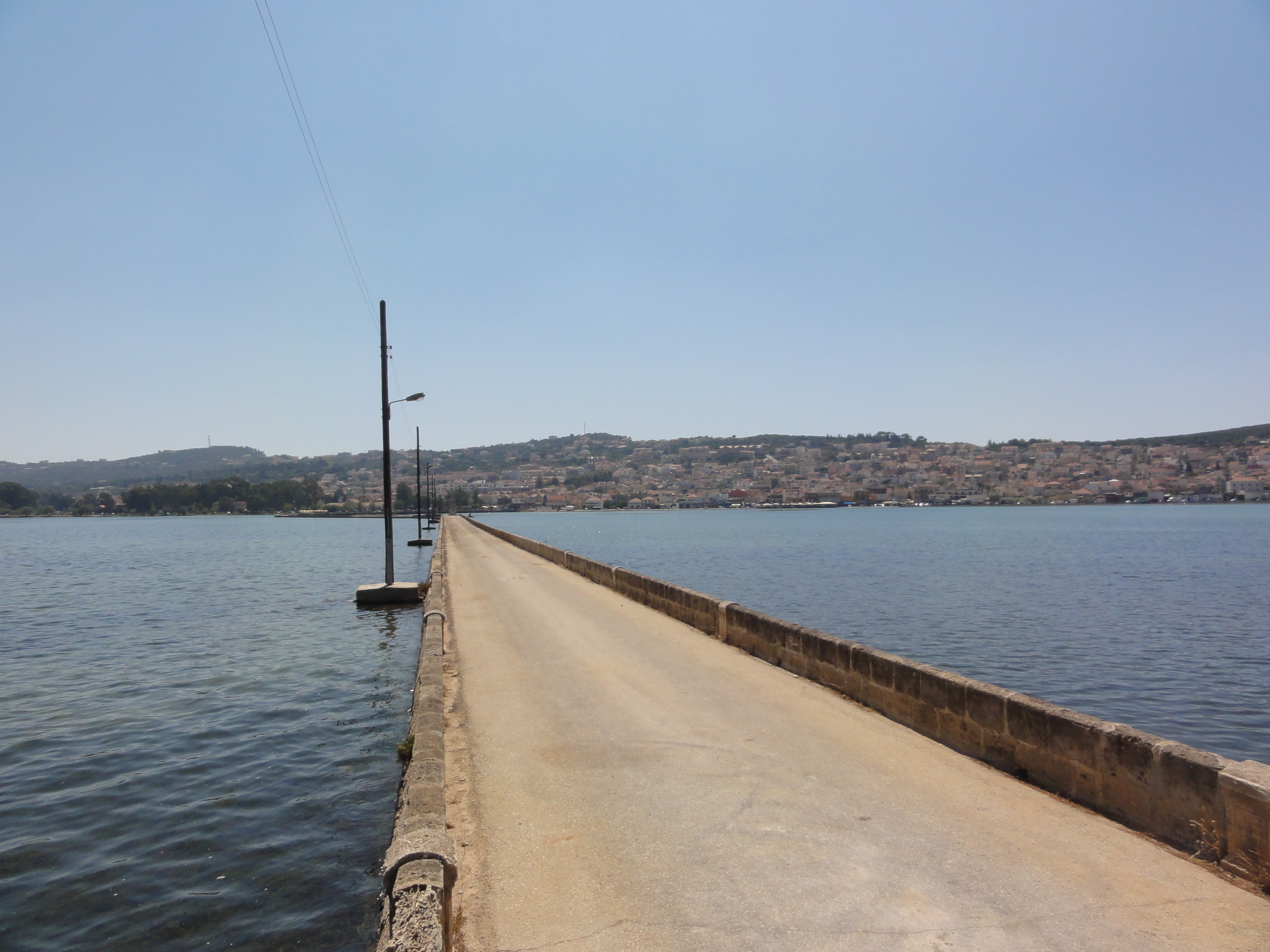
- De Bosset Bridge shortly before restoration
- Coordinates: 38°10′30″N 20°29′45″E
- Carries: Pedestrian (footbridge)
- Locale: Argostoli, Cephalonia, Greece

Characteristics
- Material: Stone
- Total length: 689.9 metres (2,263 ft)

History
- Construction end: 1813; 212 years ago

The De Bosset Bridge (formerly Drapano Bridge) is a stone bridge built in 1813 over the bay of Argostoli in Kefalonia. At 689.9 meters, it is the longest stone bridge crossing the sea.

== History ==
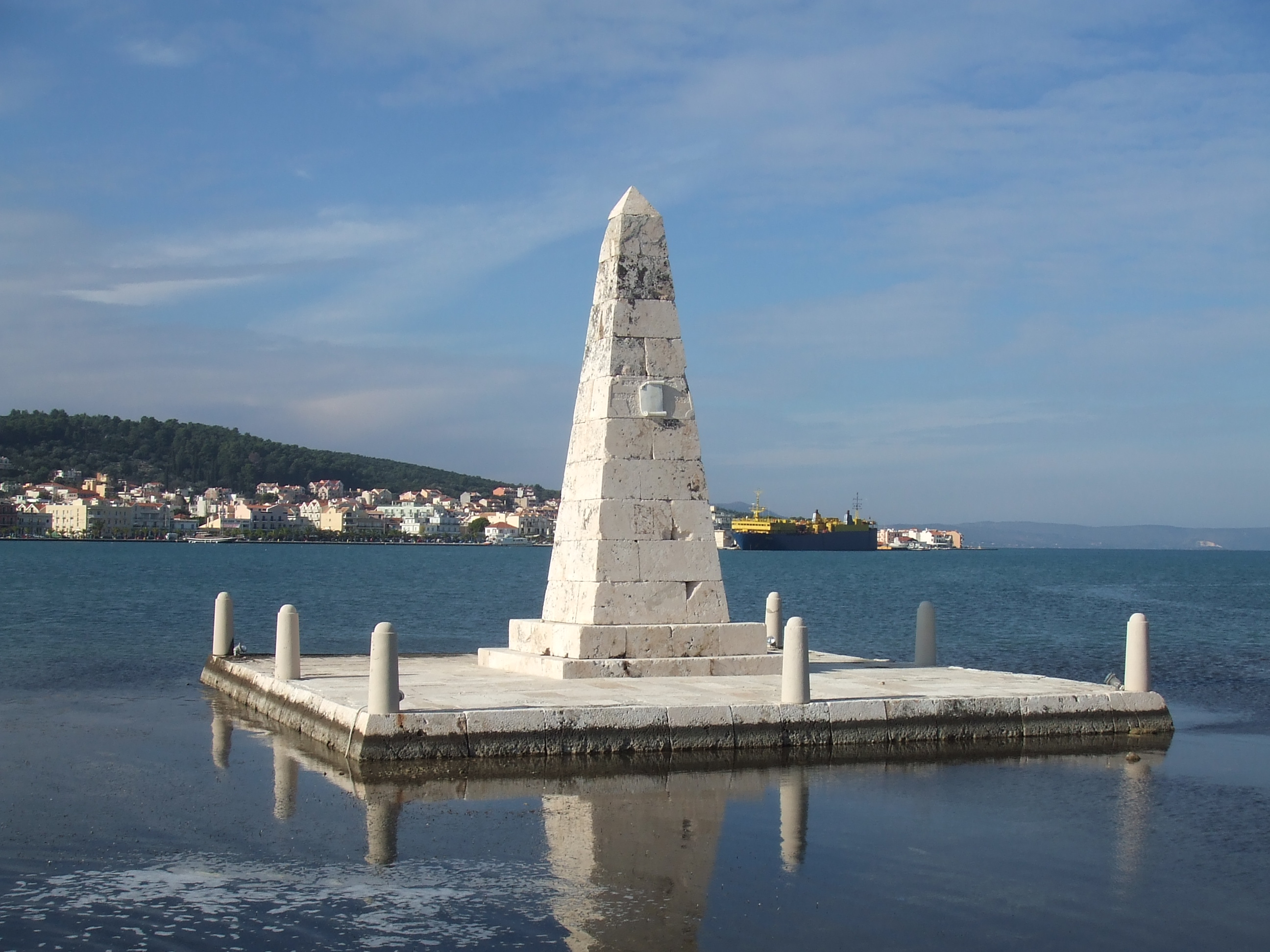
The Obelisk

When the Republic of the Ionian Islands was under British patronage, various infrastructure projects were undertaken, commencing by those ordered by the Swiss-born military officer Charles Philippe de Bosset, serving as the island's governor, since 1810. The projects focused on improving roads and bridges. Numerous connections were shortened with bridges over ravines. By far the biggest project was the bridge over the Bay of Argostoli to Drapano, which shortened the way to Lixouri and the north of the island. It separates the Koutavos lagoon from the bay.

In 1812, De Bosset presented his idea of a bridge to the island council, which had to endorse the construction. The counterargument was that the bridge could give robbers a slight escape route, since its northern end is (then as today) unpopulated. In a meeting, De Bosset struck a sword on the table and proclaimed that if necessary he could disperse petty concerns.

First, the bridge was constructed of wood, which was then replaced immediately piece by piece with a bridge of sandstone. The bridge pavement is loaded on 16 low stone arches, one of them is filled. On a small man-made island along the bridge is an obelisk monument of British patronage. During the 1953 Ionian earthquake parts of the bridge collapsed. After backfilling and straightening of the pavement these damages remain visible from the side until today. In 1970, the bridge was listed as a historical monument.

As the bridge ends relatively central in Argostoli, its utility has recently proven to be counterproductive to keep the traffic out of the city. The bridge was closed successively in 2009 for heavy duty traffic and then for cars. In 2005, the seismic safety of the bridge was controlled, and an exchange of concrete fillings for sandstone was recommended. From 2011 to 2013, the bridge was renovated and re-opened as a pedestrian bridge. In the course of the restoration, the concrete fillings from 1953 were replaced by sandstone, the asphalt was replaced by paving and the light poles anchored in the sea were replaced by replicas of the original lanterns.

== Literature ==
- Laboratory of Building Materials, A.U.T.H.: Report for the ‘Evaluation of the results from the analysis of samples of stone and concrete taken from the DeBosset bridge in Kefalonia’, Thessaloniki 2004
- Pitilakis, K.D: Final Report for the ‘Restoration and Consolidation of the historic bridge DeBosset in Argostoli’, Laboratory of soil mechanics and Earthquake Geotechnical Engineering, A.U.T.H. Thessaloniki 2006
