= Charles Philippe de Bosset =

Swiss military officer (1773–1845)

Lieutenant-General Charles Philippe de Bosset CB
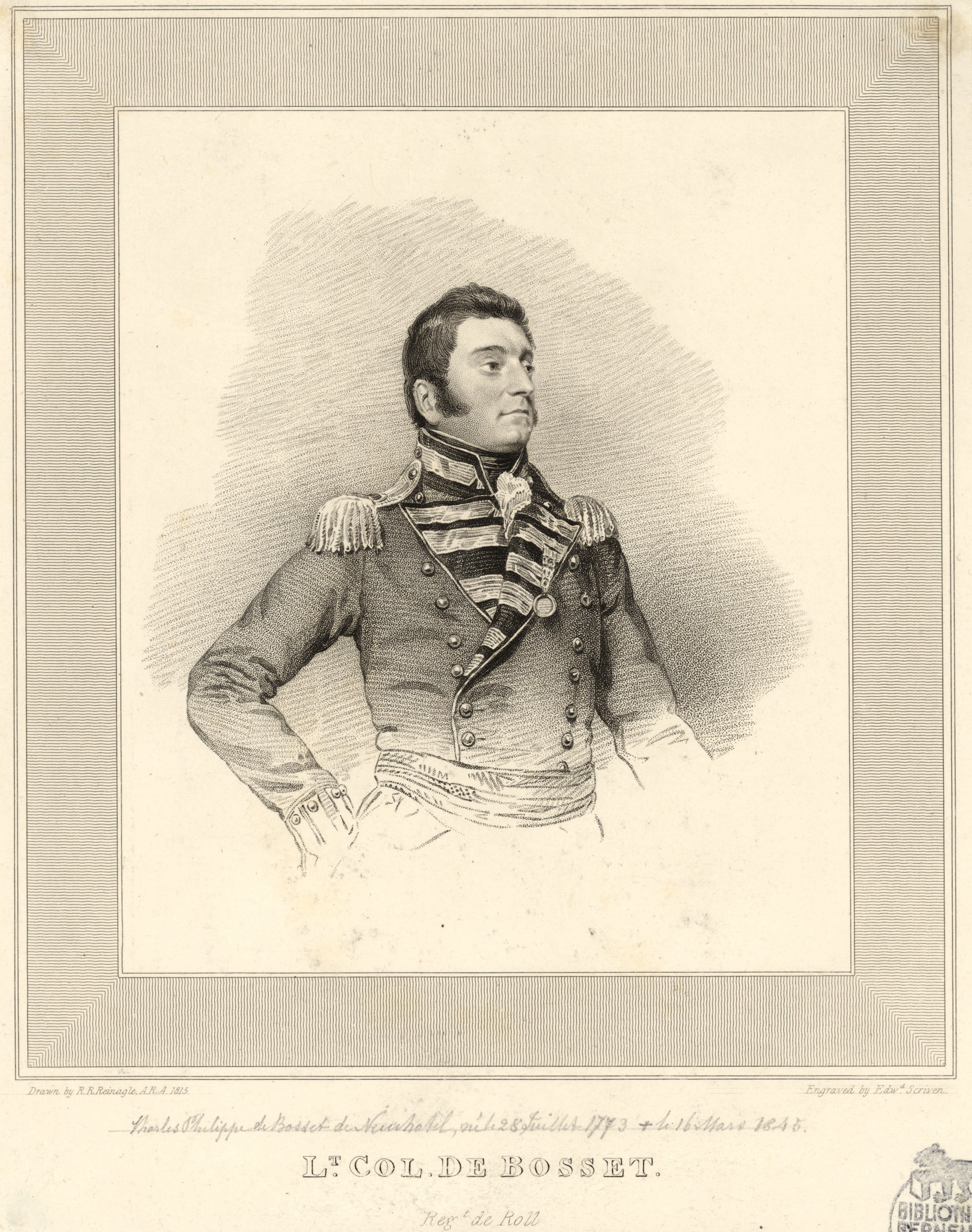
- Lieutenant-Colonel de Bosset, c. 1815
- Born: 29 July 1773; Neuchâtel, then Prussian protectorate, in modern Switzerland
- Died: 15 March 1845 (aged 71); Neuchâtel
- Known for: Distinguished service in combat with the Coalition military forces; Governor of Cephalonia (1810–14)
- Spouse: Fildesley Holmes
- Parent(s): Charles-Abel de Bosset; Philippine de Sandoz
- Relatives: Georges-Auguste de Bosset (1771–1775), brother Charlotte de Bosset (1750–1833), sister

Charles-Philippe de Bosset CB (1773–1845) was a Swiss military officer, who, as an officer of the British Army, was appointed and served as governor of the Ionian island of Cephalonia.

== Early life ==
Charles-Philippe de Bosset was born on 29 July 1773 in Neuchâtel of the Principality of Neuchâtel, Switzerland, the son of State Councillor Charles-Abel de Bosset (1732–1811), originally from La Neuveville, and Philippine-Régine de Sandoz (1750–1833), daughter of Lt. General François-Auguste Sandoz. He was the middle child between his siblings Georges-Auguste, who died a toddler, and Charlotte.

An Anglophile, young de Bosset, though having trained for a career in commerce, joined, in August 1796, Count Charles-Daniel de Meuron's Swiss Regiment. (Note: During the Napoleonic Wars, Britain raised three regiments of Swiss Mercenaries: the Meuron, Roll, and De Watteville Regiments. For more on Swiss serving in the British army during the Napoleonic era, see e.g. Nichols (2015).)

== Army service ==
While stationed in Switzerland, de Bosset, in September 1798, was ordered to London, from where he expected to be transferred to India. Instead, he was kept in England, undertaking various auxiliary missions. In April 1799, on account of developments in Europe, and, in particular, following the battles in Neuenegg, Fraubrunnen, and Grauholz, he was ordered back to his home country, where, in the ranks of the Coalition forces, he participated in the skirmishes leading up to the battle for Zurich, and distinguished himself in the battle itself, whose outcome was the retreat of the French forces under General André Masséna from the city. (Note: A few months later, in September 1799, the city fell back to the French after the Second Battle of Zurich.)

During his time in military action, de Bosset was observing and keeping notes on the structure and methods of deployment of the Coalition's forces, and assessing the reasons behind their defeat. William Wickham, British ambassador to Switzerland and also chief of intelligence, upon being made aware of de Bosset's observations, assigned de Bosset the task of travelling to St. Petersburg in order to personally apprise Lord Whitworth, ambassador to the Russian Empire, of his findings and submit his recommendations for addressing the weaknesses in the Coalition's forces.

Upon completing his mission, de Bosset was stationed in Augsburg. In 1801, he was returning to Augsburg from a furlough in England, aboard the Dauphin, a small warship with four cannons and a fourteen-men crew. Near Texel, the ship was attacked by the Napoléon, a French corsair with a dozen-cannon firepower commanded by captain Pollet de Boulogne. When the Dauphin resolved to defend itself, de Bosset ascended to the bridge wearing his red-coloured army uniform, determined, as he subsequently stated, to support the men's morale. The corsair's firing was subsequently concentrated on the Dauphin bridge, killing a person standing next to de Bosset. After almost two hours of battle, the Dauphin struck its colours and the French led the captured ship and its men to Amsterdam. The French consul, hearing the unanimous testimony of the corsair's crew to the effect that the person "wearing a bright red uniform" was "certainly" commanding the Coalition ship's defence, determined that de Bosset was a prisoner of war. In the course of an exchange of prisoners that took place some eight months after his capture, de Bosset was allowed to return to England.

In 1802, he was charged with recruiting to the British army non-British persons living in London, a task he accomplished but when the foreigners' corps was ordered to the continent it was assigned to someone else's command. In October 1802, he became a captain in the 2nd Line Battalion of the King's German Legion. By 1803, he was a lieutenant. He drew and presented to the Army’s Commander-in-Chief, the Duke of York and Albany, (Note: With a dedication, reading: "by his most humble, most obedient and most dutiful Servant Charles Philip de Bosset, Swiss Regt. de Meuron." See RCT.) a chart that outlines in graphic form the structure of the British Army on the eve of the Napoleonic Wars, with all its infantry, cavalry and artillery formations, including several foreign regiments, such as the West India Regiments, and specialist ones, like the 95th Rifles. During his time in the German Legion, he served in the Mediterranean (1806-07), in the Baltic (1807-08), and in the Peninsula (1808). In 1808, he accompanied Sir John Moore in his diplomatic missions to Sweden and Portugal. In December of the same year, he was promoted to the rank of major in de Roll's Swiss Regiment. He was eventually commissioned, in October 1809, to lead the foreign troops to a mission in Sicily, and, from there, to the Ionian Islands, then occupied by British forces under Brigadier General John Oswald. (Note: Under the terms of the 1807 Treaties of Tilsit, Russia ceded the Septinsular Republic to France. In 1809, the British defeated the French fleet off Zakynthos island and captured Cephalonia, Kythera, and Zakynthos, and, the following year, Lefkada.) He distinguished himself in the siege of Santa Maura, (Note: Lefkada, at the time of the siege, carried the name "Santa Maura" ("Sainte Maure" in French).) leading his troops to victory against the French garrison and the Albanian Regiment. His conduct was honourably mentioned in the issue of the London Gazette of 23 June 1810.

== Governor of Cephalonia ==
In 1810, de Bosset was appointed Military Commandant and Chief of the Government of the island of Cephalonia. The same year, archaeological excavations undertaken in the island at de Bosset's orders, unearthed at Mazarakata ancient burial places that were subsequently determined to be the biggest Mycenaean-period cemetery on Cephalonia, with its characteristic beehive tombs. (Note: The following decades, excavations in the island continued under the auspices of the Greek state, with numerous findings, until the latest one of 1990. See Argyros (2018).) Most of the findings were donated to the British Museum and the Musee cantonale d'archeologie at Neuchâtel.

In 1812, he ordered the construction of a bridge over the Koutavos lagoon that would connect the bay of Argostoli with Drapano and shorten the way to Lixouri and the north of the island. The governor proceeded with the construction against the strong opposition of the island's counsellors who feared that, in case of a peasant uprising against the gentry, the bridge would enable the peasants to easily march against and reach the homes of the wealthy inhabitants of the city and its landlords. After the construction was finished, in 1813, in its centre stood a small pyramid carrying the inscription "To The Glory of The British Nation 1813". It eventually became known as the De Bosset Bridge, and remains the largest stone bridge on a seawater body in the world. (Note: Devastated by the 1953 earthquake, the bridge was repaired but, from then on, used strictly by pedestrians.)

During his time as governor, de Bosset, an amateur numismatist and medalist, wrote an essay on the ancient medals discovered in Cephalonia and Ithaca.

On 4 June 1814, he was promoted to lieutenant colonel. While still a governor, he was briefly recalled to England and tasked by Earl Bathurst to organize the imposition of additional levies in Flanders and west of the Rhine, as well as the use of the additional state funds to strengthen the fortification and defence of these territories. His recommendations were approved in their entirety, and he was assigned to accompany the Duke of Wellington in his inspection of the fortifications across the Belgian border. In September 1814, he was recalled permanently to England. Upon the termination of his term as governor, Cephalonia's representatives presented him with a gold medal struck specially in his honour by Henri-Franois Brandt.

== Inspector General of the Ionian Islands' armed forces ==
After rejoining his regiment in Corfu and serving, in 1816, a stint as governor of the island of Zante, de Bosset was named, the same year, Inspector General of the Ionian islands' armed forces. In 1817, he personally undertook, as well, the command of the Parga fortress.

Britain had agreed to cede Parga to Ali Pasha, as a representative of the Sublime Porte, under certain specific conditions, mostly related to guarantees for the safety of Parga's inhabitants, since they had resisted for many years the Ottomans' attempts to conquer it. Despite Ali not meeting the obligations he had undertaken on behalf of the Porte, Lieutenant General Thomas Maitland, Lord High Commissioner of the Ionian Islands, was willing to cede Parga to the Albanian pasha, a development to which de Bosset strongly objected.

Order of the Bath ribbon bar

Royal Guelphic Order ribbon bar

The two officers clashed in public, causing a minor scandal that was reported in the English press. De Bosset was forced to resign his commission. Upon his return to England, in 1817, he undertook legal action against Maitland and published a pamphlet in which he stated his positions on the matter, refuting all accusations of insubordination. (Note: After the British departure and its handover to Ali Pasha, in 1819, Parga was completely abandoned by its inhabitants. Ali Pasha undertook a policy of bringing over Albanians from Chameria to repopulate the town. See Parga.)

In April 1818, he was named a Knight of the Royal Guelphic Order, having already been declared Commander of the Order of the Bath. (Note: These are the honours as given by de Bosset himself, whereas Jeanneret (1863) gives them as the Cross of the Guelphic Order and Knight of the Order of the Bath.)

== Life in England ==
While living in England, de Bosset married Fildesley Holmes, of South Kensington, in 1822.

He actively promoted to the London public the work of Swiss lens maker and optician Pierre-Louis Guinand, an acknowledged pioneer in the manufacture of optical glass for microscopes, telescopes, glasses and other optical instruments.

== Return home ==
He returned to Neuchâtel and established in 1827 a glove factory in Fleurier. After the decline of the lace industry since the introduction of machines for its manufacture, the need arose to replace that industry with a new one that did not require large workshops or expensive tools, and was within the reach of women. De Bosset believed he had identified one such endeavour as being the manufacture of gloves. Within a year after the founding of the glove factory, seventy workers were employed there and the future looked prosperous. However, as soon as watch making, with its great division and variability of parts, became accessible to women and they were able to earn more money from it than from making gloves, they all resigned from de Bosset's employment. He was forced to close the factory and then attempted in vain to compensate his friends and acquaintances who had invested in it.

In 1837, the British army gave de Bosset the rank of lieutenant general in retirement.

He committed suicide at his home in Neuchâtel on 15 March 1845.
