= Vathy, Ithaca =

Capital of Ithaca, Greece

Vathy Βαθύ
- Community
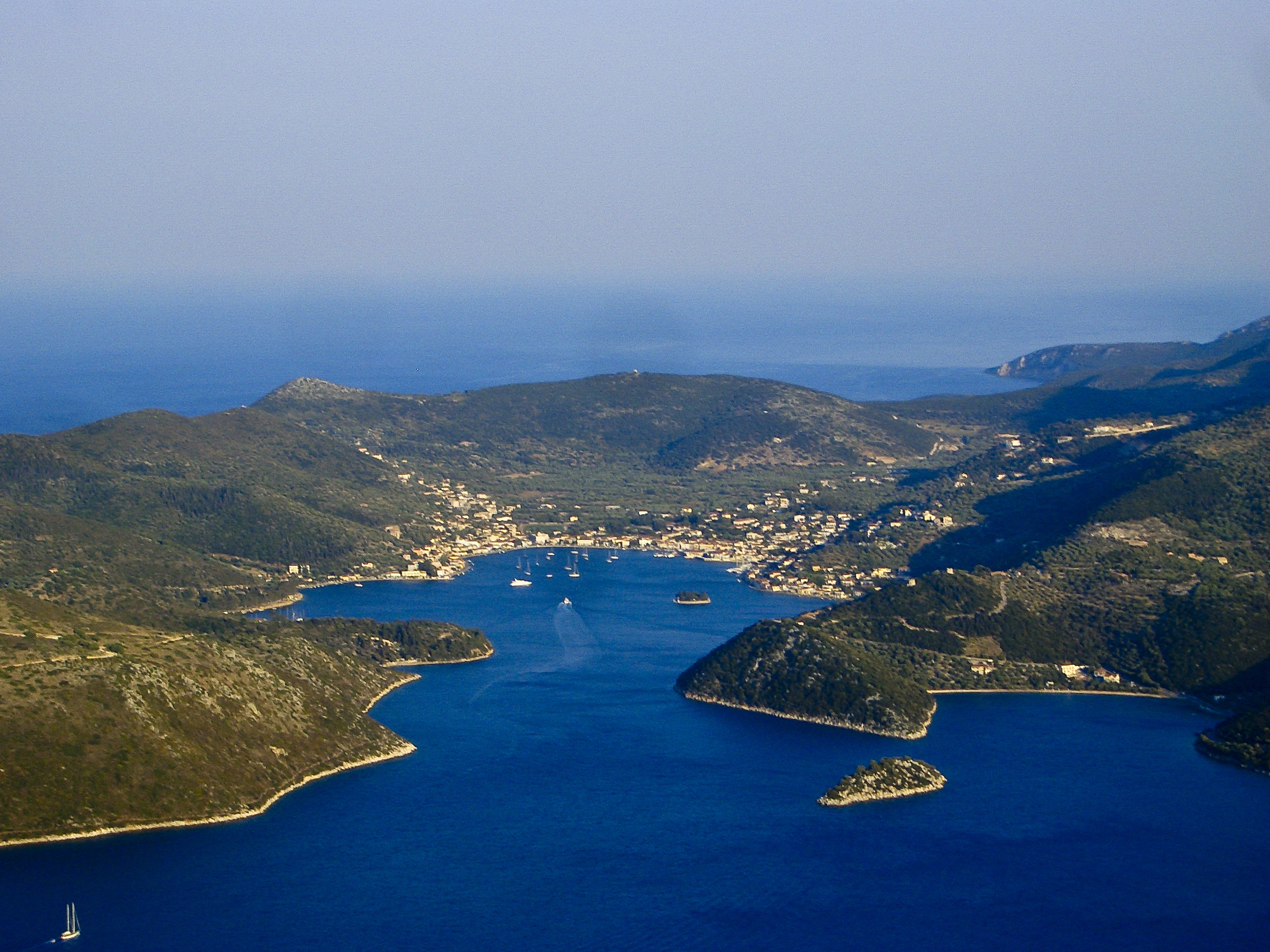
- A view to the bay of Vathy

- Location within Greece
- Coordinates: 38°21′53″N 20°43′13″E
- Country: Greece
- Administrative region: Ionian Islands
- Regional unit: Ithaca
- Municipality: Ithaca

Population (2021)
  - Community: 1,693
- Time zone: UTC+2 (EET)
  - Summer (DST): UTC+3 (EEST)
- Postal code: 28300

Vathy (Greek: Βαθύ) or Vathi is the largest settlement on the Greek Ionian island of Ithaca and the seat of the Ithaca regional unit. It is located in the southern part of the island, in a deep natural harbour. According to the 2021 census, it has a population of 1,693.

In the Middle Ages, Ionian islands were subject to frequent pirate raids, which forced inhabitants to build settlements inland. Vathy was only formed in the 16th century, during the late Venetian rule, when the families living uphill in the settlement of Palaiochora ('old town'), began moving down to Vathy. In 1807, the French built a fortress on the Loutsa hill at the port entrance. The dockyard at the port operated throughout the 19th century, and over 200 ships were built during the period. Wealth from shipbuilding, trade and fishing caused expansion of population and house construction. During the British rule in the 19th century, the population rose to about 5,000. However, in the 1920s the naval activity dwindled, and the economy of Vathy stagnated.

Vathy was devastated by the 1953 Ionian earthquake which left only a few buildings standing. Gradually, the buildings were rebuilt in the original Venetian style. A law was passed in 1978 protecting the architectural heritage of the town, mandating that style and colour of all repairs and new constructions must be preserved.

Islet of Lazareto at the entrance to the Bay of Vathy hosts the chapel dedicated to the Transfiguration of the Savior, built in 1668. Since 1560, the islet served as a 40-day quarantine station for ships entering the harbour.
