= Economy of Greece =

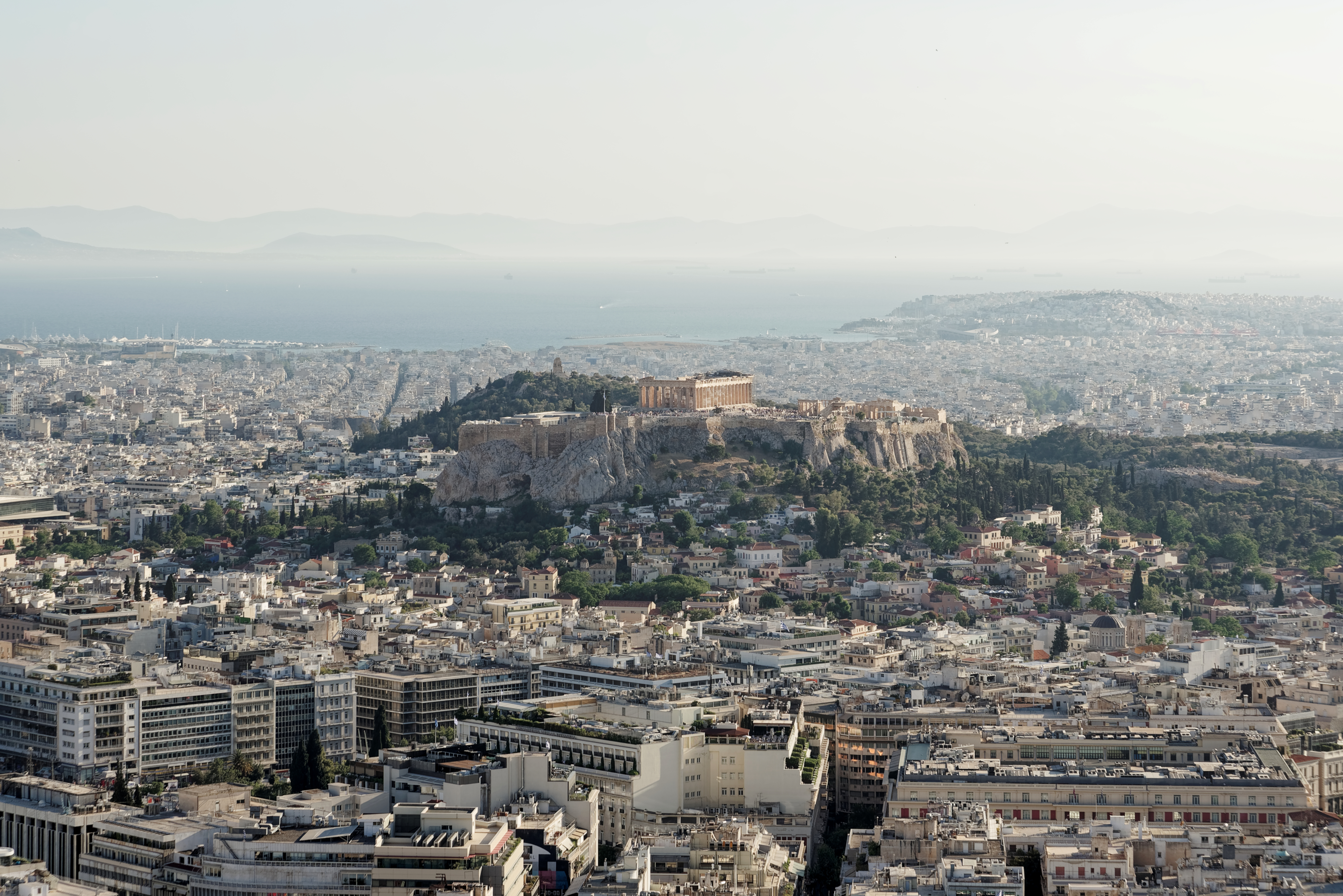
- Athens is the capital city and financial centre of Greece.
- Currency: Euro (EUR, €)
- Fiscal year: Calendar year
- Trade organisations: EU, WTO, OECD, BIS, BSEC
- Country group: Advanced economy; High-income economy

Statistics
- Population: ▼10,357,000 (2026f)
- GDP: ▲$304.627 billion (nominal, 2026f); ▲$490.550 billion (PPP, 2026f)
- GDP rank: 51st (nominal, 2026f); 54th (PPP, 2026f)
- GDP growth: 1.9% (Q2 2026 est.); 1.8% (2026f); 2.1% (2025)
- GDP per capita: ▲$29,413 (nominal, 2026f); ▲$47,365 (PPP, 2026f)
- GDP per capita rank: 44th (nominal, 2026f); 49th (PPP, 2026f)
- GDP per capita growth: 2.0% (real, 2025)
- GDP by sector: agriculture: 4.14%; industry: 17.65%; services: 78.21%; (2025)
- Inflation (CPI): ▲5.7% (October 2026); ▲4.2% (2026f)
- Population below national poverty line: ▲27.5% at risk of poverty or social exclusion (2025)
- Gini coefficient: ▼31.6 medium (2025)
- Human Development Index: ▲0.908 very high (2023) (34th); ▲0.825 very high (2023) (IHDI, 31st)
- Corruption Perceptions Index: ▲50 out of 100 points (2025, 56th)
- Labour force: ▼4,750,817 (September 2026); ▲71.0% employment rate (2025)
- Labour force by occupation: agriculture: 9.2%; industry: 16.3%; services: 74.4%; (2025)
- Unemployment: ▲7.6% (September 2026); ▼8% (2026f); ▲17.3% youth unemployment (under 25s; September 2026)
- Average gross salary: €1,565.67 / $1,784.86 monthly (2024)
- Average net salary: €1,225 / $1,396.5 monthly (2024)
- Main industries: Shipping (world's 1st by tonnage), Tourism, Petroleum refining, Food processing, Renewable energy, Aluminium and metal products, Chemicals, Pharmaceuticals, Machinery (including electric and electronic equipment and transport equipment), ICT services, mining (2025)

External
- Exports: ▼€48.6766 billion (−2.7%, 2025)
- Export goods: Refined petroleum 26.2%; Food and beverages 18.6%; Manufactured goods 15.5%; Chemicals (incl. medicines) 13.0%; Machinery and transport equipment 9.9%; Aluminium and other metals 7.2%; (2024)
- Main export partners: Italy 9.1%; Germany 7.8%; Cyprus 6.8%; Bulgaria 6.5%; United States 4.9%; Romania 4.3%; United Kingdom 4.0%; France 3.2%; Turkey 2.8%; Gibraltar 2.2%; (2025)
- Imports: ▼€82.5960 billion (−3.5%, 2025)
- Import goods: Mineral fuels, lubricants, etc. 26.5%; Machinery and transport equipment 17.2%; Chemicals and related products 14.5%; Food and live animals 11.8%; Manufactured goods 10.5%; Electrical, electronic equipment 7.6%; Motor vehicles and parts 5.2%; (2024)
- Main import partners: Germany 11.5%; Italy 9.0%; China 7.9%; Netherlands 6.2%; France 5.0%; Spain 4.2%; Belgium 2.9%; United States 2.9%; Russia 1.7%; South Korea 0.6%; (2025)
- FDI stock: ▲$68.249 billion (2024)
- Current account: ▼ −$20.113 billion (2026f); ▼ −6.6% of GDP (2026f)
- Gross external debt: ▲€590.366 billion (Q4 2025)

Public finance
- Government debt: €362.995 billion (▼145.4% of GDP, 2025 est.); €356.740 billion (▼136.0% of GDP, 2026f)
- Budget balance: €4.935 billion (▲2.0% of GDP, 2025 est.)
- Revenue: €124.282 billion (▲49.77% of GDP, 2025 est.)
- Spending: €119.347 billion (▼47.79% of GDP, 2025 est.)
- Economic aid: €20.4 billion from European Structural and Investment Funds (2007–2013); €20.38 billion from European Structural and Investment Funds (2014–2020)
- Credit rating: DBRS: BBB; Trend: Positive; Fitch: BBB; Outlook: Stable; Moody's: Baa3; Outlook: Positive; R&I: BBB; Outlook: Positive; S&P: BBB; AAA (T&C Assessment); Outlook: Stable; Scope: BBB+; Outlook: Stable

Greece is a developed country with a mixed economy. The Greek economy is the 51st-largest by nominal gross domestic product (GDP) and 54th-largest by purchasing power parity (PPP). It is the 16th-largest economy in the European Union and eleventh largest in the eurozone. Greece is a welfare state and ranks relatively highly among OECD nations in terms of social spending, which stood at 23.7% of GDP in 2024. Its debt-to-GDP ratio stood at 145.4% in 2025, the highest in the EU. The economy is based on the service (78%), industrial (18%) and agricultural (4%) sectors.

The Greek economy was devastated by World War II (1939–1945), but expanded rapidly from 1950 to 1980 in what is commonly known as the Greek economic miracle. Greece also enjoyed a sustained period of growth rates above the EU average from the mid-1990s to the mid-2000s, peaking at 6.4% in 2006. The subsequent Great Recession and Greek government-debt crisis, a central focus of the wider eurozone crisis, plunged the economy into a sharp downturn in the late 2000s and early 2010s. The tourism boom of recent years has helped drive a strong recovery, with Greece setting new records in arrivals (38 million) and revenue (€23.6 billion) in 2025 as one of the most visited countries in the world.

Significant Greek industries include tourism and shipping. The Greek merchant navy is the largest in the world, with Greek-owned vessels accounting for 21% of global deadweight tonnage as of 2021; the total capacity of the Greek-owned fleet has increased by 45.8% compared to 2014. Greece has the largest economy in Southeast Europe and contributes extensively to regional investment. Greece has free trade agreements with many nations and is a founding member of the OECD (1961), the European single market (1993) and the World Trade Organization (1995), among others.

== History ==
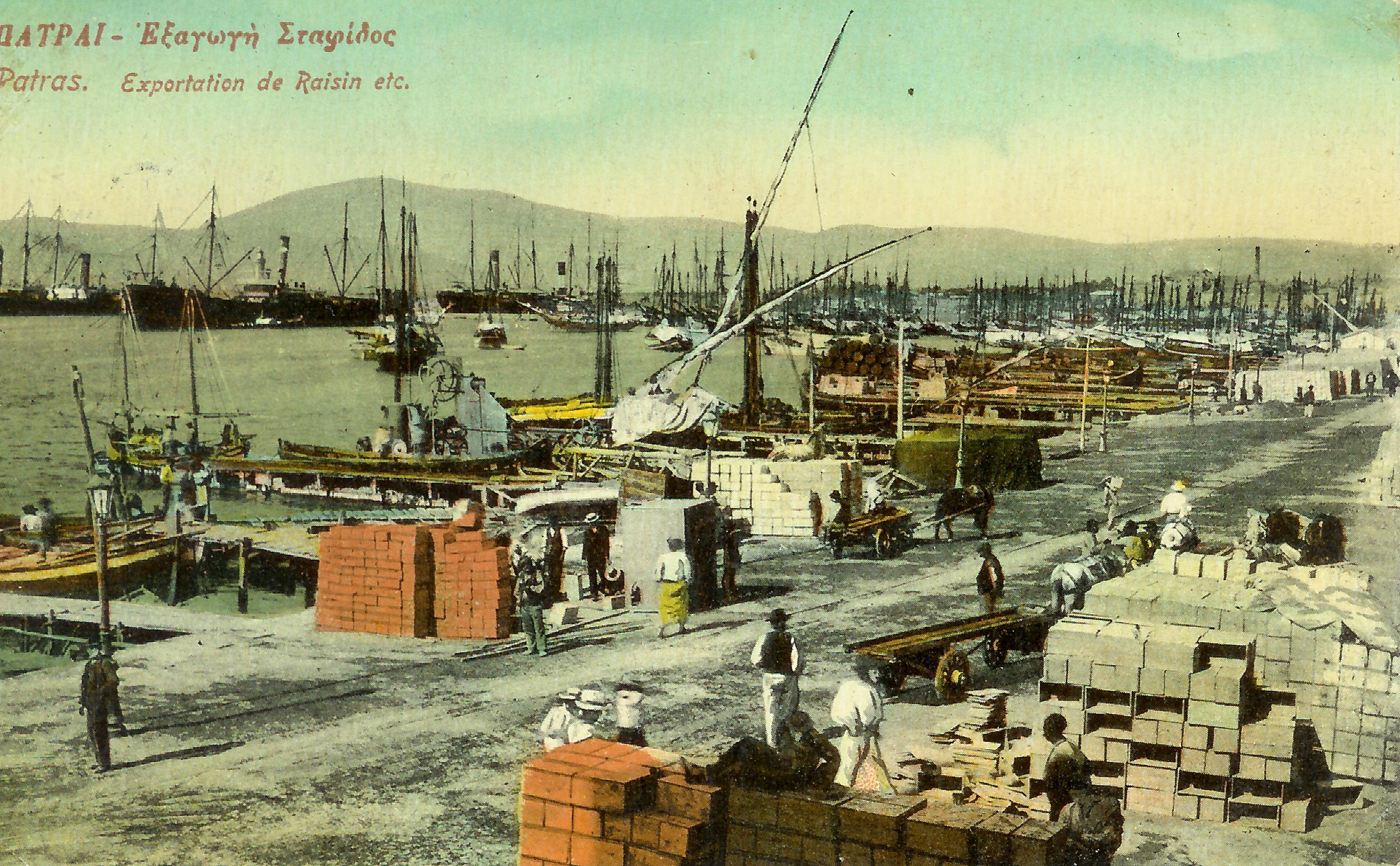
Export of raisin from the port of Patras, late 19th century

Historical GDP per capita development

The evolution of the Greek economy during the 19th century (a period that transformed a large part of the world because of the Industrial Revolution) has been little researched. Recent research from 2006 examines the gradual development of industry and further development of shipping in a predominantly agricultural economy, calculating an average rate of per capita GDP growth between 1833 and 1911 that was only slightly lower than that of the other Western European nations. Industrial activity, (including heavy industry like shipbuilding) was evident, mainly in Ermoupolis and Piraeus. Nonetheless, Greece faced economic hardships and defaulted on its external loans in 1843, 1860 and 1893.

Other studies support the above view on the general trends in the economy, providing comparative measures of standard of living. The per capita income (in purchasing power terms) of Greece was 65% that of France in 1850, 56% in 1890, 62% in 1938, 75% in 1980,72% in 2000, 87% in 2008 and 77% in 2010. The GDP per capita of Greece( in purchasing power terms) fell to 62% of the level of France in 2019, but has since risen to 71% in 2025.

During World War II, Greece experienced one of history's most extreme hyperinflation crises during the Axis occupation, peaking in November 1944 with monthly rates reaching roughly 13,800 percent.

The country's post-World War II development has largely been connected with the Greek economic miracle. During that period, Greece saw growth rates second only to those of Japan, while ranking first in Europe in terms of GDP growth. It is indicative that between 1960 and 1973 the Greek economy grew by an average of 7.7%, in contrast to 4.7% for the EU15 and 4.9% for the OECD. Also during that period, exports grew by an average annual rate of 12.6%.

=== Eurozone entry ===
Average Public Debt % of GDP, 1909–2008 (Note: 100-year period until the eve of the Greek debt crisis)
Country	Debt (%)
United Kingdom	104.7%
Belgium	86.0%
Italy	76.0%
Canada	71.0%
France	62.6%
Greece	60.2%
United States	47.1%
Germany	32.1%

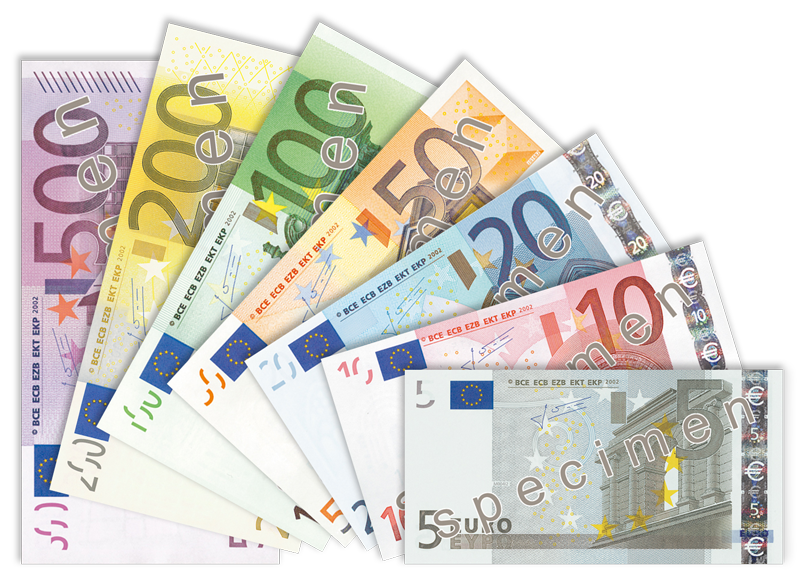
Greece entered the Eurozone in 2001

Greece was accepted into the Economic and Monetary Union of the European Union by the European Council on 19 June 2000, based on a number of criteria (inflation rate, budget deficit, public debt, long-term interest rates, exchange rate) using 1999 as the reference year. After an audit commissioned by the incoming New Democracy government in 2004, Eurostat revealed that the statistics for the budget deficit had been under-reported. However, even after all corrections that followed, the reference year budget deficit did not exceed the allowable upper limit (3%) according to the Eurostat accounting method in force at the time of application, and thus Greece had still met all critiera for Eurozone entry (details given below). (Note: After revised adjustments, Greece's reference year budget deficit was 3.07% even according to the more recent accounting method, which was smaller than that of other EU countries at the moment of application for joining Euro (when also calculated with the more recent accounting method), like France's and Portugal's budget deficits of 3.3% and 3.4%, respectively.)

Most of the differences in the revised budget deficit numbers were due to a temporary change of accounting practices by the new government, i.e., recording expenses when military material was ordered rather than received. However, it was the retroactive application of ESA95 methodology (applied since 2000) by Eurostat, that finally raised the reference year (1999) budget deficit to 3.38% of GDP, thus exceeding the 3% limit. This led to claims that Greece (similar claims have been made about other European countries like Italy) had not actually met all five accession criteria, and the common perception that Greece entered the Eurozone through "falsified" deficit numbers.

In the 2005 OECD report for Greece, it was clearly stated that "the impact of new accounting rules on the fiscal figures for the years 1997 to 1999 ranged from 0.7 to 1 percentage point of GDP; this retroactive change of methodology was responsible for the revised deficit exceeding 3% in 1999, the year of [Greece's] EMU membership qualification". The above led the Greek minister of finance to clarify that the 1999 budget deficit was below the prescribed 3% limit when calculated with the ESA79 methodology in force at the time of Greece's application, and thus the criteria had been met.

The original accounting practice for military expenses was later restored in line with Eurostat recommendations, theoretically lowering even the ESA95-calculated 1999 Greek budget deficit to below 3% (an official Eurostat calculation is still pending for 1999).

An error sometimes made is the confusion of discussion regarding Greece's Eurozone entry with the controversy regarding usage of derivatives' deals with U.S. Banks by Greece and other Eurozone countries to artificially reduce their reported budget deficits. A currency swap arranged with Goldman Sachs allowed Greece to "hide" 2.8 billion Euros of debt, however, this affected deficit values after 2001 (when Greece had already been admitted into the Eurozone) and is not related to Greece's Eurozone entry.

A study of the period 1999–2009 by forensic accountants has found that data submitted to Eurostat by Greece, among other countries, had a statistical distribution indicative of manipulation; "Greece with a mean value of 17.74, shows the largest deviation from Benford's law among the members of the eurozone, followed by Belgium with a value of 17.21 and Austria with a value of 15.25".

=== 2010–2018 government debt crisis ===
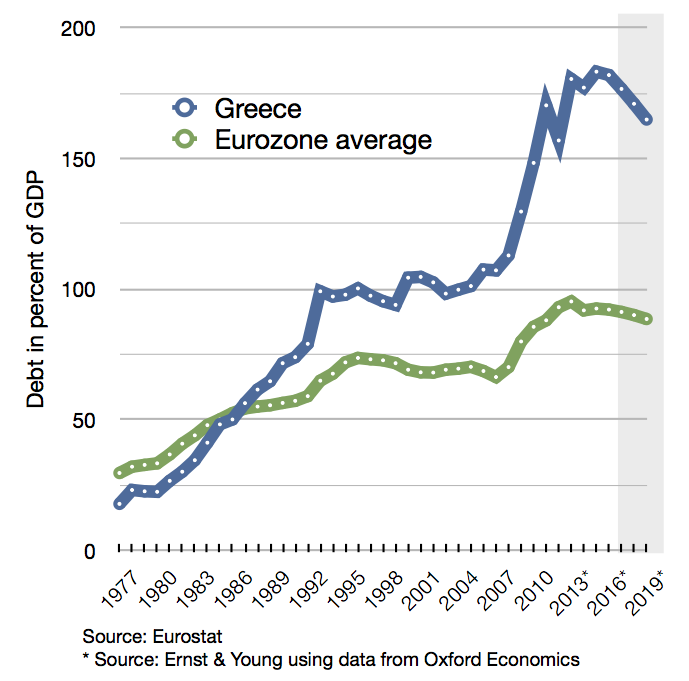
Greece's debt percentage since 1977, compared to the average of the Eurozone

==== Historical Debt ====
Greece, like other European nations, had faced debt crises in the 19th century, as well as a similar crisis in 1932 during the Great Depression. In general, however, during the 20th century it enjoyed one of the highest GDP growth rates on the planet (for a quarter century from the early 1950s to mid 1970s, second in the world after Japan). Average Greek government debt-to-GDP for the entire century before the crisis (1909–2008) was lower than that for the UK, Canada, or France, while for the 30-year period (1952–1981) until entrance into the European Economic Community, the Greek government debt-to-GDP ratio averaged only 19.8%.

Between 1981 and 1993 Greece's government debt-to-GDP ratio steadily rose, surpassing the average of what is today the Eurozone in the mid-1980s (see chart right). For the next 15 years, from 1993 to 2007 (i.e., before the 2008 financial crisis), Greece's government debt-to-GDP ratio remained roughly unchanged (the value was not affected by the 2004 Athens Olympics), averaging 102% - a value lower than that for Italy (107%) and Belgium (110%) during the same 15-year period, and comparable to that for the U.S. or the OECD average in 2017.

During the latter period, the country's annual budget deficit usually exceeded 3% of GDP, but its effect on the debt-to-GDP ratio was counterbalanced by high GDP growth rates. The debt-to-GDP values for 2006 and 2007 (about 105%) were established after audits resulted in corrections according to Eurostat methodology, of up to 10 percentage points for the particular years (as well as similar corrections for the years 2008 and 2009). These corrections, although altering the debt level by a maximum of about 10%, resulted in a popular notion that "Greece was previously hiding its debt".

==== Evolution of the debt crisis ====
The Greek crisis was triggered by the turmoil of the Great Recession, which led the budget deficits of several Western nations to reach or exceed 10% of GDP. In Greece's case, the high budget deficit (which, after several corrections, was revealed that it had been allowed to reach 10.2% and 15.1% of GDP in 2008 and 2009, respectively) was coupled with a high public debt to GDP ratio (which, until then, was relatively stable for several years, at just above 100% of GDP - as calculated after all corrections). Thus, the country appeared to lose control of its public debt to GDP ratio, which already reached 127% of GDP in 2009. In addition, being a member of the Eurozone, the country had essentially no autonomous monetary policy flexibility. Finally, there was an effect of controversies about Greek statistics (due the aforementioned drastic budget deficit revisions which led to an increase in the calculated value of the Greek public debt by about 10%, i.e., a public debt to GDP of about 100% until 2007), while there have been arguments about a possible effect of media reports. Consequently, Greece was "punished" by the markets which increased borrowing rates, making it impossible for the country to finance its debt since early 2010, exacerbating the eurozone crisis.

The Greek economy faced its most severe crisis since the restoration of democracy in 1974 as the Greek government revised its deficit forecasts from 3.7% in early 2009 and 6% in September 2009 to 12.7% of gross domestic product (GDP) in October 2009.

The aforementioned budget deficit and debt revisions were connected with findings that, through the assistance of Goldman Sachs, JPMorgan Chase and numerous other banks, financial products were developed which enabled the governments of Greece, Italy, and many other European countries to hide parts of their borrowing. Dozens of similar agreements were concluded across Europe whereby banks supplied cash in advance in exchange for future payments by the governments involved; in turn, the liabilities of the involved countries were "kept off the books".

According to Der Spiegel, credits given to European governments were disguised as "swaps" and consequently did not get registered as debt because Eurostat at the time ignored statistics involving financial derivatives. A German derivatives dealer had commented to Der Spiegel that "The Maastricht rules can be circumvented quite legally through swaps," and "In previous years, Italy used a similar trick to mask its true debt with the help of a different US bank." These conditions had enabled Greek as well as many other European governments to spend beyond their means, while meeting the deficit targets of the European Union and the monetary union guidelines. In May 2010, the Greek government deficit was again revised and estimated to be 13.6% which was among the highest relative to GDP, with Iceland in first place at 15.7% and the United Kingdom third with 12.6%. Public debt was forecast, according to some estimates, to hit 120% of GDP during 2010.

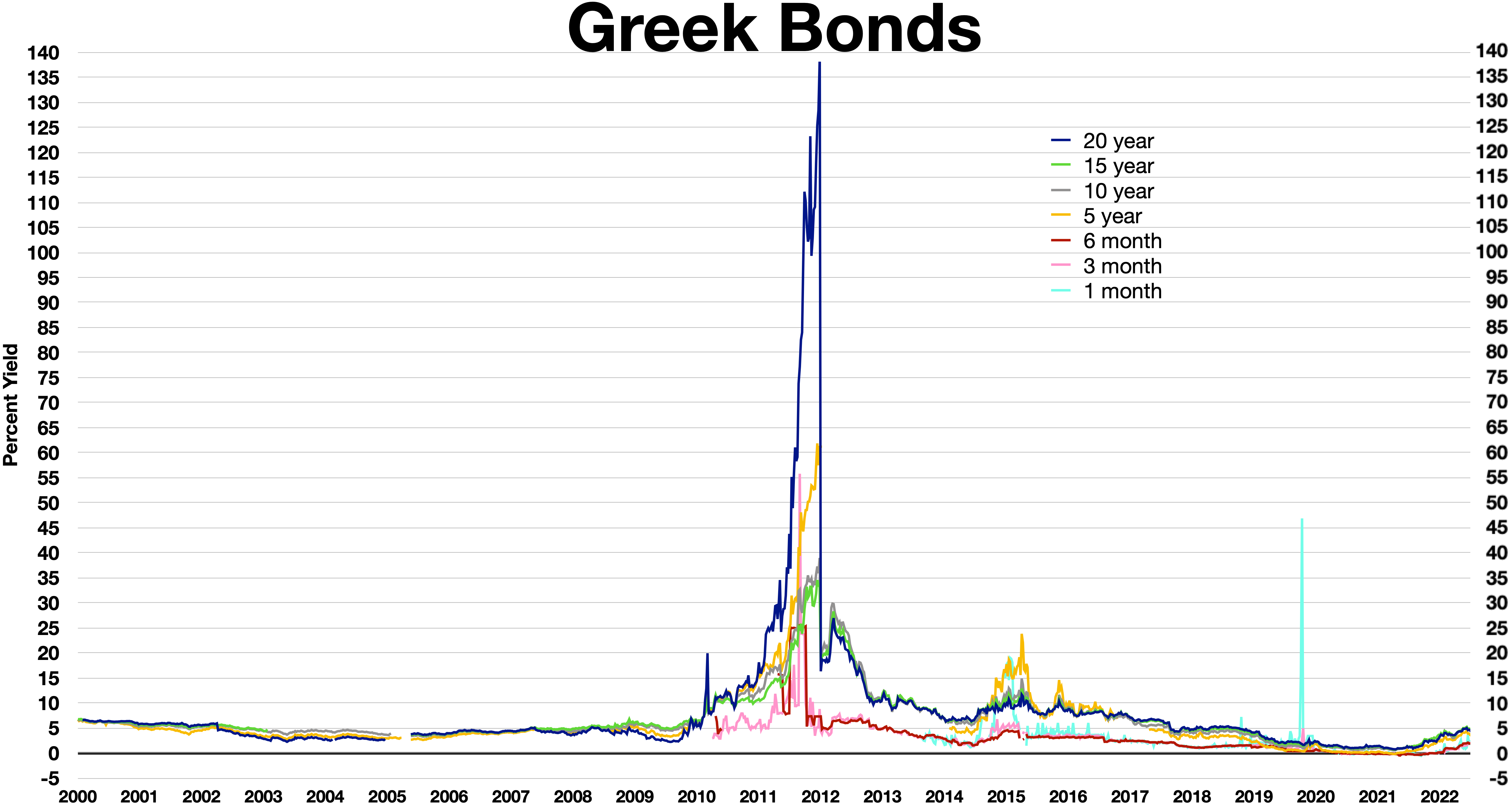
Greek bonds 20 year 15 year 10 year 5 year 1 year 3 month 1 month

As a consequence, there was a crisis in international confidence in Greece's ability to repay its sovereign debt, as reflected by the rise of the country's borrowing rates (although their slow rise – the 10-year government bond yield only exceeded 7% in April 2010 – coinciding with a large number of negative articles, has led to arguments about the role of international news media in the evolution of the crisis). In order to avert a default (as high borrowing rates effectively prohibited access to the markets), in May 2010 the other Eurozone countries and the IMF agreed to a "rescue package" which involved giving Greece an immediate €45 billion in bail-out loans, with more funds to follow, totaling €110 billion. In order to secure the funding, Greece was required to adopt harsh austerity measures to bring its deficit under control. Their implementation was to be monitored and evaluated by the European Commission, the European Central Bank, and the IMF.

The 2008 financial crisis – particularly the austerity package put forth by the EU and the IMF – was met with anger by the Greek public, leading to riots and social unrest, while there have been theories about the effect of international media. Despite - others say because of - the long range of austerity measures, the government deficit has not been reduced accordingly, mainly, according to many economists, because of the subsequent recession.

Public sector workers came out on strike in order to resist job cuts and reductions to salaries as the government promised that a large scale privatisation programme would be accelerated. Immigrants were sometimes treated as scapegoats for economic problems by far-right extremists.

In 2013, Greece became the first developed market whose stock market was reclassified as an emerging market by different financial rating companies, only starting to be reclassified back as a developed market, first by FTSE Russell in October 2025, followed by other rating companies.

By July 2014 there were still anger and protests about the austerity measures, with a 24-hour strike among government workers timed to coincide with an audit by inspectors from the International Monetary Fund, the European Union and European Central Bank in advance of a decision on a second bailout of one billion euros ($1.36 billion), due in late July.

Greece exited its six-year recession in the second quarter of 2014, but the challenges of securing political stability and debt sustainability remained.

A third bailout was agreed in July 2015, after a confrontation with the newly elected leftist government of Alexis Tsipras. In June 2017, news reports indicated that the "crushing debt burden" had not been alleviated and that Greece was at the risk of defaulting on some payments. The International Monetary Fund stated that the country should be able to borrow again "in due course". At the time, the Euro zone gave Greece another credit of $9.5-billion, $8.5 billion of loans and brief details of a possible debt relief with the assistance of the IMF. On 13 July, the Greek government sent a letter of intent to the IMF with 21 commitments it promised to meet by June 2018. They included changes in labour laws, a plan to cap public sector work contracts, to transform temporary contracts into permanent agreements and to recalculate pension payments to reduce spending on social security.

Greece's bailouts successfully ended (as declared) on 20 August 2018.

In June 2026, Greece repaid a further €6.9 billions from its first bailout package ahead of schedule as part of a broader effort to improve its financial standing and reduce debt. This follows previous earlier repayments to EU creditors, as well as a full repayment of Greece’s loans to the International Monetary Fund two years ahead of schedule in 2022. The early debt repayments were seen as part of the country's remarkable recovery following the end of the crisis in 2018, further evidenced by dramatically reduced borrowing costs for the country, with its benchmark 10-year government bond yields falling below Italy's on November 8, 2019 and France's on November 29, 2024.

As a result of its improved finances, Greece is expected to have a lower debt-to-GDP ratio than Italy by the end of 2026, three years earlier than previously forecast. Noting that Greece was recording the fastest debt reduction in the world, the finance minister and Eurogroup president Kyriakos Pierrakakis said that the government aimed to reduce the debt burden below 120% of GDP by 2029.

==== Effects of the bailout programmes on the debt crisis ====
There was a 25% drop in Greece's GDP, connected with the bailout programmes. This had a critical effect: the Debt-to-GDP ratio, the key factor defining the severity of the crisis, would jump from its 2009 level of 127% to about 170%, solely due to the GDP drop (i.e., for the same Debt). Such a level is considered unsustainable. Reports show that, for government debt, the threshold for unhealthy Debt-to-GDPT ratio is around 85%. In a 2013 report, the IMF admitted that it had underestimated the effects of so extensive tax hikes and budget cuts on the country's GDP and issued an informal apology. In 2009, real GDP growth rates hit −4.1% with −5.7% in 2010, −9.9% in 2011, −8.3% in 2012 and −2.3% in 2013. In 2011, the country's government debt reached €356 billion (172% of nominal GDP). After negotiating the biggest debt restructuring in history with the private sector, which sustained losses in the order of €100 billion for private bond investors, Greece reduced its sovereign debt burden to €280 billion (137% of GDP) in the first quarter of 2012. Greece achieved a real GDP growth rate of 0.8% in 2014—after five consecutive years of economic decline—but the economy contracted by 0.2% in 2015 and recorded zero growth in 2016. The country returned to modest growth rates of 1.5% in 2017, 2.1% in 2018 and 2.3% in 2019.

=== COVID-19 recession ===
The COVID-19 pandemic had a severe impact on all sectors of the economy, and tourism in particular. As a result, GDP contracted by 9.2% in 2020 during the COVID-19 recession. In June 2021, the European Commission agreed to disburse approximately €30 billion in COVID-related economic aid (€12 billion in loans and €18 billion in grants).

=== Post-COVID recovery ===
Greece has recovered significantly since the early 2020s, approaching its pre-crisis levels of economic output with growth rates well above the eurozone average: 8.7% in 2021, 5.5% in 2022, 2.0% in 2023 and 2.1% in 2024 and 2025. On 20 August 2022, Greece formally exited the EU's "enhanced surveillance framework", which had been in place since the conclusion of the third bailout programme exactly four years earlier. On 2 December 2022, Berlin-based credit rating agency Scope assigned a positive outlook to Greece's BB+ rating, presaging the country's return to investment grade. On 31 July 2023, Greece's investment-grade status was restored by Japanese credit rating agency R&I. Scope, DBRS, S&P and Fitch followed suit on 4 August, 8 September, 20 October and 1 December 2023 respectively, but Moody's delayed doing so until 14 March 2025. The Economist ranked Greece the world's top economic performer for 2022 and 2023, citing significant improvements in five key economic and financial indicators.

== Strengths and weaknesses ==
Greece enjoys a high standard of living and very high Human Development Index,being rank 34th in the world (with a score of 0.908). However, the severe recession of recent years saw GDP per capita fall from 94% of the EU average in 2009 to 67% between 2017 and 2019., recovering slightly to 68% of the EU average by 2025. During the same period, Actual Individual Consumption (AIC) per capita fell from 104% to 78% of the EU average., standing at roughly 79%–80% by the mid-2020s.

Greece's main industries are tourism, shipping, industrial products, food and tobacco processing, textiles, chemicals, metal products, mining and petroleum. Greece's GDP growth has also, as an average, since the early 1990s been higher than the EU average. However, the Greek economy continues to face significant problems, including high unemployment levels, inefficient public sector bureaucracy, tax evasion, corruption and low global competitiveness.

Greece is ranked 56th in the world, and 21st among EU member states, on the Corruption Perceptions Index. Thus, it has roughly returned to its ranking prior to the 2010–2018 debt crisis. However, Greece rose to 75th globally in the 2026 Index of Economic Freedom (up from 113th in the late 2010s), while remaining among the lower-ranked EU economies in international competitiveness assessments.

Greece — Historical GDP Growth
Annual GDP growth rates of the Greek economy between 1961 and 2010.

After fourteen consecutive years of economic growth, Greece went into recession in 2008. By the end of 2009, the Greek economy faced the highest budget deficit and government debt-to-GDP ratio in the EU. After several upward revisions, the 2009 budget deficit is now estimated at 15.7% of GDP. This, combined with rapidly rising debt levels (127.9% of GDP in 2009) led to a precipitous increase in borrowing costs, effectively shutting Greece out of the global financial markets and resulting in a severe economic crisis.

Greece was accused of trying to cover up the extent of its massive budget deficit during the 2008 financial crisis. The allegation was prompted by the massive revision of the 2009 budget deficit forecast by the new PASOK government elected in October 2009, from "6–8%" (estimated by the previous New Democracy government) to 12.7% (later revised to 15.7%). However, the accuracy of the revised figures has also been questioned, and in February 2012 the Hellenic Parliament voted in favor of an official investigation following accusations by a former member of the Hellenic Statistical Authority that the deficit had been artificially inflated in order to justify harsher austerity measures.

Average GDP Growth by Era
Era	Growth
1961–1970	+8.44%
1971–1980	+4.70%
1981–1990	+0.70%
1991–2000	+2.36%
2001–2007	+4.11%
2008–2011	−4.80%
2012–2015	−2.52%
2016–2019	+1.05%
2020–2022	+1.78%
2023–2026	+2.01%

The Greek labor force, which amount around 4.75 million workers, average 1,874 hours of work per worker annually in 2025, is ranked fourth-highest among OECD countries, after Mexico, South Korea and Chile. The Groningen Growth & Development Centre has published a poll revealing that between 1995 and 2005, Greece was the country whose workers have the most hours/year work among European nations; Greeks worked an average of 1,900 hours per year, followed by Spaniards (average of 1,800 hours/year).

As a result of the ongoing economic crisis, industrial production in the country went down by 8% between March 2010 and March 2011, The volume of building activity saw a reduction of 73% in 2010. Additionally, the turnover in retail sales saw a decline of 9% between February 2010 and February 2011.

Between 2008 and 2013 unemployment skyrocketed, from a generational low of 7.2% in the second and third quarters of 2008 to a high of 27.9% in June 2013, leaving over a million jobless. Youth unemployment peaked at 64.9% in May 2013. Unemployment figures have steadily improved in recent years, with the overall rate falling to 7.4% in August 2026 and youth unemployment dropping to 14.3% in December 2025. Male and female unemployment stood at 5.2% and 10.5% in September 2026, the thirteenth-lowest and second-highest in the European Union respectively.

== Primary sector ==
=== Agriculture and fishery ===
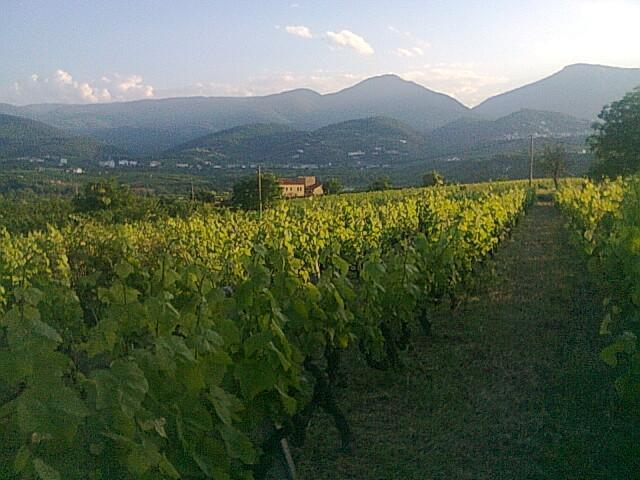
A vineyard in Naoussa, central Macedonia

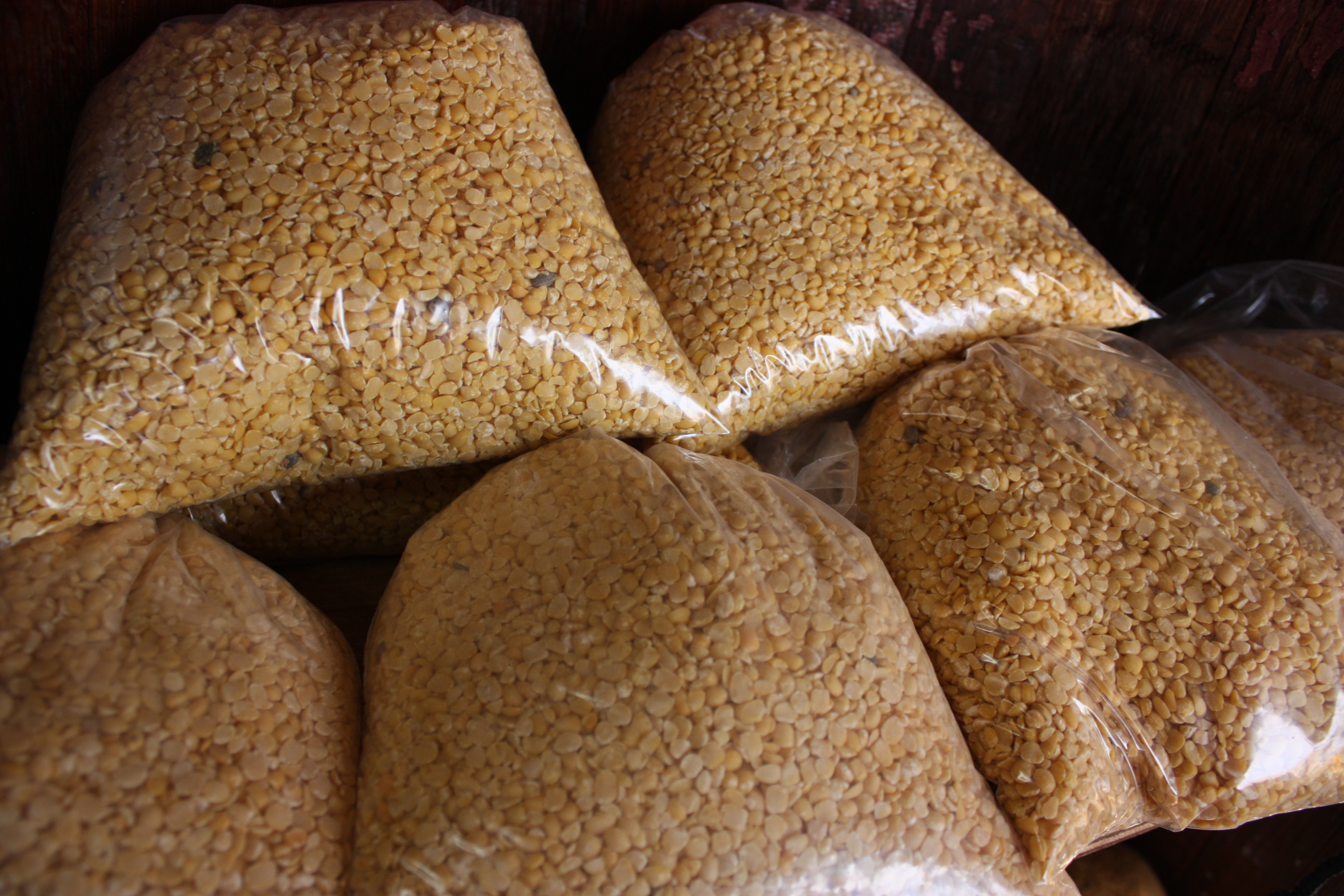
Sacks with Fava Santorinis

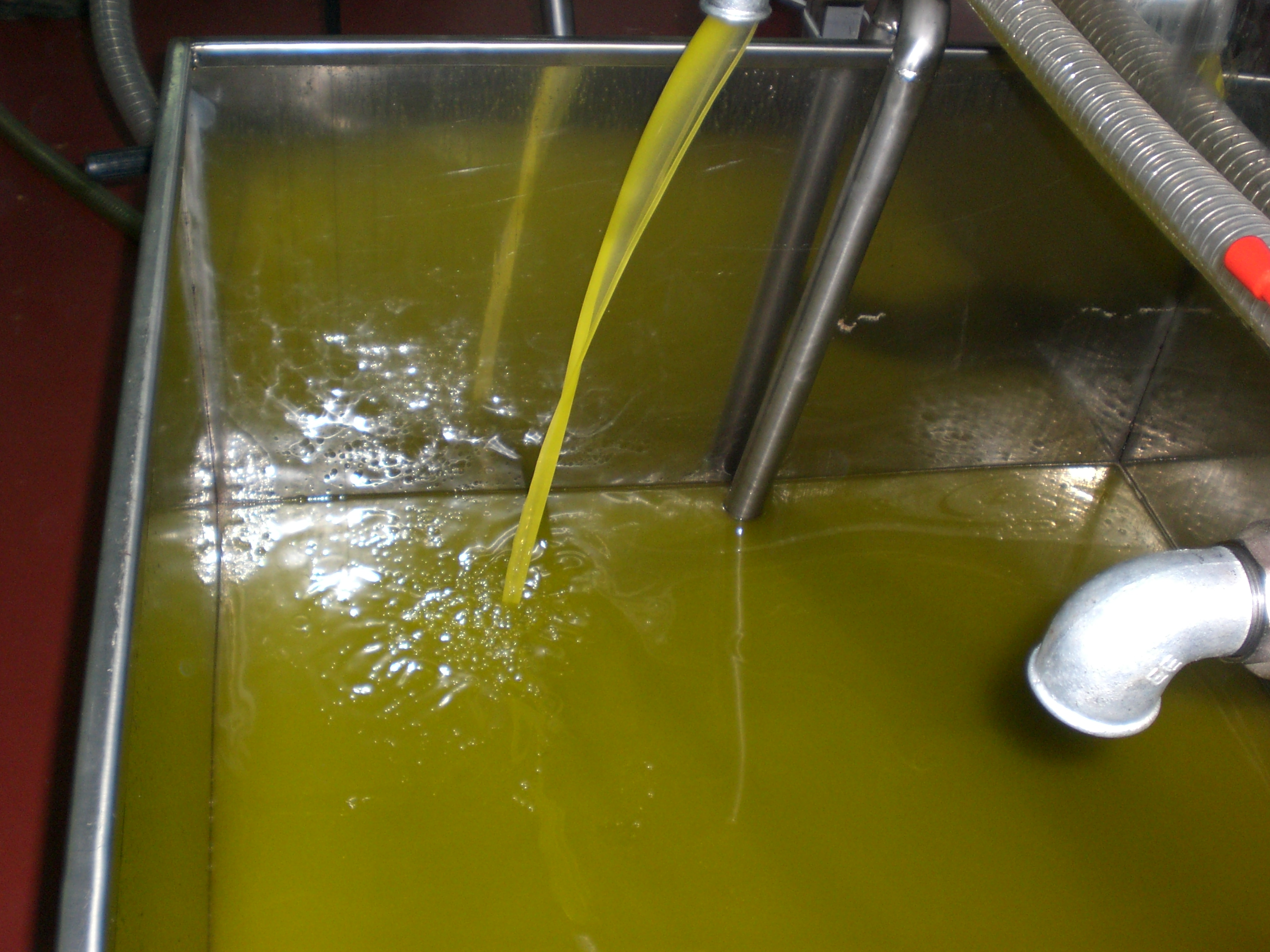
Olive oil production

In 2010, Greece was the European Union's largest producer of cotton (183,800 tons) and pistachios (8,000 tons) and ranked second in the production of rice (229,500 tons) and olives (147,500 tons), third in the production of figs (11,000 tons) and almonds (44,000 tons), tomatoes (1,400,000 tons) and watermelons (578,400 tons) and fourth in the production of tobacco (22,000 tons). Agriculture contributes 4.1% of GDP and employs 9.2% of the labor force.

Greece is a major beneficiary of the Common Agricultural Policy of the European Union. As a result of the country's entry to the European Community, much of its agricultural infrastructure has been upgraded and agricultural output increased. Between 2000 and 2007 organic farming in Greece increased by 885%, the highest change percentage in the EU.

In 2007, Greece accounted for 19% of the EU's fishing haul in the Mediterranean Sea, ranked third with 85,493 tons, and ranked first in the number of fishing vessels in the Mediterranean between European Union members. Additionally, the country ranked 11th in the EU in total quantity of fish caught, with 87,461 tons.

In September 2023, the main agricultural production was severely affected by a deadly flood in the Thessaly region, with estimated losses of 3.7 billion.

== Secondary sector ==
=== Industry ===
Industrial activity was evident in Greece, since at least the second half of the 19th century (including heavy industry such as shipbuilding), mainly centered in Ermoupolis and Piraeus. Manufacturing output increased significantly during the period of Greece's rapid economic growth (1950-1973), followed by a sharp decline after 1980 when services, as in other parts of the world, rapidly replaced manufacturing. The value added by the manufacturing sector as a percentage of GDP in Greece has remained lower than in most European countries (see Table)

Manufacturing Value Added (% of GDP, 2025)
Country	% of GDP
Germany	17.61%
Italy	15.00%
Spain	10.60%
Netherlands	10.08%
France	9.49%
Greece	9.08%
United Kingdom	7.68%

In 2024 the main sectors (in terms of value of manufactured products) of manufacturing in Greece were refined petroleum products (29.32%), food products (22.21%), basic metals (10.03%), machinery, including electric and electronic equipment and transport equipment (5.28%), chemicals (4.78%) and pharmaceuticals (4.12%).

Between 2005 and 2011, Greece has had the highest percentage increase in industrial output compared to 2005 levels out of all European Union members, with an increase of 6%. Eurostat statistics show that the industrial sector was hit by the Greek government-debt crisis throughout 2009 and 2010, with domestic output decreasing by 5.8% and industrial production in general by 13.4%. Currently, Greece is ranked third in the European Union in the production of marble (over 920,000 tons), after Italy and Spain.

Between 1999 and 2008, the volume of retail trade in Greece increased by an average of 4.4% per year (a total increase of 44%), while it decreased by 11.3% in 2009. The only sector that did not see negative growth in 2009 was administration and services, with a marginal growth of 2.0%.

In 2009, Greece's labor productivity was 98% that of the EU average, but its productivity-per-hour-worked was 74% that the Eurozone average. The largest industrial employer in the country (in 2007) was the manufacturing industry (407,000 people), followed by the construction industry (305,000) and mining (14,000).

Greece has a significant shipbuilding and ship maintenance industry. The six shipyards around the port of Piraeus are among the largest in Europe. In recent years, Greece has become a leader in the construction and maintenance of luxury yachts.

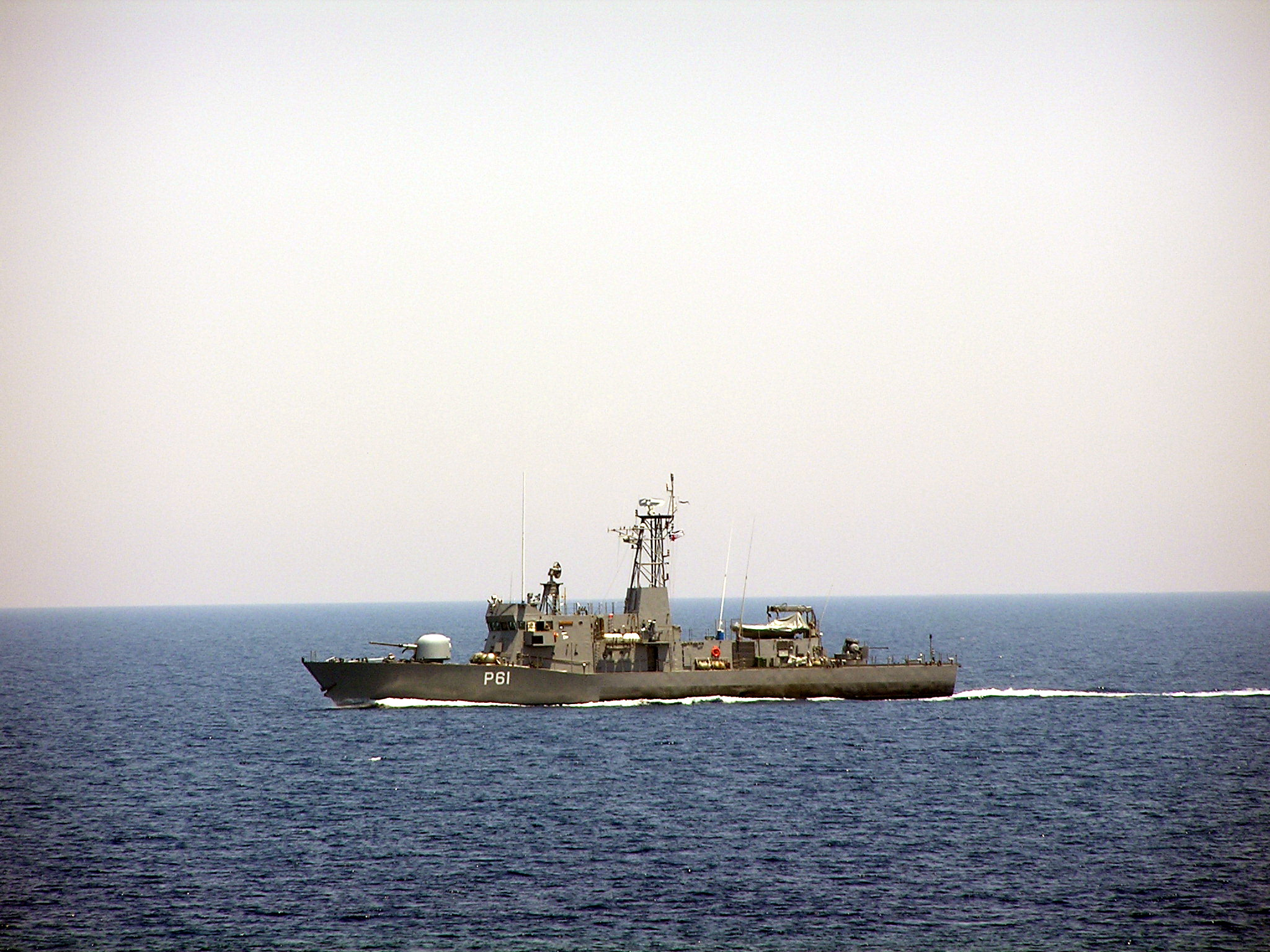
HSY-55-class gunboat Polemistis, built by Hellenic Shipyards Co. for the Hellenic Navy

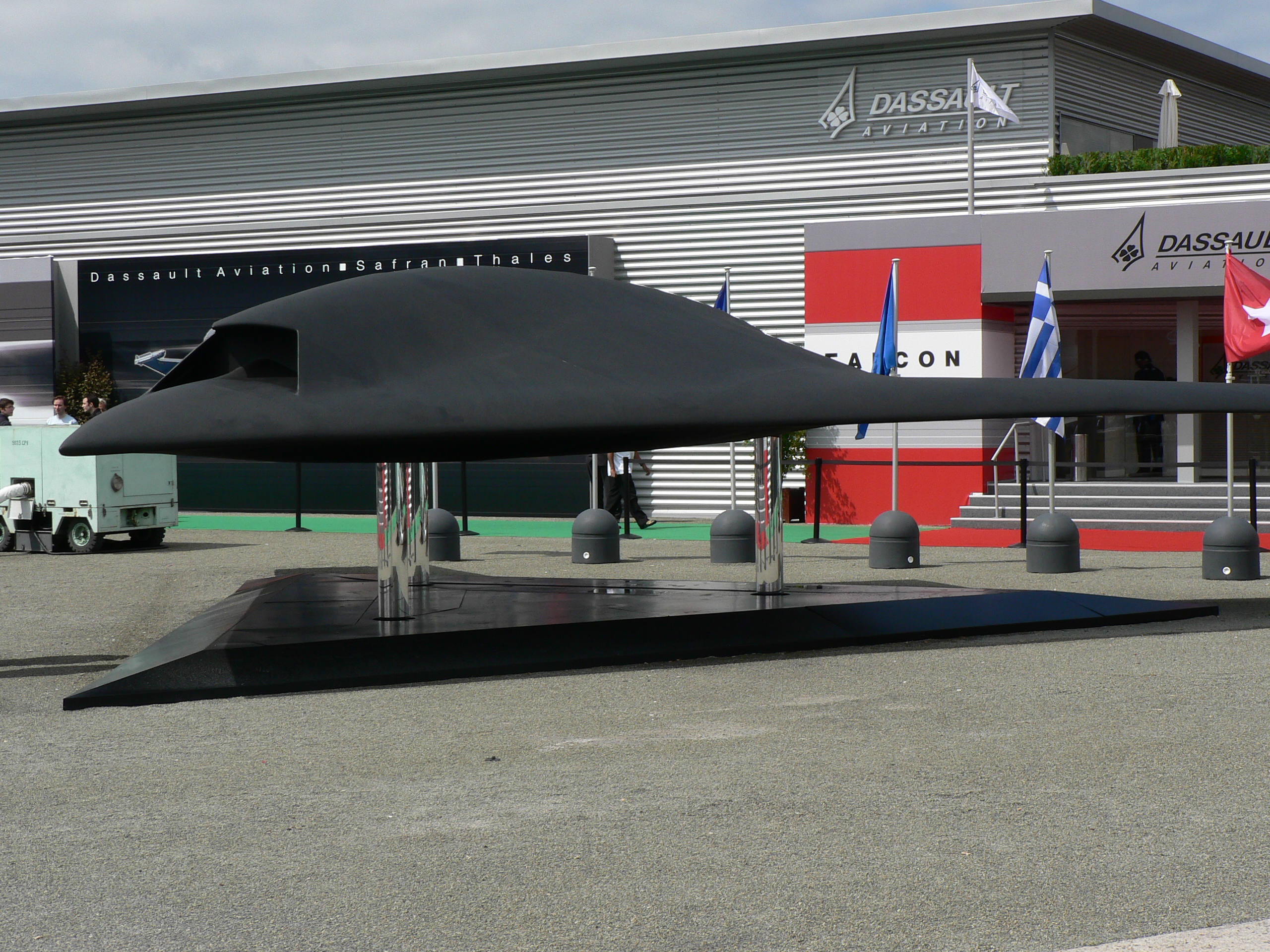
The fuselage for the Dassault nEUROn stealth jet is produced in Greece by the Hellenic Aerospace Industry

==== Maritime ====
The Port of Piraeus

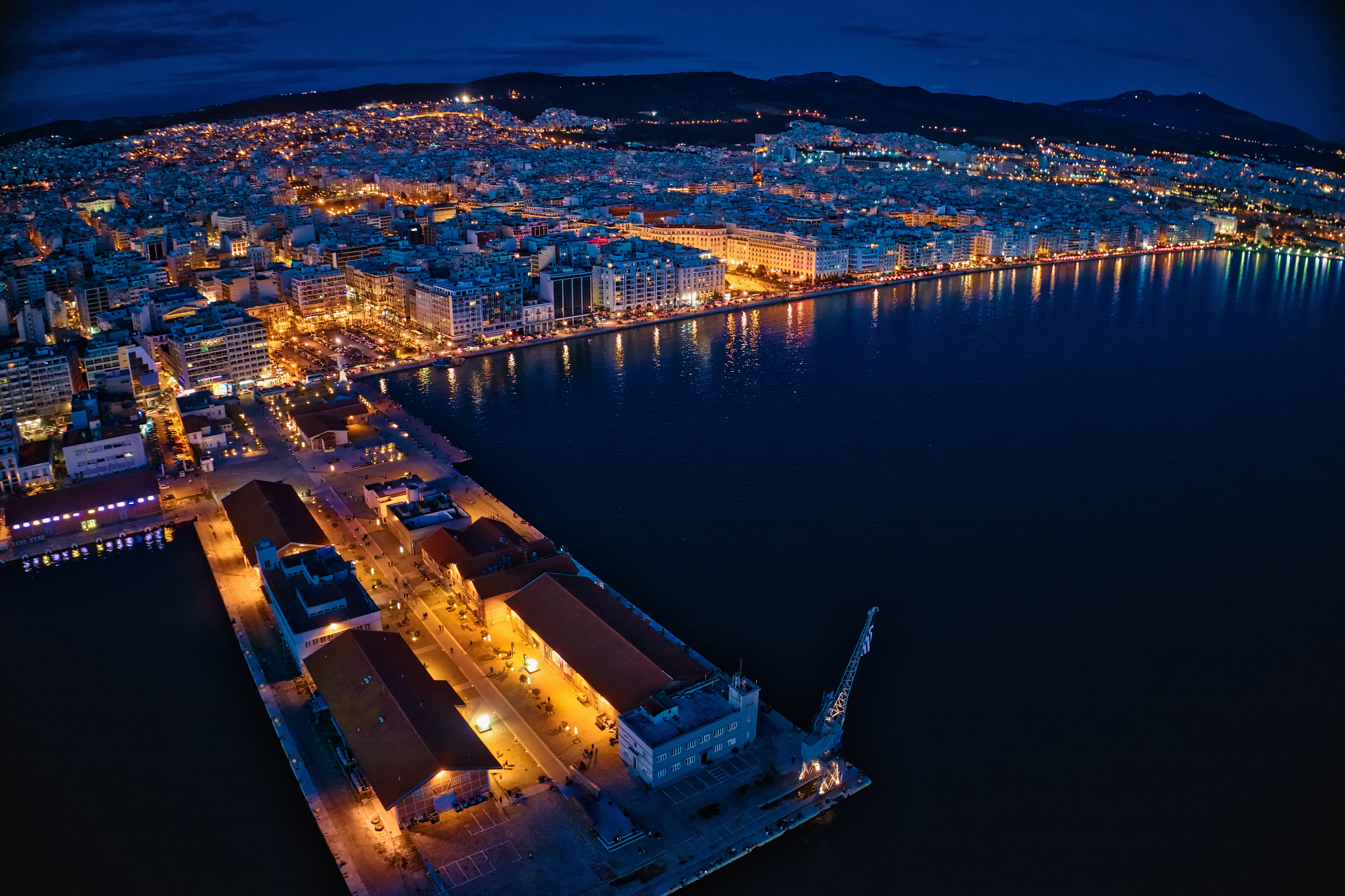
The Port of Thessaloniki

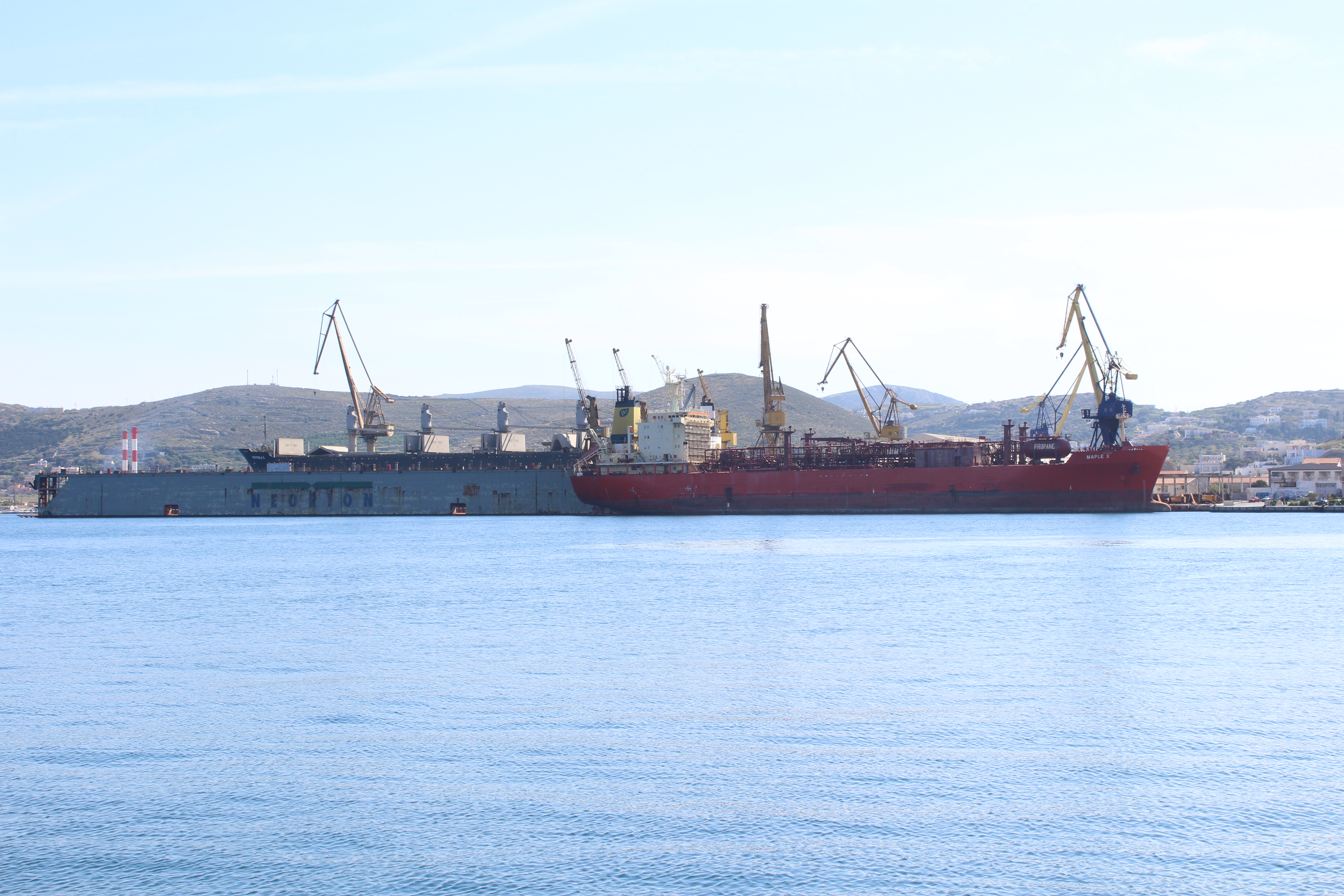
Neorion shipyard, located in Ermoupolis

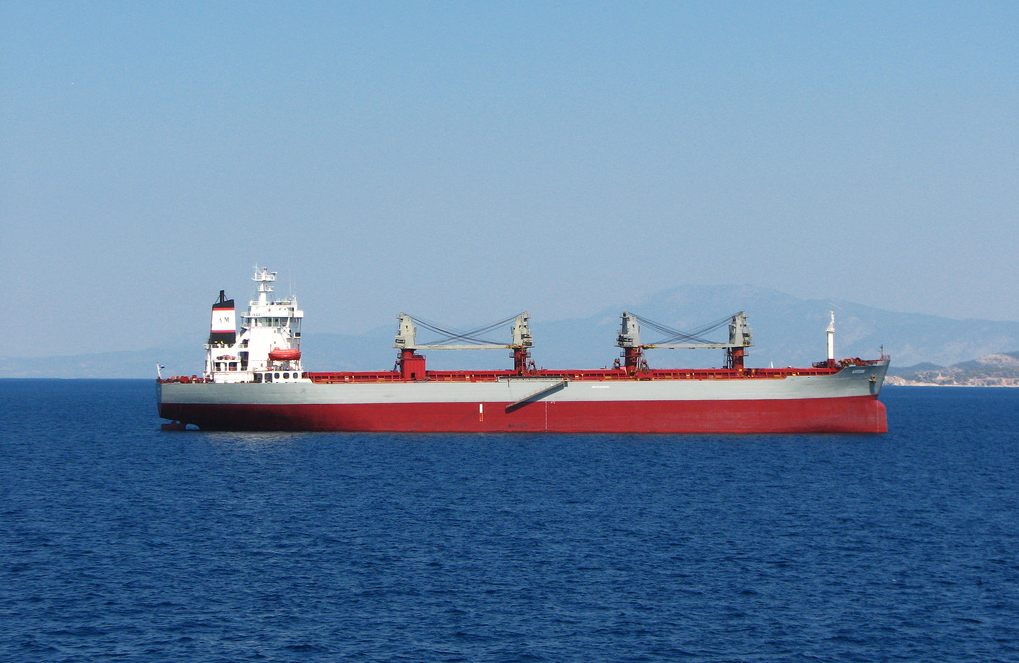
23.2% of the world's total merchant fleet is owned by Greek companies, making it the largest in the world. They are ranked in the top 5 for all kinds of ships, including first for tankers and bulk carriers.

Shipping has traditionally been a key sector in the Greek economy since ancient times. In 1813, the Greek merchant navy was made up of 615 ships. Its total tonnage was 153,580 tons and was crewed with 37,526 sailors and 5,878 cannons. In 1914 the figures stood at 449,430 tons and 1,322 ships (of which 287 were steam boats).

During the 1960s, the size of the Greek fleet nearly doubled, primarily through the investment undertaken by the shipping magnates Onassis, Vardinoyannis, Livanos and Niarchos. The basis of the modern Greek maritime industry was formed after World War II when Greek shipping businessmen were able to amass surplus ships sold to them by the United States Government through the Ship Sales Act of the 1940s.

Greece has the largest merchant navy in the world, accounting for more than 15% of the world's total deadweight tonnage (dwt) according to the United Nations Conference on Trade and Development. The Greek merchant navy's total dwt of nearly 245 million is comparable only to Japan's, which is ranked second with almost 224 million. Additionally, Greece represents 39.52% of all of the European Union's dwt. However, today's fleet roster is smaller than an all-time high of 5,000 ships in the late 1970s.

Greece is ranked third in the world by number of ships, with 4,709, behind Japan, with 5,974, and China, which leads with 7,114 owned vessels. A European Community Shipowners' Associations report for 2011–2012 reveals that the Greek flag is the seventh-most-used internationally for shipping, while it ranks second in the EU.

In terms of ship categories, Greek companies have 22.6% of the world's tankers and 16.1% of the world's bulk carriers (in dwt). An additional equivalent of 27.45% of the world's tanker dwt is on order, with another 12.7% of bulk carriers also on order. Shipping accounts for an estimated 6% of Greek GDP, employs about 160,000 people (4% of the workforce), and represents 1/3 of the country's trade deficit. Earnings from shipping amounted to €14.1 billion in 2011, while between 2000 and 2010 Greek shipping contributed a total of €140 billion (half of the country's public debt in 2009 and 3.5 times the receipts from the European Union in the period 2000–2013). The 2011 ECSA report showed that there are approximately 750 Greek shipping companies in operation.

The latest available data from the Union of Greek Shipowners show that "the Greek-owned ocean-going fleet consists of 3,428 ships, totaling 245 million deadweight tonnes in capacity. This equals 15.6 percent of the carrying capacity of the entire global fleet, including 23.6 percent of the world tanker fleet and 17.2 percent of dry bulk".

Counting shipping as quasi-exports and in terms of monetary value, Greece ranked 4th globally in 2011 having exported shipping services worth 17,704.132 million $; only Denmark, Germany and South Korea ranked higher during that year. Similarly counting shipping services provided to Greece by other countries as quasi-imports and the difference between exports and imports as a trade balance, Greece in 2011 ranked in the latter second behind Germany, having imported shipping services worth 7,076.605 million US$ and having run a trade surplus of 10,712.342 million US$. In 2022, Greek used vessel sales were second only to China's.

Greece — Shipping Services (2020–2025)
Indicator	2020	2021	2022	2023	2024	2025
Exports
US$ million	15,748	22,099	22,190	16,185	15,380	15,620^{p}
€ million	13,814	18,728	21,073	14,968	14,210	13,823^{p}
% of GDP	8.25%	10.15%	10.18%	6.66%	6.00%	5.57%
Imports
US$ million	4,493	5,378	11,425	8,295	7,720	7,410^{p}
€ million	3,941	4,557	10,850	7,671	7,132	6,558^{p}
% of GDP	2.35%	2.47%	5.24%	3.41%	3.01%	2.64%
Trade Balance (Surplus)
US$ million	11,255	16,722	10,765	7,890	7,660	8,210^{p}
€ million	9,873	14,171	10,223	7,297	7,078	7,265^{p}
% of GDP	5.89%	7.68%	4.94%	3.25%	2.99%	2.93%
Reference Indicator
GDP (€ million)	167,540	184,575	207,009	224,686	236,736	248,354^{p}

Historical Averages & Rankings (2000–2019)

Period	2000–05^{a}	2006–08	2009–11^{a}	2012–15	2016–19^{a}
Exports Rank	3rd–5th	-^{b}	4th–6th	n/a	
Exports (€M / %GDP)	9,805 (5.89%)	-^{b}	12,967 (5.89%)	n/a	15,245^{b} (8.48%)
Imports Rank	13th–16th	-^{b}	9th–13th	n/a	
Imports (€M / %GDP)	4,200^{e} (2.58%)	-^{b}	5,254 (2.39%)	n/a	5,263^{b} (2.93%)
Balance Rank	1st–2nd	-^{b}	1st–2nd	n/a	
Balance (€M / %GDP)	6,305^{e} (3.74%)	-^{b}	7,714 (3.50%)	n/a	9,983^{b} (5.55%)

Note: Following the shift to BPM6 reporting standards, standalone global rankings for maritime transport services are no longer published by the WTO/ITC; data from 2016 onward reflect revised Bank of Greece series.
a: annual average; b: break in time series (BPM6 / Sept. 2018 revision); p: provisional; e: erroneous imports break (2003 excluded).

==== Mining ====
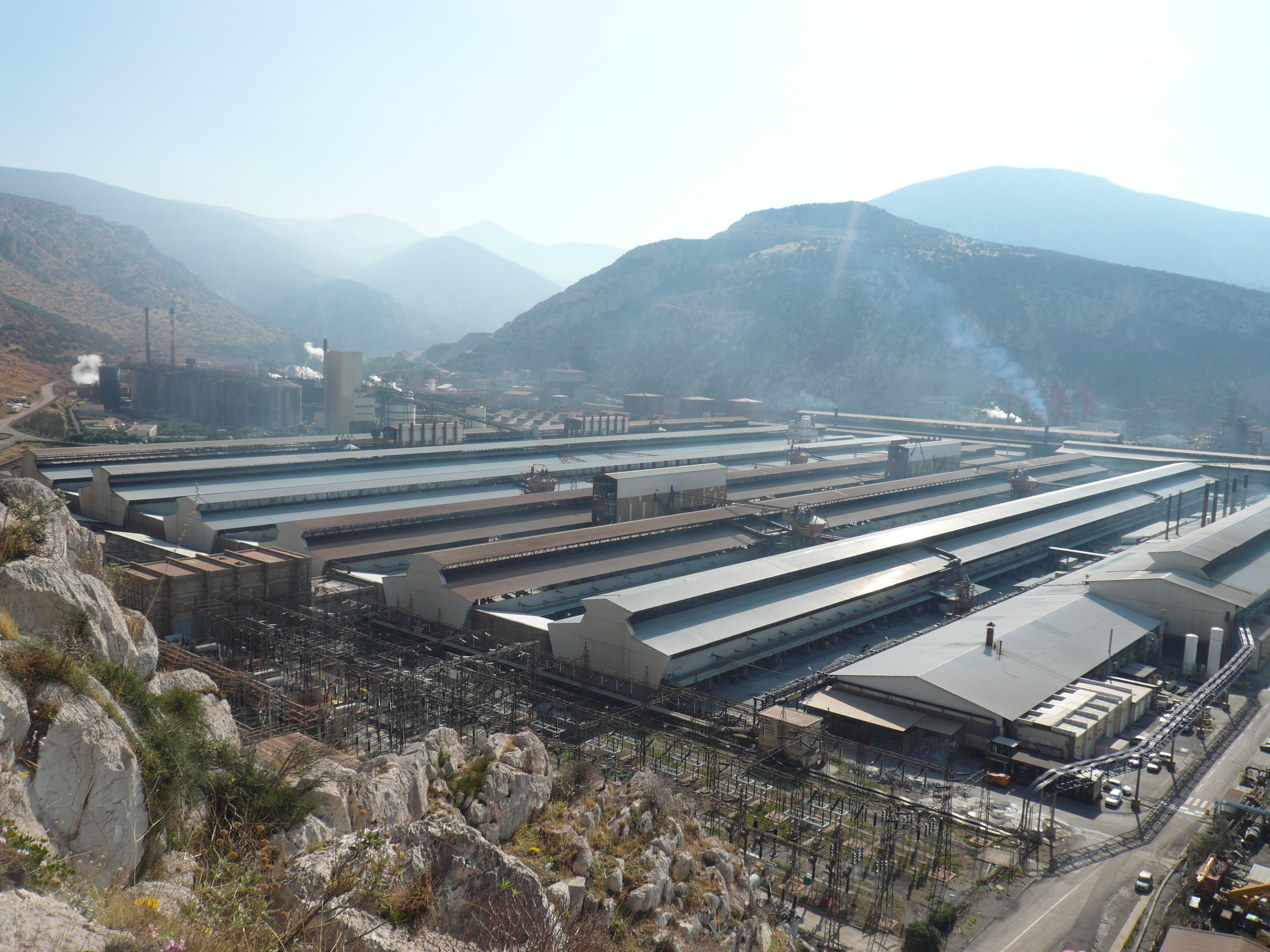
Aluminium of Greece facilities

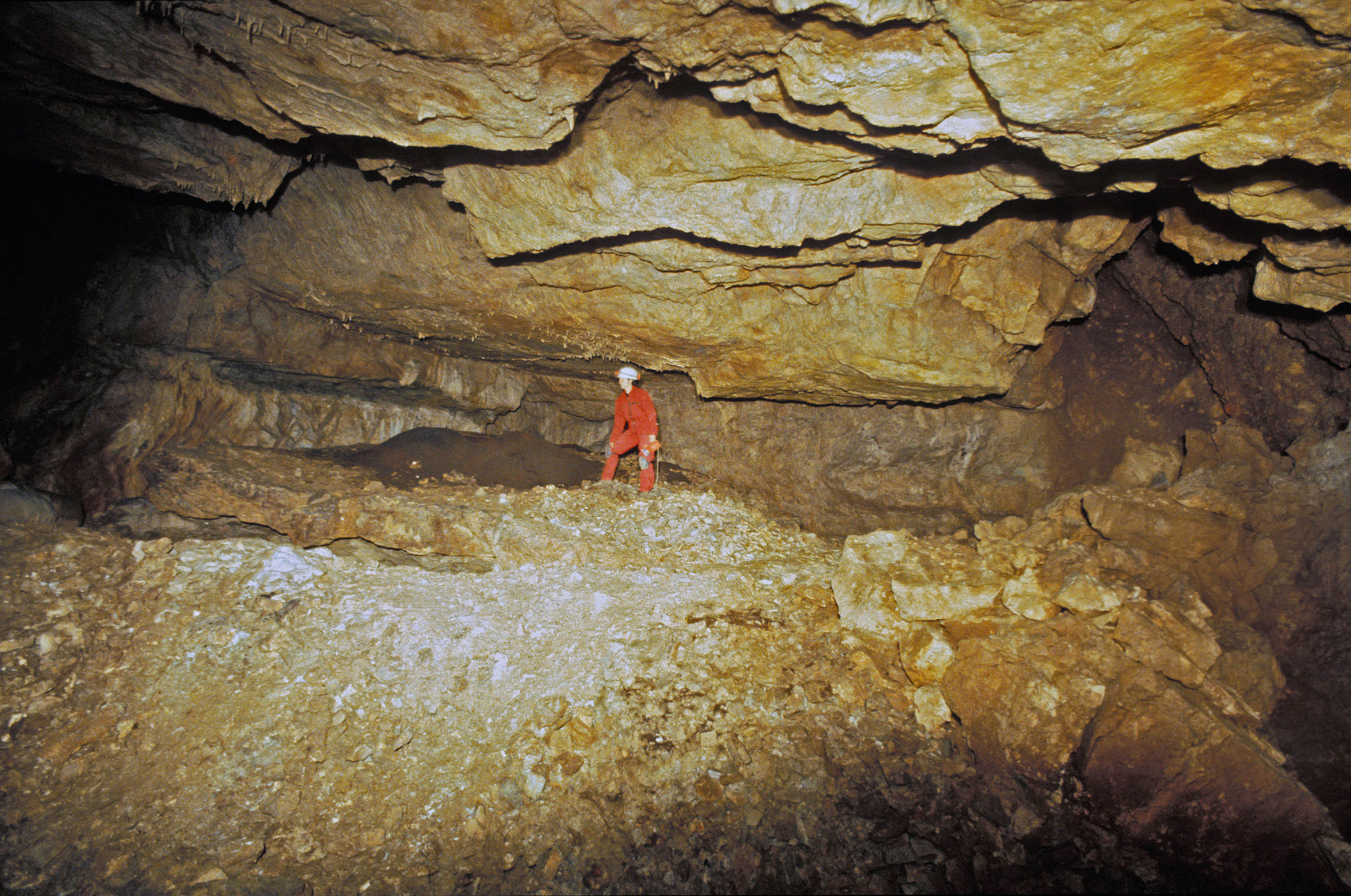
Gold mine in Thasos

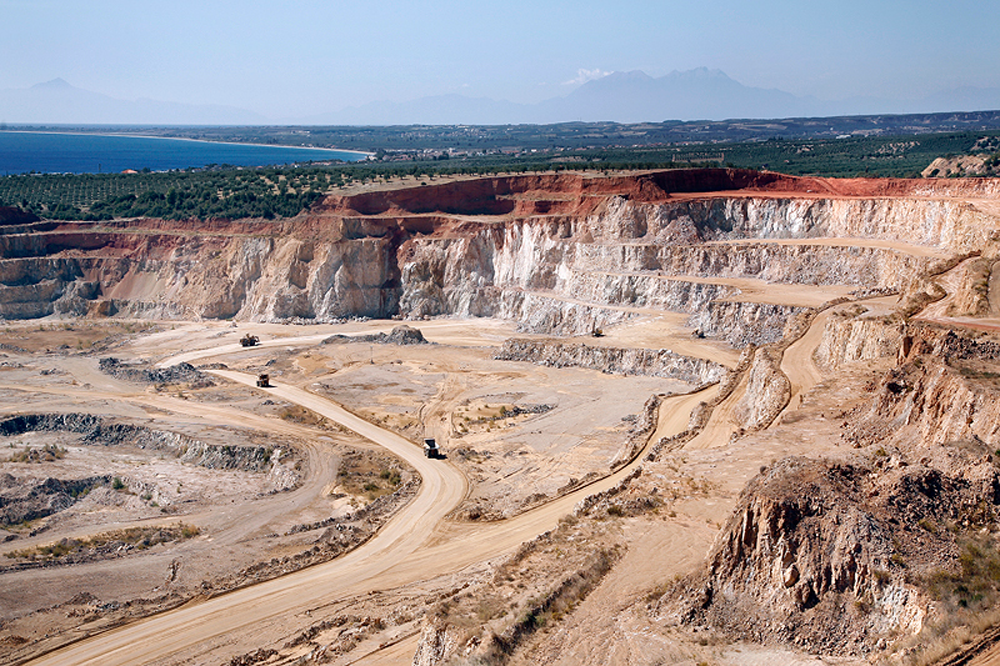
Gerakini mine

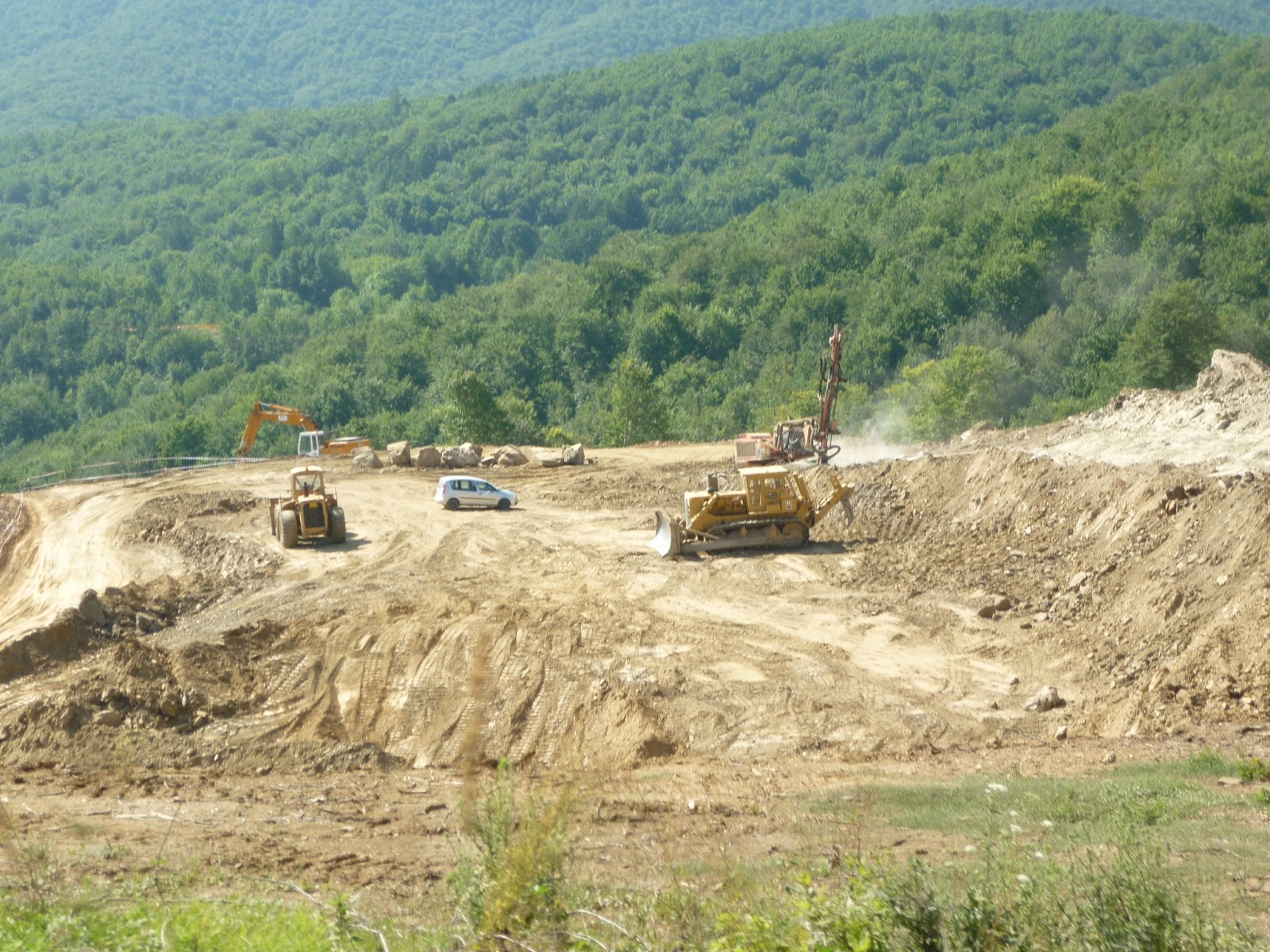
Skouries mine

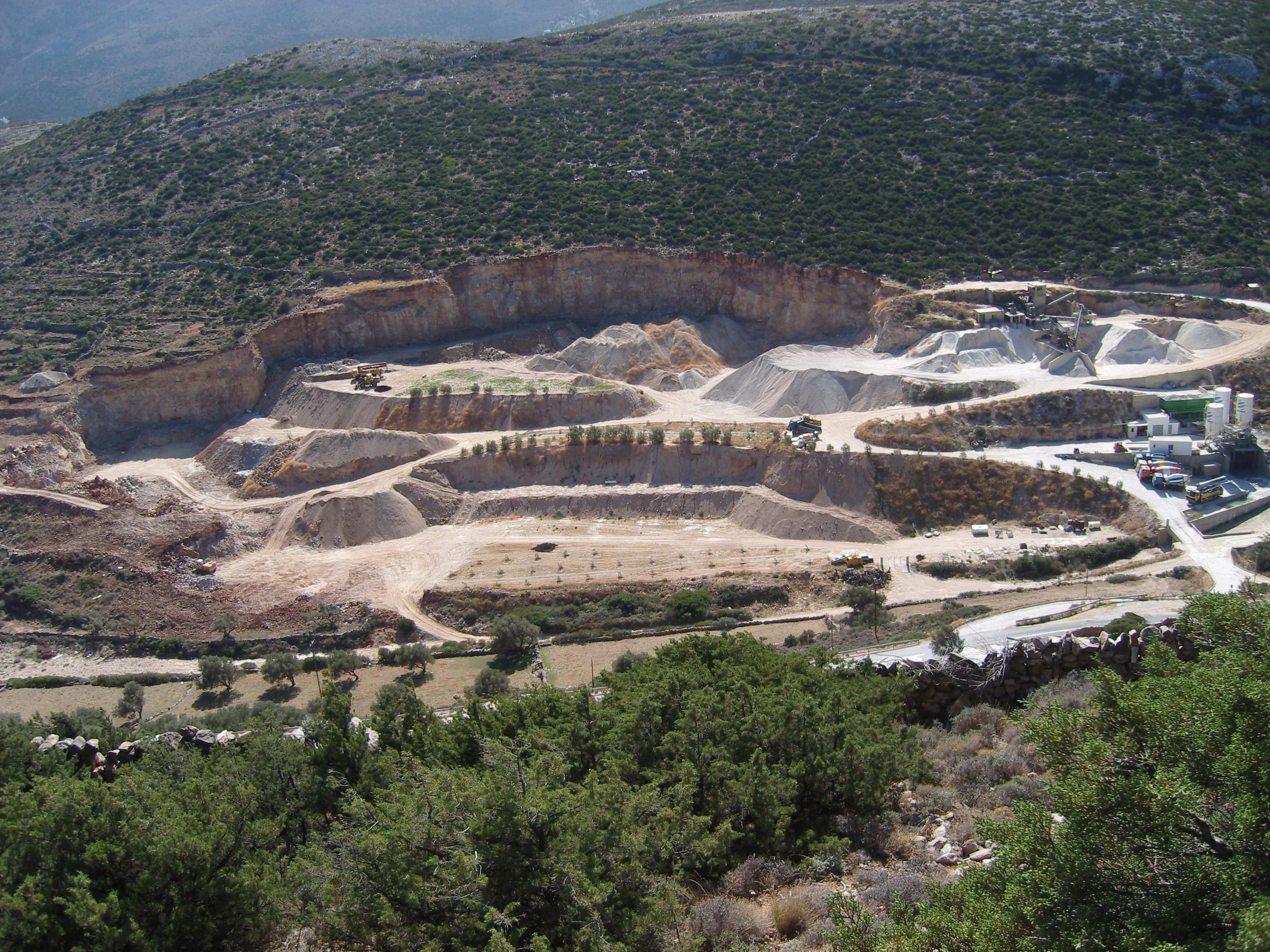
Marble quarry in Sifnos

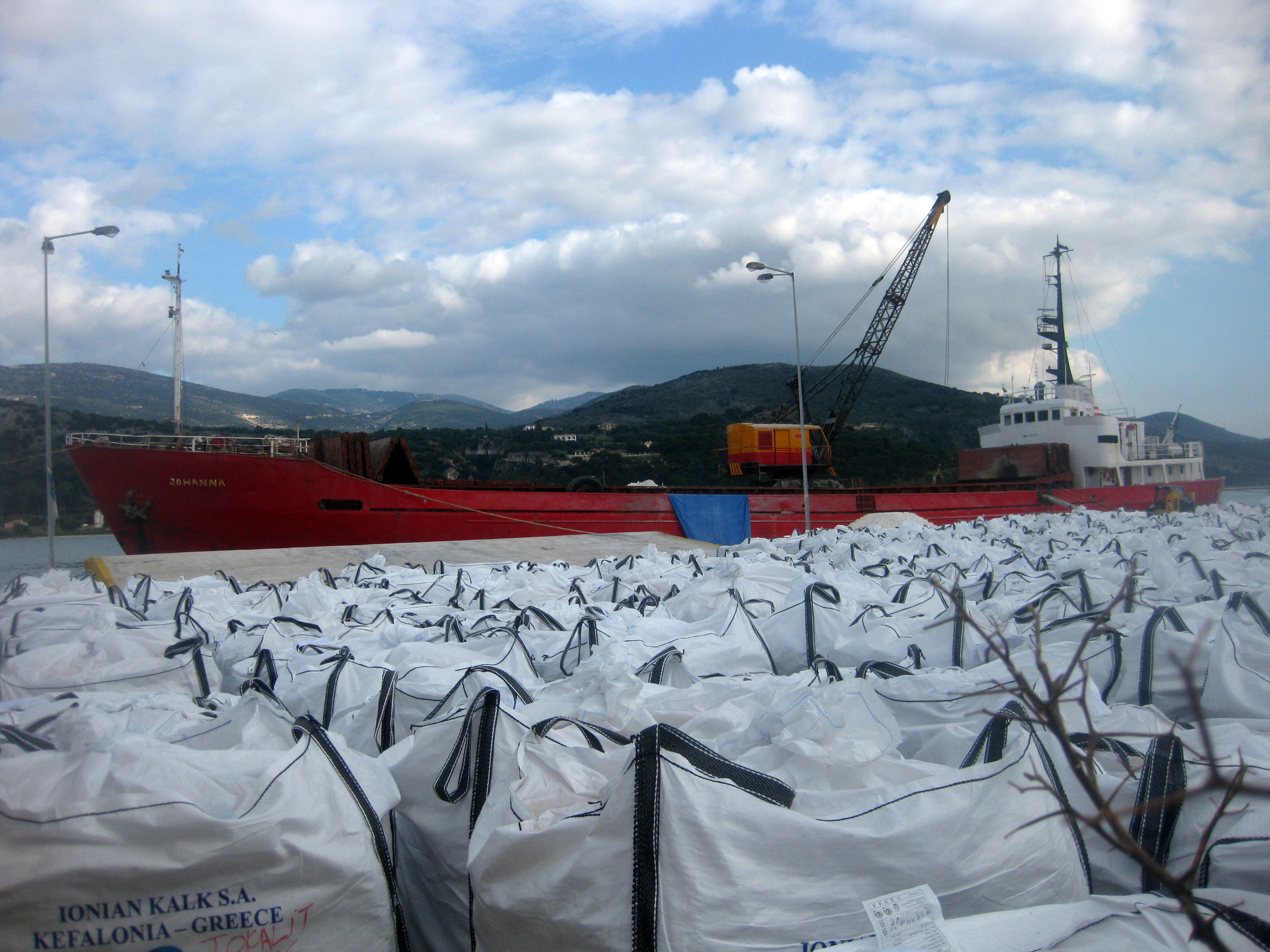
Calcium carbonate loaded at the port of Argostoli

Greece possesses modest deposits of gold, silver, chromite, lead, barite, and zinc. Greece is a leading global supplier and producer of perlite and bentonite and a top producer of pumice and magnesite, largely mined on islands such as Milos, Kos and Euboea.

In metallic mining, Greece is the largest producer of bauxite in the European Union and hosts the bloc's only vertically integrated alumina and primary aluminium production complex (Aluminium of Greece in Boeotia), which also supports EU-designated strategic projects for gallium production. Historically, Greece was also a major European producer of ferronickel through state-owned LARCO until the cessation of its smelting operations in the early 2020s.

In northern Greece, gold and base-metal mining is centered on the Kassandra Mines in Chalkidiki, operated by Hellas Gold (Ελληνικός Χρυσός). Alongside underground operations at Olympiada (producing gold, silver, lead, and zinc), the large-scale Skouries copper-gold project entered production in 2025–2026, making Greece one of the European Union's notable producers of primary gold and copper.

== Tertiary sector ==
=== Banking and finance ===
The Greek banking sector is supervised by the Bank of Greece and the European Central Bank (ECB) under the Single Supervisory Mechanism. Following extensive post-crisis consolidation, which reduced the number of domestic credit institutions from 35 in 2009 to 13 by the mid-2020s, the market is dominated by four systemic banks: Eurobank, the National Bank of Greece, Piraeus Bank, and Alpha Bank, which together with Credia Bank account for roughly 96% of total banking assets.

Greece — Bank NPL Ratio
% of total loans

Year NPLs (%)

2016 (peak)46.7%
202030.1%
20228.7%
20263.3%
Post-Hercules scheme reduction. Source: Bank of Greece.

Supported by the state-backed Hercules asset protection scheme, banks reduced their non-performing loan (NPL) ratio from a crisis peak of over 45% to 3.3–3.4% by 2025–2026, while the Hellenic Financial Stability Fund completed its divestment from the systemic lenders in 2023–2024.

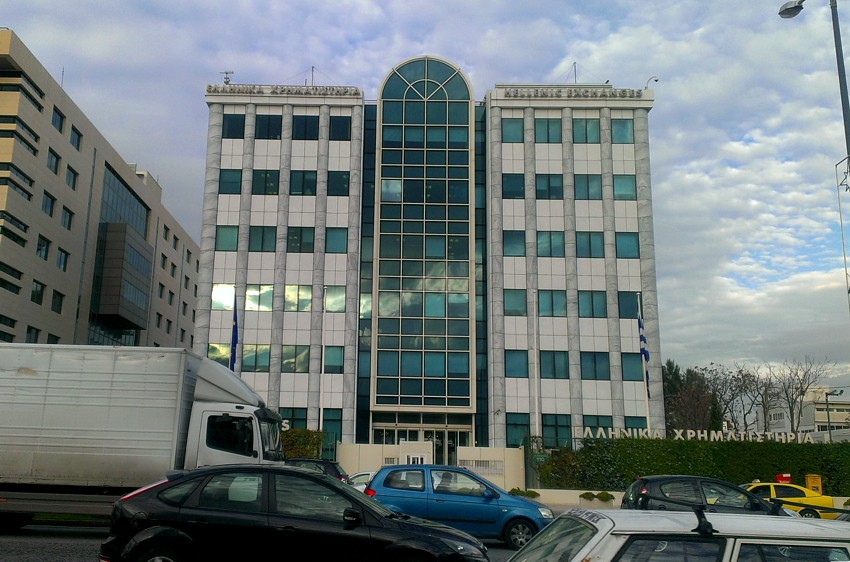
Athens Stock Exchange
Headquarters of the Athens Exchange Group (ATHEX) on Athinon Avenue.

Capital markets center on the Athens Stock Exchange (operating as Euronext Athens), whose total market capitalization rose to approximately $129 billion (46 percent of GDP) by late 2025. In September 2026, major global index providers—including FTSE Russell, STOXX, and S&P Dow Jones Indices—officially reclassified Greece from Emerging to Developed Market status, reversing its 2013 downgrade during the sovereign debt crisis.

Greece's insurance market is overseen by the Bank of Greece and features strong bancassurance integration alongside international groups such as NN Group, Generali, and Allianz. Founded in 1891, Ethniki Hellenic General Insurance Company remains the country's oldest insurer and second-largest composite insurance provider (with a 13.6 percent market share), having been fully acquired by Piraeus Financial Holdings in November 2025.

=== Education ===
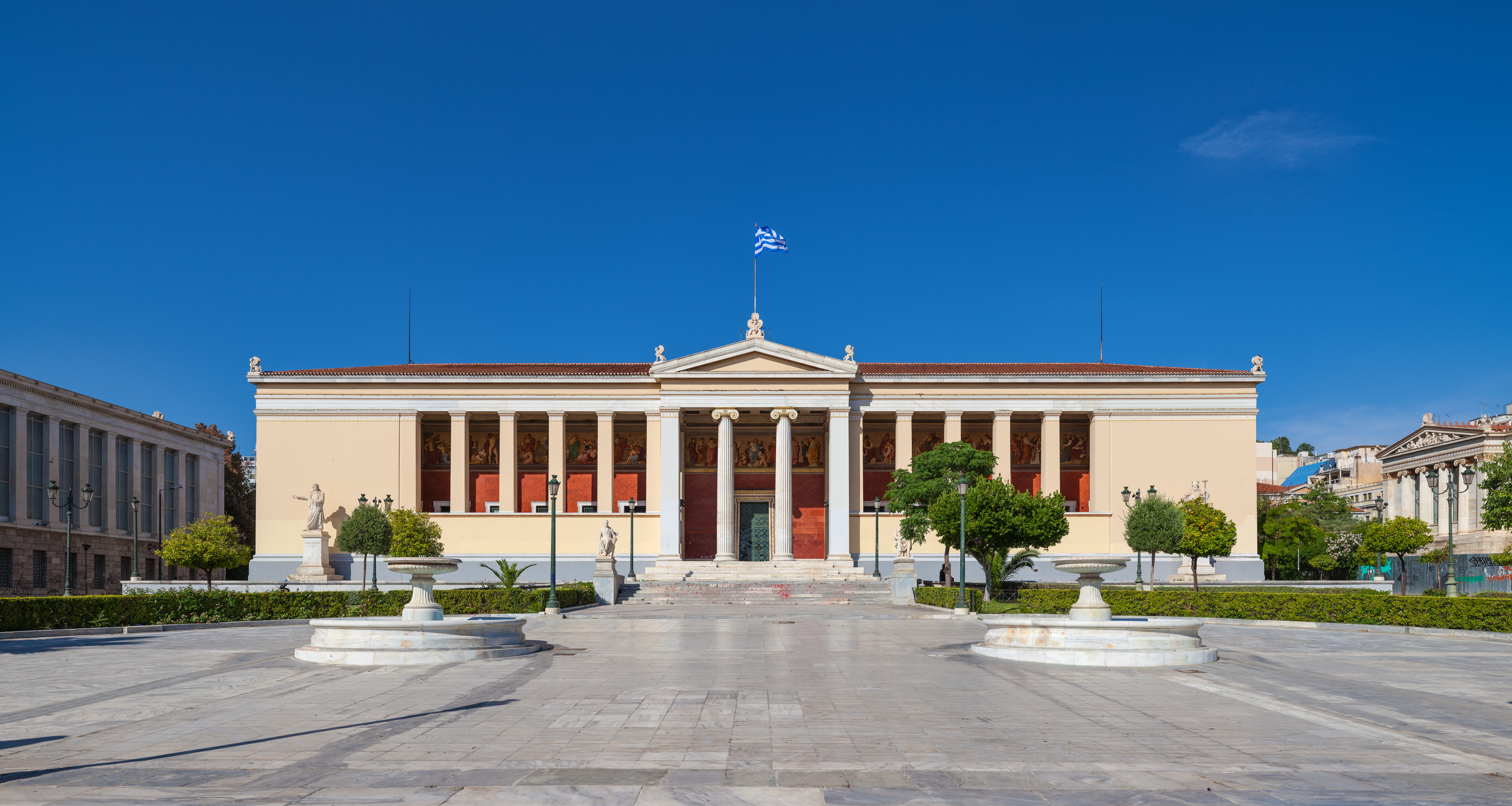
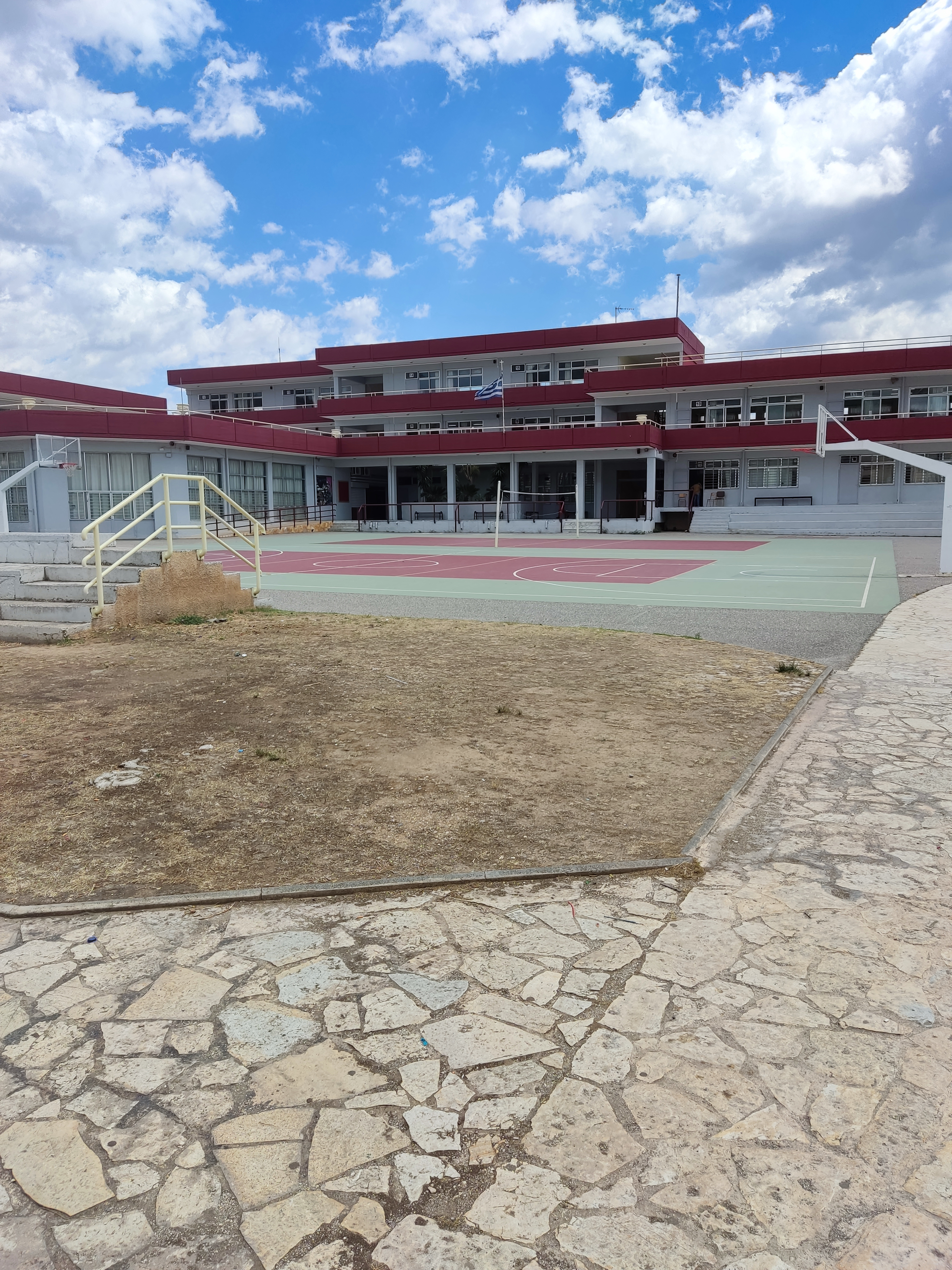
The central building of Athens University (left), and the building of a high school in Argos, right.

Education in Greece is centralized and governed by the Ministry of Education, Religious Affairs, and Sports (Greek: Υπουργείο Παιδείας, Θρησκευμάτων και Αθλητισμού, Υ.ΠΑΙ.Θ.Α.) at all grade levels throughout elementary, middle school, and high school. The Ministry exercises control over public schools, formulates and implements legislation, administers the budget, coordinates national level university entrance examinations, sets up the national curriculum, appoints public school teaching staff, and coordinates other services.

The Ministry of Education and Religious Affairs is also in charge of which classes are necessary for general education. They have implemented mandatory courses such as religion in required grade levels (1st-9th grades). Students can only be exempt if their guardians fill out a declaration excluding them from religious lessons.

The national supervisory role of the Ministry is exercised through Regional Unit Public Education Offices, which are named Regional Directorates of Primary and Secondary School Education. Public schools and their supply of textbooks are funded by the government. Public schools in Greece are tuition-free and students on a state approved list are provided textbooks at no cost.

About 25% of postgraduate programmes are tuition-fee, while about 30% of students are eligible to attend programmes tuition-free based on individual criteria.

Formal education in Greece consists of three educational stages. The first stage of formal education is the primary stage, which lasts for six years starting aged six and ending at the age of 12, followed by the secondary stage, which is separated into two sub-stages: the compulsory middle school, which lasts three years starting at age 12, and non-compulsory Lyceum, which lasts three years starting at 15. The third stage involves higher education.

School holidays in Greece include Christmas, Greek Independence Day, Easter, National Anniversary Day, a three-month summer holiday, National Public Holidays, and local holidays, which vary by region such as the local patron saint's day.

In addition to schooling, the majority of students attend extracurricular private classes at private tutoring centres called "frontistiria" (φροντιστήρια, frontistiria), or one-to-one tuition. These centres prepare students for higher education admissions, like the Pan-Hellenic Examinations, and/or provide foreign language education.

It is forbidden by law for students to use mobile phones while on the school premises. Taking or making phone calls, texting, or the use of other camera, video or other recording devices or medium that have image and audio processing ability like smartwatches is forbidden. Students must switch off their mobile phones or set them to silent mode and keep them in their bags while on the school premises. However, especially at high schools, the use of mobile phones is widespread, especially at breaks and sometimes in the class.

=== Healthcare ===
Logo of the Ministry for Health and Social Solidarity.

Healthcare in Greece consists of a universal health care system provided through national health insurance, and private health care. According to the 2011 budget, the Greek healthcare system was allocated 6.1 billion euro, or 2.8% of GDP. In a 2000 report by the World Health Organization, the Greek healthcare system was ranked 14th worldwide in the overall assessment, above other countries such as Germany (25) and the United Kingdom (18), while ranking 11th at level of service.

Healthcare in Greece is provided by the National Healthcare Service (ESY) (Greek: Εθνικό Σύστημα Υγείας, ΕΣΥ) (or National Health System, ESY).

=== Telecommunications ===
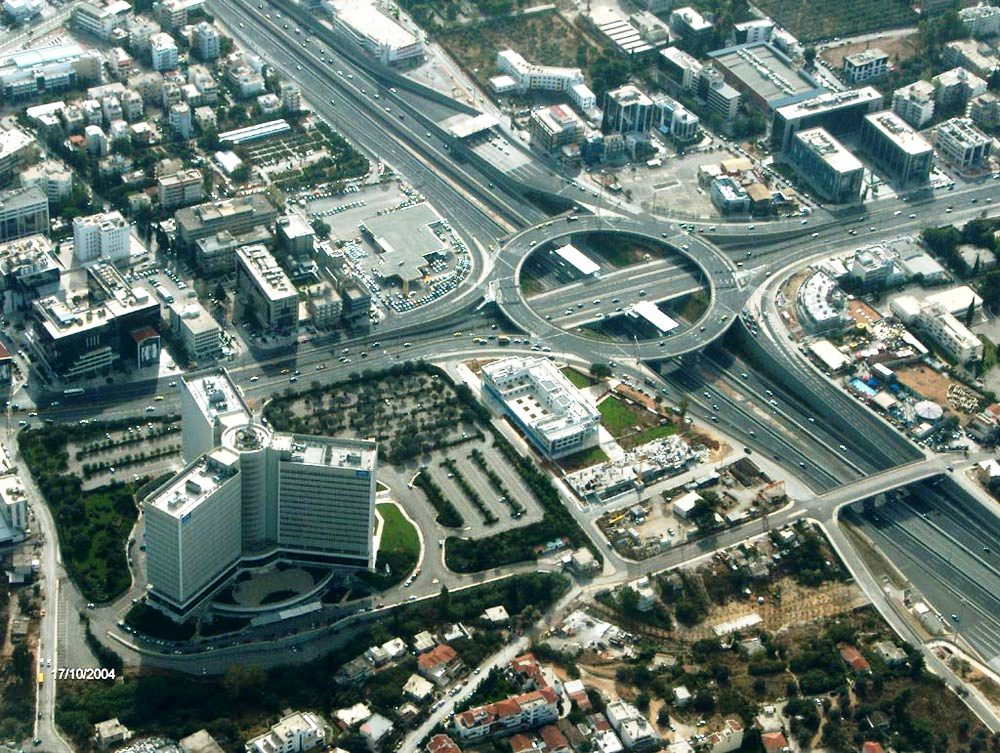
OTE headquarters in Athens

Between 1949 and the 1980s, telephone communications in Greece were a state monopoly by the Hellenic Telecommunications Organization, better known by its acronym, OTE. Despite the liberalization of telephone communications in the country in the 1980s, OTE still dominates the Greek market in its field and has emerged as one of the largest telecommunications companies in Southeast Europe. Since 2011, the company's major shareholder is Deutsche Telekom with a 40% stake, while the Greek state continues to own 10% of the company's shares. OTE owns several subsidiaries across in Southeast Europe, including Cosmote, Greece's top mobile telecommunications provider, Cosmote Romania and Albanian Mobile Communications.

Other mobile telecommunications companies active in Greece are Wind Hellas and Vodafone Greece. The total number of active cellular phone accounts in the country in 2009 based on statistics from the country's mobile phone providers was over 20 million, a penetration of 180%. Additionally, there are 5.745 million active landlines in the country.

Greece has tended to lag behind its European Union partners in terms of Internet use, with the gap closing rapidly in recent years. The percentage of households with Internet access more than doubled between 2006 and 2013, from 23% to 56% respectively (compared with an EU average of 49% and 79%). At the same time, there was a massive increase in the proportion of households with a broadband connection, from 4% in 2006 to 55% in 2013 (compared with an EU average of 30% and 76%). By 2026, the percentage of Greek households with Internet access had reached 89.5%.

=== Tourism ===
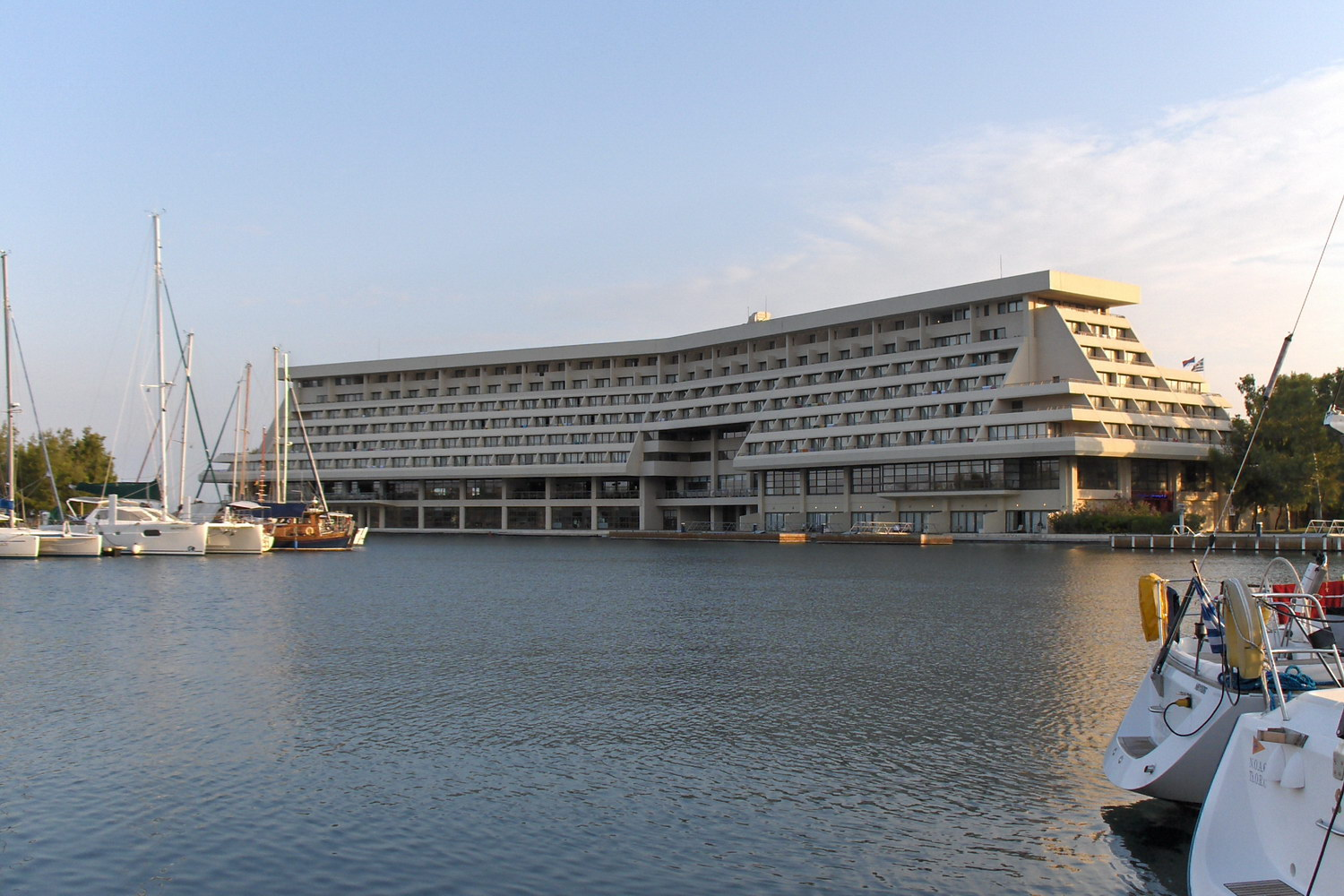
Porto Carras resort, Chalkidiki

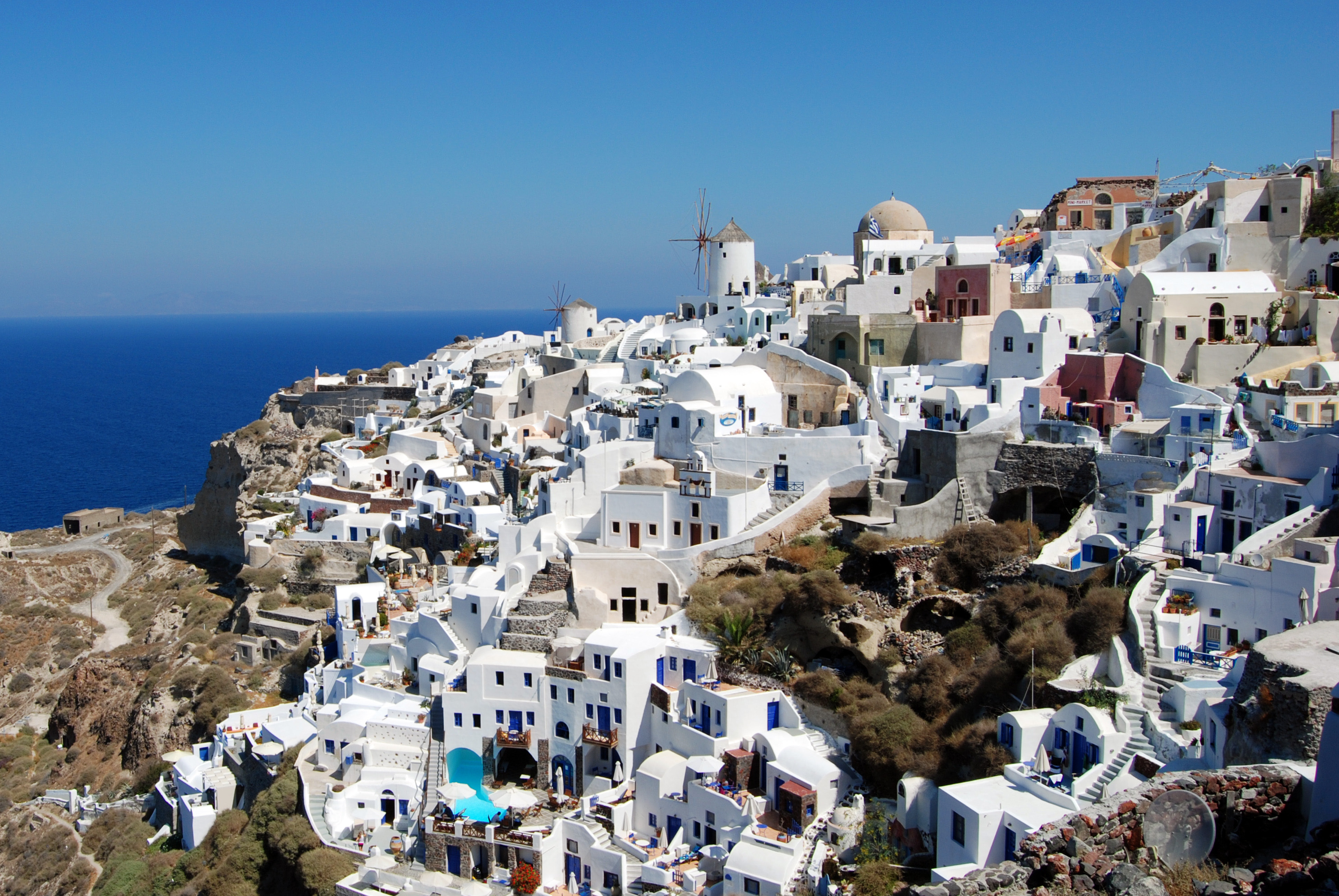
The island of Santorini, popular tourist destination.

Tourism in the modern sense only started to flourish in Greece in the years post-1950, although tourism in ancient times is also documented in relation to religious or sports festivals such as the Olympic Games. Since the 1950s, the tourism sector saw an unprecedented boost as arrivals went from 33,000 in 1950 to 11.4 million in 1994.

Greece attracts more than 16 million tourists each year, thus contributing 18.2% to the nation's GDP in 2008 according to an OECD report. The same survey showed that the average tourist expenditure while in Greece was $1,073, ranking Greece 10th in the world. The number of jobs directly or indirectly related to the tourism sector were 840,000 in 2008 and represented 19% of the country's total labor force. In 2009, Greece welcomed over 19.3 million tourists, a major increase from the 17.7 million tourists the country welcomed in 2008. With 31.3 million international tourists in 2019, Greece was the 7th-most-visited country in the European Union and 13th in the world, marking a steady increase from 18 million tourists in 2013.

Among the member states of the European Union, Greece was the most popular destination for residents of Cyprus and Sweden in 2011.

The ministry responsible for tourism is the Ministry of Culture and Tourism, while Greece also owns the Greek National Tourism Organization which aims in promoting tourism in Greece.

In recent years a number of well-known tourism-related organizations have placed Greek destinations in the top of their lists. In 2009 Lonely Planet ranked Thessaloniki, the country's second-largest city, the world's fifth best "Ultimate Party Town", alongside cities such as Montreal and Dubai, while in 2011 the island of Santorini was voted as the best island in the world by Travel + Leisure. The neighbouring island of Mykonos was ranked as the 5th best island Europe. Thessaloniki was the European Youth Capital in 2014.

== Trade and investment ==
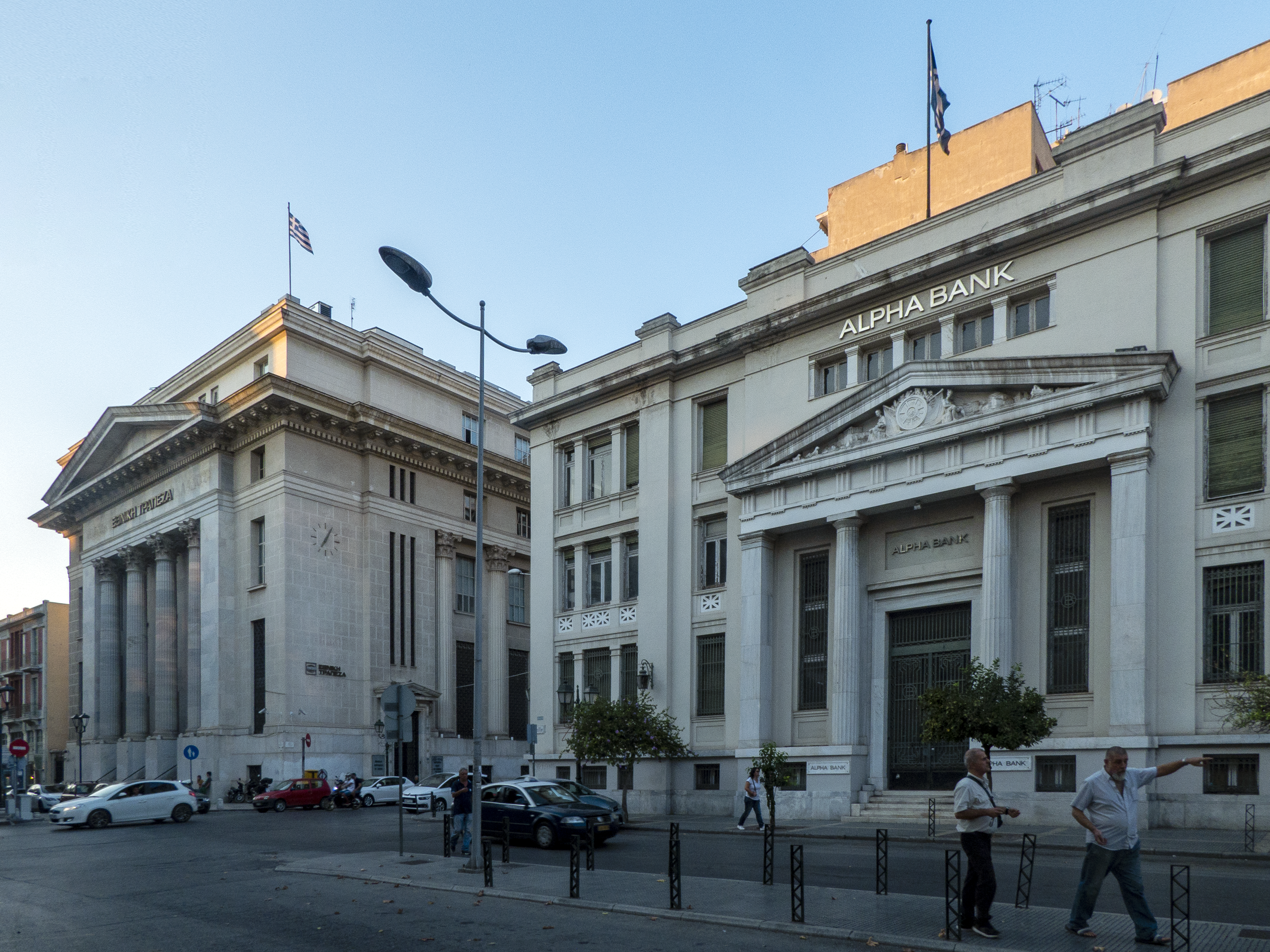
The Bank of Greece/National Bank of Greece and former Ionian Bank (today Alpha Bank) buildings in Thessaloniki

=== Foreign investment ===
Since the fall of communism, Greece has invested heavily in neighbouring countries in Southeast Europe. Between 1997 and 2009, 12.11% of foreign direct investment capital in North Macedonia was Greek, ranking fourth. In 2009 alone, Greeks invested €380 million in the country, with companies such as Hellenic Petroleum having made important strategic investments. Greece was the largest foreign investor in Albania in 2013, the third in Bulgaria, in the top-three in Romania and Serbia and the most important trading partner and largest foreign investor in North Macedonia.

Greece invested €1.38 billion in Bulgaria between 2005 and 2007 and many important companies (including Bulgarian Postbank, United Bulgarian Bank Coca-Cola Bulgaria) are owned by Greek financial groups. In Serbia, 250 Greek companies are active with a total investment of over €2 billion. Romanian statistics from 2016 show that Greek investment in the country exceeded €4 billion, ranking Greece fifth or sixth among foreign investors. Greece has been the largest investor in Albania since the fall of communism with 25% of foreign investments in 2016 coming from Greece, in addition business relations between both are extremely strong and continuously rising.

=== Trade ===
Exports of Greece by product category (2019) Chemical products Transportation Machines Mineral products Plastics and rubbers Metals Foodstuffs Precious metals Textiles Instruments Animal products Vegetable products Paper goods Footwear and headwear Miscellaneous Stone and glass Wood products Animal and vegetable bi-products Animal hides Arts and antiques Weapons

During the debt crisis and subsequent COVID-19 recession, Greece's negative balance of trade decreased significantly–from €44.3 billion in 2008 to €18.15 billion in 2020–due to a substantial drop in imports. However, the trade boom of recent years has seen the balance approach pre-crisis levels. Exports increased by 30.9% in 2021 and 38.3% in 2022, while imports rose by 34.6% and 43.6% during the same period. This was followed by a correction in 2023, with exports and imports decreasing by 8.5% and 12.1% respectively. In 2024, exports decreased by 2% and imports increased by 3%. In 2025, exports and imports decreased by 2.7% and 3.5% respectively.

Greece is also the largest import partner of Cyprus (18.0%) and the largest export partner of Palau (82.4%).

Greece — Imports and Exports (2025)
Imports (Top Origins)
#	Origin	€ mil	Share
1	Germany	9,443.3	11.5%
2	Italy	7,390.4	9.0%
3	China	6,487.1	7.9%
4	Netherlands	5,091.2	6.2%
5	France	4,105.8	5.0%
6	Iraq	3,859.4	4.7%
7	Turkey	3,448.9	4.2%
—	European Union 27	45,656.3	55.6%
—	World	82,115.7	100.0%

Exports (Top Destinations)
#	Destination	€ mil	Share
1	Italy	4,422.6	9.1%
2	Germany	3,790.8	7.8%
3	Cyprus	3,304.8	6.8%
4	Bulgaria	3,159.0	6.5%
5	United States	2,381.4	4.9%
6	Romania	2,089.8	4.3%
7	United Kingdom	1,944.0	4.0%
—	European Union 27	27,750.7	57.1%
—	World	48,600.2	100.0%

Data refer to provisional annual merchandise trade figures for 2025; rounding differences may occur.

== Infrastructure ==
=== Transport ===
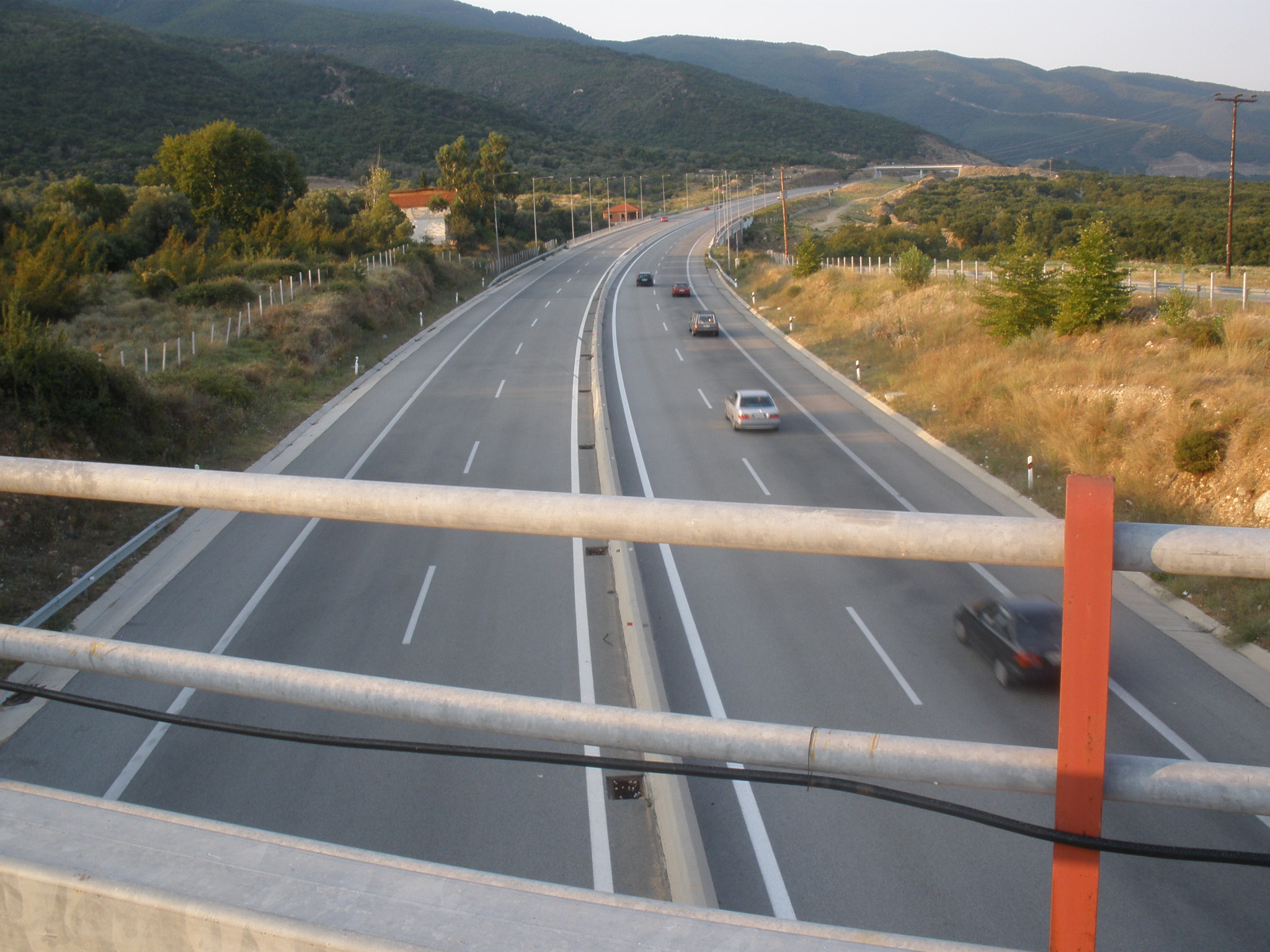
The Egnatia Odos, part of European route E90.

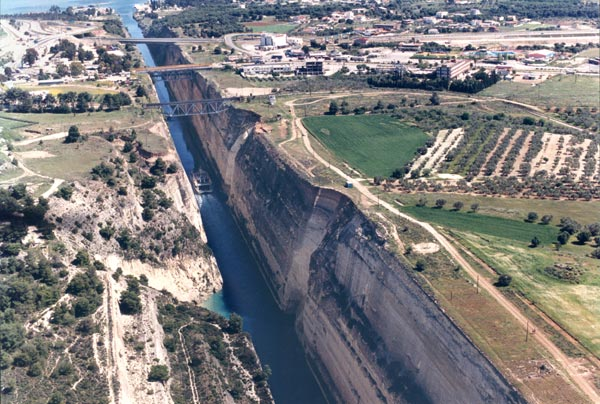
Corinth Canal

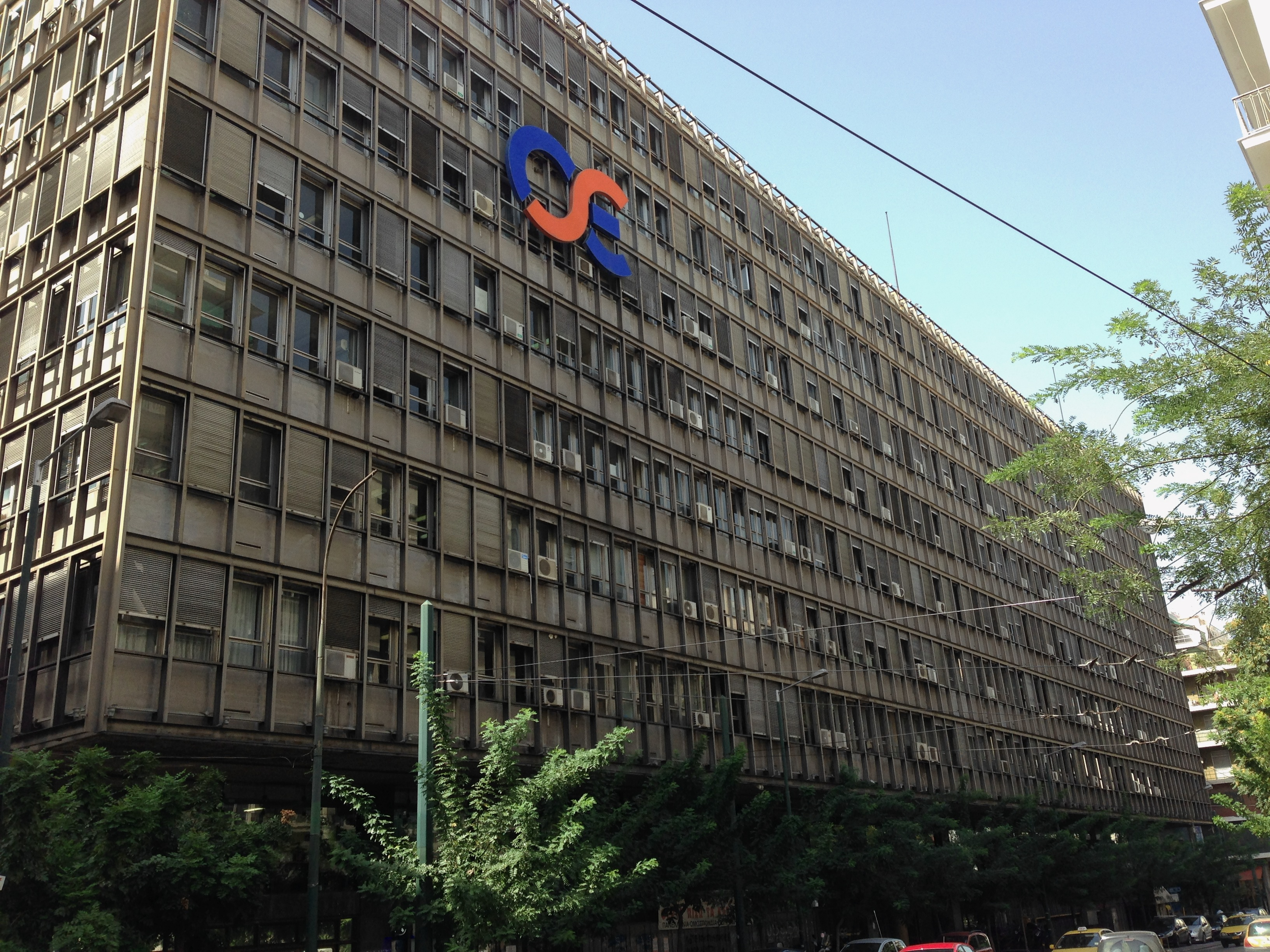
OSE HQs

As of 2012, Greece had a total of 82 airports, of which 67 were paved and six had runways longer than 3,047 meters. Of these airports, two are classified as "international" by the Hellenic Civil Aviation Authority, but 15 offer international services. Additionally Greece has 9 heliports. Greece does not have a flag carrier, but the country's airline industry is dominated by Aegean Airlines and its subsidiary Olympic Air.

Between 1975 and 2009, Olympic Airways (known after 2003 as Olympic Airlines) was the country's state-owned flag carrier, but financial problems led to its privatization and relaunch as Olympic Air in 2009. Both Aegean Airlines and Olympic Air have won awards for their services; in 2009 and 2011, Aegean Airlines was awarded the "Best regional airline in Europe" award by Skytrax, and also has two gold and one silver awards by the ERA, while Olympic Air holds one silver ERA award for "Airline of the Year" as well as a "Condé Nast Traveller 2011 Readers Choice Awards: Top Domestic Airline" award.

The Greek road network is made up of 116,986 km of roads, of which 1863 km are highways, ranking 24th worldwide, as of 2016. Since the entry of Greece to the European Community (now the European Union), a number of important projects (such as the Egnatia Odos and the Attiki Odos) have been co-funded by the organization, helping to upgrade the country's road network. In 2007, Greece ranked 8th in the European Union in goods transported by road at almost 500 million tons.

Greece's rail network is estimated to be at 2,548 km. Rail transport in Greece is operated by TrainOSE, a current subsidiary of the Ferrovie dello Stato Italiane after the Hellenic Railways Organisation had sold its 100% stake on the operator. Most of the country's network is standard gauge (1,565 km), while the country also has 983 km of narrow gauge. A total of 764 km of rail are electrified. Greece has rail connections with Bulgaria, North Macedonia and Turkey. A total of three suburban railway systems (Proastiakos) in Athens, Thessaloniki and Patras, and two metro systems (Athens Metro, Thessaloniki Metro) are in operation.

According to Eurostat, Greece's largest port by tons of goods transported in 2010 is the port of Aghioi Theodoroi, with 17.38 million tons. The Port of Thessaloniki comes second with 15.8 million tons, followed by the Port of Piraeus, with 13.2 million tons, and the port of Eleusis, with 12.37 million tons. The total number of goods transported through Greece in 2010 amounted to 124.38 million tons, a considerable drop from the 164.3 million tons transported through the country in 2007. Since then, Piraeus has grown to become the Mediterranean's third-largest port thanks to heavy investment by Chinese logistics giant COSCO. In 2013, Piraeus was declared the fastest-growing port in the world.

In 2010 Piraeus handled 513,319 TEUs, followed by Thessaloniki, which handled 273,282 TEUs. In the same year, 83.9 million people passed through Greece's ports, 12.7 million through the port of Paloukia in Salamis, another 12.7 through the port of Perama, 9.5 million through Piraeus and 2.7 million through Igoumenitsa. In 2013, Piraeus handled a record 3.16 million TEUs, the third-largest figure in the Mediterranean, of which 2.52 million were transported through Pier II, owned by COSCO and 644,000 were transported through Pier I, owned by the Greek state.

=== Energy ===
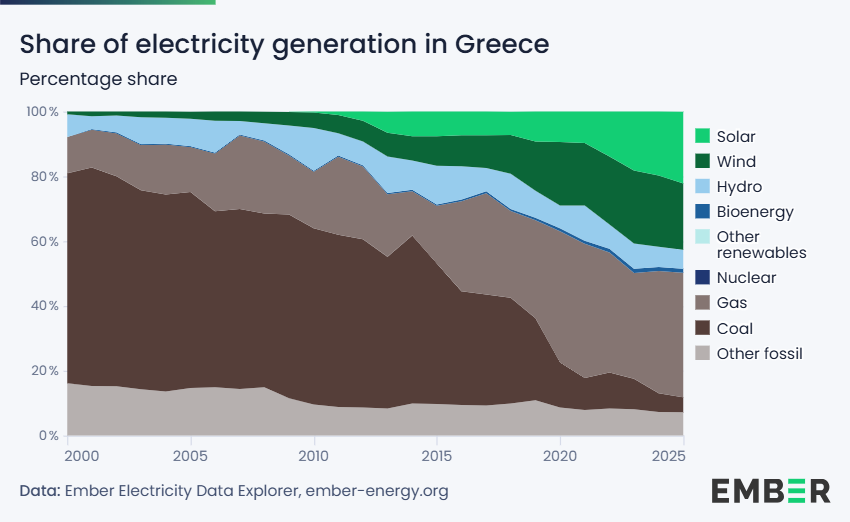
Electricity generation in Greece - percentage share

Energy production in Greece is dominated by the Public Power Corporation (known mostly by its acronym ΔΕΗ, or in English DEI). In 2009 DEI supplied for 85.6% of all energy demand in Greece, while the number fell to 77.3% in 2010. Almost half (48%) of DEI's power output is generated using lignite, a drop from the 51.6% in 2009. Another 12% comes from Hydroelectric power plants and another 20% from natural gas. Between 2009 and 2010, independent companies' energy production increased by 56%, from 2,709 Gigawatt hour in 2009 to 4,232 GWh in 2010.

In 2008 renewable energy accounted for 8% of the country's total energy consumption, a rise from the 7.2% it accounted for in 2006, but still below the EU average of 10% in 2008. 10% of the country's renewable energy comes from solar power, while most comes from biomass and waste recycling. In line with the European Commission's Directive on Renewable Energy, Greece aims to get 18% of its energy from renewable sources by 2020. In 2013 and for several months, Greece produced more than 20% of its electricity from renewable energy sources and hydroelectric power plants. Greece currently does not have any nuclear power plants in operation, however in 2009 the Academy of Athens suggested that research in the possibility of Greek nuclear power plants begin.

Greece had 10 million barrels of proven oil reserves as of 1 January 2012. Hellenic Petroleum is the country's largest oil company, followed by Motor Oil Hellas. Greece's oil production stands at 1,751 barrels per day (bbl/d), ranked 95th worldwide, while it exports 19,960 bbl/d, ranked 53rd, and imports 355,600 bbl/d, ranked 25th.

In 2011 the Greek government approved the start of oil exploration and drilling in three locations within Greece, with an estimated output of 250 to 300 million barrels over the next 15 to 20 years. The estimated output in euros of the three deposits is €25 billion over a 15-year period, of which €13–€14 billion will enter state coffers. Greece's dispute with Turkey over the Aegean poses substantial obstacles to oil exploration in the Aegean Sea.

In addition to the above, Greece is also to start oil and gas exploration in other locations in the Ionian Sea, as well as the Libyan Sea, within the Greek exclusive economic zone, south of Crete. The Ministry of the Environment, Energy and Climate Change announced that there was interest from various countries (including Norway and the United States) in exploration, and the first results regarding the amount of oil and gas in these locations were expected in the summer of 2012. In November 2012, a report published by Deutsche Bank estimated the value of natural gas reserves south of Crete at €427 billion.

A number of oil and gas pipelines are currently under construction or under planning in the country. Such projects include the Interconnector Turkey-Greece-Italy (ITGI) and South Stream gas pipelines.

EuroAsia Interconnector will electrically connect Attica and Crete in Greece with Cyprus and Israel with 2000 MW HVDC undersea power cable. EuroAsia Interconnector is specially important for isolated systems, like Cyprus and Crete. Crete is energetically isolated from mainland Greece and Hellenic Republic covers for Crete electricity costs difference of around €300 million per year.

In April 2026 following the energy crisis, due to the 2026 Iran war, the government introduced a €300 million fuel subsidy package. It aimed to help households and farmers with the rising energy prices. The package includes cuts to diesel prices, fuel vouchers for consumers, and financial support for farmers and ferry operators. By this the hope to ease the cost of living within Greece.

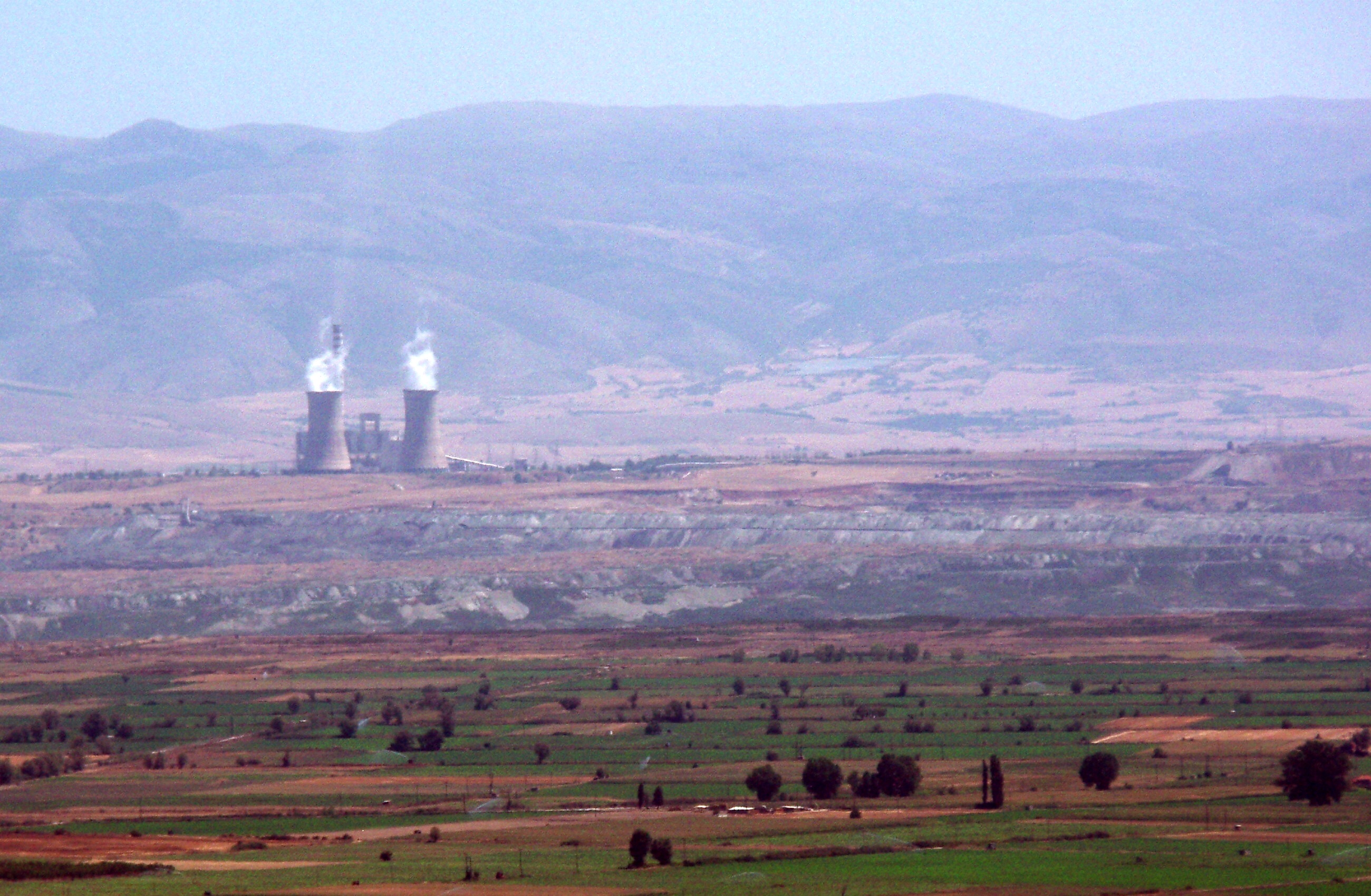
Amyntaio Power Plant

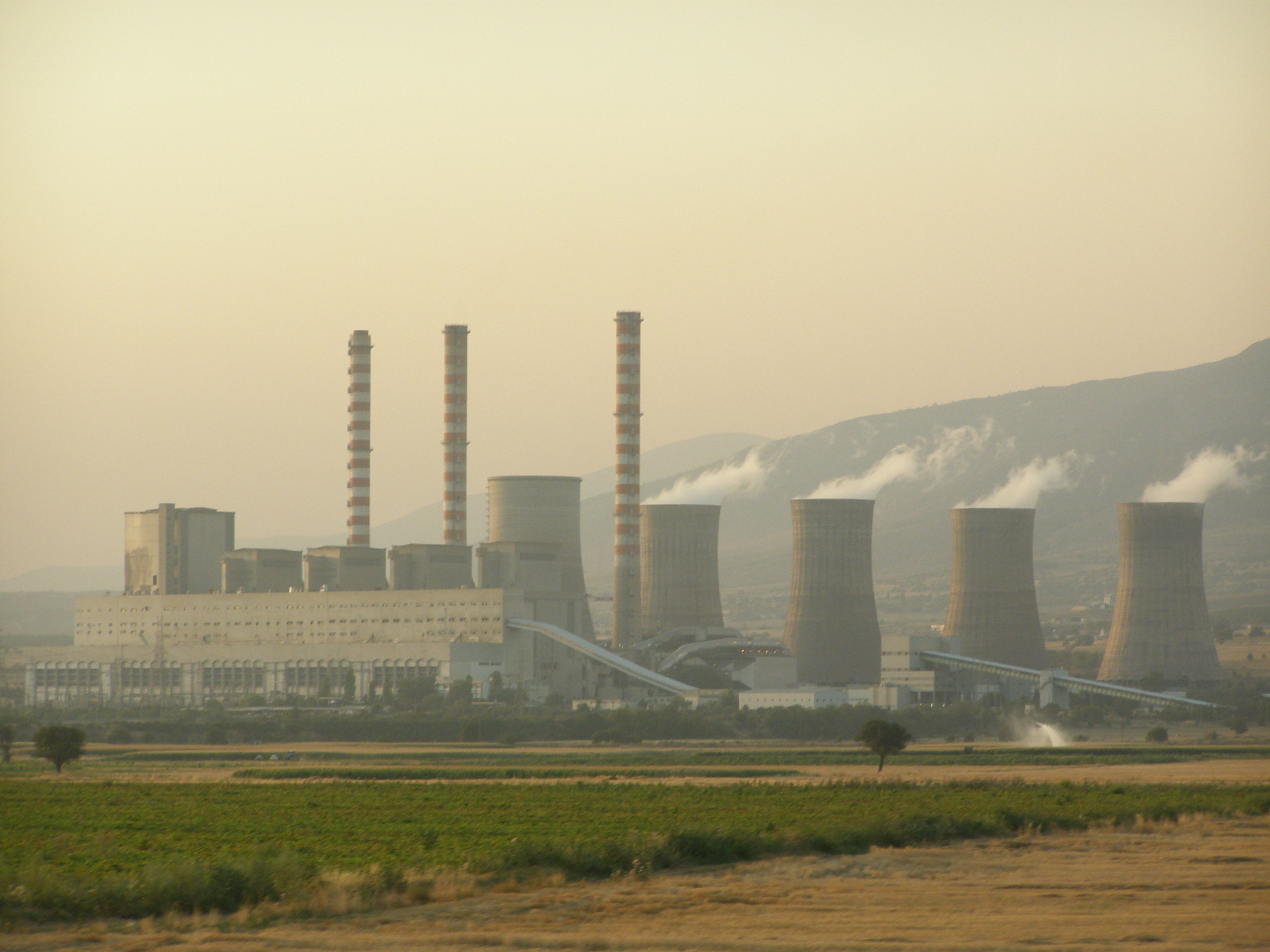
Agios Dimitrios Power Plant

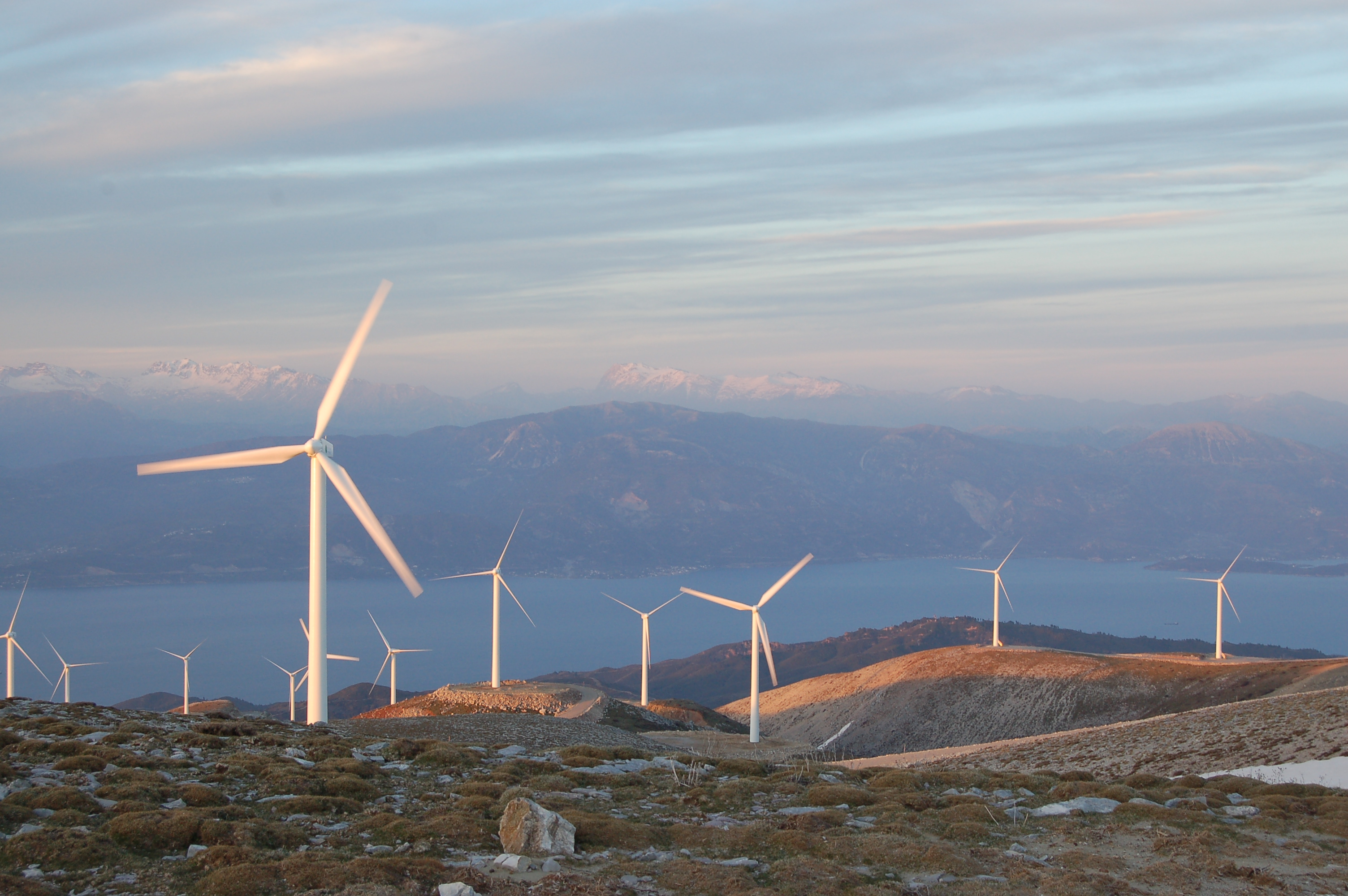
View of a wind farm, Panachaiko mountain

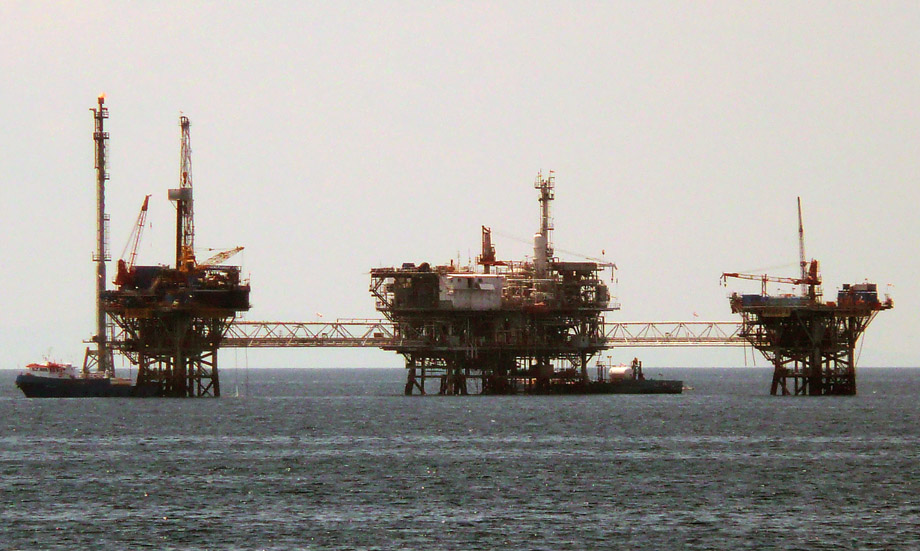
Prinos oil field near Kavala

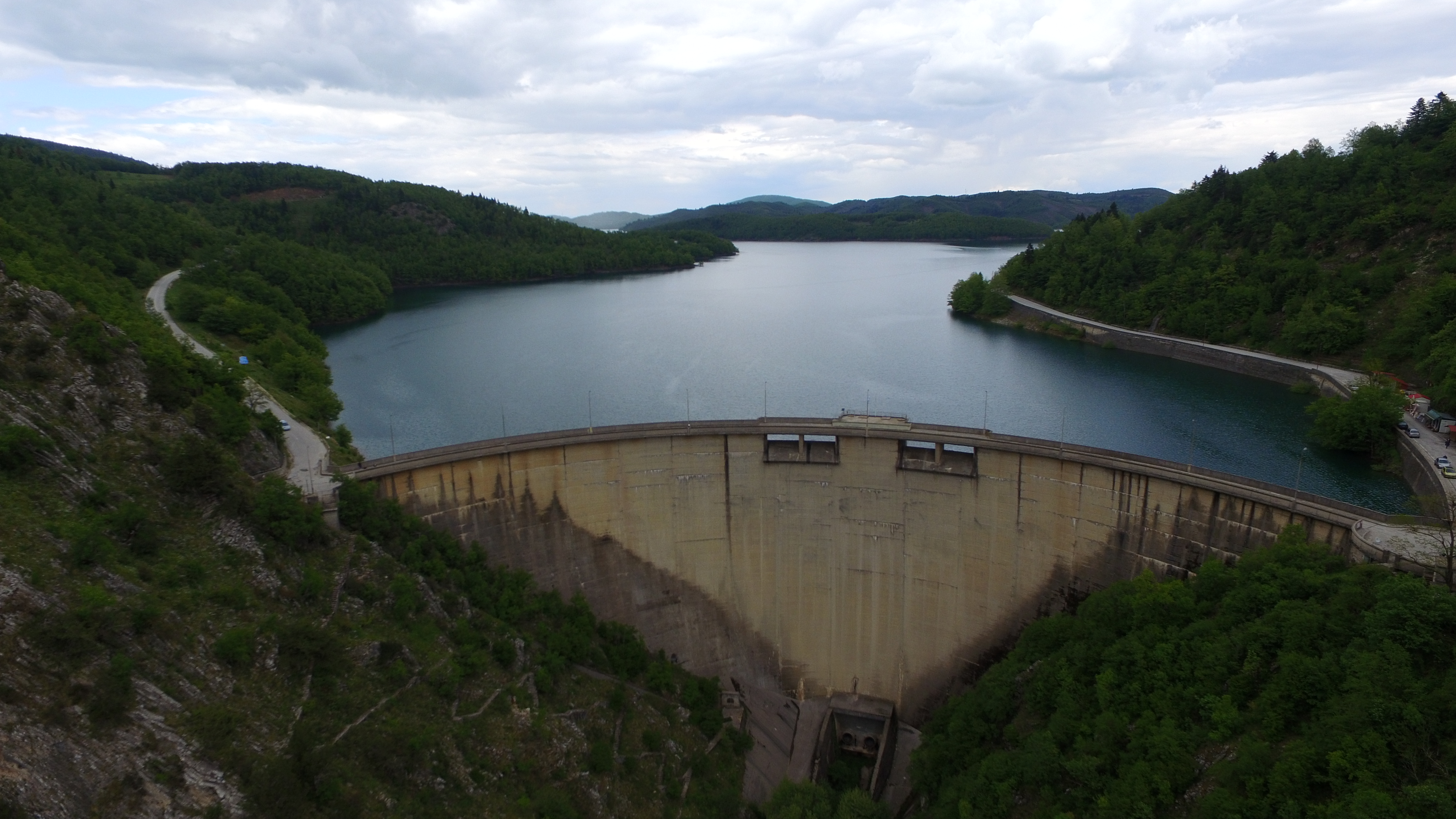
Plastiras Hydroelectric Dam

=== Water supply and sanitation ===
Water supply and sanitation in Greece is characterised by diversity. While Athens receives its water from a series of reservoirs, some of which are located 200 km away, some small islands are supplied with water from tankers. Greeks have suffered from repeated droughts, the most recent one occurring in 2007. The EU supported the construction of numerous wastewater treatment plants since the 1990s, in order to achieve EU environmental standards. While the wastewater discharge of the biggest cities is now in compliance with these standards, some smaller towns still lag behind.

Two state utilities, EYDAP in Athens and EYATH in Thessaloniki, are in charge of water supply and sanitation for about half the population. These publicly traded companies post profits despite low tariffs, partly due to investment subsidies from the state. Outside the two largest cities, 230 different municipal utilities are in charge of water supply and sanitation. As part of the so-called Kallikratis plan for local government reform, smaller municipalities and municipal utilities are to be merged into larger units. The Greek financial crisis is making it difficult for Greek utilities to increase tariffs, to enforce payment of arrears and to service their debt.

== Taxation and government finances ==
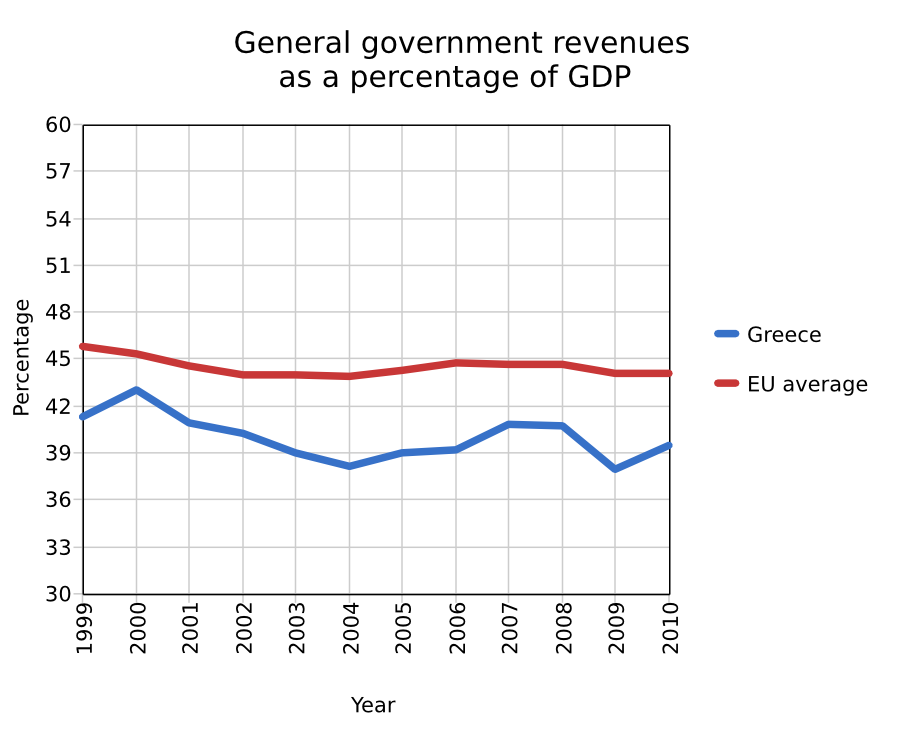
Revenues of Greece between 1999 and 2010 as a percentage of GDP, compared to the EU average.

Greece has a tiered tax system based on progressive taxation. Greek law recognizes six categories of taxable income: immovable property, movable property (investment), income from agriculture, business, employment, and income from professional activities. Greece's personal income tax rate, until recently, ranged from 0% for annual incomes below €12,000 to 45% for annual incomes over €100,000. Under the new 2010 tax reform, tax exemptions have been abolished.

Also under the new austerity measures and among other changes, the personal income tax-free ceiling has been reduced to €5,000 per annum while further future changes, for example abolition of this ceiling, are already being planned.

Greece's corporate tax dropped from 40% in 2000 to 20% in 2010. For 2011 only, corporate tax was at 24%. Value added tax (VAT) has gone up in 2010 compared to 2009: 23% as opposed to 19%.

The lowest VAT possible is 6.5% (previously 4.5%) for newspapers, periodicals and cultural event tickets, while a tax rate of 13% (from 9%) applies to certain service sector professions. Additionally, both employers and employees have to pay social contribution taxes, which apply at a rate of 16% for white collar jobs and 19.5% for blue collar jobs, and are used for social insurance. In 2017 the VAT tax rate was 24% with minor exceptions, 13% reduced for some basic foodstuffs which will be soon abolished and everything, as it seems, will soon go to 24% in order to fight the phantom of tax evasion.

The Ministry of Finance expected tax revenues for 2012 to be €52.7 billion (€23.6 billion in direct taxes and €29.1 billion in indirect taxes), an increase of 5.8% from 2011. In 2012, the government was expected to have considerably higher tax revenues than in 2011 on a number of sectors, primarily housing (an increase of 217.5% from 2011).

=== Tax evasion ===
Historically, high levels of tax evasion and a large informal economy constituted major structural challenges for public finances in Greece. A 2009 study by researchers from the University of Chicago estimated tax evasion by self-employed professionals alone at €28 billion, equivalent to 31% of that year's budget deficit. During the Greek government-debt crisis, Greece's shadow economy was estimated at roughly 24 percent of GDP, while uncollected VAT (the VAT compliance gap) stood at 28 percent of owed revenue in 2014—nearly double the European Union average.

=== Anti-evasion reforms and digitalisation ===
Beginning in the late 2010s, successive governments and the Independent Authority for Public Revenue (IAPR/AADE) implemented extensive regulatory and digital reforms to curb tax evasion and expand electronic payments. Following a bilateral agreement ratified in 2016, Greece and Switzerland began the automatic exchange of financial account information in 2018 under OECD standards, closing a major avenue for undeclared offshore holdings. Domestically, mandatory point of sale (POS) terminals were introduced across retail and service professions starting in 2017 alongside tax incentives linking tax-free thresholds to electronic spending, culminating in 2024 with the mandatory real-time interconnection of all cash registers with POS terminals to prevent unrecorded transactions.

Tax administration was further modernized through the rollout of the myDATA digital bookkeeping platform, requiring businesses to transmit revenue, expense, and payroll records electronically to AADE in real time to enable pre-filled VAT and income tax returns. Mandatory business-to-business (B2B) electronic invoicing was phased in throughout 2026 alongside AI-assisted auditing tools, while a minimum presumptive taxable income framework was introduced in 2024 for self-employed professionals and sole proprietorships to address chronic under-reporting of profits. As a result of these measures, the European Commission reported that Greece recorded the steepest reduction in its VAT compliance gap among EU member states, falling from 28% in 2014 to 9.5% in recent estimates, while generating over €2 billion annually in additional tax revenues from anti-evasion compliance.

Greece — VAT Compliance Gap vs. EU Average
% of VAT Total Tax Liability (VTTL)

Metric / Period Gap (%)

2014 (Pre-Reform Baseline)
Greece (2014)28.0%
EU average (2014)14.0%
Recent Estimate (Post-myDATA & POS)
Greece (recent est.)9.5%
EU average (recent est.)9.5%
Reduction of uncollected VAT in Greece following digital tax compliance reforms (myDATA, POS integration). Source: European Commission (VAT Gap in Europe Report).

=== Corruption ===
Corruption in Greece is considered to be significant, with the country ranking as one of the most corrupt in the European Union according to the Corruption Perception Index. Transparency International stated in 2012 that corruption had played a major role in causing the Greek financial crisis. Tax evasion was described by Greek politicians as "a national sport"—with up to €30 billion per year going uncollected, according to a 2012 estimate. A 2016 estimate indicated that between €11 billion and €16 billion per annum were not collectable. Other significant amounts were uncollected due to VAT (sales tax) fraud and smuggling. In 2016, the OECD, Greece and the European Commission launched a project to increase integrity and reduce corruption in Greece through the technical empowerment of the Greek authorities for the implementation of Greece's National Anti-Corruption Action Plan (NACAP).

Political corruption is also acknowledged as a significant problem by many observers.

The government's anti-corruption efforts have been evaluated as ineffective, according to several sources, which has been attributed to poor enforcement of anti-corruption legislation and the ineffectiveness of anti-corruption agencies. Anti-corruption agencies have been hindered by excessive political influence and continuous replacement of staff. Recent involvement of high-ranking public officials in corruption cases has been reported in the media.

== Living standards and social welfare ==
Living standards in Greece have been shaped by long-term trends in wages, poverty, social exclusion, and demographic change. These factors continue to influence the economic well-being of households across the country.

=== Wages and purchasing power ===
Nominal wages in Greece have increased in recent years, although real incomes remain below the European Union average. According to the ERGANI labour-market information system, the average gross monthly salary rose from €1,046 in 2019 to €1,342 in 2024. The median annual income for full-time employees was approximately €17,954 in 2024, ranking among the lowest in the EU. Rising living costs, particularly for energy and essential goods, have limited improvements in households’ purchasing power.

=== Poverty, social exclusion and demographic pressures ===
Despite economic recovery, levels of poverty and social exclusion remain significant. The Hellenic Statistical Authority reported that 26.9 percent of the population, about 2.74 million people, were at risk of poverty or social exclusion in 2024, a slight increase from 2023. Severe material and social deprivation affected 14.0 percent of the population in the same year. High housing and energy costs have been identified as major contributing factors.

Demographic trends place additional pressure on social welfare systems. Greece’s population declined from about 11.1 million in 2010 to 10.4 million in 2024, while the proportion of residents aged 65 and over rose to 23.3 percent. These developments have implications for pensions, healthcare services, and the country’s labour force, with potential effects on future living standards and inequality.

=== National and regional GDP ===
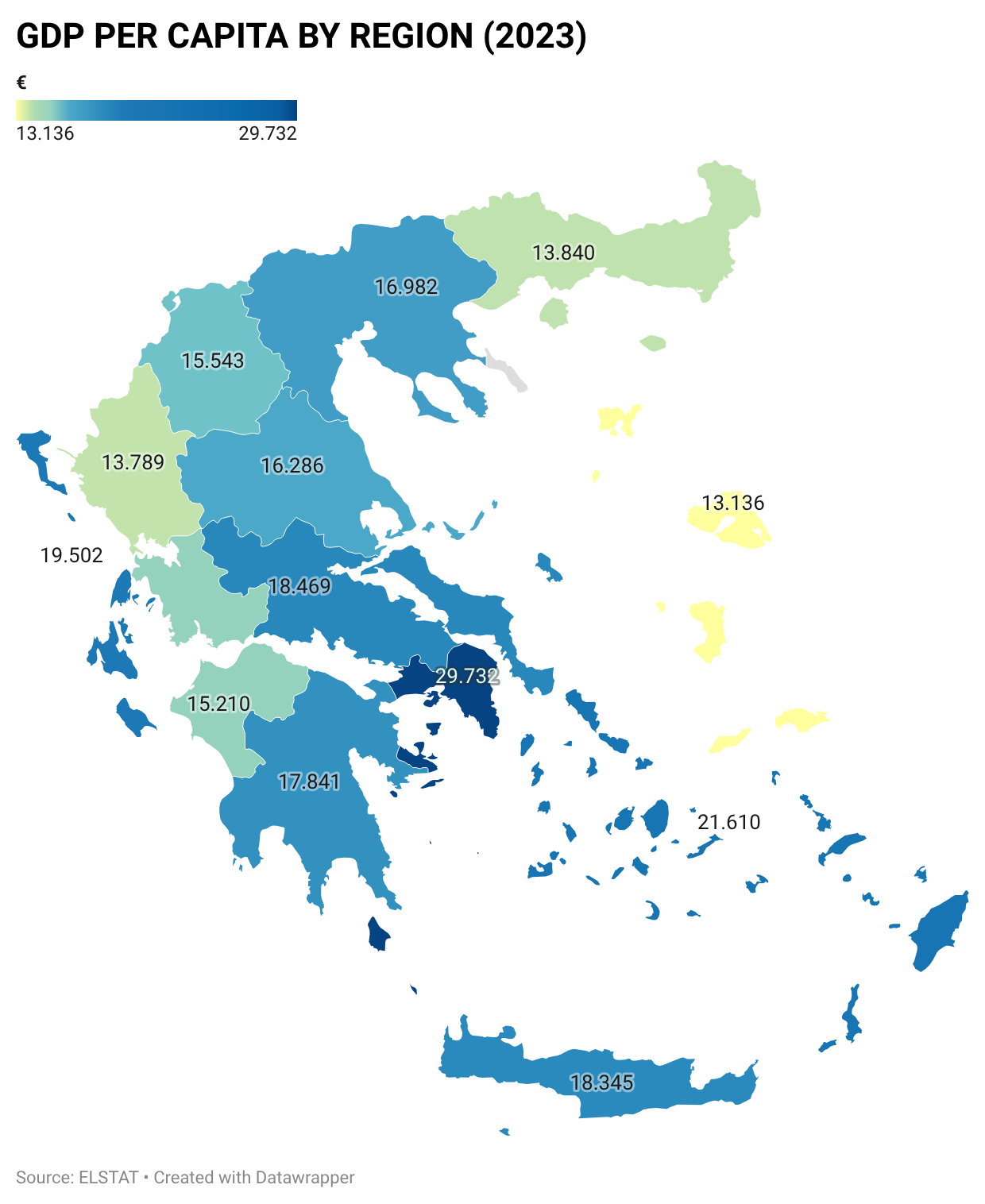
GR GDP PER_CAPITA BY REGION 2023

The country's two largest metropolitan areas account for almost 62% of the national economy.

For 2023, Greece's regional economic landscape continues to be characterized by a significant concentration of wealth. Attica remains the dominant economic powerhouse, contributing €109.117 billion to the national GDP, followed by Central Macedonia with €31.621 billion. The smallest regional economies were those of the North Aegean (€2.934 billion) and Ionian Islands (€4.111 billion).

In terms of GDP per capita, Attica (€29,732) far outranks any other Greek region, representing approximately 140% of the national average. The poorest regions in 2023 were the North Aegean (€13,136), Epirus (€13,789), and Eastern Macedonia and Thrace (€13,840). At the national level, GDP per capita in 2023 rose to €21,301 in current prices.

Regional Economic Profile of Greece (2023)
Rank	Region	GDP (€ bn)	Share (%)	GDP per Capita (€)	vs National Mean
1	Attica	109.117	48.8%	29,732	139.6%
2	Central Macedonia	31.621	14.1%	16,982	79.7%
3	South Aegean	7.218	3.2%	21,610	101.4%
4	Ionian Islands	4.111	1.8%	19,502	91.5%
5	Central Greece	9.431	4.2%	18,469	86.7%
6	Crete	11.455	5.1%	18,345	86.1%
7	Peloponnese	10.421	4.7%	17,841	83.8%
8	Thessaly	11.528	5.1%	16,286	76.5%
9	Western Macedonia	3.844	1.7%	15,543	73.0%
10	Western Greece	9.412	4.2%	15,210	71.4%
11	Eastern Macedonia and Thrace	7.821	3.5%	13,840	65.0%
12	Epirus	4.412	2.0%	13,789	64.7%
13	North Aegean	2.934	1.3%	13,136	61.7%
—	TOTAL	223.755	100.0%	21,301	100.0%

Source: Hellenic Statistical Authority (ELSTAT), December 2024 Release.

=== Welfare state ===
Greece maintains a welfare state providing universal health care through the National Healthcare Service (ESY), alongside public pensions and social welfare benefits administered primarily by the Unified Social Security Fund (e-EFKA) and the Organisation of Welfare Benefits and Social Solidarity (OPEKA).

According to Eurostat data, Greece's social protection system is heavily weighted toward old-age and survivors' pensions, which accounted for 62.3% of total social protection benefits in 2024, the highest share in the European Union and well above the EU average of 47.0%. Under the 2026 Greek state budget, total allocations for social protection and public health stand at approximately €54.6 billion (€47.08 billion for social protection and €7.48 billion for healthcare), supported by €32.5 billion in annual social security contributions alongside state budget transfers.

== Largest companies by revenue 2026 ==
According to the 2026 Forbes Global 2000 index, Greece's largest publicly traded companies are:

Greece — Forbes Global 2000 (2026)
#	Global Rank	Company	Revenue ($B)	Profit ($B)	Assets ($B)	Market Value ($B)
1	862	Eurobank	6.59	1.58	124.45	15.57
2	983	National Bank of Greece	3.84	1.31	95.29	14.43
3	1,078	Piraeus Bank	4.35	1.24	103.72	11.87
4	1,248	Alpha Bank	5.29	0.99	90.97	9.50
5	1,523	PPC	11.10	0.53	32.70	8.01
6	1,693	Motor Oil Hellas	12.96	0.73	9.44	4.48

The ranking reflects the dominance of the banking and energy sectors among Greece's publicly listed corporations. While the four systemic banks lead in total assets, profitability, and market capitalization, energy and refining groups generate the highest annual revenues in the domestic market led by Motor Oil Hellas ($12.96 billion) and the Public Power Corporation ($11.10 billion) among the companies listed above. Because the Forbes Global 2000 covers exclusively publicly traded companies and uses a composite scoring methodology, major privately held Greek enterprises, such as supermarket chain Sklavenitis, as well as energy group Helleniq Energy (which ranks first nationally by turnover but fell outside the top 2,000 cutoff in 2026) are not represented in the table.

== Labour force ==
=== Working hours ===
According to Eurostat, Greece recorded the longest average actual work week in the European Union in 2025, at 39.6 hours per week compared to the EU average of 35.9 hours. In 2024, 12.4 percent of employed people aged 20–64 worked 49 or more hours per week in their main job nearly double the EU average of 6.6 percent primarily reflecting the high share of self-employed workers, agricultural producers, and small-business owners in the Greek economy. On an annual basis, OECD data indicate that average actual hours worked per worker declined from 2,124 hours in 2014 to 1,874 hours in 2025, ranking fourth-highest among OECD member states.

Regarding employment arrangements, the overwhelming majority of the Greek workforce is employed full-time. While part-time employment rose during the sovereign debt crisis from 7.7 percent of total employment in 2007 to 11 percent in 2016, the trend reversed during the post-pandemic economic recovery. According to the Hellenic Statistical Authority (ELSTAT), 94.9 percent of employed persons worked full-time in 2025–2026, while part-time employment fell to 5.1 percent.

In terms of labour regulation, the statutory full-time working week in Greece remains 40 hours across five days, alongside institutional reforms introduced in the 2020s to combat undeclared overtime and address labour shortages. These include the nationwide rollout of the Digital Work Card (Ψηφιακή Κάρτα Εργασίας) for real-time tracking of working hours and the 2024 legislation (Law 5053/2023) permitting an optional six-day workweek with a 40 percent daily wage premium in continuous-operation industries and businesses facing exceptional workloads.

=== Unemployment ===
Unemployment in Greece rose sharply during the sovereign debt crisis, peaking at 27.9% in 2013, before entering a sustained downward trajectory alongside the post-pandemic economic recovery. By August 2026, the seasonally adjusted unemployment rate fell to an 18-year low of 7.4%, standing at 7.6% in September 2026 (down from 8.8% in September 2025, with 359,609 unemployed persons and 4,391,208 employed. Despite this substantial reduction, Greece's unemployment rate remained slightly above the Eurozone average of 6.5% and the European Union average of 6.2% recorded in September 2026.

Significant structural disparities persist across gender, age, and unemployment duration. In September 2026, the unemployment rate for women stood at 10.5%, more than double the male rate of 5.2%. Youth unemployment (ages 15–24) declined from a crisis-era peak of nearly 60% to 17.3% in September 2026, compared to 7.0% for workers aged 25–74 and 15.4% across the Eurozone.

Additionally, long-term unemployment (12 months or more) accounted for 53.1% of all unemployed persons in the second quarter of 2026.

== Currency ==
Between 1832 and 2002 the currency of Greece was the drachma. After signing the Maastricht Treaty, Greece applied to join the eurozone. The two main convergence criteria were a maximum budget deficit of 3% of GDP and a declining public debt if it stood above 60% of GDP. Greece met the criteria as shown in its 1999 annual public account. On 1 January 2001, Greece joined the eurozone, with the adoption of the euro at the fixed exchange rate ₯340.75 to €1. However, in 2001 the euro only existed electronically, so the physical exchange from drachma to euro only took place on 1 January 2002. This was followed by a ten-year period for eligible exchange of drachma to euro, which ended on 1 March 2012.

Prior to the adoption of the euro, 64% of Greek citizens viewed the new currency positively, but in February 2005 this figure fell to 26% and by June 2005 it fell further to 20%. Since 2010 the figure has risen again, and a survey in September 2011 showed that 63% of Greek citizens viewed of the euro positively.

According to European Commission Eurobarometer surveys in 2025–2026, support for the single currency among Greek citizens has remained strong, with approximately 74% to 77% of respondents in favour of the European Economic and Monetary Union with one single currency, the euro, compared to the Eurozone average of 82% to 83%.

== Trade groups ==
Greece was a founding member of the Organisation for Economic Co-operation and Development (OECD) and of the Organization of the Black Sea Economic Cooperation (BSEC). The country joined what is now the European Union in 1981. Greece is a member of the International Monetary Fund and of the World Trade Organization, and ranked 14th globally in the KOF Globalisation Index (with a score of 83.14 out of 100) in 2023.

== Charts gallery ==
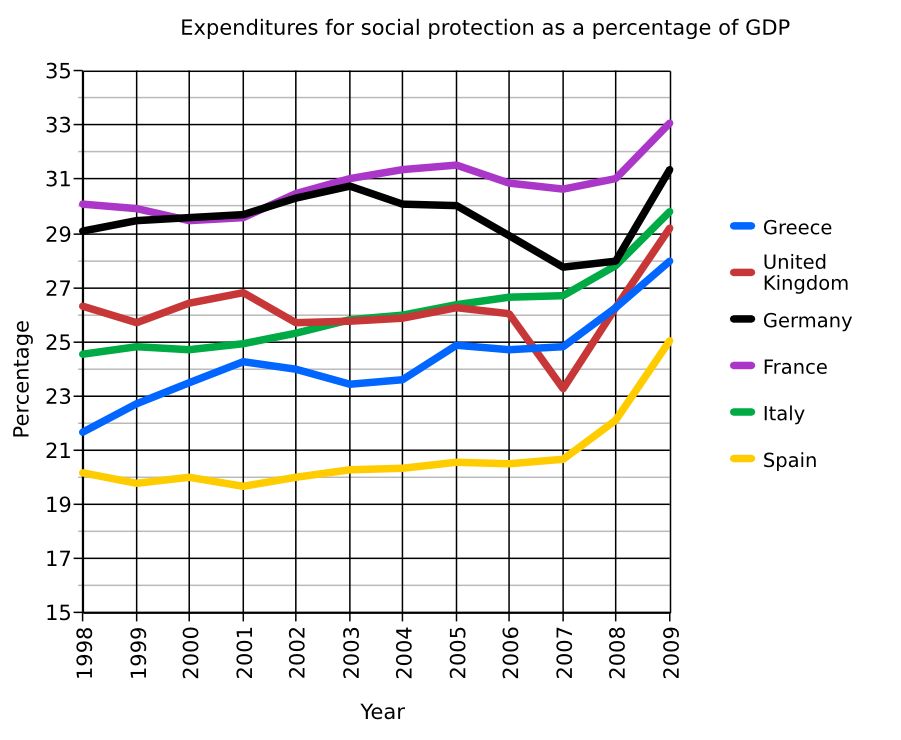
Greek social expenditures as a percentage of GDP (1998–2009)

Distribution of income in Greece over the years

Distribution of total income in Greece over the years

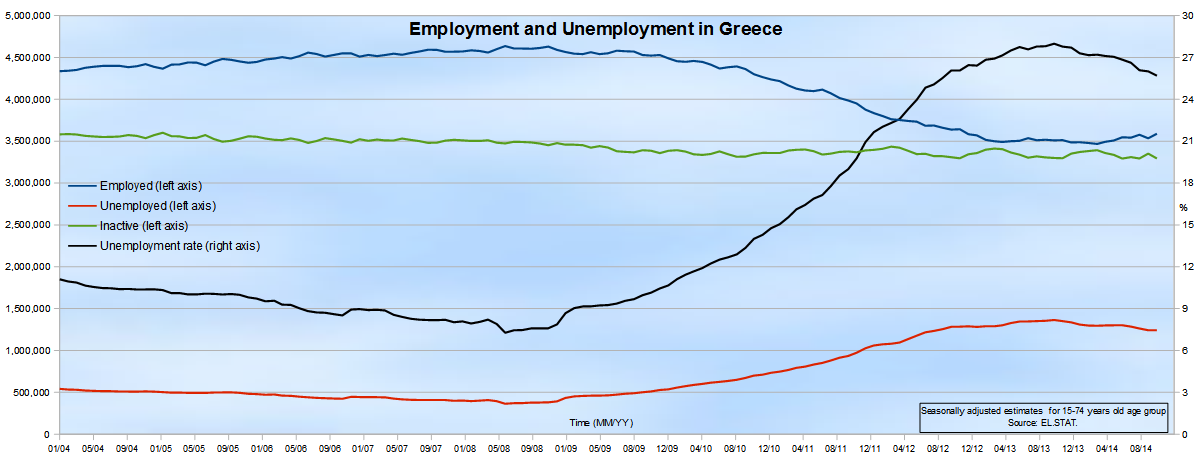
Employment and unemployment in Greece since 2004

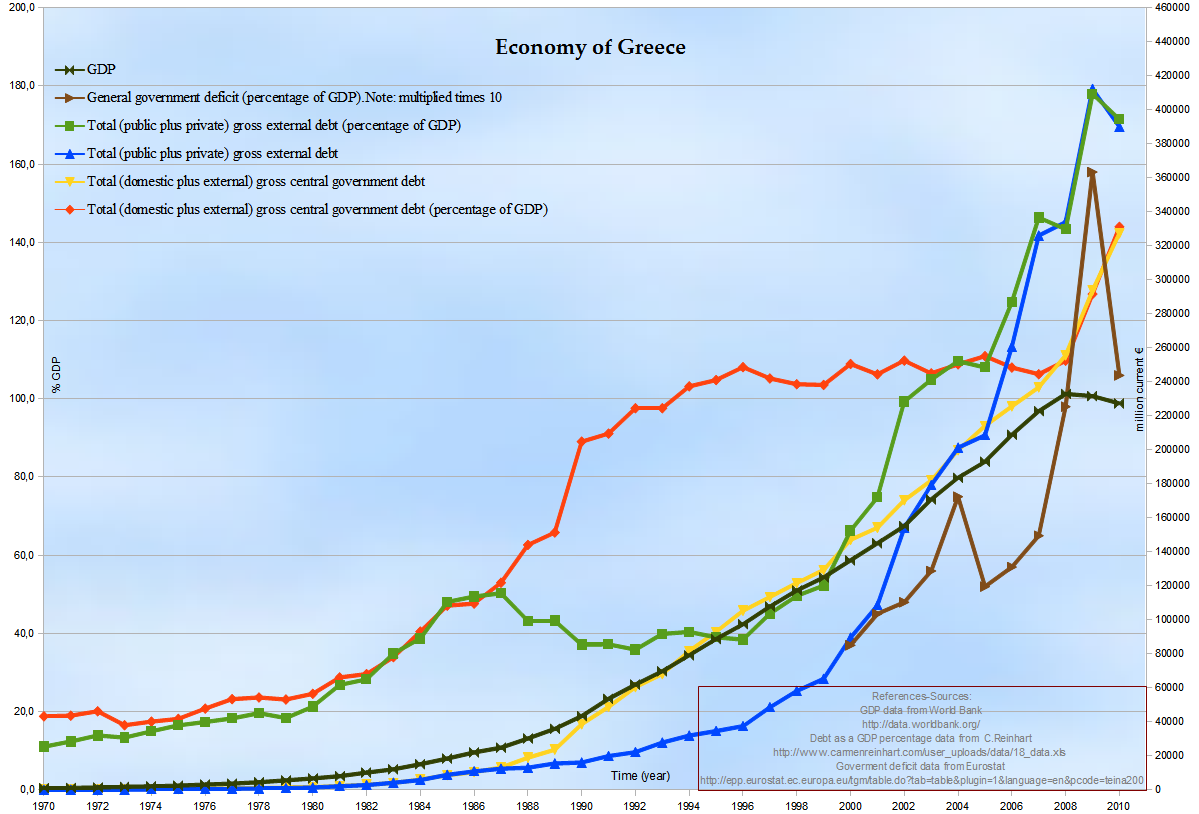
Greek GDP, Debt (various) and Budget Deficit over the years

Greek GDP, Debt and Deficit (Int. 1990 Geary-Khamis dollars)

Greek bank deposits (including repos) since 1998

Domestic bank deposits of Greek households by type of account

Domestic lending by domestic banks in Greece since 1980

House Price Index, Greece (including flats)

== Poverty rate ==
As a result of the recession sparked by the public debt crisis, poverty has increased. The rate of people at risk of poverty or social exclusion reached a high of 36% in 2014, before subsiding over the following years to 26.1% in 2023. The rate of extreme poverty rose to 15% in 2015, up from 8.9% in 2011 and a huge increase from 2009 when it did not exceed 2.2%. In 2015, the rate among children aged 0–17 was 17.6% and for young people aged 18–29 the rate was 24.4%. With unemployment on the rise, those without jobs between 2012 and 2015 were at the highest risk of poverty (70–75%), up from less than 50% in 2011. Those out of work lose their health insurance after two years, further exacerbating the poverty rate. Younger unemployed people tend to rely on the older generations of their families for financial support. However, long-term unemployment has depleted pension funds due to fewer workers making social security contributions, resulting in higher poverty rates in intergenerational households reliant on the reduced pensions received by their retired members. Over the course of the economic crisis, Greeks have endured significant job losses and wage cuts, as well as deep cuts to workers' compensation and welfare benefits. From 2008 to 2013, Greeks became 40% poorer on average, and in 2014 saw their disposable household income drop below 2003 levels.

By the late 2010s and early 2020s, Greece gradually recovered from the worst effects of the debt crisis, with unemployment and poverty rates declining compared to their peak levels. Economic growth, tourism recovery, and improving public finances contributed to a reduction in social exclusion, although living standards for many households remained below pre-crisis levels. However, new challenges emerged following the COVID-19 pandemic and the global inflation surge of 2021–2023, which increased the cost of housing, energy, and basic goods. In 2023, 26.1% of the population remained at risk of poverty or social exclusion, one of the highest rates in the European Union. Severe material and social deprivation also remained comparatively high in Greece, affecting 13.5% of the population in 2023. Despite economic recovery and falling unemployment, many Greeks continued to face financial insecurity, particularly young people, pensioners, and low-income households, reflecting the long-term social consequences of the debt crisis.

View source data.
IMF projection (%)
Actual unemployment rate (%)

== Data ==
The following table shows the main economic indicators in 1980–2021 (with IMF staff estimates in 2022–2027). Inflation below 5% is in green.

Year	GDP (bn US$ PPP)	GDP per capita (US$ PPP)	GDP (bn US$ nominal)	GDP per capita (US$ nominal)	GDP growth (real)	Inflation (%)	Unemployment (%)	Gov. debt (% of GDP)
1980	84.2	8,784.9	56.5	5,898.2	▲0.7	▲24.7	2.7	22.7
1981	▲90.7	▲9,352.6	▼52.2	▼5,377.0	▼-1.6	▲24.5	▲4.0	▲26.9
1982	▲95.2	▲9,760.8	▲54.4	▲5,576.5	▼-1.1	▲21.1	▲5.8	▲29.6
1983	▲97.9	▲9,969.0	▼49.2	▼5,008.0	▼-1.1	▲20.2	▲7.9	▲33.9
1984	▲103.5	▲10,481.7	▼47.9	▼4,854.2	▲2.0	▲18.5	▲8.1	▲40.4
1985	▲109.4	▲11,032.0	▼47.5	▼4,791.8	▲2.5	▲19.3	▼7.8	▲47.0
1986	▲112.2	▲11,278.4	▲55.9	▲5,623.2	▲0.5	▲23.0	▼7.4	▲47.5
1987	▲112.4	▼11,255.5	▲65.1	▲6,522.4	▼-2.3	▲16.4	▲7.4	▲52.9
1988	▲121.3	▲12,115.0	▲75.8	▲7,568.3	▲4.3	▲13.5	▲7.7	▲57.6
1989	▲130.9	▲13,013.5	▲78.6	▲7,812.8	▲3.8	▲13.7	▼7.5	▲60.3
1990	▲135.8	▲13,416.8	▲97.1	▲9,597.7	—N/a	▲20.4	▼7.0	▲73.8
1991	▲144.7	▲14,089.5	▲104.7	▲10,196.2	▲3.1	▲19.5	▲7.7	▲75.3
1992	▲149.1	▲14,378.8	▲115.5	▲11,139.4	▲0.7	▲15.9	▲8.7	▲80.6
1993	▲150.2	▲14,395.6	▼108.1	▼10,363.6	▼-1.6	▲14.4	▲9.7	▲101.1
1994	▲156.4	▲14,912.9	▲115.7	▲11,029.1	▲2.0	▲10.9	▼9.6	▼99.1
1995	▲163.1	▲15,477.3	▲135.8	▲12,887.9	▲2.1	▲8.8	▲10.0	▲99.8
1996	▲170.8	▲16,131.6	▲144.6	▲13,660.5	▲2.9	▲7.9	▲10.3	▲102.2
1997	▲181.5	▲17,079.6	▼142.1	▼13,370.3	▲4.5	▲5.4	10.3	▼100.3
1998	▲190.7	▲17,837.2	▲143.4	▲13,412.6	▼3.9	▲4.5	▲11.2	▼98.3
1999	▲199.4	▲18,549.7	▲148.2	▲13,784.4	▼3.1	▲2.1	▲12.1	▲99.7
2000	▲211.9	▲19,662.6	▼131.1	▼12,164.7	▲3.9	▲2.9	▼11.4	▲105.8
2001	▲225.6	▲20,819.6	▲135.2	▲12,473.3	▲4.1	▲3.6	▼10.8	▲108.0
2002	▲238.1	▲21,868.1	▲153.2	▲14,065.8	▼3.9	▲3.9	▼10.4	▼105.8
2003	▲256.9	▲23,532.4	▲200.6	▲18,378.3	▲5.8	▲3.5	▼9.8	▼102.3
2004	▲277.1	▲25,330.0	▲238.8	▲21,829.5	▲5.1	▲3.0	▲10.6	▲103.7
2005	▲287.5	▲26,210.1	▲245.9	▲22,417.6	▲0.6	▲3.5	▼10.0	▲108.3
2006	▲313.1	▲28,455.7	▲271.3	▲24,648.9	▲5.7	▲3.3	▼9.0	▼104.5
2007	▲332.1	▲30,095.9	▲316.3	▲28,656.2	▲3.3	▲3.0	▼8.4	▼104.0
2008	▲337.4	▲30,501.3	▲352.9	▲31,902.0	▼-0.3	▲4.2	▼7.8	▲110.3
2009	▼324.9	▼29,287.1	▼328.2	▼29,577.6	▼-4.3	▲1.3	▲9.6	▲127.8
2010	▼310.8	▼27,953.5	▼297.4	▼26,743.4	▼-5.5	▲4.7	▲12.7	▲147.5
2011	▼285.1	▼25,628.8	▼282.9	▼25,437.0	▼-10.1	▲3.1	▲17.9	▲184.0
2012	▼275.1	▼24,818.2	▼242.2	▼21,845.0	▼-7.1	▲1.0	▲24.4	▼162.1
2013	▲284.9	▲25,895.9	▼238.9	▼21,712.0	▼-2.5	▼-0.9	▲27.5	▲178.8
2014	▲290.0	▲26,541.3	▼235.5	▼21,554.2	▲0.5	▼-1.4	▼26.5	▲181.8
2015	▼289.6	▼26,676.0	▼195.7	▼18,023.9	▼-0.2	▼-1.1	▼24.9	▼179.1
2016	▲296.4	▲27,489.2	▼193.1	▼17,906.1	▼-0.5	0.0	▼23.6	▲183.7
2017	▲307.1	▲28,518.2	▲199.8	▲18,552.2	▲1.1	▲1.1	▼21.5	▼183.2
2018	▲319.7	▲29,761.3	▲212.1	▲19,750.7	▲1.7	▲0.8	▼19.3	▲190.7
2019	▲331.3	▲30,887.7	▼205.2	▼19,130.4	▲1.8	▲0.5	▼17.3	▼185.6
2020	▼305.0	▼28,456.6	▼188.7	▼17,603.4	▼-9.0	▼-1.3	▼16.4	▲212.4
2021	▲344.2	▲32,229.8	▲216.4	▲20,263.3	▲8.3	▲0.6	▼15.0	▼199.4
2022	▲387.8	▲36,465.5	▲222.0	▲20,875.8	▲5.2	▲9.2	▼12.6	▼177.6
2023	▲408.9	▲38,607.6	▲226.3	▲21,371.7	▲1.8	▲3.2	▼12.2	▼169.8
2024	▲426.6	▲40,441.5	▲235.3	▲22,307.3	▲2.2	▲1.6	▼11.4	▼163.8
2025	▲442.3	▲42,111.4	▲244.8	▲23,303.7	▲1.8	▲1.8	▼11.0	▼159.1
2026	▲458.0	▲43,782.8	▲254.6	▲24,339.5	▲1.6	▲1.8	▼10.7	▼154.4
2027	▲473.2	▲45,420.9	▲262.8	▲25,227.7	▲1.4	▲1.9	▼10.4	▼149.9

== See also ==
- List of companies of Greece
- List of companies listed on the Athens Stock Exchange
- List of Greek subdivisions by GDP
- List of Greeks by net worth
- Bank of Greece
- Capital controls in Greece
- Centre of Planning and Economic Research
- Council of Economic Advisers (Greece)
- Corruption in Greece
- Greece and the International Monetary Fund
- Greek withdrawal from the eurozone
- Growthfund
- Hellenic Capital Market Commission
- Hellenic Financial Stability Fund
- Hellenic Republic Asset Development Fund
- Ministry of Development (Greece)
- Ministry of Labour and Social Security (Greece)
- Ministry of National Economy and Finance (Greece)
- Trade unions in Greece
- Economy of Europe
