= Louk =

Louk may refer to:

People

- Louk Hulsman (1923–2009), Dutch criminologist
- Louk Sanders (born 1950), Dutch tennis player
- Louk Sorensen (born 1985), German-Irish tennis player
- Shani Louk (born 2001), German-Israeli tattoo artist

Other

- Loukanikos, a riot dog in the Greek protests of the early 2010s

== See also ==
- Louks
