= Kasapi Union =

Migrant worker's union

- Kasali Hellas
- Formation: 1986; 40 years ago
- Type: Union
- Headquarters: Athens, Greece
- Members: 15,000 - 20,000 (2019)
- Key people: Joe Valencia, Deborah Carlos Valencia (co-founders)

The Kasapi Union of Filipino Migrant Workers in Greece (Greek: Kasapi Hellas) is a Greek trade union founded in 1986. It advocates for workers' rights and provides social support to Filipino migrants in Greece.

== History ==
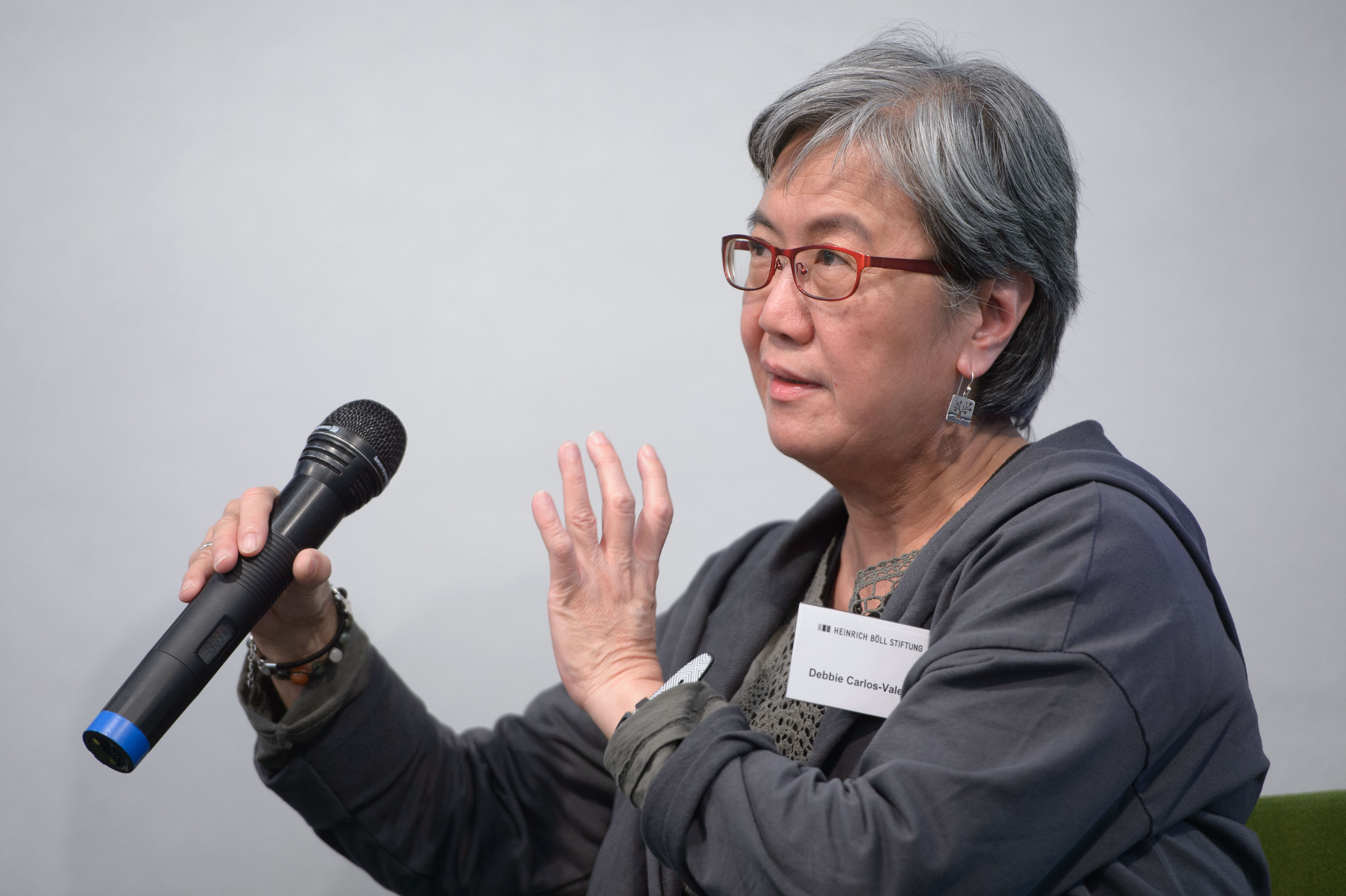
Co-founder Deborah Carlos-Valencia, 2015

Kasapi Union was founded in 1986 by Deborah Carlos Valencia, her husband Joe Valencia, and other Filipino refugees to Greece, who had fled Ferdinand Marcos. During the 1980s, Kasapi Union launched a political advocacy campaign to increase rights for second-generation Filipinos in Greece. The same decade it launched a campaign to include domestic workers in the International Labour Organization's Convention on Domestic Workers, achieving success in 2011.

In 1998, the organisation held a workers' solidarity event at Panteion University. In the mid-1990s, the union launched a campaign to enable migrants workers to become legal workers.

== Activities and membership ==
The organisation provides social support to people who became unemployed, runs childcare, provides low-interest loans and supports Filipino immigrants access legal services. With the Melissa Network, Kasapi provides support to unaccompanied refugee children traveling to Greece.

The organisation is one of the oldest Filipino associations in Greece. By 2019, it had around 15,000 to 20,000 members, mostly based in Athens, mostly women. The union's members, many of whom were fled the rule of Filipino dictator Ferdinand Marcos, are commonly politically active.

== See also ==
- Greek Council of Refugees
- Immigration to Greece
