= Youth unemployment in Greece =

Causes and measures of Greek youth unemployment

Youth unemployment in Greece focuses on the 15–24 years old age group. Greece is the sixth most youth unemployment rate in the European Union as of July 2025 with a rate of 18.9% of youths under 25 being unemployed. This is 2% higher than the EU youth unemployment rate of 14.3% in 2019. The youth unemployment rate in Greece worsened in the period after the 2008 financial crisis hitting a peak of 58.2% in 2013. While youth unemployment is high in Greece, it is far more than the adult unemployment rate in Greece which is only 17.6% as of June 2019.

== Statistics ==
Youth unemployment in Greece is tracked by the EU as all youths aged 15–24 who are not employed. As of May 2019 40.4% of youths are not employed in Greece. This youth unemployment situation was not as prevalent prior to the 2008 financial crisis with youth unemployment in Greece actually falling prior to 2008. There is not significant youth employment disparity between regions in Greece as there was in the period before 2008. Most areas within Greece have similar levels of youth unemployment and the disparity between regions has decreased since the 2008 financial crisis, however this is due to an overall increase in youth unemployment in all regions. There is also significant gender bias in youth unemployment with female Greek youths experiencing an unemployment rate higher than their male counterparts. Greece also has a significant disparity in its registered unemployment with 63.57% of all registered unemployed being women and only 36.43% being men.

== Causes ==
Greek youth unemployment was exacerbated by the 2008 financial crisis as well as the Euro area crisis, which hit Greece harder than many other countries in Europe. The EU forced Greece into austerity measures which worsened the youth unemployment crisis and joined with the worsening economy caused the "economic massacre of the young generation". The Greek economy is also hurt by a lack of productivity which was only at 35$ GDP per hour in 2009 compared to an average of 49$ in the EU. There is also a low level of workforce participation with just 66% of the employable population participating in the labor market compared to 73% in the EU-27 in 2009. The Greek economy is over-regulated and hence hurts investment in the country which hurts youth employment, and also has a lumbering public sector which strains government finances. The government debt of Greece is over 180% of GDP as of 2018 and hence has a major impact on the Greek government's finances. Greece also faces corruption issues and an ineffective judiciary which is unable to create a level economic playing field.

== Effects ==
The youth unemployment situation has also exacerbated political turmoil in Greece. In January 2015 Greece elected the populist far-left Syriza party which fought along anti-bailout, anti-austerity lines. This saw the electoral collapse of multiple establishment parties and the rise of both populist right and populist left forces as youth attempt to change the economic landscape of Greece through politics. The unemployment situation also created significant social tension as youth took to the streets to vent their anger specifically in the 2008 Greek Riots as well as the anti-Austerity protests. The youth unemployment situation has also caused a mass exodus of youth from the country mostly to other EU member states with lower unemployment levels. This has seen many engineers, doctors, and technicians leave Greece due to its economic woes.
