= Periodical and Electronic Press Union =

Greek journalists' trade union

The Periodical and Electronic Press Union (Greek: Ένωση Συντακτών Περιοδικού - Ηλεκτρονικού Τύπου, Ε.Σ.Π.Η.Τ., romanized: Énosi Syntaktón Periodikoú - Ilektronikoú Týpou, E.S.P.I.T.) is a Greek trade union for journalists employed in the weekly newspapers, magazines and electronic media in Greece.

Founded in 1959, it is a member of the Panhellenic Federation of Journalists' Unions, the European Federation of Journalists and the International Federation of Journalists.

It is the only journalists union in Greece to admit freelancers.

== See also ==
- Trade unions in Greece
