= Panhellenic Federation of Journalists' Unions =

The Panhellenic Federation of Journalists' Unions (Poesy; Greek: Πανελλήνια Ομοσπονδία Ενώσεων Συντακτών, romanized: Panellínia Omospondía Enóseon Syntaktón, Π.Ο.Ε.ΣΥ.) is a Greek trade union federation of journalists' unions.

It was founded on 12 October 1994 in Athens by 25 representatives from the following five journalist unions:

- Journalists' Union of the Athens Daily Newspapers
- Journalists' Union of Macedonia and Thrace Daily Newspapers
- Journalists' Union of the Peloponnese, Epirus and the Islands
- Journalists' Union of the Daily Newspapers of Thessaly, Central Greece and Euboea
- Periodical and Electronic Press Union

It is a member of the European Federation of Journalists and the International Federation of Journalists.

== See also ==
- Trade unions in Greece
