= Deborah Carlos-Valencia =

Filipino social worker

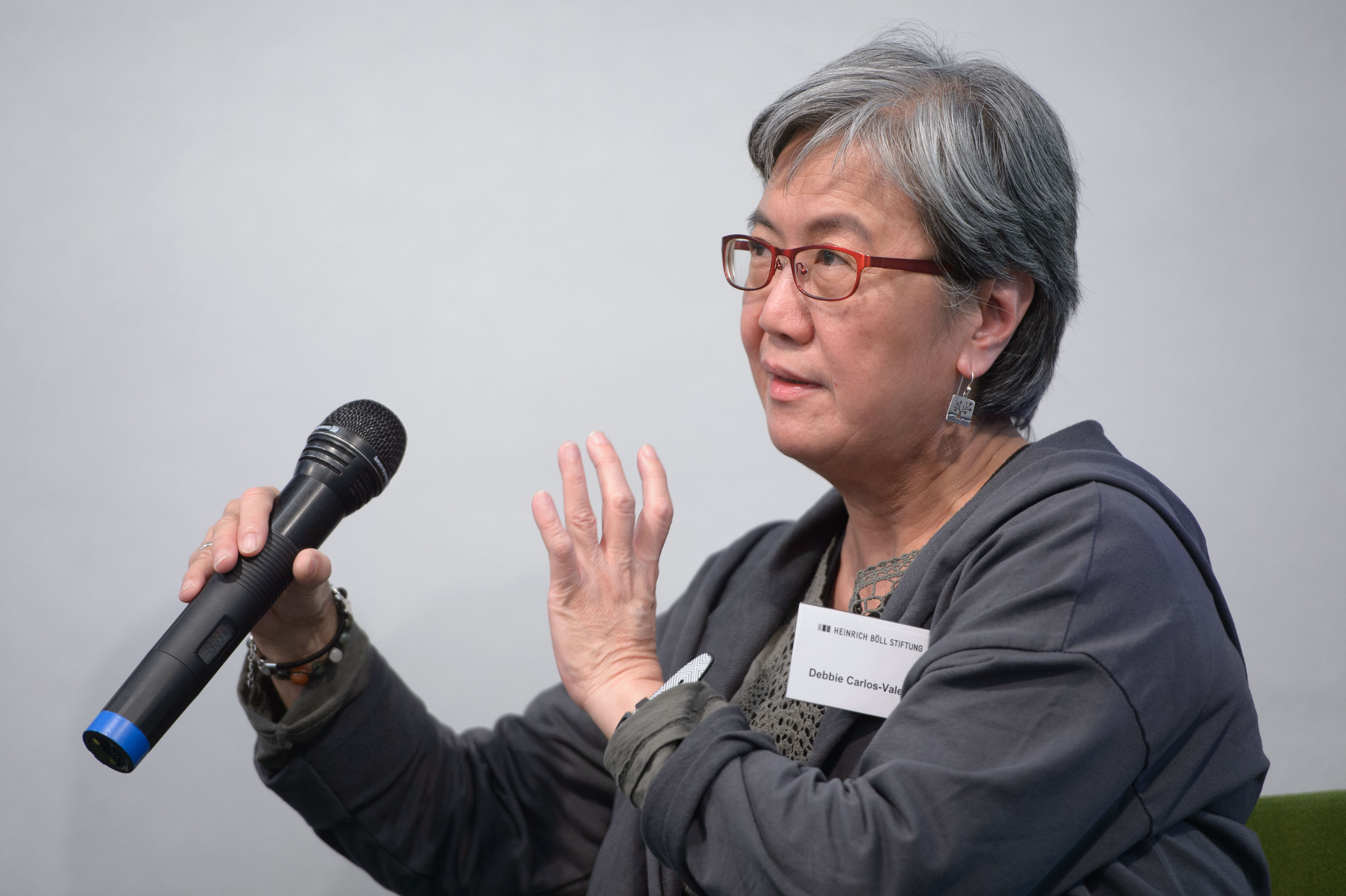
- Carlos-Valencia in 2015
- Born: 1948 or 1949 (age 77–78); Philippines
- Occupation: Social worker
- Years active: 1984 to present
- Organization(s): Kasapi Union, Melissa Network, DIWATA – The Philippine Women’s Network in Greece, BABAYLAN-Philippine Women’s Network in Europe

Deborah Carlos-Valencia (born 1948 or 1949), sometimes written as Deborah Valencia, is a Filipino social worker, feminist, founder of the Kasapi Union, and co-founder of the Melissa Network, an organization that brings together leaders of the established migrant community in Greece.

== Personal life ==
Carlos-Valencia is a Filipino feminist and community leader who fled the Philippines to Greece during the Marco dictatorship in 1985. Her husband Joe and son followed her to Greece some years later. She was aged 70 in 2019.

== Life in Philippines ==
A trade-unionist and a social worker, Carlos-Valencia had to flee the Philippines after she and her husband became involved in Workers' resistance against the Marcos dictatorship.

== Life in Greece ==
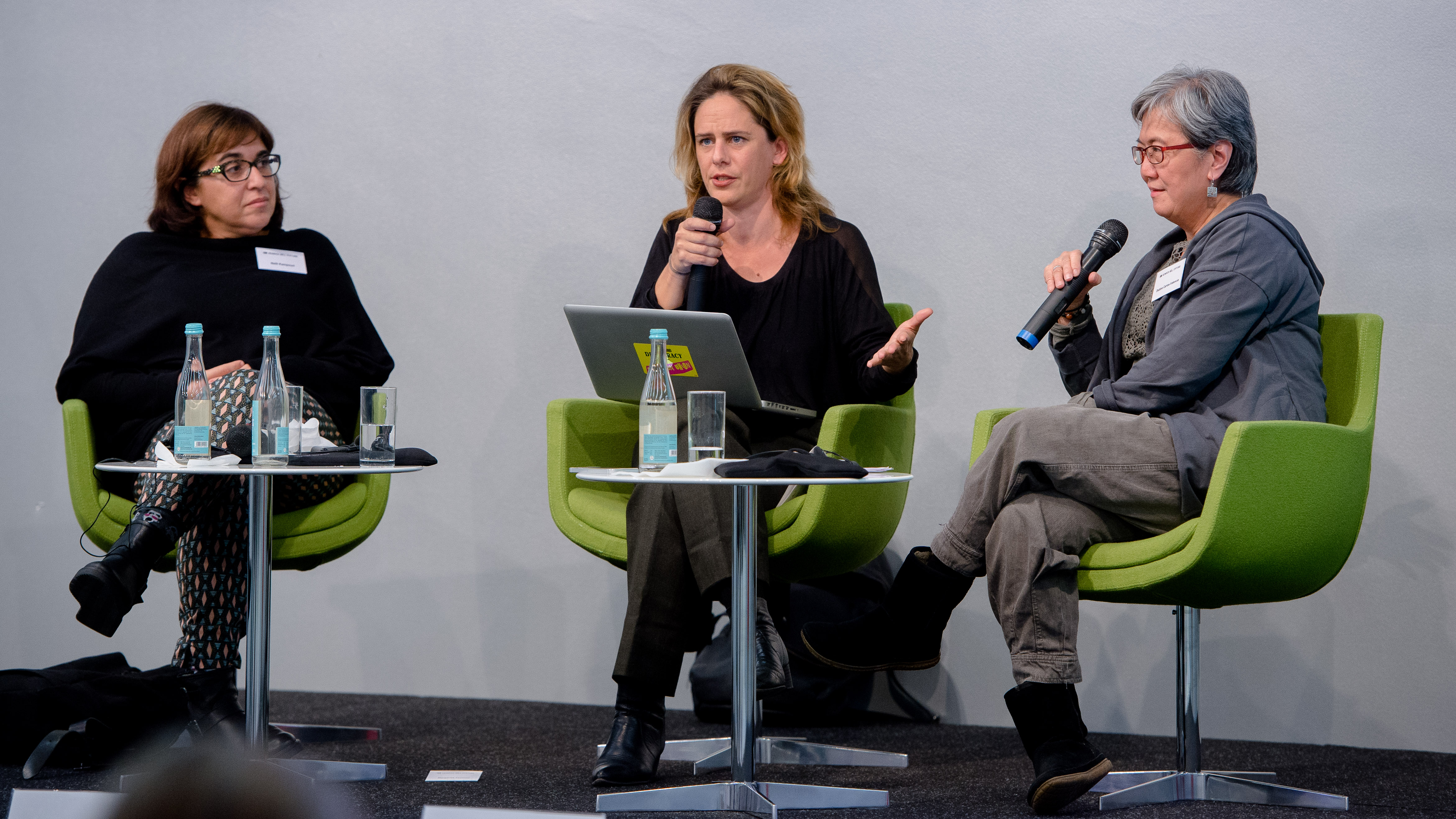
Carlos-Valencia in 2015

After arrival in Greece, Carlos-Valencia co-founded the Melissa Network in Athens in 2014 with Nadina Christopoulou. The organization serves the needs of migrant women in Greece, especially migrant domestic workers in Athens. The organization has since grown to include women from 45 countries. The organization is a based in Victoria Square in central Athens, amidst a community where far-right anti-migrant sentiment is high. Services provided include language lessons and other life skills.

In 1986, Carlos-Valencia helped found the Kasapi Union, an organisation supporting solidarity for those affected by Filipino dictator Ferdinand Marcos. In 1998, she organized a worker's solidarity event at Panteion University.

She is also helped found the DIWATA – The Philippine Women’s Network in Greece microcredit cooperative and was a founding member of BABAYLAN-Philippine Women’s Network in Europe.

Six years after her arrival in Greece, in 2020, Carlos-Valencia was one of the 2.9% of Filipinos to obtain Greek citizenship.
