= 2008 Greek riots =

Riots in response to the police killing of Alexandros Grigoropoulos

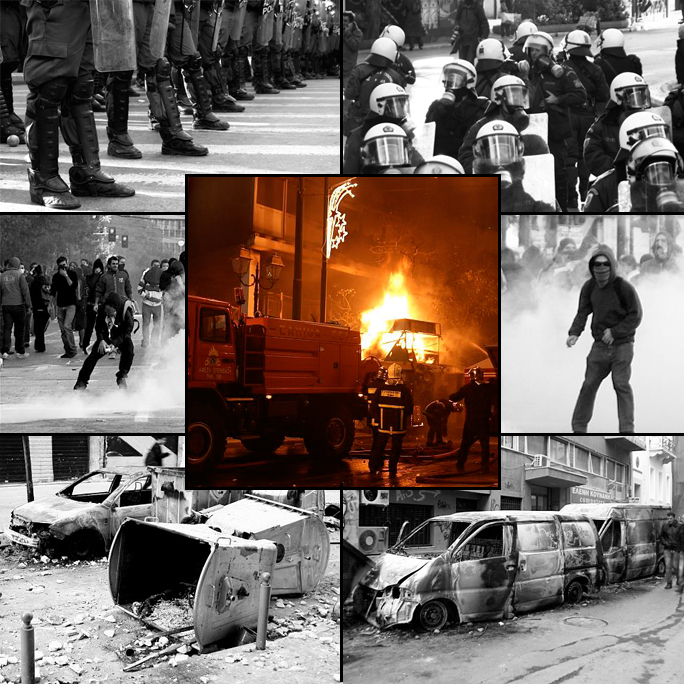
- Clockwise, from top left: riot police face protesters; police move in to contain rioting civilians; a protester defies police; burned-out vans; an abandoned barricade; and protesters retreat from tear gas
- Date: 6 December 2008 — 17 January 2009
- Location: Greece
- Caused by: Murder of Alexandros Grigoropoulos; Great Recession; Allegations of corruption; Increased unemployment
- Goals: Better standards of living for youth; Reforms against police brutality; Removal of political pressure; Protesters exploitation of the unrest
- Methods: Demonstrations; Violent protests; Strike actions; Rioting; Sit-ins; Student and youth protests; Arson
- Result: Two special guards found guilty

The 2008 Greek riots started on 6 December 2008, when Alexandros Grigoropoulos (Greek: Αλέξανδρος Γρηγορόπουλος), a 15-year-old Greek student, was killed by a special officer in Exarcheia district of central Athens. The killing of the young student by police resulted in large protests and demonstrations, which escalated to widespread rioting, with numerous rioters damaging property and engaging riot police with Molotov cocktails, stones and other objects. Demonstrations and rioting soon spread to several other cities, including Thessaloniki, the country's second-largest city, and international cities in solidarity. Newspaper Kathimerini called the rioting "the worst Greece has seen since the restoration of democracy in 1974".

While the unrest was triggered by the shooting incident, commentators described the reactions as expressing deeper causes as well, especially a widespread feeling of frustration in the younger generation about specific economic problems of the country (partly as a result of the Great Recession), a rising unemployment rate among the young generation and a perception of general inefficiency and corruption in Greek state institutions.

== The shooting incident ==
The shooting victim, Alexandros Grigoropoulos

The fatal shooting that triggered the riots and protests took place in the evening of 6 December 2008, shortly after 9 pm, in the Exarcheia district of central Athens.

According to press reports, two special guards (Ειδικοί Φρουροί) (a special category of the Greek police personnel, originally meant for guard duties on public property) had been engaged in a minor verbal clash with a small group of teenagers in a main street of Exarcheia, outside a shop. On driving away in their police car, they were then confronted by another small group at a nearby street crossing. The two guards were ordered by the Greek police center of operations to disengage immediately and withdraw from the confrontation site. However, the two guards did not comply and were later accused of insubordination. Instead, the two special guards chose to station their police vehicle outside the PASOK headquarters, left the car and went to Tzavella Street on foot, in order to confront the youngsters.

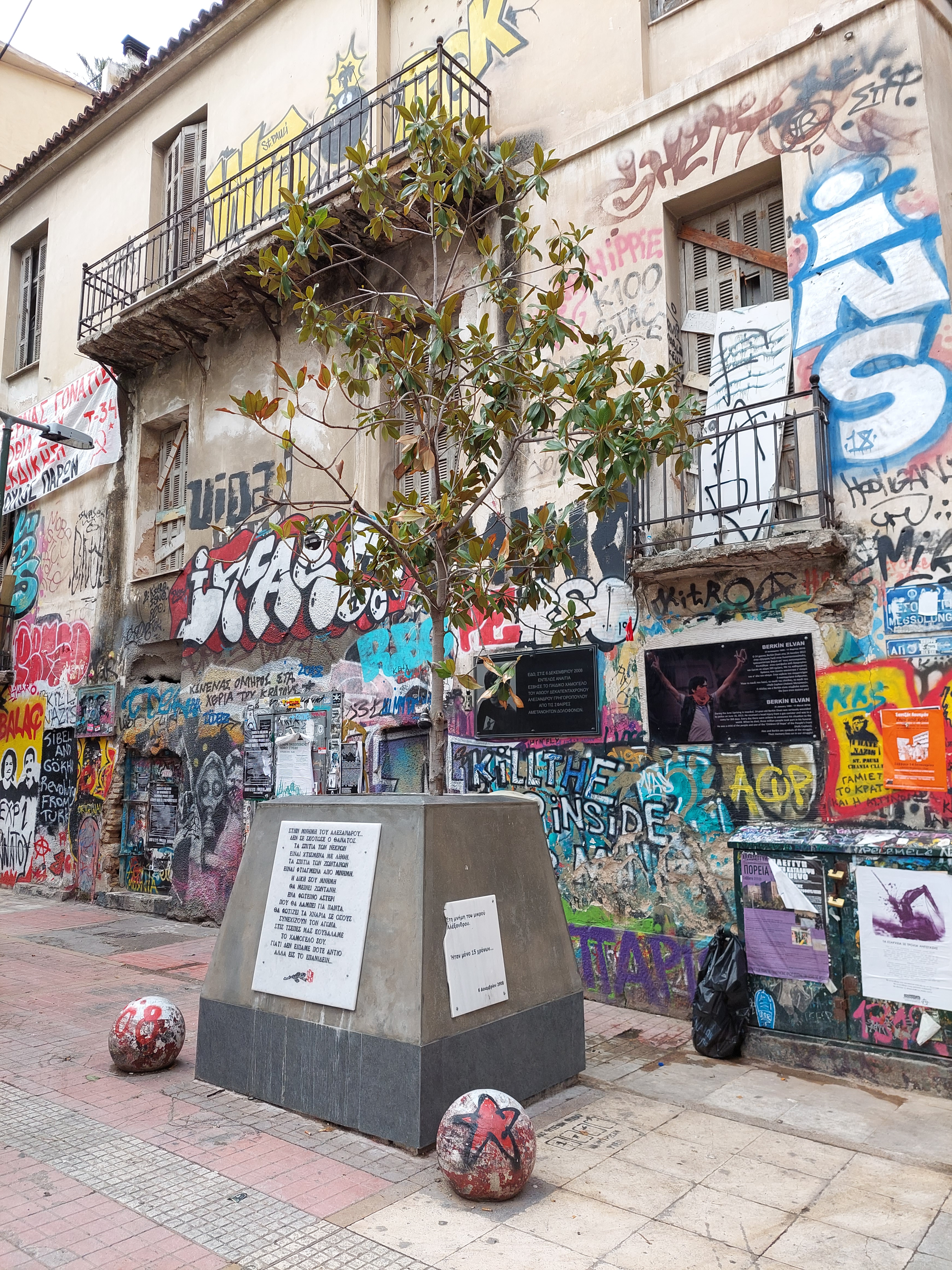
Monument for Alexis Grigoropoulos, in Exarchia (Athens, 2023)

Following some exchange of verbal abuse that, according to several witnesses, was initiated by the guards, one fired his gun. The guards said that a group of youth had thrown stones and other items at them. Eyewitnesses who spoke to Greek media, however, reported that the special guards were not attacked by the youths, nor was their physical safety put in danger at any time. Instead, the special guards approached the group and verbally assaulted them in order to provoke them. The special guard said he fired three rounds, two warning shots in the air and a third aimed on the ground. Several eyewitnesses said they believed the policeman had directly targeted the youngsters.

The victim, Alexandros – Andreas Grigoropoulos (Greek: Αλέξανδρος – Ανδρέας Γρηγορόπουλος) was a 15-year-old student, who lived in the affluent northern Athens suburb of Palaio Psychiko and attended the private Moraitis School. Immediately following the shooting, he was transported to the nearby Evangelismos Hospital where he was pronounced dead.

== Investigation of the shooting ==
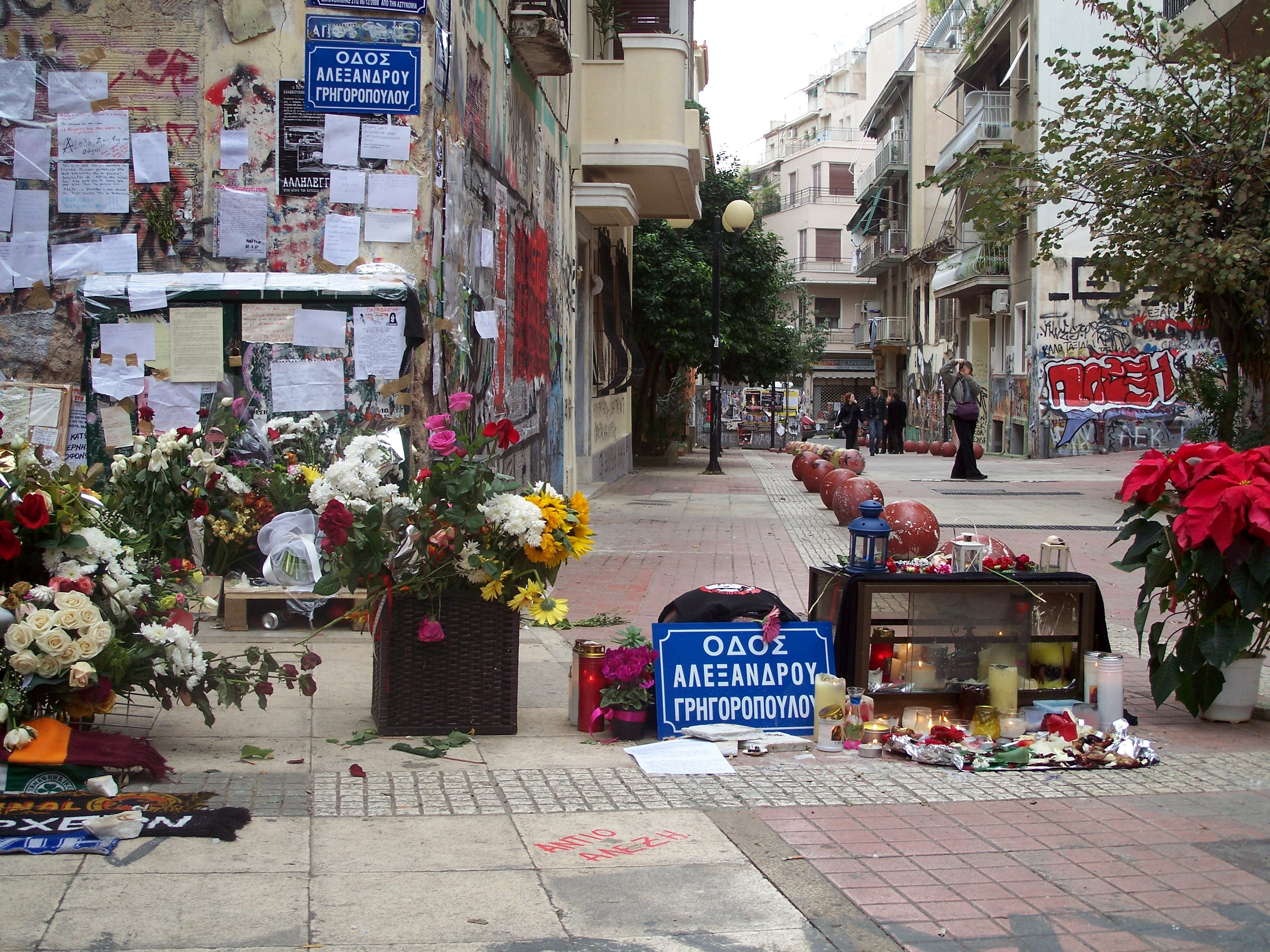
Location of Alexandros Grigoropoulos's murder on Tzavella Street.

A criminal investigation was initiated against the police officer who fired the shot, on a charge of murder ("intentional homicide" according to Greek law), while his partner was charged as an accomplice. Both were suspended from duty and were kept in detention. The defense counsel who was initially hired resigned shortly after accepting the case, citing personal reasons.

On 10 December, Alexis Kougias, counsel for the defendants, said that preliminary results of the ballistic tests apparently show that it was indeed a ricochet and that the two policemen will only appear before the public prosecutor after the forensic, toxicological, and ballistic examinations had been completed. However, the results of forensic tests indicated that the bullet that killed Grigoropoulos had entered the youth's body directly. This supported doubt on claims, by the 37-year-old policeman charged with the boy's murder, that the bullet had been fired as a warning and ricocheted. On the morning of 11 December, Dimitris Tsovolas, former MP and economic minister under the previous PASOK government, agreed to serve as the counsel for Grigoropoulos' family.

On the same day, counsel for the two policemen involved in the shooting released an explanatory statement, that described the deceased as demonstrating "deviant behaviour." According to the memorandum, Grigoropoulos was a teenager from a wealthy family, he frequented the Exarcheia district, had allegedly taken part in riotous activities that took place following the end of a basketball game two hours before he was shot, and that, in general, "the victim did not show the expected behaviour and personality of a 15-year-old adolescent." Grigoropoulos' family, friends, schoolmates and high school teachers immediately condemned those statements and declared in public that the allegations in the defendants' memorandum are "completely inaccurate" and "insulting"; the private school Grigoropoulos attended also issued a public statement that denies all the allegations. Kougias' stance, as well as his comments in the explanatory memorandum, forced the Athens bar association to initiate disciplinary proceedings against him.

On 15 December, Kougias appealed for the two defendants to be released from custody, on the grounds that neither of them ever had any previous criminal convictions, that their names and addresses were known, that they had considerable ties with their community, and that the charges were based on the testimony of witnesses that the defendants objected to. Specifically, the defendants' counsel took issue with the testimony of four eyewitnesses who had testified for the public prosecutor, and appeared to refute almost all the claims made by the defendants and their counsel.

On 17 December, Dimitris Tsovolas, counsel for Grigoropoulos' family, publicly requested that the defendants and defendants' counsel stop provoking the Greek people and the victim's family by making degrading comments, unsubstantiated accusations, and smearing the memory of Alexandros. The ballistics report was also released on 17 December and stated that the bullet that killed Grigoropoulos had in fact ricocheted. However, forensic reports conducted on 21 December concluded that the bullet was not fired in the air, but rather towards the group of teenagers, though there may have been no intention to kill the boy.

== Court decision ==
On 11 October 2010, the Mixed Jury Court of Amfissa (consisting of 3 judges and 4 jurors) found the two special guards guilty. Epaminondas Korkoneas was found guilty of "homicide with direct intention to cause harm" and Vasilis Saraliotis was found guilty as an accomplice. Korkoneas was sentenced to lifetime and an additional 15 months of imprisonment (votes 4–3) while Saraliotis was sentenced to ten years of imprisonment (votes 6–1). In July 2019, the life sentence against Korkoneas was overturned on appeal and reduced to 13 years imprisonment, and Korkoneas was subsequently released from prison.

== The riots and political crisis ==
=== First 2 days ===
Within the hour following the shooting of Grigoropoulοs, angry demonstrators took to the streets in and around Exarcheia, and violent confrontations with the police erupted. Meanwhile, similar demonstrations were reported in other Greek cities as well, including Thessaloniki, Ioannina, Komotini, Kastoria, Patras, Tripoli, Volos, Chios, Trikala, Mytilene, Agrinio, Kavala, Corfu, Piraeus, Chania, Heraklion, Rhodes, Karditsa, Lamia, Stylida, Drama, Xanthi, Lagkadas, Kozani, Alexandroupoli, Larisa and Corinth. After midnight, the demonstrations in Athens turned into violent rioting in some central streets of the city. By dawn on Sunday, 24 police officers had been injured, one seriously (with facial burns and his little finger mutilated) and 31 shops (particularly across Ermou Street), 9 banks, and 25 cars had been either seriously damaged, burned, or destroyed within the downtown area.

Location of the incidents in Athens.

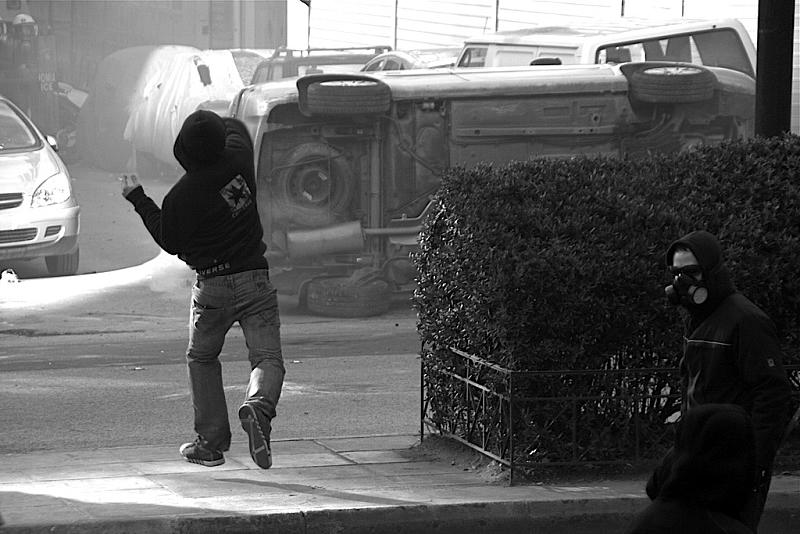
Two rioters in the streets of Athens

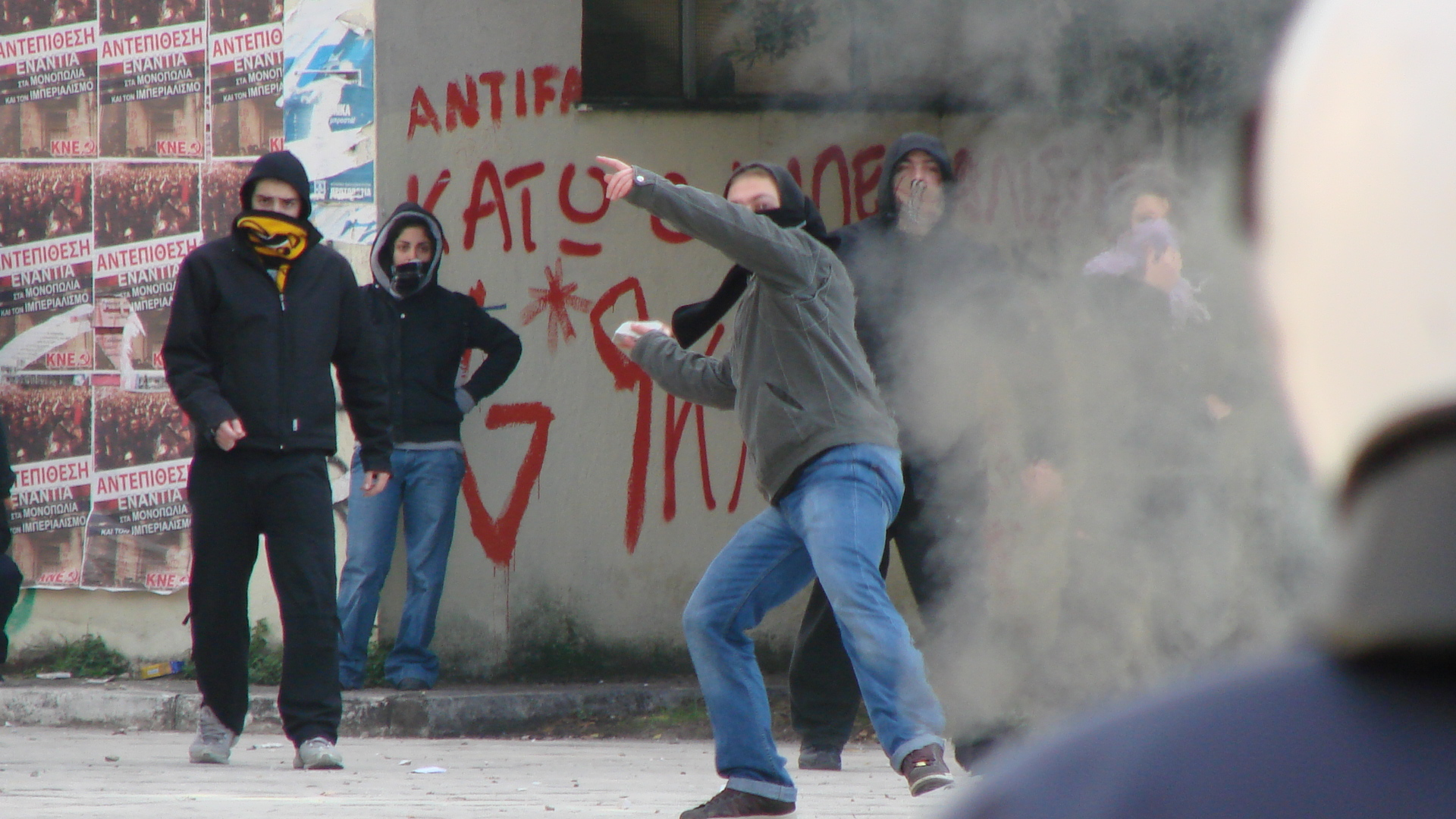
Rioters in Komotini

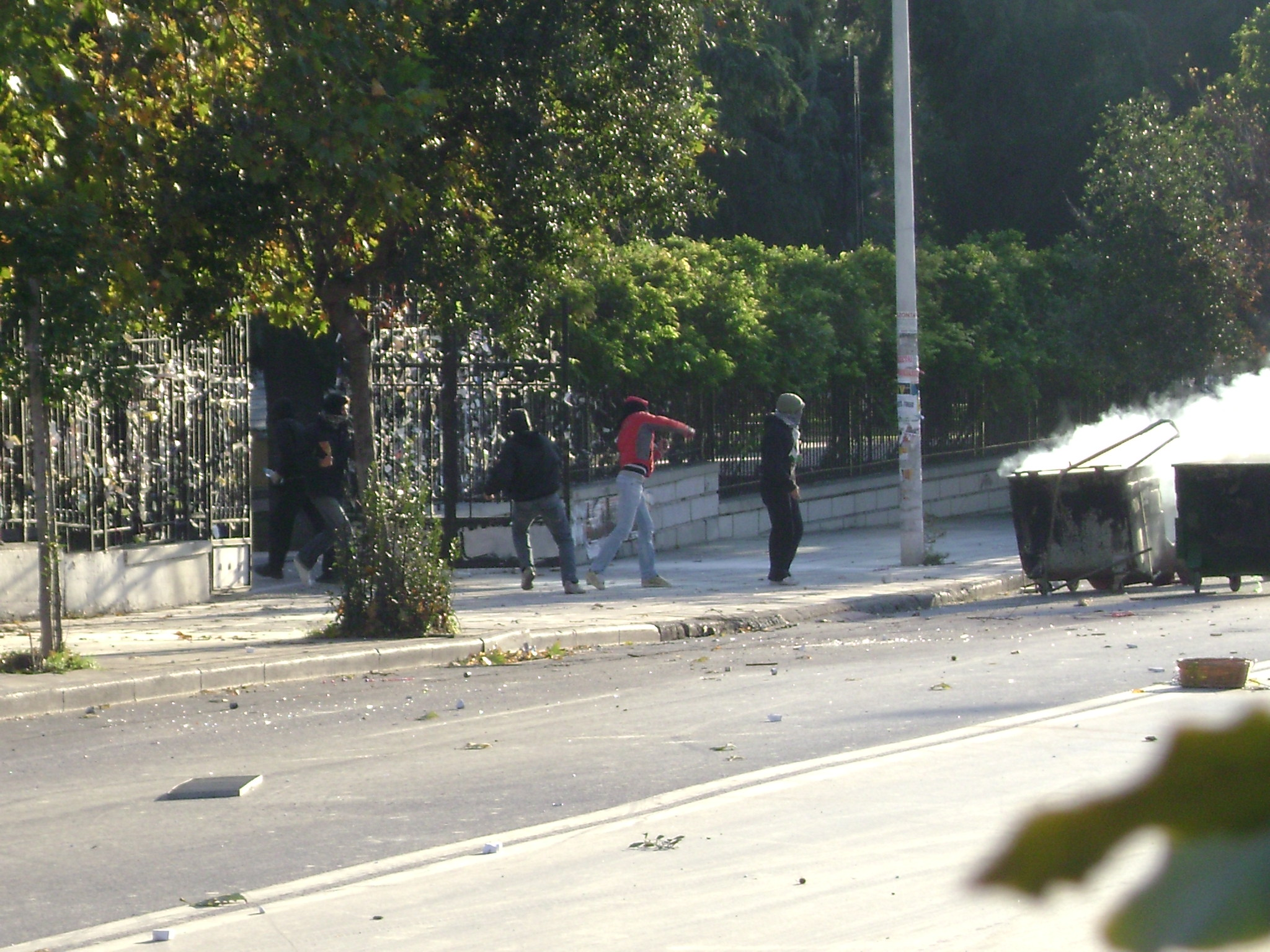
Rioters throwing rocks at Aristotle University of Thessaloniki and smoke from burning trash bins.

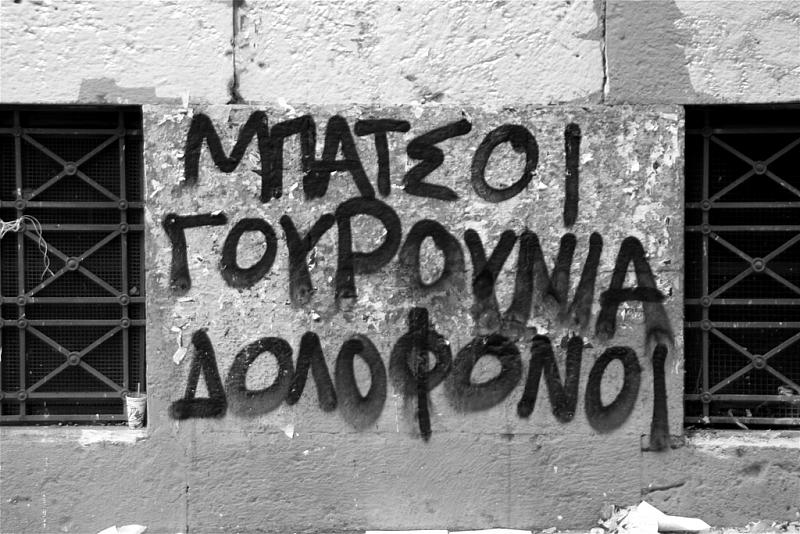
Graffiti at Panepistimiou Street (translation: "cops, pigs, murderers")

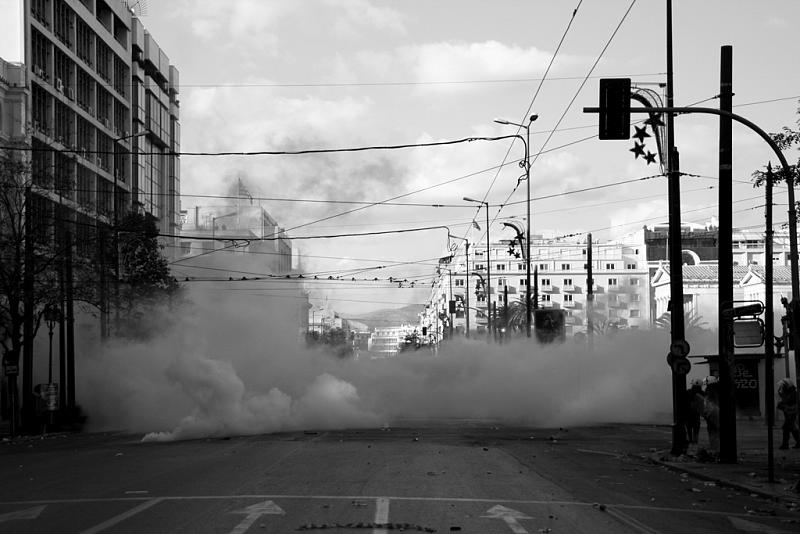
Smoke billows through a street

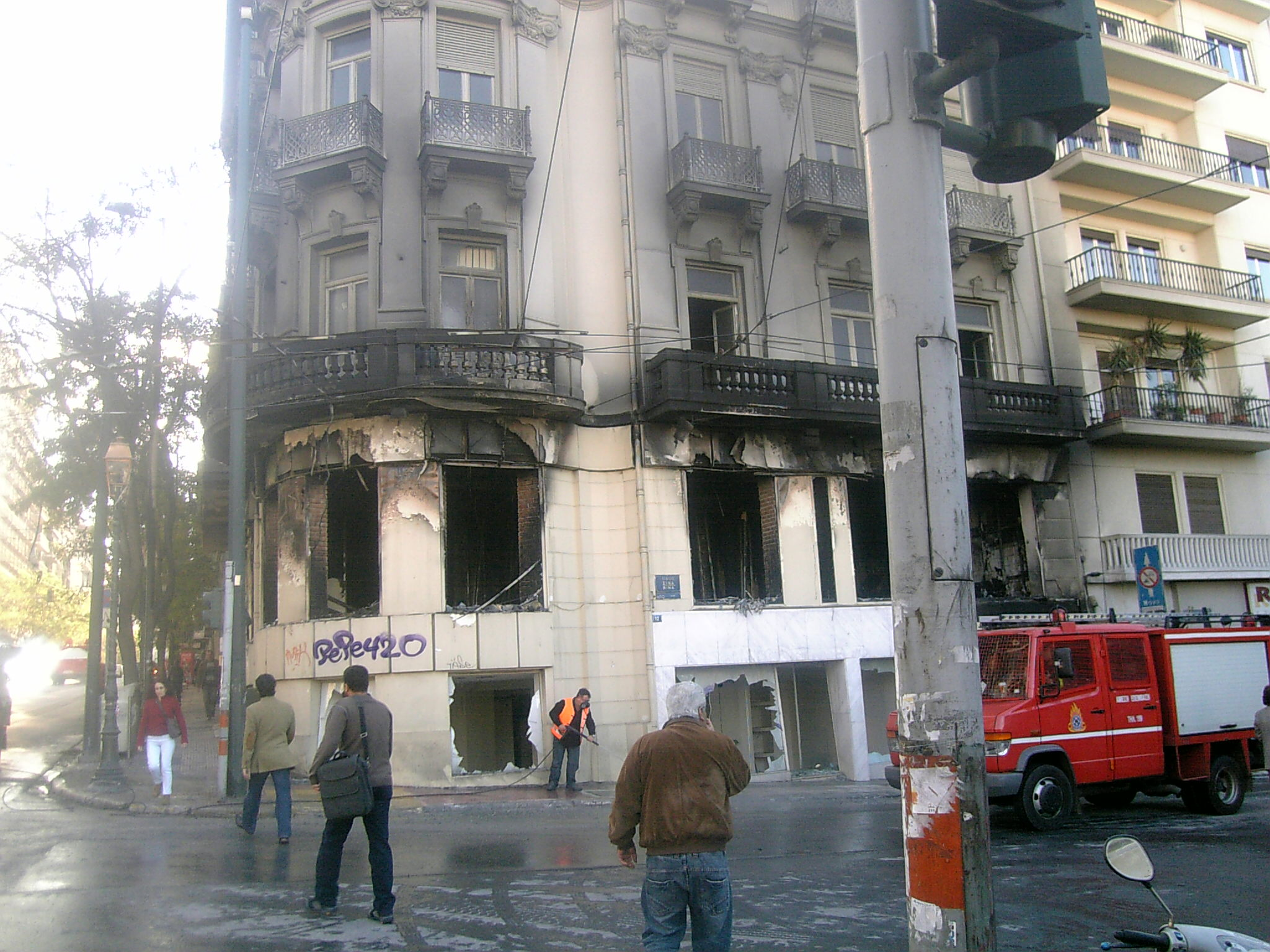
Destroyed European Law Library, Sina and Akadimias Streets

=== First week ===
By Sunday 7 December 2008 38 vehicles were damaged, 13 police officers were injured, and 22 rioters were arrested.

Monday 8 December 2008 saw police assess damage as daily schedules resumed and rioting subsided. However, all was not quiet, as all over Greece, several thousands of high school students walked out of their schools and marched on local police stations, throwing eggs, paint bombs, and water bottles. Protesters continued to occupy university campuses around the nation, while organizations such as the Communist Party of Greece announced plans for protests later that day. The massive demonstrations of that evening were confronted by police using tear gas; during the demonstrations, some 11 public buildings around the central plaza of Athens, Syntagma Square, were set on fire.

Students around Greece proceeded to occupy their school buildings, in protest, including in Serres, Imathia, Chalkidiki, Pieria, and Thessaloniki. The Aristotle University of Thessaloniki, the National Technical University of Athens, as well as the Athens University of Economics and Business remained under student occupation. Rioters also set fire to the Kostis Palamas building that led to the total destruction of the European Law Library situated at the corner of Akadimias and Sina street. After the fire, the rector of the National and Kapodistrian University of Athens, Christos Kittas, resigned, but some days later withdrew his resignation.

A police report released Tuesday, 9 December 2008 in the morning put the numbers of injured police officers at 12, arrested rioters at 87, and persons who had been brought before a public prosecutor at 176. Some citizens began to act against the rioters, attacking people that were found looting and were seen throwing stones to protect their belongings. In the city of Patras, according to the city's mayor, members of far-left organizations took part in the violence. In Athens, seven police officers were injured, four rioters were arrested for violence against the police, 12 were arrested for theft and 55 were arrested for rioting with another 25 people of non-Greek nationality arrested for the same reason. In a report on Tuesday, Amnesty International accused the Greek Police of brutality in handling the riots. The Greek department of Amnesty International canceled the scheduled celebrations on 10 December for the 60th anniversary of the adoption of the Universal Declaration of Human Rights in response to the police violence in Greece.

The crisis deepened on Wednesday 10 December 2008 when the General Confederation of Greek Workers (ΓΣΕΕ) and the Civil Servants' Confederation (ΑΔΕΔΥ), representing 2.5 million workers or roughly half of the total Greek workforce, called a one-day general strike in protest against the government's economic policies. Rioting continued in Athens as thousands of workers gathered for anti-government protests at Syntagma Square.

On Thursday, 11 December 2008 4,000 students marched against the police, with many protesters throwing firebombs at the officers.

On Friday, 12 December 2008 students attacked police outside the parliament building. Riot police fired tear gas in response. Heavy rain helped curtail demonstrations compared to previous days. The protests inspired small protests in some European cities, sowing fears of copycat riots elsewhere. On the same day, Greek police issued an appeal for more tear gas after supplies ran low, since more than 4,600 capsules of it were released against the protestors by that time.

On Saturday, 13 December 2008 large groups of demonstrators gathered in front of the Greek Parliament in central Athens. Despite the fact that the protest in front of the Greek parliament was relatively peaceful, the riot police attempted to dissolve it at 1:30 (local time) by using tear gas and violence. On the same day, about 100 protesters firebombed a police station near the Exarcheia district where Alexandros Grigoropoulos was killed.

On Sunday, 14 December 2008 students joined residents of the Exarcheia district to demand the renaming of that street in honour of the dead teenager. Also, at least four radio stations based in Athens were occupied by protesters. In Thessaloniki, students demonstrated in solidarity with all the people who were arrested as a result of rioting over the past week.

=== Second week ===
On Monday, 15 December 2008 students gathered outside the Attica General Police Directorate in central Athens. The riot police chose to dissolve the protest through violence after some of the demonstrators threw eggs against one riot police squad. Many of the demonstrators were of school-age. Several newspapers report that the protesters were provoked by policemen. In Piraeus, approximately 300 students rallied outside the local Korydallos Prison and taunted the police who fired tear gas to disperse them. According to teachers' unions, some 600 schools were under occupation, while 150 university facilities across the country had been taken over according to the Greek Ministry of Education. In Ioannina, the local public radio station was occupied by students and far-leftist groups. Rallies and demonstrations have also taken place in Chania, Heraklion, Larissa and Thessaloniki.

On Tuesday, 16 December 2008 rallies and protests took place outside many police stations in Athens and Piraeus. Early in the afternoon, masked youths emerged from the university complex in Zografou and firebombed nearby Athens' riot police headquarters. Six police officers were injured and ten vehicles were burnt. Meanwhile, a group of around 30 protesters infiltrated the studios of public broadcaster ERT and interrupted a news broadcast featuring Prime Minister Kostas Karamanlis. For about a minute, the protesters stood in front of the camera holding banners reading "Stop watching, get out into the streets." ERT Chairman Christos Panagopoulos tendered his resignation over the incident but it was rejected by the government. "It is unacceptable for unidentified individuals to deprive others of their right to information," he said.

On Wednesday, 17 December 2008 a rally was held outside the capital's main courthouses, where youths threw eggs and fruit at the police. There was also one demonstration organised by the All-Workers Militant Front (ΠΑΜΕ) in central Athens from Omonoia Square to the Greek Parliament, drawing around 5000 people. Student protesters evaded security guards at the Acropolis of Athens and unfurled two giant pink banners over a wall near the Parthenon to rally support for continued demonstrations. "Thursday 18/12 demonstrations in all Europe," one banner read, while the other simply bore the message, "Resistance," in Greek, English, Spanish and German. "We chose this monument to democracy, this global monument, to proclaim our resistance to state violence and demand rights in education and work," "(We did it) to send a message globally and to all Europe." said the protestors. Government spokesman, Evangelos Antonaros, said this protest was "inexcusable" and accused the protesters of tarnishing Greece's image abroad. In Kaisariani, near the riot police headquarters that were targeted by youths on Tuesday, a group of Protesters torched a police bus. The only person in the bus, the driver, managed to escape unhurt. In another protest, about 40 people – including workers, immigrants and unemployed citizens – occupied the offices of the country's main labor union, the General Confederation of Greek Workers (ΓΣΕΕ). The union's president, Giannis Panagopoulos, said the protest was mistargeted: "The GSEE does not govern this country". A protest was also held outside the Prefecture of Thessaloniki offices and the Ministry for Macedonia–Thrace which is also based in Thessaloniki. Late that night, a homemade explosive device planted outside a branch of Eurobank in the Thessaloniki district of Kalamaria damaged the building's facade when it detonated. A similar device smashed the windows of a local Citizens' Information and Service Center (ΚΕΠ). In Ioannina, the town hall was occupied, while in Chania, a local television station remained under occupation by protesters for about 1 hour.

On Thursday, 18 December 2008 demonstrations took place in central Athens, more than 12,000 protesters crowded the streets near the Greek parliament in a peaceful demonstration in central Athens which turned violent when a group of protesters broke away from the rally and threw rocks and firebombs at police and buildings near Parliament, overturned a car and set fire to trash cans, splashed the police with red paint and tried to burn down the city's main Christmas tree which had just been replaced after being torched during the previous week's riots. The police responded with tear gas and flash grenades, and drove the rioters back toward the administrative headquarters of National and Kapodistrian University of Athens and the university's School of Law, Economics and Political Sciences. After another round of pitched battles between masked rioters and the police, several hundred protesters entered the School of Law, Economics and Political Sciences. Christmas shoppers fled the streets and retailers rolled down their shutters as protesters smashed store fronts and burned at least four cars. Demonstrations also took place in Thessaloniki where protesters gathered outside the Ministry for Macedonia–Thrace. Rallies and protests also took place in Patras, Tripoli, Chania and Trikala. Some labour unions stopped work in solidarity with the demonstrators. The work stoppage by the air traffic controllers forced Olympic Airlines to cancel 28 flights and postpone 14. Hospitals were also operating with very limited staff.

On Friday, 19 December 2008 a protest took place outside the Greek parliament, and a solidarity concert outside the administrative building of the National and Kapodistrian University of Athens. More than 1500 people demonstrated peacefully in the western suburb of Athens, Peristeri following another shooting of a 16-year-old on Wednesday, 17 December, night. The teenager was struck in the hand by a bullet fired by an unidentified assailant while sitting in a park, outside a local high school with friends. The police admitted that they had made a mistake in their initial statement that the boy was hit by an air-gun pellet. Tests revealed it was either a .38 Special or .357 Magnum bullet. Officers are investigating the incident, anxious to disprove rumors that an off-duty or undercover policeman fired the shot. A police spokesman said that no officers were in the area at the time of the shooting and an investigation was under way. Masked youths attacked the French Institute in Athens with firebombs, "Spark in Athens. Fire in Paris. Insurrection is coming," read one graffiti spray-painted onto the building's walls in French. Another, written in Greek, read "France, Greece, uprising everywhere". Later on Friday, about 50 protesters interrupted the official premiere of the Greek National Theater, holding up banners urging people to join the demonstrations.

On Saturday, 20 December 2008 about 150 youth attacked the Christmas tree at Syntagma Square in central Athens, at around 16.00, hanging trash bags from its branches before clashing with riot police. The square was cleared within two hours. At least three news photographers were injured by police batons. The Christmas tree protest was organized among of a worldwide day of events to commemorate Grigoropoulos' shooting. The same day, masked men firebombed the offices of Tiresias SA, a debtor recordkeeper, destroying the office. Rioters, using the National Technical University of Athens as a base, launched attacks against police, throwing rocks and petrol bombs and erecting roadblocks. In Thessaloniki a group of Protesters briefly occupied a radio station and a theater before disrupting and threw cakes and candy at Mayor Vassilis Papageorgopoulos and one of his deputies during an open-air charity event near the theater. Later, a group emerged from the same theater and attacked a Nativity scene, throwing away Christ's figure.

On Sunday, 21 December 2008 in the early hours of the morning, unidentified hood-wearing assailants threw petrol bombs at the police academy in the west Athens district of Nea Philadelphia six police vehicles were torched, without causing any casualties. The vehicles that were parked outside the building of the police accounting department at Patriarchou Constantinou street, also suffered damage in the attack. At around the same time, rioting and clashes with riot police continued in the area around the National Technical University of Athens and the University of Thessaloniki, with protesters again lobbing petrol bombs at police.

=== Third week ===
On Tuesday, 23 December 2008 more than 3,000 chanting protesters marched through Athens. During the demonstration, one police car was damaged. At 05:50 local time, shots were fired at a riot police bus in Athens near the riot police headquarters in Zografou. None of the 19 officers on board were injured, authorities said, but the attack raised concern that violence against police could escalate. The shots were fired from the grounds of the National Technical University of Athens's facilities in Zografou, known as Polytechnioupolis. One bullet blew out two tires on the bus, while another struck the engine. The police found 7.62 mm caliber bullet casings at the scene of the shooting. After ballistic examinations, it was announced that there were at least two shooters who used Kalashnikov type rifles and that the particular weapons used in the attack had not been used in any other attack, robbery, or other criminal incident in Greece.

On Wednesday, 24 December 2008, hundreds of Protesters marched through Athens streets in a peaceful protest.

On Thursday, 25 December 2008, in central Athens and the suburb of Palaio Faliron there was a string of arson attacks against banks and car dealerships, causing widespread damage but no injuries. There was also an attack against the offices of the Ministry for Development in the city center. Arsonists also targeted the car of Deputy Environment and Public Works Minister, Stavros Kaloyiannis, outside his home in the northwestern town of Ioannina, destroying the vehicle. The assailants doused the wheels of the parked car with flammable liquid before setting it alight, according to the fire service.

=== Aftermath ===
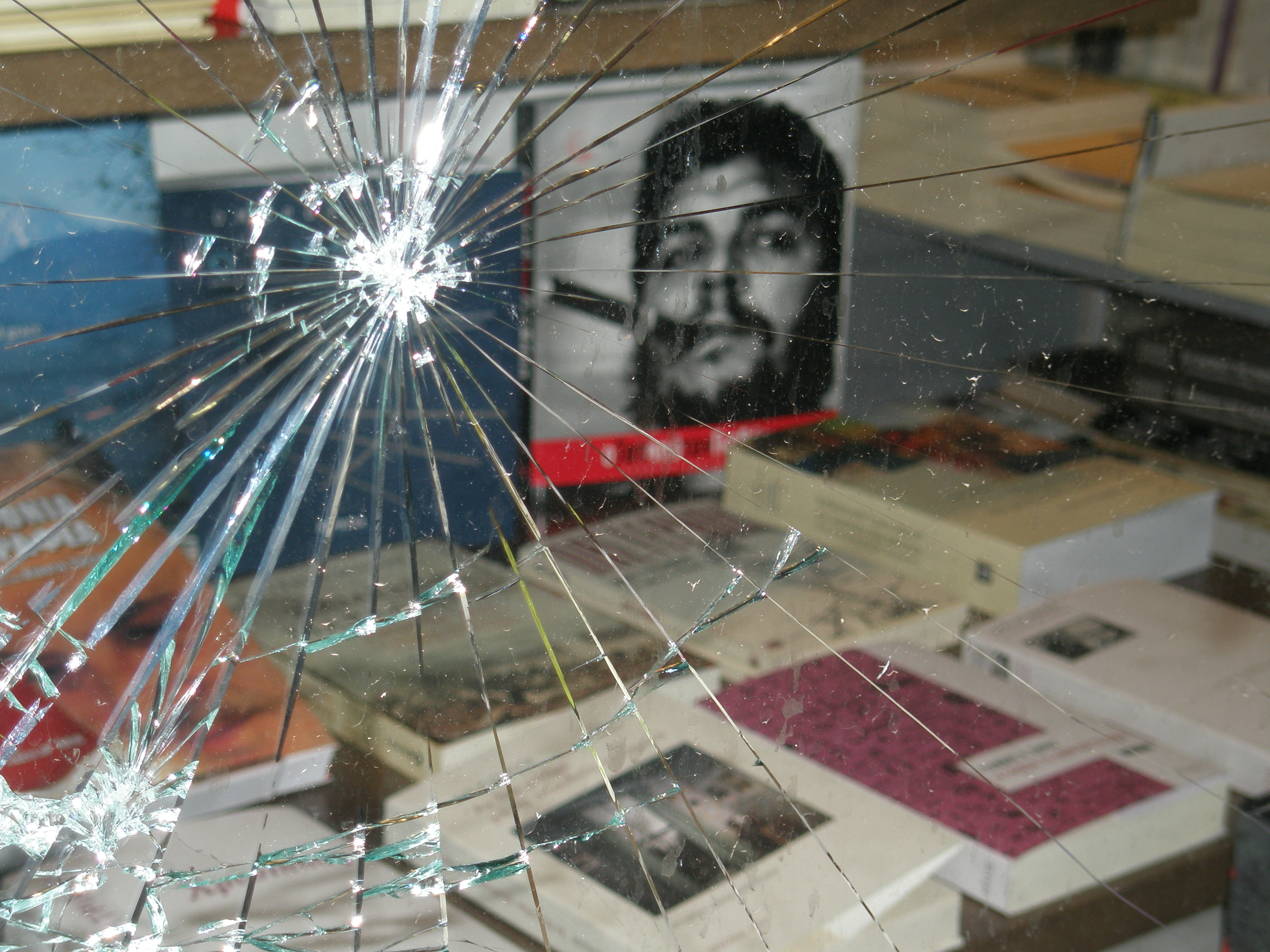
Bookstore in Athens after riots

By Wednesday 31 December 2008 the occupation of Greek universities in Athens and Thessaloniki had ended and the administrative officials had begun assessing the cost of damage done during the occupation.

On Thursday, 1 January 2009 arsonists attacked 10 banks and two car dealerships around Athens and Piraeus amidst the New Year celebrations. No injuries or arrests were reported by the police. The attacks caused minor damage. At least five arson attacks were also reported by police in Thessaloniki; earlier that day police also briefly clashed with protesters, and fired tear gas at rock throwing demonstrators.

In the early morning of Monday, 5 January 2009 at least two masked gunmen fired over 20 rounds at a riot police unit guarding the Greek Ministry of Culture in central Athens, hitting a 21-year-old officer in the chest and groin. The officer had apparently spotted the gunmen and warned his colleagues shortly before he was hit. An automatic Kalashnikov rifle and an MP5 submachine gun were used in the attack, also a fragmentation grenade was used as a diversion as the perpetrators escaped. The wounded policeman, identified as Diamandis Matzounis, was in a critical, but stable, condition in hospital after six hours of surgery. Authorities said they had cordoned off the region around the site of the attack to collect evidence for forensic examination. At least 72 people were detained during the initial search for suspects. Police said ballistics tests showed the MP5 matched one used in a 30 April 2007, attack on a police station in Athens suburb Nea Ionia. That attack caused no injuries but was claimed by the far-left Revolutionary Struggle group. Police also said ballistics tests showed that a second weapon used on Monday, a Kalashnikov rifle, was used in the more recent attack on police, on 23 December 2008. On Wednesday 14 January 2009 Revolutionary Struggle sent a statement to the weekly satirical newspaper, To Pontiki. The statement said the group carried out 23 December shooting attack and the separate 5 January shooting at the police officers. By Monday, 19 January 2009 Diamantis Matzounis The 21-year-old police officer seriously injured in the attack of 5 January 2009 was removed from intensive care following an improvement in his condition. Doctors said Diamantis Mantzounis had to undergo two operations to staunch a stomach hemorrhage caused by a bullet wound, but he has managed to recuperate.

On Friday, 9 January 2009 a long-planned education protest march took place in Athens. The rally was organized to coincide with the anniversary of the 1991 murder of high school teacher Nikos Temponeras by the secretary of the Patras youth organization of the, back then, ruling New Democracy (Greece) party, participants said they protest against police repression, corrupt politicians, the education reform and a social system that offers little hope, it was one of two held in the capital but it was the only one that turned violent. The trouble began after the rally by several thousand schoolchildren, teachers and students had almost reached its end, near the entrance to University of Athens where it had started. When hooded youths broke away from the student march and threw stones and flares at riot police, who fired tear gas and flash grenades. The youths then turned on police, hurling rocks and flares. At one point a group of protesters tried to force their way into the rector's office and to occupy the central offices of the University of Athens. The occupation of the university's offices was obstructed by groups of students and academics. According to rector Christos Kittas, police officers did not ask for university immunity to be lifted so that they could gain access to the faculty. Clashes continued in the area which was closed to traffic and where hundreds of demonstrators remained for an hour. There were repeated police charges and several arrests were made. Some 60 persons were arrested with several demonstrators severely injured in clashes with police. Between those arrested were fourteen lawyers, who said that they had nothing to do with the protest, also several people sustained minor injuries and one was hospitalized. Afterwards the influential Journalists' Union of the Athens Daily Newspapers (ESIEA) protested to the Ministry for the Interior and Public Order about "the brutal attacks and beatings" to which reporters and camera crews had been subjected by some riot police units. "There may have been excesses to be condemned, we are looking into the issue, but the police did their job," Minister for the Interior and Public Order Prokopis Pavlopoulos told Greek television. Later that evening, hundreds of demonstrators gathered outside the capital's central police headquarters on Alexandras Avenue, leading to some tense scuffles with officers. But the crowd had dispersed by late night, according to police who did not report any additional problems.

Protests were carried on Thursday, 15 January, policemen labor unionists also took part in the demonstrations "to condemn the violent phenomena, from wherever they come, and to state categorically that social problems are not solved by repressive measures". Veteran politician Manolis Glezos who took part in the protest, attributed police violence to the obedience of police forces to the executive power and not the judiciary.

On Friday, 16 January some of the lawyers arrested on Friday's demonstration in Athens, filed suits against police officers accusing them for breach of duty, attempted bodily harm and unnecessarily exposing of people to tear gas.

On Saturday, 17 January, a demonstration was held in Larissa, where more than three thousand people protested against the anti-terrorism act and called for the charges to be dropped and for the release of four jailed students who had been arrested during the demonstrations of December 2008. Larissa was the only city where the act had been applied the previous month, when twenty-five teenagers were arrested. At the same time protesters of a separate rally also in Larissa destroyed bank cameras and wrote slogans on walls, churches and supermarkets.

The death of Alexandros and the subsequent events galvanized many in Athens including Protester bank robber and hunger-striker Nikos Romanos who was with Alexis on the night of the murder, reporting that he had died in his arms.

=== Background and causes ===
Grigoropoulos's killing happened during a period where the Greek society faced a variety of difficulties in the midst of a worldwide economic slump. In a survey conducted shortly after the events for the Greek newspaper Kathimerini, 60% of the respondents considered them to be part of a wider "social uprising". Many people were concerned with corruption scandals, most of which involved mishandling of public money, the spread of poverty, the increasing rate of unemployment amongst young graduates and the slowing economy during Great Recession. The local student community—which formed the main body of protesters—had also been in significant turmoil since 2006, being opposed to a series of proposed laws regarding the reform of the country's education system. Many of the student demonstrations in relation to these laws in early 2007 turned violent and resulted in clashes with the police, though the perpetrators of the incidents of violence and vandalism, then as in December 2008, should not be necessarily identified with the students.

As in many other countries, young Greeks are faced with expensive studies.

International Monetary Fund Managing Director, Dominique Strauss-Kahn warned that there was a risk of social unrest spreading unless the financial sector shared wealth more evenly. Greece had recently proposed to go through with €28 bn of cash injections to its banking system while at the same time leaving medicine suppliers unpaid.

Greece also suffers from one of the highest levels of public debt in the EU, with foreign debt valued at 93.9% of projected 2008 GDP and 16% of revenue in 2009 projected to go towards servicing this debt.

=== First commemoration of the shooting incident ===
On Saturday, 5 December 2009 a large crowd gathered at the place where Grigoropoulos was shot, ahead of Sunday's scheduled demonstration, with no reported clashes. However, Police had detained 160 people following minor clashes in central Athens. Police, also, made a preemptive raid on an Protesters hangout in Keratsini near Piraeus on Saturday night detaining 22 people, including Albanian, Italian and Spanish citizens. They discovered some 200 empty bottles they believe were going to be used to make Molotov cocktails, two jerry cans of fuel, two hammers, three sledgehammers, three helmets, 13 gas masks and a stun grenade. They also seized a computer. Two of the people arrested were the son and daughter of Panhellenic Socialist Movement MP and deputy parliamentary speaker Grigoris Niotis. "I have total faith in Greek justice, just as I trust my children," said Niotis.

On Sunday, 6 December 2009 at 11:30 pm a memorial gathering, at the cemetery where 15-year-old Alexandros Grigoropoulos is buried, took place in the presence of his family and was attended by hundreds of people including the Greek Minister of Education. Later that day, several thousand demonstrators marched in central Athens and other cities across Greece and Europe to commemorate the death of 15-year-old Alexandros Grigoropoulos at about. However the protest in Athens was followed by scenes reminiscent of those that followed Grigoropoulos's death, as several hundred protesters remained holed up in the grounds of the University of Athens and the city's Law School and used the two institutions as their bases, they clashed from roughly 6 pm and for about three hours with thousands of police who had been deployed in the city center to ensure that the anniversary of the killing of Alexis Grigoropoulos passed as peacefully as possible. Authorities said 134 people were detained for public order offenses in Athens and 80 in the northern city of Thessaloniki, where a similar demonstration also ended in violence, with youths throwing petrol bombs at police and setting fire to cars. At least five protesters and 16 police officers were injured during the clashes. Including one female demonstrator, who was severely injured by a policeman when he struck her with his motorbike. The rector of the University of Athens, Christos Kittas, was hospitalized after protesters stormed into his office. Kittas was struck on the head and was taken to the Ippocrateio Hospital, where doctors placed him in intensive care, saying that he had suffered a heart ischemia. According to the witness of two contributors of the magazine, Occupied London, the director leaving the area had no blood on his head, and the story of his heart attack was fabricated as a "pretext for a full-on attack on the academic asylum".

The series of protests and riots continued months later with the May 2010 Greek protests.

== Reactions ==
=== Domestic response ===
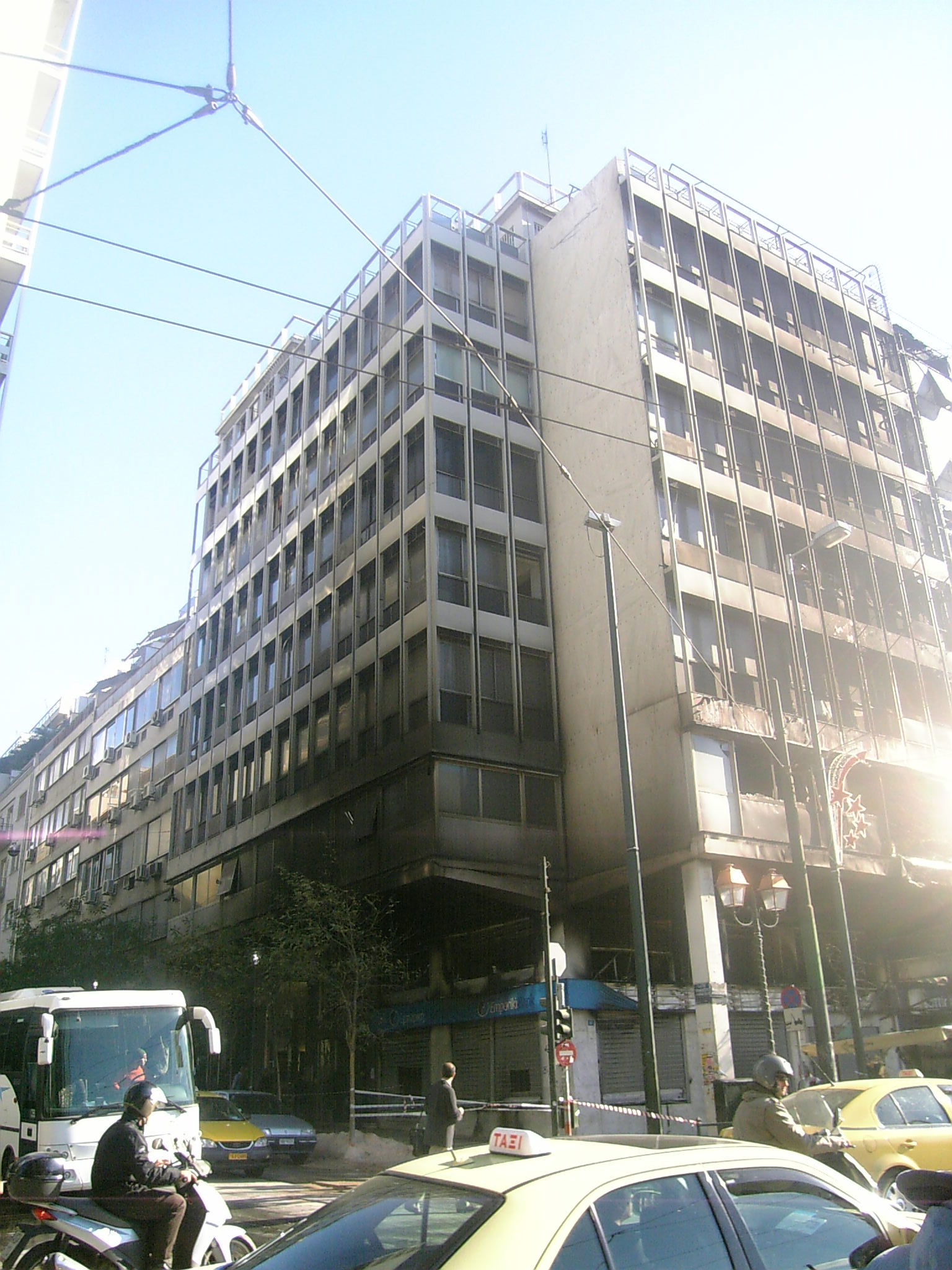
Many buildings were set on fire during the riots

The Greek government condemned the shooting. Prime Minister Kostas Karamanlis wrote a letter to the student's family, stating that "In these difficult moments please accept my condolences for the unfair loss of your son. Like all Greeks I am deeply saddened. I know that nothing can relieve your pain." He continued on to write that "the state will see to it that such a tragedy does not happen again." On a nationally broadcast statement, he also vowed to end the "dangerous" extremist-inspired riots that have hit the country:

The unacceptable and dangerous events cannot and will not be tolerated, the extremist elements who exploited the tragedy ... by showing that their only goal was to spread violence. The state will protect its citizens and society ... It is the least of the tributes we owe Alexandros.

On 8 December he declared that he had ordered the finance ministry to offer "quick and full compensation" to Greek people whose buildings have been damaged in the riots.

President Karolos Papoulias sent condolences in a telegram, while Interior minister Prokopis Pavlopoulos expressed "deep sorrow". The police, who claimed that an investigation was underway into the "isolated" incident, also apologized.

The Communist Party of Greece (KKE) attributed the killing of 15-year-old Alexandros Grigoropoulos to the result of escalating authoritarianism, reinforcement of the suppression mechanisms and their action, the network of reactionary laws and the "Euro-terror laws" created by the governments of ND and PASOK. The KKE has stated that the riots and the destruction is the work of foreign agents acting as provocateurs. The leader of the KKE, Aleka Papariga, called for organized struggle against the main politics that it will be well guarded against suspicious command centers. The Panhellenic Socialist Movement stated that people "must answer the government's policies en masse and peacefully".

From Moscow, where he attended Patriarch Alexy II's funeral, Archbishop Ieronymos II of Athens called on everyone to face the crisis and the problems ahead with co-operation and not with destruction. Also in an interview on 13 December, the Archbishop added that the "youths are not enraged for no reason" and stated his belief that the effects of the Great Recession coupled with the large unemployment rate are the causes of this violent outburst.

On 10 December, Prime Minister Karamanlis announced 7 governmental measures to aid the large number of Greek businesses that were damaged by the rioters, also aiding businesses that are undamaged. The Prime Minister stated that the commercial world of the country faced the destructive mania and the raw violence of extremist groups. "The government", he said, "will ensure the sentiment of public safety and support all damaged businesses.

The General Federation of Professional Tradesmen and Traders of Greece saluted the measures and agreed with the direction that the measures were headed in.

On 12 December, Vice-Minister of the Interior Panagiotis Chinofotis, as a political leader of the Greek Police, said that he felt that he had to ask for forgiveness for the shooting incident and the resulting death of Alexandros Grigoropoulos, since neither the defendant nor the defendant's lawyer did so.

On 16 December, Prime Minister Kostas Karamanlis speaking to New Democracy (Greece)'s parliamentary group, condemned the killing of the 15-year-old by the policeman, while calling for all parties to isolate rioters. He also acknowledged that "Long-unresolved problems, such as the lack of meritocracy, corruption in everyday life and a sense of social injustice disappoint young people". Karamanlis said income-tax cuts will go ahead. But he warned against high expectations, saying Greece will spend €12 billion, about 5% of GDP, just to service its national debt. "Our top priority is to support those hurt the most ... (but) this debt is a huge burden that reduces the government's flexibility at this critical time".

=== International response and demonstrations abroad ===
- Argentina: In Argentina 50 students show their protests. On 13 December a small group of students gathered outside the Greek embassy in Buenos Aires to express their solidarity and to condemn the shooting of Alexandros Grigoropoulos.
- Australia: Australia warned tourists of possible violent demonstrations.
- Austria: Approximately 1200 demonstrators protested outside the Greek embassy in Vienna.
- Bosnia and Herzegovina: Demonstrations took place in front of Greek embassy in Sarajevo by students of University of Sarajevo.
- Bulgaria: Protests took place in front of the Greek embassy in Sofia.
- Canada: In Vancouver, Protesters broke the windows and tagged a bank in solidarity with the rioters. In Montreal, a rally in solidarity with the rioters is held in front of the Greek consulate on 16 December.
- China: China expressed concern about the safety of its nationals living in Greece.
- Cyprus: Riots, demonstrations and clashes also spread to Cyprus. The riots began around midday on 8 December 2008 in the capital Nicosia and the western city of Paphos. In Paphos, student protesters gathered around the city's town hall and the police headquarters where they began verbally abusing the Cypriot police. The protesters also starting throwing rocks at the building, injuring at least one police officer. These violent clashes were met with the arrest of two students. In the city of Larnaca, hundreds of students gathered at the police headquarters where they engaged in demonstrations and "scuffles" in response to the events in Athens. On 10 December, Cyprus Airways cancelled a number of flights to both mainland Greece and islands, including to Athens, Thessaloniki and Heraklion, due to the outbreak of strikes by air traffic controllers and other airport workers.
- Denmark: 63 people were arrested in Copenhagen when their protests in support of the Greek rioters allegedly turned violent.
- France: Protesters entered the Greek consulate in Paris, France. The symbolic occupation was peaceful. 3000 demonstrators also gathered outside the Greek embassy in Paris and scuffled with police before partly blocking the Champs-Élysées, the most prestigious avenue in Paris. In Bordeaux, a city in the south of the country, demonstrators set cars alight outside the Greek consulate and wrote graffiti about a coming 'insurrection'.
- Germany: On the night of 7 December 2008 and during the following week, spontaneous demonstrations of solidarity took place in numerous German cities, both by left-wing groups of Greek university students studying abroad and local leftist activists. In the first week after the incident, the German Indymedia network had reported demonstrations in 26 German cities, with participation ranging from a few dozen to several hundred people, among the biggest being Berlin, Hamburg, Cologne, Hanover, Bremen, Leipzig, Dresden, and Nuremberg. On 8 December 2008, a group of demonstrators occupied the Greek consulate in Berlin: 240 people pushed their way into the lobby of the consulate at Wittenbergplatz in western Berlin at around 9:40 am local time. One of the demonstrators told the Deutsche Presse-Agentur that the demonstration was in protest against a Greek state that was responsible for the death of the teenager. The occupation ultimately ended peacefully. On 20 December German riot police confronted an estimated 950 protesters in Hamburg who were expressing their sympathy for student protesters in Greece by marching under the banner of "Solidarity is a weapon." The German police reported that the protest actions were broken up after they escalated to rioting.
- (Republic of Ireland) Ireland: Over two dozen people in the capital city, Dublin, picketed the Greek embassy in protest at the shooting and in solidarity with the protests. A second solidarity event was held after the call-out for international solidarity from those partaking in the events in Greece. Activists from the Workers Solidarity Movement, along with members of the Greek community in Ireland and individual activists, marched to the Greek embassy from St Stephen's Green with banners proclaiming 'RESIST THE POLICE: MURDERERS IN UNIFORM' 'OUR LIVES DO NOT BELONG TO THE STATE' and 'REMEMBER THE DEAD – FIGHT LIKE HELL FOR THE LIVING' The activists marched down a main-road behind these banners, at the height of the Christmas shopping period. The embassy had been attacked at some stage before the demonstration, and its front walls were covered in red paint. Two windows were also broken in the attack. When the rally arrived it was addressed by a Greek Protesters living in Ireland.
- Italy: Related graffiti were found in Turin near the Greek consulate. Many activists demonstrated in front of the Greek consulate in Bologna. (Again one year later on 11 December 2009 during a students demonstration red paint was thrown against military police in front of the Greek consulate in Bologna) Demonstrations took place also in Florence and in front of the Hellenic Institute for Byzantine Studies in Venice. In Rome, demonstrators burned a garbage bin and threw fire crackers and rocks at police cars trying to stop them from reaching the Greek embassy.
- Luxembourg: Around thirty protesters marched through Luxembourg's city centre on Saturday 20 December 2008 afternoon to show solidarity with young people in Greece. The group assembled at 15:30 in the Place Guillaume and followed a route through the city centre to the Greek Embassy. Although the group disrupted traffic at times, the police reported no disturbances. the group dispersed around 6 pm.
- Portugal: Some demonstrations were held in the city of Lisbon and Amadora, on 20 December, the international day of solidarity with Greece.
- North Macedonia: Around 20 activists gathered in front of the Greek embassy in a peaceful protest in support of the Greek demonstrators. Protests were taken in front of the Greek Embassy in Skopje on 14 December and at the main square of Skopje on 18 December.
- Romania: Around 20 people protested in front of the Greek Consulate in Bucharest. Three were detained. The protest included a die-in.
- Russia: The Greek embassy in Moscow was targeted by firebombers. As a result, the Russian police increased security measures around the embassy. On 13 December about 30 activists of "Left Front" participated in a demonstration of solidarity. Approximately 15 people were arrested.
- Serbia: In Serbia, there was an attack on the Greek embassy, where several molotovs were thrown through windows and interior and exterior walls were vandalised in support for the Greek protesters. Six protesters were arrested and tried for "vandalism and terrorism". All of them received 6-month sentences, but were later acquitted because of a lack of evidence against them.
- Spain: In Spain, 11 demonstrators were arrested and several policemen injured in clashes in Madrid and Barcelona. Attacks on a police station and a bank by Spanish youths in Madrid and Barcelona also fueled concern about copy-cat protests. In Seville, a relatively small concentration of people in front of a police station was announced for 10 December, in the evening, since the day before, turning into a spontaneous demonstration of over 100 people through the streets. Slogans were chanted denouncing the repressive role of the police and State, labelled as "assassin", "violent", "repressor" and "terrorist", as well as for solidarity with Alexandros Grigoropoulos and Greek riots.
- Sweden: In Stockholm, approximately 50 demonstrators protested the killing of Alexandros Grigoropoulos outside the Greek embassy.
- Switzerland: In Zürich, approximately 120 demonstrators protested the killing of Alexandros Grigoropoulos and police violence and expressed their support to the demonstrators in Greece.
- Netherlands: Solidarity demonstrations took place in The Hague, Amsterdam, Nijmegen and Leiden. Approximately 200 demonstrators took part in each of these largely peaceful demonstrations.
- Turkey: A dozen left-wing demonstrators daubed red paint on the Greek consulate in Istanbul. Also a large demonstration was organised on 11 December by the EMEP. Protesters attacked to the Greek consulate building with red paint and broke into the building.
- United Kingdom: Britain warned tourists of possibly violent demonstrations. On 8 December 2008 in London, up to a hundred protesters clashed with police after trying to storm the Greek embassy in London. A group of Protesters tore down the Greek flag from the building in Holland Park and set it on fire. The police had been called to deal with "about 30" young protesters that seemed to be mostly students. Two protests were held in Edinburgh, on 8 and 10 December, both involving protest marches up to Castle Street.
- United States: On 10 December, the Greek consulate in New York was defaced with black graffiti, and a rock was thrown at one of the windows. On 11 December 50 people in Olympia, the capital of the state of Washington, marched in solidarity with the Greek revolt. Bank windows were smashed, resulting in one arrest. On 17 December, students at The New School in New York City occupied a university building, demanding the resignation of several members of the administration and greater power in university administration, both in solidarity with the Greek students and in protest of the current economy. The students stated that they were inspired by and stood in solidarity with the civil unrest in Greece. In San Francisco, a protest ended in five arrests after protesters attacked businesses at Westfield Mall. In St. Louis, Missouri six people were arrested at a protest that blocked traffic. In Boston, Massachusetts, there was a solidarity demonstration outside the Greek consulate. In Providence, Rhode Island, about thirty people marched through the streets in a funeral procession in solidarity with the uprising in Greece as well as against the war in Gaza.

== Criticism ==
=== Criticism of the Government ===
On 10 December the Communist Party of Greece's Central Committee released a written statement where they said that "an effort is being made by the bourgeoisie state, the ND government to utilise the blind violence of the hooded people, which we are witnessing mainly through the television channels, to check the swelling wave of discontent and popular intervention that is developing."

On 12 December, PASOK leader George Papandreou speaking before his party's political council members blamed the ruling New Democracy government for the recent violent street protests in Athens and other parts of the country. He held the government solely responsible for everything taking place in the country, stated that "the government itself is the problem" and called for early elections so that, the Greek people will be able to provide a clear mandate.

On the same day, MP Adonis Georgiades of the Popular Orthodox Rally accused the political leadership of the Greek police for giving orders to the riot police not to intervene effectively to stop the riots at their initial stage. Also Popular Orthodox Rally proposed a project that anyone hooded should be arrested, to stop university asylum, ban protests and review the role of the army, in order to stop the riots.

In a meeting with police labor unionists, Alekos Alavanos the parliamentary leader of Synaspismos criticised the government for using the riot police as their own "army", he also, asked for an inter-party committee to examine the responsibilities and rights of the Greek police, whereas Alexis Tsipras, the president of Synaspismos, declared that the situation is indeed very grim and that the Greek government needs to find solutions for the actual causes of this "new social phenomenon".

=== Criticism of the Coalition of the Radical Left ===
Aleka Papariga, then Secretary General of the Communist Party of Greece, called the leadership of the Coalition of the Radical Left (SYRIZA) to "stop patting the hooded rioters on the back". Georgios Karatzaferis, president of the Popular Orthodox Rally, also stated that "there are some political powers that are serious, and some that pat them on the back ...". Alexis Tsipras, SYRIZA president, replied "we don't pat them on the back, and we don't take the role of the state's prosecutor either". He attacked the Communist Party, describing it as a conservative power that is disturbed when the youth spontaneously storm the streets. He also stated that the young people of the country have reached a deadlock, and this deadlock and their problems force them to the streets.

On Thursday 11th, president of Popular Orthodox Rally Georgios Karatzaferis referred to a press release of the newspaper Adesmeutos Typos which, he claimed, had an MP of the Coalition supporting "the terrorism" instead of condemning the riots. Alekos Alavanos replied that, "Some have lost sense of what they say and what antidemocratic consequences their sayings might bring". On Friday 12th, in the parliament, MPs of both ruling New Democracy and the PASOK opposition criticised SYRIZA for not condemning the riots, and for Alexis Tsipras's statement that "the struggle must be moved in the schools".

On Sunday 15th, Alexis Tsipras, former president of SYRIZA called an unscheduled press conference where he dismissed criticism and decried what he called "slanderous" statements against the recent protests, he also added that "Synaspismos and its affiliated Parliamentary group, SYRIZA, are in an ideological conflict with the hooded gangs, because violence brings forth violence and leads to an impasse".

=== Criticism of the media ===
'Breaking news' bulletins and other mass media accounts of the shooting reported that an unprovoked attack had taken place against the police, favoring a narrative of 'riots in Exarcheia' that sidelined or trivialized the death of Alexandros Grigoropoulos. However, the existence of eyewitness video footage of the event and its circulation along with other alternative accounts on social media, changed the predominant perception from one of an (Protesters) attack against police officers in the 'notorious' neighborhood of Exarcheia to one of a 'rogue' policeman killing a kid. Nevertheless, media coverage uncritically reproduced the initial police report and persisted in promoting a flawed scenario of the events when the 'awkward facts' were clear to most people.

On 9 December, a photographer working for the newspaper Eleftheros Typos, who had taken on 7 December some snap-shots of a policeman targeting protesters with his gun, was fired, as the paper's editor claimed he was responsible for the leakage of the photos in the Internet. The photographer claimed the photos were not any more in his possession in the time of the leak, said that the editor was unwilling to publish them and denounced his sack as an attempt of political censorship, while left-wing newspapers and websites noted the editor's pro-government stance during the riots. The same newspaper received harsh criticism for misquoting Isocrates in its front page of 10 December.

The Greek National Council for Radio and Television cautioned the country's broadcast media stations in their coverage of the riots.

== Financial consequences for the Greek economy ==
After the first days of demonstrations and the presentation of the 2009 state budget that predicted solid economic growth in spite of the Great Recession, the spread of the Greek 10-year Government bonds had, by 12 December 2008, widened to 230 basis points against the corresponding German Government bonds (Bundesanleihen), a level that represents the highest level for the past nine years and the highest since the country entered the eurozone. This had an immediate effect on the cost of financing for Greece's government; these costs rose considerably as a higher yield had to be paid on any bonds it sold. In addition, and given the credit crisis prevalent at the time, this curtailed its ability to issue bonds at all since investors were more risk averse than normal.

Additionally, on Wednesday, 17 December 2008, the credit rating agency Moody's declared it would put Greece's credit rating, already the lowest in the Eurozone at A1, off positive outlook if political and economic instability continued.

== See also ==
- 1981 England riots
- 1992 Los Angeles riots
- 2001 Argentina riots
- 2005 civil unrest in France
- 2006 Dublin riots
- 2006 youth protests in France
- 2011 England riots
- 2013 protests in Turkey
- 2014 Ferguson unrest
- 2021 Greek protests
- George Floyd protests
- Anarchism in Greece
