= Riot dog =

Stray dog accompanying street protesters

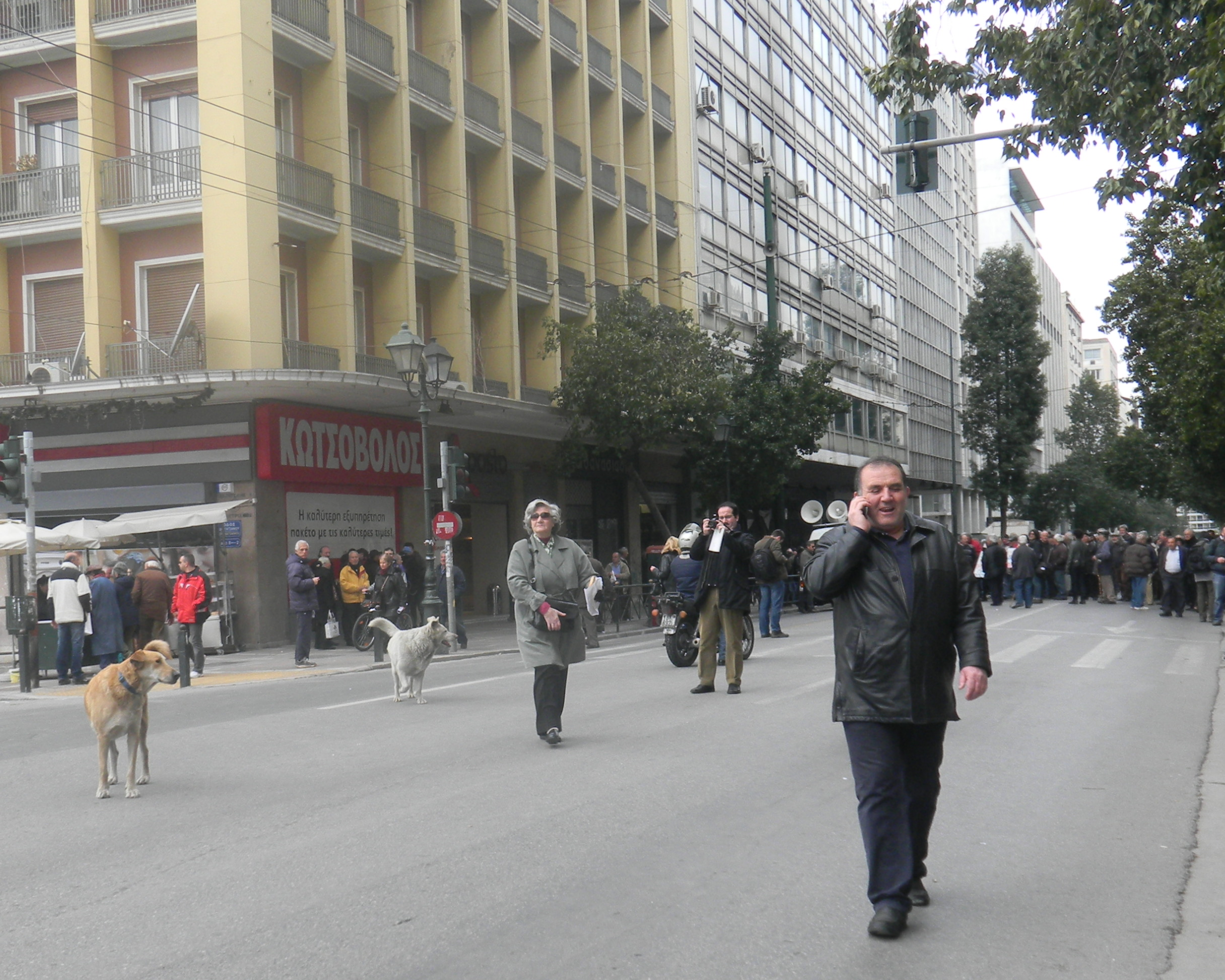
Kanellos (left) and another dog at a 2012 protest

A riot dog is a stray dog that accompanies street protesters. The term originated during the 2008 Greek riots when a number of stray dogs remained among the protesters even when violent rioting broke out. A few riot dogs have acquired a large following of fans around the world such as the Greek Loukanikos and Negro Matapacos in Chile.

== In Greece ==
=== Loukanikos ===
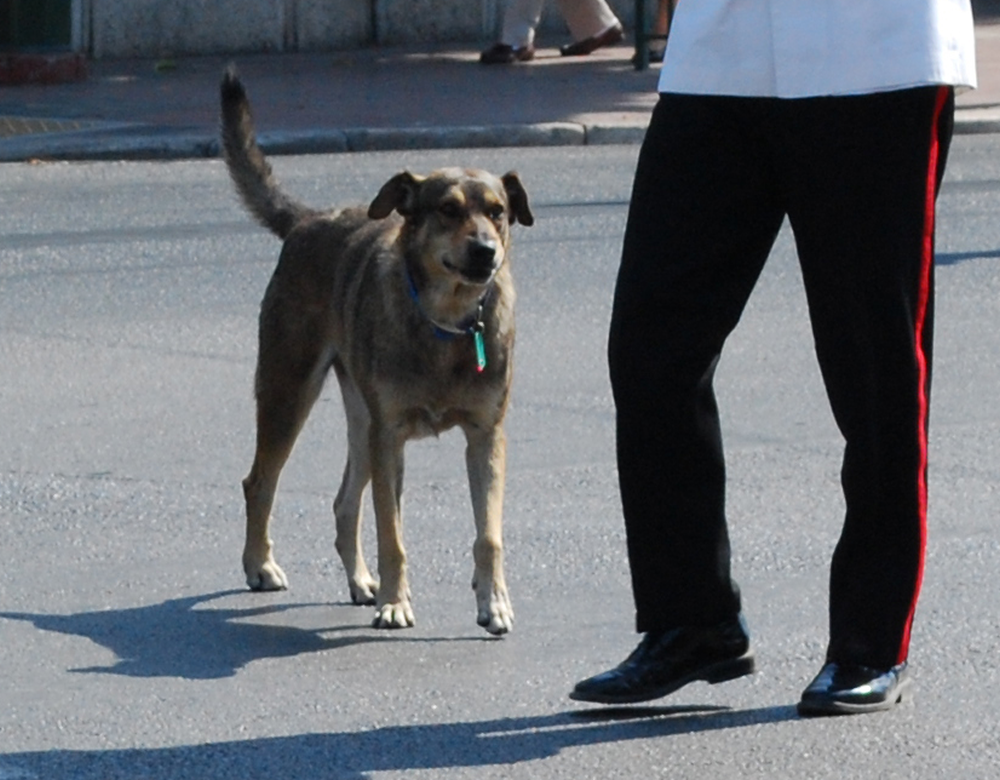
Loukanikos in 2009

Loukanikos (Λουκάνικος: the sausage loukaniko) or more commonly Louk (Λουκ), sometimes confused by the media for Kanellos, was present at nearly every protest in Athens up until 2012. This stray has ostensibly become the symbol of Greek protests against the IMF- and ECB-prompted austerity measures. There was uncertainty about the claim that Loukanikos and Thodoris may, in fact, be the same dog however this was later confirmed false after Loukanikos died.

In September 2011, on the occasion of a striking policemen's union marching in the centre of Athens, Loukanikos, according to eyewitnesses, was "initially confused" between two opposite sides both of uniformed policemen but, when the riot police contingent attacked their striking colleagues, the dog sided with "those who were being attacked."

Loukanikos' health was "severely burdened" by the inhaling of tear gas and other chemicals during the many riots in which he participated but lived until approximately ten years of age, dying peacefully in 2014 at the home of a person who cared for him.

=== Kanellos ===
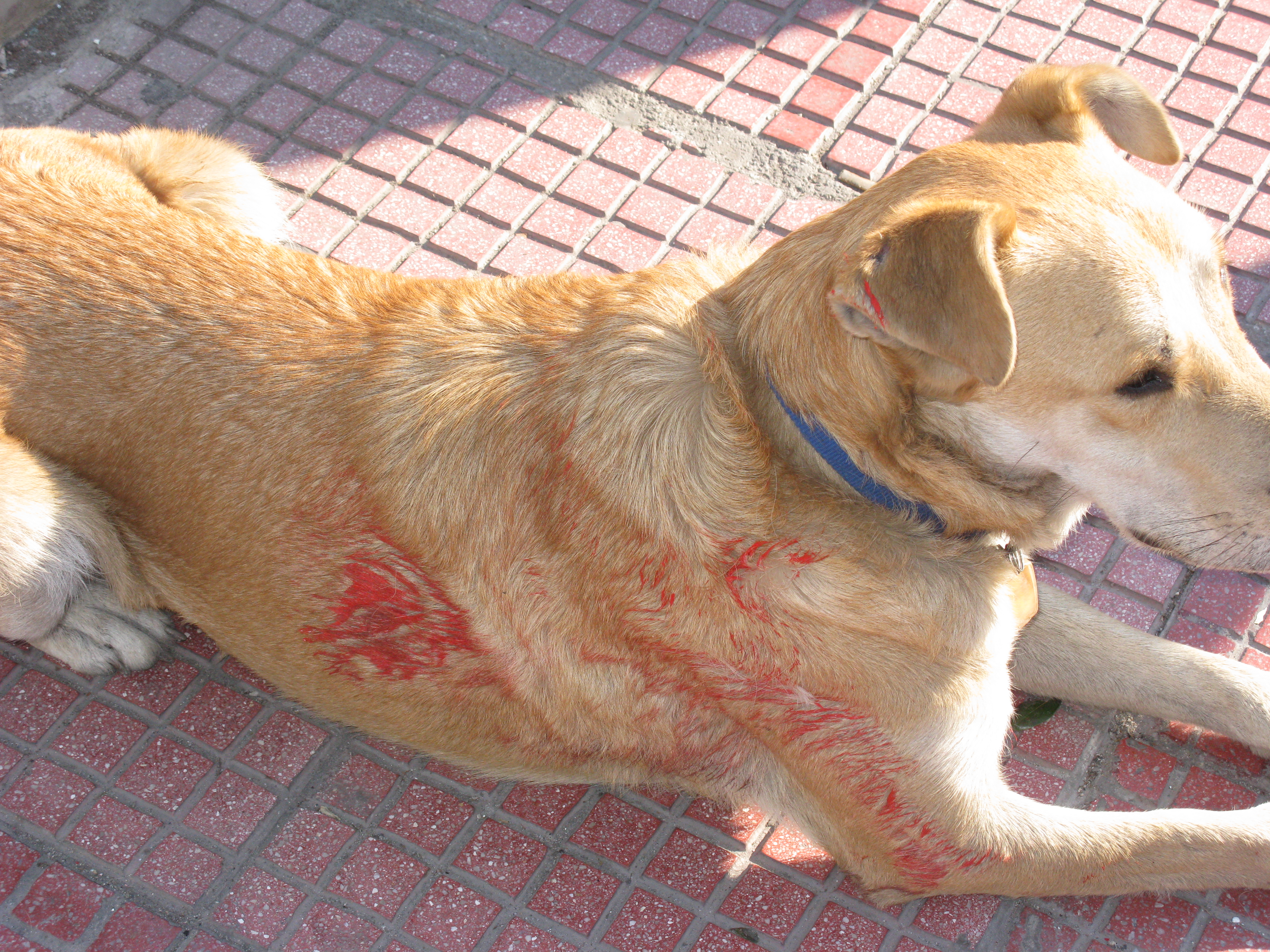
Kanellos splashed with red paint in 2008

Kanellos (Greek: Κανέλλος: cinnamon), a distinct blond, male, mixed-breed canine, was arguably the first incarnation of the Greek Riot Dog. His maiden appearance was in photographs taken at a general assembly of students in the occupied National Technical University of Athens. Kanellos became famous in the 2008 Greek riots, when Greek photographers and cameramen started to notice a dog that kept appearing in their footage. The stray seemed to always walk amongst and side with the protesters.

According to reports by witnesses, Kanellos, in his final years, suffered from arthritis, which motivated a group of college students to collect money and purchase him a dog's wheelchair. This allowed him to live indoors, among the students, until he died.

=== Thodoris ===
Thodoris (Θοδωρής) is a Kanellos look-alike, believed to be one of Kanellos' pups. Thodoris is a light golden-colored, mixed breed dog, who, despite being a stray, has seemingly been provided with all the necessary medical shots, as evidenced by his blue collar.

== In Chile ==
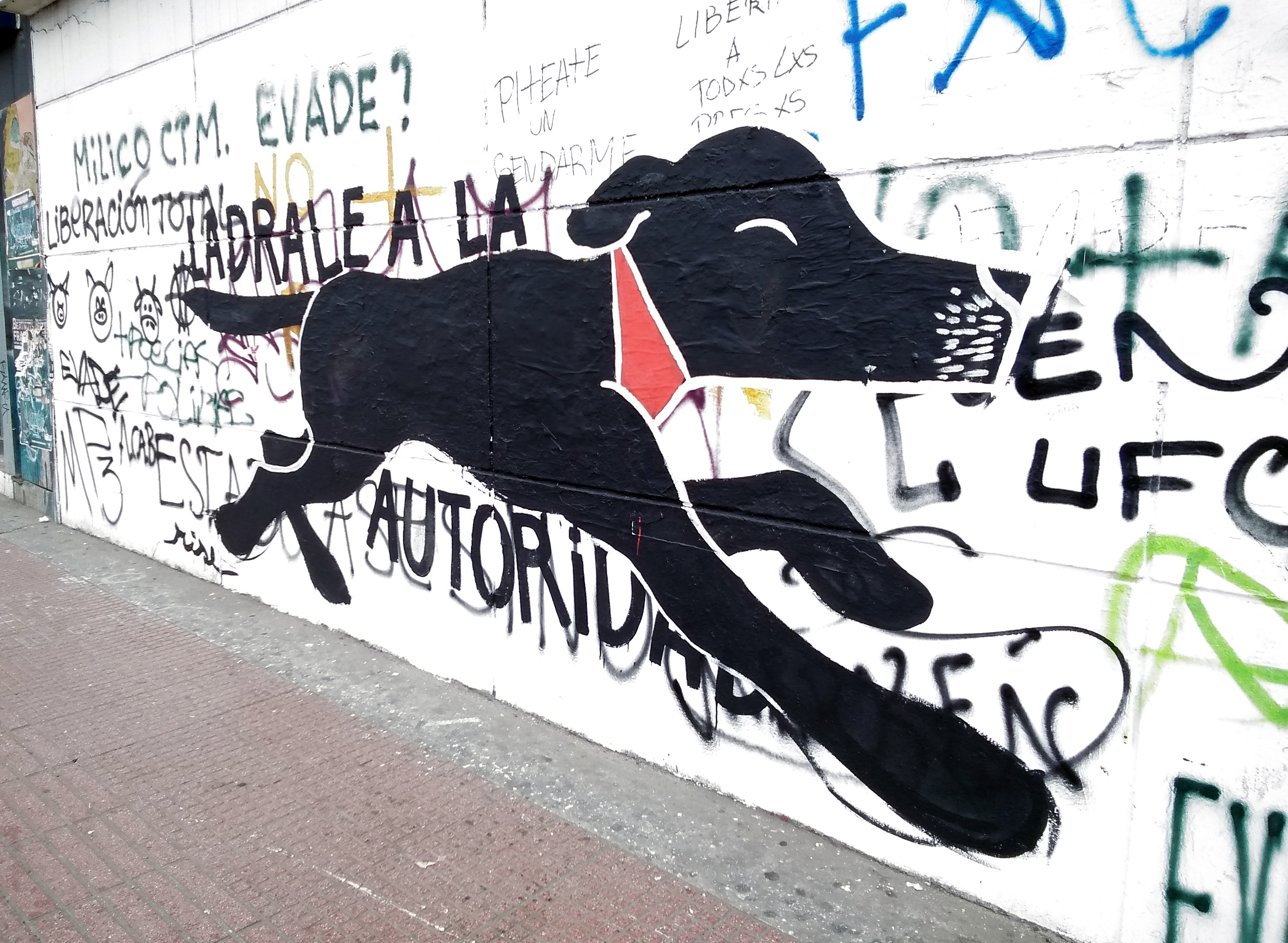
A graffiti of Negro Matapacos

In Chile, during the 2011–2013 Chilean student protests, a stray dog accompanied student protestors. Protesters named him "Negro Matapacos" (from Spanish matar, to kill, and paco, which is Chilean slang for "policeman"; his full nickname therefore translates to "Black Cop-killer"), or refer to him simply as "El Negro". Matapacos died on 26 August 2017 of old age with a veterinarian and other people by his side.

During the 2019 Chilean protests, the image of Negro Matapacos acquired notoriety again, and protesters drew inspiration from him during street demonstrations, appearing on various posters, stickers, murals and papier-mâché sculptures. Some people also requested that a statue of the dog be installed in a public place.

== See also ==
- 2008 Greek riots
- 2010–2011 Greek protests
- List of individual dogs
