= Loukanikos =

Greek riot dog (2004? - 2014)

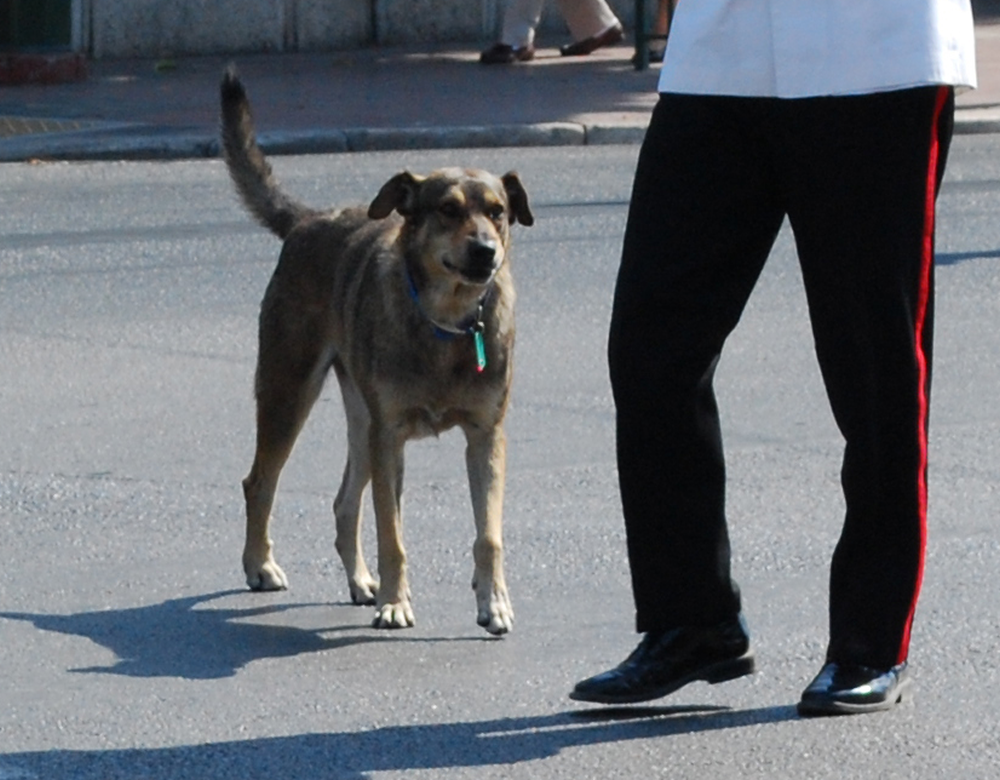
Loukanikos during protests in Athens, 2009

Loukanikos (Greek: Λουκάνικος: "the sausage loukaniko"), initially named "Theodoros", (Athens, 2004 — Athene, May 2014) was a Greek riot dog that participated in almost every anti-austerity protest in Greece. He was commonly known for joining protests, barking at police, helping in street battles with the Greek police as well as participating in anarchist rallies and picket lines, at least since December 2008. The dog had a reputation of being fearless, usually being in front of the protests and having tear gas thrown at him multiple times.

Loukanikos was active throughout all Greek protests and often led the protesters towards the police. Initially a stray, he moved from building to building, but was said to have preferred to be on the streets. He was groomed and cared for by multiple left-wing organizations.

== Biography ==
BBC's Newsnight created a video montage of the dog in action during protests in Greece, including barking at police in riot gear and running with other protesters away from tear gas. He was nominated for person of the year in 2011 by Time magazine.

In September 2011, on the occasion of a striking policemen's union marching in the centre of Athens, he was "initially confused" between two opposite sides, both of uniformed policemen, but when the riot police contingent attacked their striking colleagues, the dog sided with those who were being attacked.

Loukanikos died in 2014 at the age of ten. This was due to health problems because of ingestion of tear gas, which he sustained due to constant protests. A memorial and large burial was held shortly after. Loukanikos is the subject of a large number of monuments and murals, and there is also a restaurant in Madrid named after him.

== See also ==
- 2008 Greek riots
- Negro Matapacos
