= Negro Matapacos =

Chilean dog famous for protest involvement

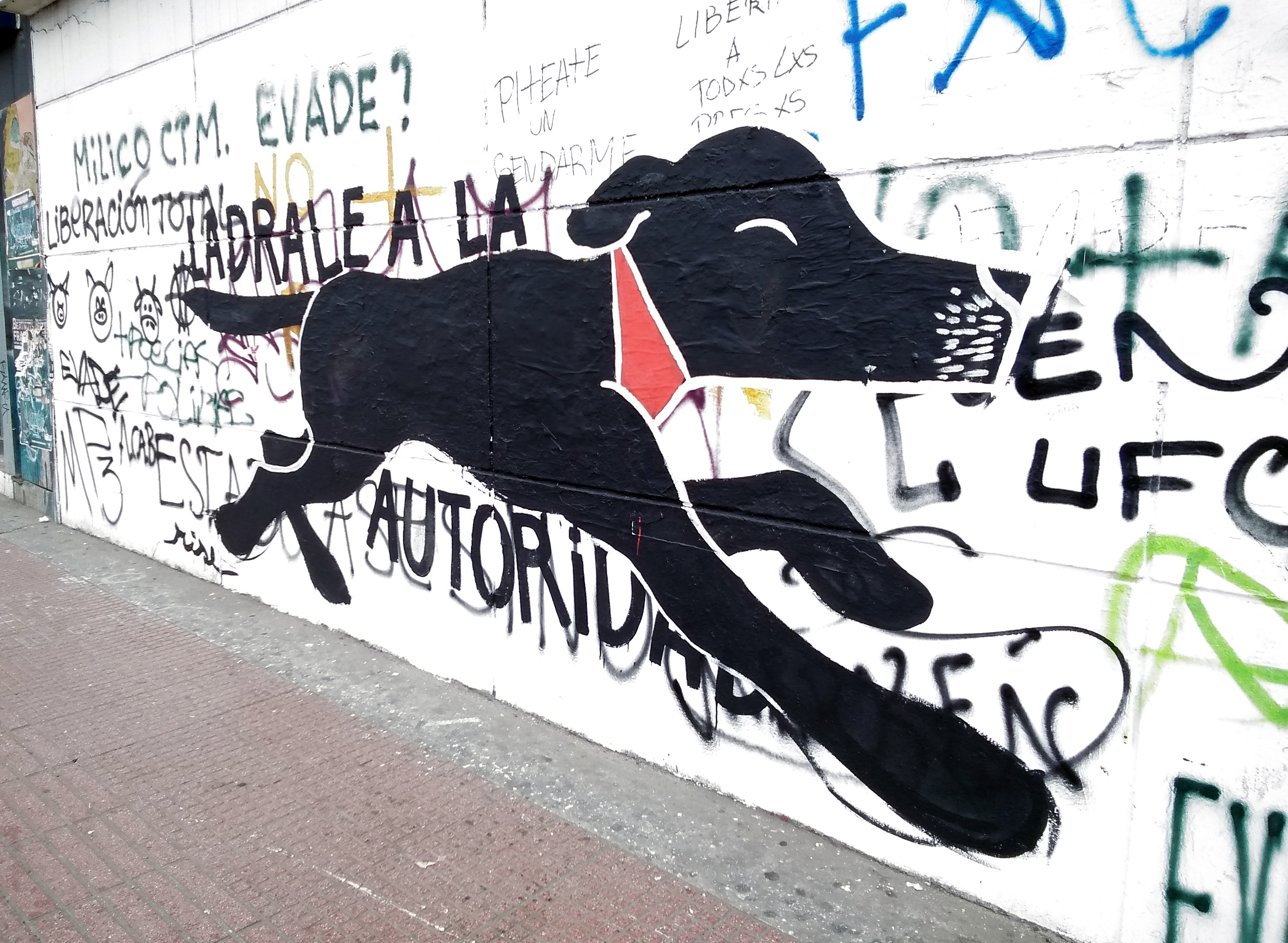
- A graffito of Negro Matapacos at La Cisterna
- Species: Canis familiaris
- Sex: Male
- Died: 26 August 2017 (age 12); Santiago, Chile
- Owner: María Campos

Negro Matapacos (translated as "Black Cop-Killer") was a riot dog that participated in the 2011–2013 Chilean student protests in Santiago, Chile. He later became a symbol in the 2019–2020 Chilean protests as a sort of resistance to police brutality and to represent the fight for dignity. He has had graffiti and statues made in his honor throughout the country and even outside of Chile, such as in the Decolonize This Place subway protests in New York City in 2019. He was notable for his black fur and the red handkerchief that was tied around his neck, although he also had a blue and a white handkerchief that his caregiver also put on him.

His name came from Spanish matar (to kill) and paco, which is Chilean slang for "policeman".

== Biography ==
The dog gained fame among the university circles of Santiago, mainly in the universities of Santiago (Usach), Metropolitan of Technology (UTEM) and Central (Ucen). During the 2011 student protests Negro Matapacos became known for participating in the street marches and attacking members of Carabineros de Chile, which garnered the sympathies of the Chilean protesters.

Although Negro Matapacos was considered a stray dog, due to its presence in different university headquarters and streets of Santiago, he was under the care of María Campos, who adopted him in 2009 and who fed him, had a bed for him in her residence, tied his handkerchiefs around his neck, and blessed him before he went out. During his participation in street demonstrations, several media outlets also called him the "Chilean Loukanikos", due to his similarities with the dog that became famous during the protests in Greece between 2010 and 2012.

Negro Matapacos died on 26 August 2017, attended by veterinary personnel and caregivers. Various sources mention that at the time of his death he had left descendants of 32 puppies with 6 different dogs.

== Legacy ==
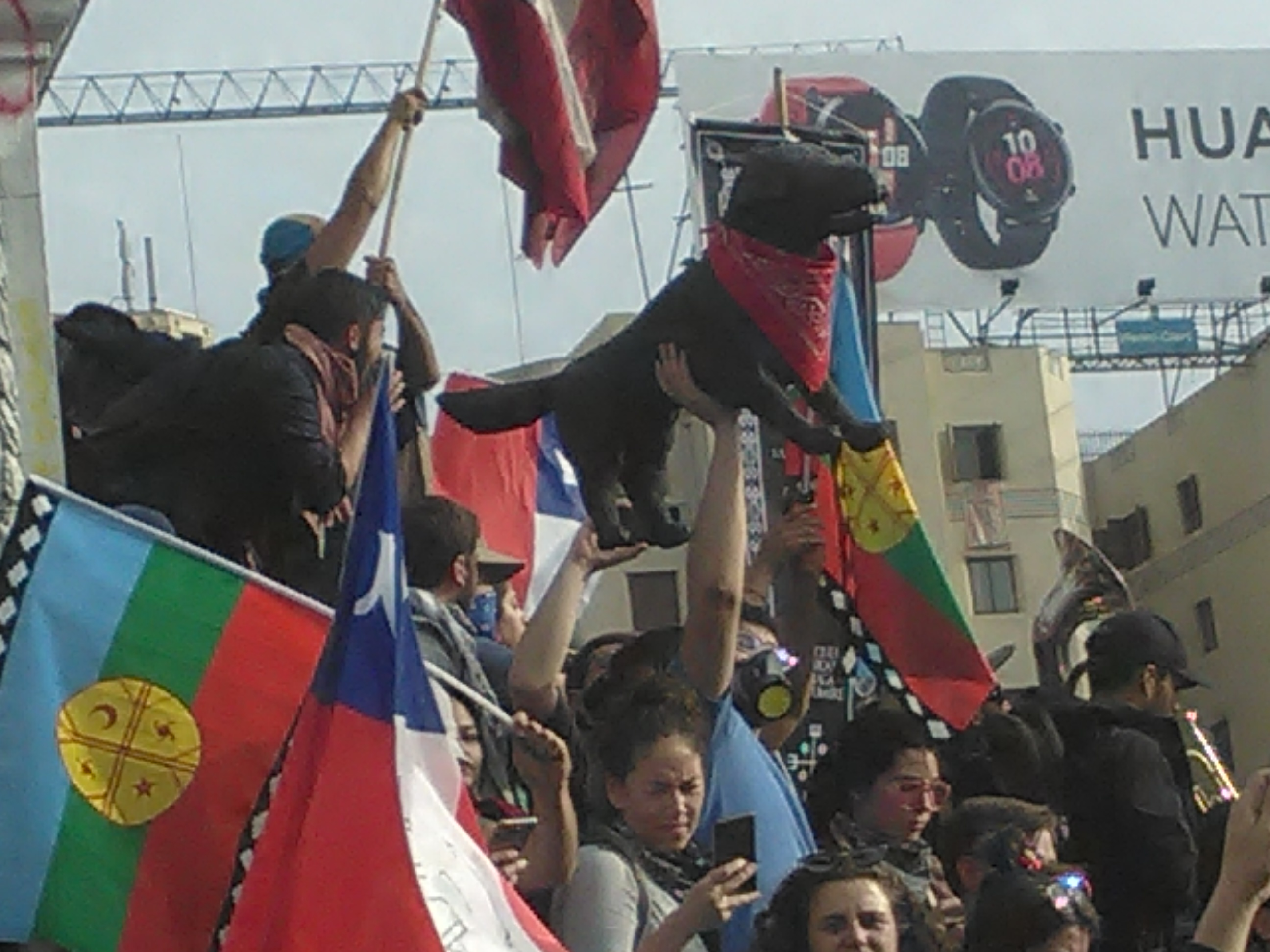
Papier-mâché sculpture of Negro Matapacos, displayed during a protest at Plaza Baquedano.

In December 2013 the documentary Matapaco was released, made by Víctor Ramírez, Carolina García, Nayareth Nain, Francisco Millán and Sergio Medel of EnMarcha Films, and which won the Best Documentary award at the Santo Tomás Festival in Viña del Mar.

During the 2019 Chilean protests, the image of Negro Matapacos acquired notoriety again, and protesters drew inspiration from him during street demonstrations, appearing on various posters, stickers, murals and papier-mâché sculptures. Some people also requested that a statue of the dog be installed in a public place.

Tributes have also been made outside of Chile, such as in Japan on 14 November 2019, where the statue of Hachikō outside Shibuya station in Tokyo was adorned with a red handkerchief, similar to that worn by Negro Matapacos. On 18 November 2019, the statue of Balto at Central Park in New York City was adorned in the same way.. He was also represented in Wellington, New Zealand, when Anarchists took a red bandana and placed it on the neck of a statue of Fritz, a dog owned by an early European settler to the city. https://libcom.org/article/negro-matapacos-wellington

During the mass evasions that took place on 1 November of the same year in the New York City Subway in protest of the police's repression of a fare evader, many stickers with the image of Negro Matapacos jumping a turnstile appeared in New York City Subway stations.

== See also ==
- List of individual dogs
