= Vasileios E. Vekiarellis =

Greek journalist and writer (1887–1944)

Vasileios E. Vekiarellis (1887–1944) was a Greek journalist and writer.

== Biography ==
Vasileios E. Vekiarellis worked in Athenian newspapers and served as director of the Athens News Agency. He published articles in the magazine Filotechnos at Volos. He issued the famous monograph The Major Problems: God, the universe, man (Athens, 1938), which was awarded by the Apostolic Diakonia of the Church of Greece. He was one of the founding members of ESIEA.

Vekiarellis sought the dissemination of pacifist ideas, which rallied Europe’s intellectuals after World War I, by writing for his anti-war ideas in magazines of Alexandria that had been strongly in line with the European intelligentsia anti-war initiatives. In the article Your Life - My Life: a review of the post war pacifist movement (Erevna Magazine, Alexandria, March 1930, p. 3-29), Vekiarellis notably stated, "A future war between the countries of Europe would mark the end of our civilization. [...] Delphi according to the grand plan of Angelos and Eva Sikelianos, which has already begun to be implemented, will be the intellectual center not only of the Greek people, but of all peoples. The love for the mother land which Angelos Sikelianos propagates means love among people, it means peace." Στο άρθρο του Βεκιαρέλλη «‘‘Η Ζωή σου Ζωή μου’’. Επισκόπησις της μεταπολεμικής ειρηνιστικής κινήσεως»

This article of Vekiarellis urged C.P. Cavafy to express his strong interest in the Delphic vision, according to relevant documents of the Greek Literary and Historical Archive (ELIA), where Cavafy expressed his opinions on the necessity for rallying intellectuals in the after World War I period. These views, which had already been made known abroad following the participation of C.P.Cavafy to the global anti-war poetry anthology of Ivan Goll, Les Cinq Continents: Anthologie mondiale de poésie contemporaine (Paris, 1922), became widely known to the Greek people, after the first Delphic Festival that was warmly welcomed by the Alexandrian entourage of C.P. Cavafy.
