= Murder of Alexandros Grigoropoulos =

2008 shooting in Greece

- Location: Exarchia, Greece
- Date: 6 December 2008
- Attack type: Shooting
- Deaths: 1
- Victim: Alexandros Grigoropoulos
- Perpetrator: Epaminondas Korkoneas

Alexandros Grigoropoulos was a 15-year-old Greek student who was shot dead by the Hellenic Police special guard, Epaminondas Korkoneas, on 6 December 2008 in the Exarchia neighbourhood of Athens. The shooting resulted in widespread riots, clashes and demonstrations in December 2008 throughout Greece, which were characterized as the 2008 Greek riots. His memory is honoured every year with marches on the anniversary of his murder.

== History ==
=== Incident ===
On the evening of 6 December 2008, Grigoropoulos was in Exarcheia with his friend Nikos Romanos. According to reports published shortly after the incident, shortly before 9 p.m. a police patrol car passing through the area was heckled by a group of young men. It was then driven away, but the two police officers returned on foot, and one of them fired his weapon, which resulted in the death of 15-year-old Alexandros Grigoropoulos. According to the forensic examination the bullet penetrated the heart and lodged in the tenth thoracic vertebrae.

=== First reactions ===
Then-Minister of the Interior Prokopis Pavlopoulos submitted his resignation after the incident. However, his resignation was not accepted by Prime Minister Kostas Karamanlis.

An amateur video recording the moment of Grigoropoulos' murder came into the hands of the television station MEGA, which broadcast it altered, adding sounds from a demonstration and broken shop windows before Korkoneas' shots were heard. The station and its news and information director, Christos Panagiotopoulos, were accused of deliberately distorting the video in order to lighten Korkoneas's position. In an article three years later, Panagiotopoulos of MEGA wrote that the alteration of the audio had been done voluntarily by a producer who had been assigned to edit the video.

After being informed of the incident, Deputy Minister of the Interior Panagiotis Chinofotis immediately initiated the procedure to suspend the two special guards, as well as the commander of the Exarchia Police Station. Shortly afterwards, the guards involved were brought to the police station for questioning, while three prosecutors were immediately appointed to investigate the causes of the incident.

The prosecutor brought criminal charges of murder against the special guard who shot Grigoropoulos, and charged his colleague as an accomplice. The President of the Republic, Karolos Papoulias, described the incident as a "trauma to the rule of law" in Greece.

== Criminal proceedings ==
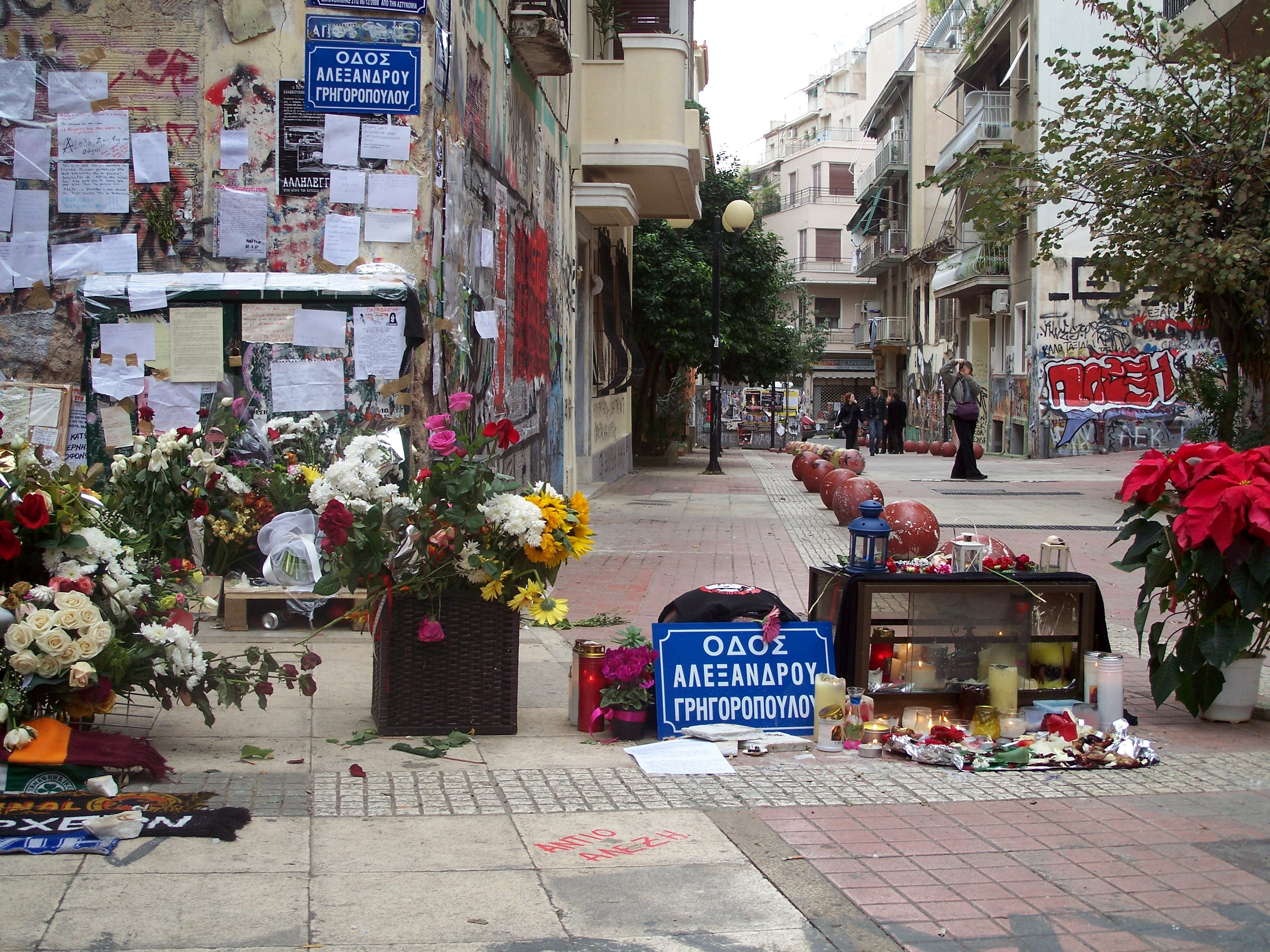
Memorial and offerings at Tzavella Street where the shooting took place.

In his defense to the investigator of the case, Epaminondas Korkoneas claimed that he had fired into the air and not at the group of young men, and therefore the young man's death was an accident, due to the ricochet of a bullet. He also claimed that the deceased was a teenager with deviant behavior. The investigator ordered the pretrial detention of both police officers. The police officer's explanation (about the bullet being ricocheted) was refuted after the results of the forensic investigation showed that the direction of the bullet that lodged in Grigoropoulos' vertebra was from top to bottom (and not from bottom to top, which would have been logical if the bullet had ricocheted onto the road). The coroner's conclusion was: "blind chest wound from a small-caliber firearm - homicide".

The mother appealed for respect for her deceased son in a letter to the media, while the family appointed Dimitris Tsovolas as a representative of the civil lawsuit.

== Trial ==
In June 2009, the Council of Misdemeanors ordered the referral of the two special guards to trial before the First Instance Criminal Court. The special guard who shot the student was referred for intentional homicide, while his colleague for complicity in homicide. The trial of the case was set for 15 December 2009 at the Mixed Assize Court of Chalcis, as there was a view that a trial in Athens would cause further devastation in the city. The case was eventually heard at the Mixed Assize Court of Amfissa due to security concerns.

Finally, the trial began in Amfissa on 20 January 2010, with the parties requesting a few days' postponement. On the same day, a march was held in the town of Amfissa, outside the courts. The trial continued on 22 January, with both defendants pleading not guilty. The president of the court stated that the state was civilly liable for the death of the 15-year-old, to which the victim's family could turn if they wished, with the civil lawsuit expressing the position that the family could also turn civilly against the two police officers, as it considers that the act was committed in violation of an order.

=== Verdict ===
On 11 October 2010, the panel of judges and jurors found both special guards guilty, Korkoneas of intentionally shooting Grigoropoulos and Saraliotis of complicity. Korkoneas was sentenced to life imprisonment (votes 4–3) while Saraliotis was sentenced to ten years in prison (votes 6–1).

The second instance trial began on 9 April 2014, at the Lamia Mixed Court of Appeal. During the first hearing on 23 December 2016, Korkoneas had declared his unrepentant nature, resulting in his lawyer Alexis Kougias withdrawing from his defense.

== Subsequent developments ==
On 30 July 2019, due to the decision of the Court of Appeal, Korkoneas was released from Domokos Prison where he was being held. With the reduced sentence of 13 years, taking into account the sentence he had already served, the court's decision was immediately enforceable.

The appeal against the decision of the Lamia Joint Court of Appeal was requested by the Prosecutor of the Supreme Court, Vasilis Pliotas. In March 2022, the Plenary of the Supreme Court unanimously accepted the appeal of the Prosecutor of the Supreme Court, resulting in a new trial with a new composition, again at the Lamia Joint Court of Appeal.

The trial began in June 2022. The district attorney argued that Korkoneas did not deserve the mitigation he was given and requested his conviction for manslaughter with direct intent and in a calm state of mind. However, the prosecutor's proposal was not accepted - Korkoneas was recognized for his previous honorable life by a narrow margin of 4–3 (the 4 jurors decided in favor of accepting the mitigation and the 3 regular appellate judges decided to reject it). On 28 June, Korkoneas was released from Domokos Detention Center in accordance with the decision.

The Grigoropoulos family's lawyers, Nikos and Zoe Konstantopoulou, made an official request to the Prosecutor of the Supreme Court requesting that he appeal the decision.

On 4 June 2025, the Lamia Mixed Court of Appeal imposed a life sentence on Korkoneas for the murder of Grigoropoulos, rejecting the mitigating factor of his previous criminal record that had led to his release from prison.

== See also ==
- 2008 Greek riots
- Assassination of Michalis Kaltezas
