= Civil Servants' Confederation =

ADEDY
- Confederation of Greek Civil Servants' Trade Unions
- Ανώτατη Διοίκηση Ενώσεων Δημοσίων Υπαλλήλων
- Founded: 1926
- Headquarters: Athens, Greece
- Location: Greece
- Members: 280,000
- Key people: S. Papaspyros, president
- Affiliations: ETUC
- Website: www.adedy.gr

The Confederation of Greek Civil Servants' Trade Unions (Greek: Ανώτατη Διοίκηση Ενώσεων Δημοσίων Υπαλλήλων (ΑΔΕΔΥ), romanized: Anótati Dioíkisi Enóseon Dimosíon Ypallílon, ADEDY), was established in May 1926 under the name Civil Servants' Confederation.

Banned under the Metaxas regime, it began organizing covertly against the regime, as well as the subsequent Nazi Occupation during the Second World War. Officially reorganized after the Greek Civil War, ADEDY is a federation of public sector trade unions in Greece affiliated with the European Trade Union Confederation. ADEDY's private sector sister union is the General Confederation of Greek Workers.

ADEDY is non-partisan, and as such, not affiliated with any political party. Its leadership council is made up of figures from the liberal New Democracy, social democratic PASOK and SYRIZA, the Communist Party of Greece, as well as the anti-capitalist ANT.AR.SY.A. The Communist Party of Greece's official union, the All-Workers Militant Front, has criticized ADEDY regarding the presence of New Democracy and other right-wing and centrist groups in their leadership.

== See also ==
- Trade unions in Greece
