= Louks =

Louks is a surname. Notable people with the surname include:

- Ally Louks (born 1997), English academic
- Courtney Louks (born 1990), known professionally as Courtney Jones, American soccer player

== See also ==
- Loucks
