= Journalists' Union of the Athens Daily Newspapers =

Greek journalists trade union

- Ένωσις Συντακτών Ημερησίων Εφημερίδων Αθηνών
- Abbreviation: Ε.Σ.Η.Ε.Α.
- Formation: 1914
- Type: Trade union
- Headquarters: Athens, Greece
- Region served: Athens
- Members: 2,110
- Affiliations: Panhellenic Federation of Journalists' Unions; European Federation of Journalists; International Federation of Journalists
- Website: Website

The Journalists' Union of the Athens Daily Newspapers (Greek: Ένωσις Συντακτών Ημερησίων Εφημερίδων Αθηνών, romanized: Énosis Syntaktón Imerisíon Efimerídon Athinón, Ε.Σ.Η.Ε.Α.) is a Greek trade union for journalists employed in the daily newspapers and broadcast media in news outlets based in Athens.

It was founded in 1914 in Athens as the Journalists' Union. Among the founding members were Vasileios Vekiarellis and Dionysios Kokkinos. It adopted its current name in 1947.

It has a membership of 2,110 and is a member of the Panhellenic Federation of Journalists' Unions, the European Federation of Journalists and the International Federation of Journalists.

== See also ==
- Trade unions in Greece
