= Trade unions in Greece =

Trade unions in Greece include:

- General Confederation of Greek Workers
- Civil Servants' Confederation
- Kasapi Union
- All-Workers Militant Front
- Greek Trade Union of Cleaners and Housekeepers
- Anarcho-Syndicalist initiative Rocinante.

== Trade unionists in Greece ==
Well-known trade unionists in Greece include:

- Konstantina Kouneva
- Deborah Carlos-Valencia
