= Loucks =

Loucks is a surname. Notable people with the surname include:

- Alvin Loucks (1895–1973), American football player and coach
- Bunky Loucks, American politician
- Ed Loucks, American football player
- G. Dean Loucks (1935–2014), American football coach
- Henry Loucks, American newspaper editor and politician
- Scott Loucks (born 1956), American baseball player
- Steven D. Loucks (born 1961), American politician
- William John Loucks (1873–1967), Canadian politician
