= Melissa Network =

Greece women's organization

- Formation: 2014; 11 years ago
- Headquarters: Viktoria Square, Athens
- Website: melissanetwork.org

The Melissa Network of Migrant Women in Greece is a Greek not for profit organisation that supports needs of migrant women. It was founded in 2014 with the participation of migrant and refugee women leaders.

== Organization ==
Melissa is a network for migrant and refugee women living in Greece. It aims to promote empowerment and active citizenship, and to build a bridge of communication with the host society. Founded in 2014 with the participation of migrant and refugee women leaders, Melissa has members from approximately 50 countries who currently live and/or work in Greece. It operates on the basis of a common platform, a hub where networks and individuals meet, share their concerns and ideas, and support each other in the pursuit of common goals. It provides a safe space of sharing and learning, where women access support, information, and opportunities, pursue their own initiatives, and build their life strategies.

== See also ==
- Greek Council of Refugees
- Immigration to Greece
- 2015 European migrant crisis
