= General Confederation of Greek Workers =

Trade union body in Greece

GSEE
- General Confederation of Greek Workers
- Γενική Συνομοσπονδία Εργατών Ελλάδας
- Founded: 1918
- Headquarters: Athens, Greece
- Location: Greece
- Members: 450,000
- Key people: Giannis Panagopoulos, president
- Affiliations: ITUC, ETUC
- Website: www.gsee.gr

The General Confederation of Greek Workers (Greek: Γενική Συνομοσπονδία Εργατών Ελλάδας, ΓΣΕΕ, GSEE) is the highest, tertiary trade union body in Greece. It was founded in 1918 and is affiliated with the International Trade Union Confederation.

== Overview ==
GSEE is made up of 83 worker unions and 74 departmental secondary confederations. Its primary purpose is defending the interests of all private sector workers in Greece. To that purpose, it negotiates with the employer unions the signing of national union labour agreements and also has the ability to call all workers of the private sector on strike in case the need arises.

GSEE has established a number of supporting institutes. INE/GSEE-ADEDY is tasked with the provision of GSEE and ADEDY, the equivalent of GSEE in the public sector, of formulated scientific data reports which GSEE and ADEDY use for the scientific validations of their argumentation when dealing with the employers. KE.PE.A is tasked with the provision of information and legal advice to all workers and unemployed people in Greece. A.RIS.TOS is tasked with the tracking and filling of the historical evidence of all worker unions in Greece. KANEP/GSEE is tasked with the support of policy of GSEE in education and the R&D field.

== See also ==
- Trade unions in Greece
