= Greek Council of Refugees =

Greek human rights organization

Greek Council for Refugees is a human rights organization founded in 1989. In November 2021 it released a report with Oxfam criticizing Greece's policies of immigration detention.
