= Greek Merchant Marine =

Fleet of merchant vessels that are registered in Greece

Greek merchant marine
- Company type: Shipping industry
- Industry: Shipping
- Products: LNG and LPG ships, Cargo Ships, Tankers, Container ships, Bulk carriers etc.

Greek Merchant Navy flag used between 1822 and 1828

State and Merchant ensign since 1828, with minor changes made throughout the years.

The Hellenic Merchant Navy refers to the merchant navy of Greece, engaged in commerce and transportation of goods and services globally. It consists of the merchant vessels owned by Greek civilians, flying either the Greek flag or a flag of convenience. As of 2020, Greece is the largest ship owner country in the world in terms of tonnage; with a total deadweight tonnage of 364 million tons and 4,901 Greek-owned vessels. Greece is a maritime nation by tradition, as shipping is arguably the oldest occupation of the Greeks and a key element of Greek economic activity since ancient times. Today it is the second largest contributor to the national economy after tourism. The Greek fleet flies a variety of flags; however, some Greek shipowners gradually return to Greece following the changes to the legislative framework governing their operations and the improvement of infrastructure.

== History ==
Greece is a maritime nation by tradition, as shipping is arguably the oldest form of occupation of the Greeks and has been a key element of Hellenic economic activity since ancient times. The Greeks continued to be involved and play a major role in shipping during the Byzantine period as well as during the Ottoman period, and Greek ships could be found especially in the ports of the eastern Mediterranean.

In 1860s and after the War of Independence, the financial crisis saw some of these businesses collapse Nonetheless, the tradition of endowment continued, and it was shipping that funded institutions such as the National Library of Greece.

During the Second World War the Greek shipping companies were seen operating in the Allied areas and placing their fleets under control of the British Merchant Marine.

After the end of World War II the Greek-run fleets were able to re-establish themselves under their national flag. The changing dynamics saw them more closely aligned to their own national state, and the establishment of the Greek Merchant Marine service.

== Development in Asia ==
Greek firms have managed to capture the expansion of Asia, particularly China. It is mostly the dry bulk shipping firms that have benefited from the development, since iron ore and coal are the two major resources that are required for a country's infrastructure to be taken to the next level.

Since 2000, China has provided lucrative contracts both on the spot, and time charter market for dry bulk shipowners. As a result, many new shipping tycoons were created.

== Shipowners ==
Traditionally Greek shipping has been run as a family business, with family members located in key ports or in key positions, and in the past with marriages cementing relationships between commercial dynasties. These close-knit families have allowed financially sensitive information to be kept within the local community, with many transactions kept within trusted family networks. Some historic shipping families include:

From the 18th century:

- Kountouriotis from Hydra (island)
- Miaoulis (Vokos) from Hydra (island)

19th century:

- Embirikos from Andros
- Goulandris from Andros
- Kourtzis from Lesbos
- Lemos from Oinousses
- Lyras family from Oinousses
- Mavroleon family from Kasos
- Rethymnis family from Kasos
- Hadjilias family from Kasos
- Kulukundis family from Kasos
- Hadjipateras from Oinousses
- Pateras from Oinousses Chios
- Fafalios from Chios
- Pittas family from Chios
- Ralli Brothers from Chios
- Michalinos from Chios
- Rodocanachi from Chios
- Valmas from Syros

Panayis Athanase Vagliano, from Cephalonia, considered the "father of modern Greek shipping"

The twentieth century saw more Greek shipping magnates established, including:

- Alafouzos from Santorini
- Angelopoulos from Arcadia, Peloponnese
- Chandris from Chios
- Carras from Chios
- Eugenidis from Western Thrace
- Frangou from Chios
- Kulukundis and Mavroleon from Kasos
- Latsis from Katakolo, Peloponnese
- Livanos from Chios
- Marinakis from Crete
- Niarchos from Sparti
- Peratikos from Syros & Chios
- Polemis from Andros
- Houlis from Piraeus
- Onassis from Smyrna
- Soutos from Samos
- Vardinogiannis from Crete
- Vernicos from Sifnos

Contemporary (21st century) shipowners include also:

- John Angelicoussis from Athens
- Vassilis C. Constantakopoulos from Messinia
- George Economou (shipbuilder)
- Minos Kyriakou from Poros
- Dimitris Melissanidis from Athens
- Pericles Panagopoulos from Athens
- Leon Patitsas from Cyprus
- George Prokopiou from Athens
- Nikolas Tsakos from Chios

== Greek shipping companies ==
Some notable Greek shipping companies include:

- Aegean Oil
- Aegean Speed Lines (ferries)
- Andriaki Shipping
- Alpha Lines
- ANEK Lines (ferries)
- Atlas Maritime
- Attica Group (ferries)
- Arcadia Shipmanagement Co. Ltd
- Avin International
- Blue star (ferries)
- Capital Product Partners L.P.
- Costamare
- Ceres LNG Services
- Danaos Corporation
- Delta Tankers
- DryShips Inc
- Excel Maritime Carriers Ltd
- European Seaways
- Euroseas Ltd.
- Hellenic Seaways
- Kefalonian Lines
- Levante ferries
- Euroseas Ltd.
- Maran Tankers
- Majestic International Cruises
- Navios Maritime Holdings
- Nereus Shipping S.A. / CM Lemos
- NGM Energy/Shipping
- Ocean Rig
- Overseas Shipholding Group- Stelmar Ltd
- Polembros Maritime
- Star Bulk Carriers
- Superfast Ferries (ferries)
- Tsakos Energy Navigation
- Variety Cruises

== Ranks and rank insignia ==
Deck Officers

Shoulder rank insignia of a deck cadet or apprentice officer of the Greek Merchant Marine (Dokimos Ploiarchos/Δόκιμος Πλοίαρχος)

Shoulder rank insignia of a lieutenant or 2nd officer or captain class C of the Greek Merchant Marine (Anthypoploiarchos/Ανθυποπλοίαρχος)

Shoulder rank insignia of a lieutenant commander or chief officer or captain class B of the Greek Merchant Marine (Ypoploiarchos/Υποπλοίαρχος)

Shoulder rank insignia of a staff captain of the Greek Merchant Marine (Yparchos/Ύπαρχος)

Shoulder rank insignia of a master or captain class A of the Greek Merchant Marine (Ploiarchos/Πλοίαρχος)

Engineer officers

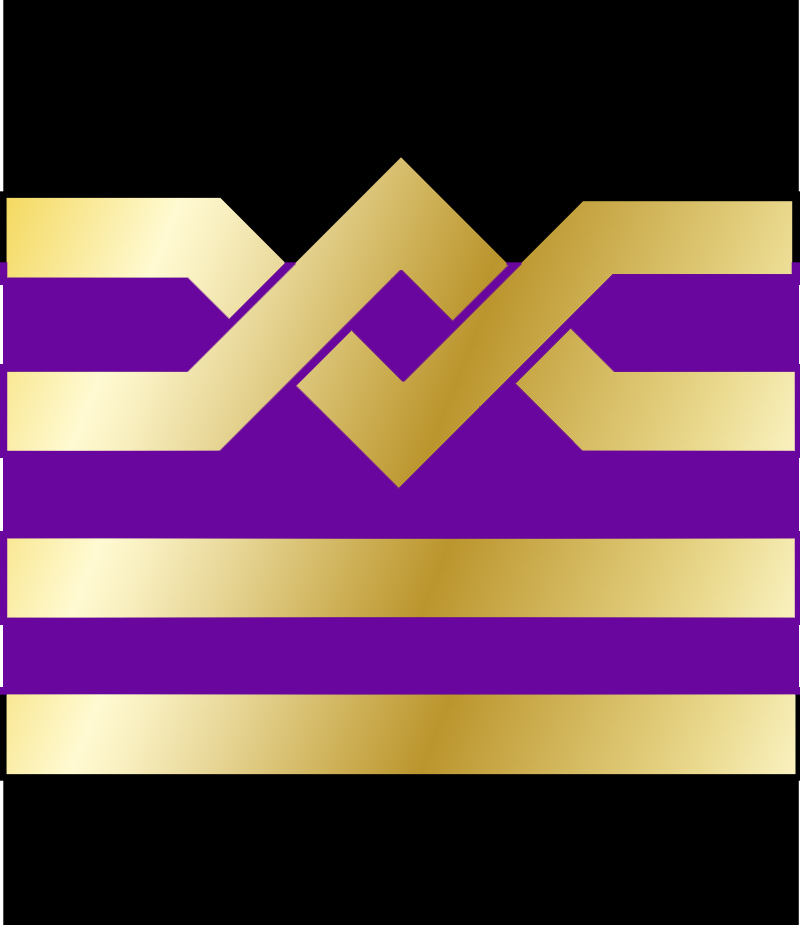
Shoulder rank insignia of a Chief Engineer or Engineer class a of the Greek Merchant Marine (Alfa Michanikos/Α Μηχανικός)

Engineer officers use exactly the same rank insignia as deck officers. The only difference is that "in between" the golden stripes, the color is not black but dark purple. In some cases, dark red has been used; however, dark red refers usually to electrician officers. Engineer officers come from the same Merchant Marine academies as bridge officers. After graduation from the Marine Academy, bridge officers undergoing a series of rigorous training in order to specialize for specific types of ships that they are about to serve on board (LNGC, LPG, VLCC, Dry Cargo, Suezmaxes, Ro/Pax, ULCC etc.) and to meet the stringent requirements of various international conventions (SOLAS, STCW, MARPOL etc.) and companies' managing systems. Some of the training options include (but are not limited to) the following: advanced oil/gas/chemical tanker training, ECDIS, ISM, ISPS, heavy weather navigation, cargo control systems and procedures, navigation deck simulators, electronic navigation systems, integrated navigation systems (INS), radio communications, dynamic positioning systems (DP), passage planning and procedures etc. All of the above training takes place in private marine education centers approved by the Hellenic Government and internationally by the IMO. All other officers found on board Hellenic Merchant Marine Vessels come from universities and other higher education institutes.

Rank exceptions

There are two more ranks that can be found on Hellenic Merchant Marine vessels, namely staff captain and staff chief engineer. Both these ranks can be found only on passenger and cruiser-pleasure yachts. These officers assist the captain and the chief engineer in turn while both have acquired the diploma of captain and chief engineer. However, they have a smaller service record and wait for their turn for the top of the line rank. Note that the highest ranks that can be obtained in the Hellenic Merchant Marine are the captain and the chief engineer, and both officers come from the Merchant Marine Academy. No other type of officer can reach these ranks.

Other officers

Other officers that serve on board Hellenic Merchant Marine vessels are economic officers, electricians, doctors and radio officers.

Promotions

Hellenic Merchant Marine officers get their promotions after a 2-year service period from 2nd officer rank to chief officer rank and after 6 months of studies and exams at the KESEN center. KESEN stands for Center of Further Education and Training of Masters and Officers. To become captain requires a 2-year sea service period and 15 days of studies and exams at the KESEN center. All other officers are promoted after evaluations from the ship owning company.

== See also ==
- List of ports in Greece
- Aristotle Onassis
- List of Greek companies
- Economy of Greece
- Greek Steamship Company (also Hellenic Steam Navigation Co. and New Greek Steamship Co.)
- Greeks of the Sea, a TV documentary screened on SBS ONE in Australia from 19 July to 2 August 2014
