= Corporate spin-off =

Action where a company splits off part as a separate entity

A corporate spin-off, also known as a spin-out, starburst or hive-off, is a type of corporate action where a company "splits off" a section as a separate business or creates a second incarnation, even if the first is still active. It is distinct from a sell-off, where a company sells a section to another company or firm in exchange for cash or securities.

== Characteristics ==
Spin-offs are divisions of companies or organizations that then become independent businesses with assets, employees, intellectual property, technology, or existing products that are taken from the parent company. Shareholders of the parent company receive equivalent shares in the new company to compensate for the loss of equity in the original stocks. However, shareholders may then buy and sell stocks from either company independently; this potentially makes investment in the companies more attractive, as potential share purchasers can invest narrowly in the portion of the business they think will have the most growth.

In contrast, divestment can also sever one business from another, but the assets are sold off rather than retained under a renamed corporate entity.

Many times, the management team of the new company is from the same parent organization. Often, a spin-off offers the opportunity for a division to be backed by the company but not be affected by the parent company's image or history, giving potential to take existing ideas that had been languishing in an old environment and help them grow in a new environment. Spin-offs also allow high-growth divisions, once separated from other low-growth divisions, to command higher valuation multiples.

In most cases, the parent company or organization offers support in one or more of the following:

- Investing equity in the new firm
- Being the first customer of the spin-off that helps create cash flow
- Providing incubation space (desk, chairs, phones, Internet access, etc.)
- Providing legal, finance, or technology services

All support from the parent company is provided to helping the spin-off grow. The quality of this support is dependant upon the effectiveness of the collaboration between the CEO and the management team of the parent company.

=== U.S. Securities and Exchange Commission ===
The United States Securities and Exchange Commission's (SEC) definition of "spin-off" is more precise. Spin-offs occur when the equity owners of the parent company receive equity stakes in the newly spun-off company. For example, when Agilent Technologies was spun off from Hewlett-Packard (HP) in 1999, the stockholders of HP received Agilent stock. A company not considered a spin-off in the SEC's definition (but considered by the SEC as a technology transfer or licensing of technology to the new company) may also be called a spin-off in common usage.

=== Other definitions ===
A second definition of a spin-out is a firm formed when an employee or group of employees leaves an existing entity to establish an independent start-up. The prior employer can be a firm, a university, or another organization. Spin-outs typically operate at arm's length from the previous organizations and have independent sources of financing, products, services, customers, and other assets. In some cases, the spin-out may license technology from the parent or supply the parent with products or services; conversely, they may become competitors. Such spin-outs are important sources of technological diffusion in high-tech industries.

Terms such as hive-up, hive down, or hive across are sometimes used for transferring a business to a parent company, a subsidiary company, or a fellow subsidiary.

== Reasons for spin-offs ==
Companies pursue a spin-off when they believe the value of operating separately would exceed their current value as a single company. This strategy narrows the focus of both companies and allows for specialized management expertise, focused strategies tailored to different growth trajectories, and enhanced scrutiny from securities analysts, potentially increasing the value for shareholders.

One of the main reasons for what The Economist has dubbed the 2011 "starburst revival" is that "companies seeking buyers for parts of their business are not getting good offers from other firms, or from private equity". For example, Foster's Group, an Australian beverage company, was prepared to sell its wine business. However, due to the lack of a decent offer, it decided to spin off the wine business, which is now called Treasury Wine Estates.

=== Conglomerate discount ===
According to The Economist, another driving force of the proliferation of spin-offs is what it calls the "conglomerate discount" — that "stockmarkets value a diversified group at less than the sum of its parts".

== Examples ==
Some examples of spin-offs (according to the SEC definition):

- MGM Grand spun off from Metro-Goldwyn-Mayer in 1986. In turn, Metro-Goldwyn-Mayer was acquired by Amazon in 2021. In 2023, Metro-Goldwyn-Mayer merged with Amazon Studios to form Amazon MGM Studios.
- Guidant was spun off from Eli Lilly and Company in 1994, formed from Lilly's Medical Devices and Diagnostics Division.
- Agilent Technologies spun off from Hewlett-Packard (HP) in 1999, formed from HP's former test-and-measurement equipment division. Later in 2014, Keysight was spun off from Agilent Technologies.
- Expedia Group was spun off from Microsoft in 1999, with its eponymous subsidiary Expedia.
- DreamWorks Animation was spun off from DreamWorks Pictures in 2004. In turn, DreamWorks Animation was acquired by Comcast subsidiary NBCUniversal in 2016.
- Covidien was spun off from Tyco International in 2007.
- TE Connectivity was spun off from Tyco International in 2007.
- Cenovus Energy was spun off from Encana (now Ovintiv) in 2009.
- AOL was a Time Warner spin-off in 2009; this effectively was a demerger, as AOL had previously merged into Time Warner.
- Ram Trucks was spun off from Dodge in 2010.
- Ocean Rig was spun off from DryShips in September 2011.
- News Corporation's publishing operations (and its broadcasting operations in Australia) were spun off as News Corp in 2013. The previous News Corporation's remaining media properties were retained under the name 21st Century Fox. In turn, 21st Century Fox was acquired by The Walt Disney Company in 2019, but its broadcast, news, and national sports assets were spun off to the new Fox Corporation, while Disney retained the film, television, and cable production units.
- After being acquired by Sega, Index Corporation's video game operations were re-branded as Atlus, the name of a predecessor company, while its contents and solution businesses were spun off as a new company using the Index Corporation name in 2013.
- Mallinckrodt Pharmaceuticals was spun off from Covidien in 2013.
- Tegna was spun off from Gannett in 2015.
- In 2015 Hewlett Packard Enterprise was spun off from Hewlett-Packard.
- Viacom was spun off from CBS in 1971, but was later re-merged in 2019 as ViacomCBS, now Paramount Global, which later merged with Skydance Media in 2025 to form Paramount Skydance.
- Fortive, Envista and Veralto were spun off from Danaher in 2016, 2019 and 2023 respectively.
- In South Korea, the then-CJ E&M (now CJ ENM Entertainment Division) spun off its drama production and distribution division into a new subsidiary company called Studio Dragon in May 2016.
- In 2023 and 2024 General Electric was split into three separate companies GE Aerospace (which become GE successor company) GE Vernova (spun off in 2024) and GE HealthCare (spun out in 2023).
- Lionsgate Studios was spun off from Starz Entertainment in 2024.
- Versant was spun off from NBCUniversal in 2026.
- In 2026 FedEx spun off its Less-than-truckload shipping division FedEx Freight into a separately traded company
- 33 companies were spun off from Standard Oil of New Jersey as the result of a 1911 anti-trust Supreme Court Decision.

Examples following the second definition of spin-out:

- Fairchild Semiconductor was a spin-out of Shockley Transistor; the founders were Shockley's "traitorous eight"
- Intel was, in turn, a spin-out of Fairchild, as were many firms in the semiconductor industry

=== Academia ===
An example of companies created by technology transfer or licensing:

- Since 1997, Oxford University Innovation has helped create more than 70 spin-out companies, and now, on average, every two months a new company is spun out of "academic research generated within and owned by the University of Oxford". Over £266 million in external investment has been raised by spin-out companies since 2000, and five are currently listed on the London Stock Exchange's Alternative Investment Market.

== See also ==
- Demerger
- Divestment
- Equity carve-out
- Stub (stock)
- Successor company
