= Gabriella Crespi =

Italian artist and designer

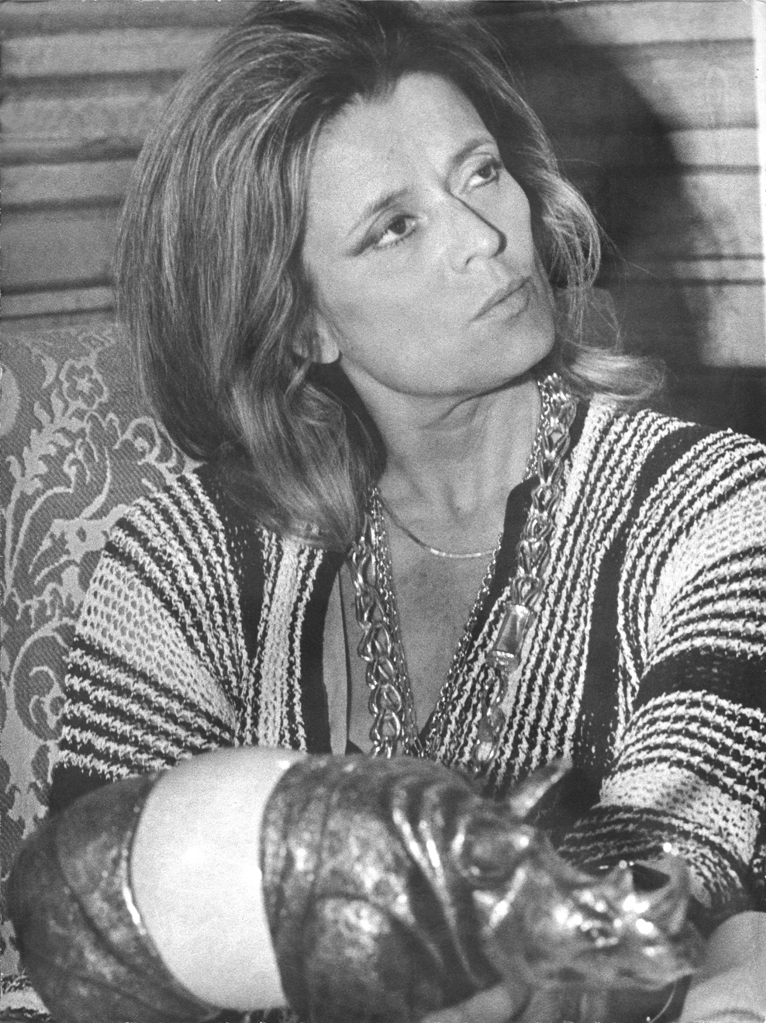
- Gabriella Crespi in 1970
- Born: 17 February 1922; Saronno, Italy
- Died: 14 February 2017 (aged 94); Milan, Italy
- Education: Accademia di Belle Arti, Milan; Polytechnic University, Milan
- Known for: Sculpture, furniture design, jewelry design
- Notable work: Obelisk (1968-1970) Lune (1969-1980); Kaleidoscope (1970-1976); The Plurimi series (1970-1982); Animali (1970-1974); Fungo Lamp (1970-1976); Z Line (1972-1974); The Rising Sun Collection (1973-1975); Nympheas (1975-1979) New Bronze Age (2015-2017)
- Spouse: Giuseppe Maria Crespi (m.1948-1974)
- Children: 2

Gabriella Crespi (17 February 1922 – 14 February 2017) was an Italian artist-designer whose work spanned furniture design, jewelry and sculpture.

Transforming objects by adding changes in their function, Crespi developed her style with a repertoire of more than two thousand pieces. Her work methods recall those of Renaissance workshops, bringing craftsmanship and artistic approach together.

Her design pieces have been appreciated and owned by public figures as King Faisal, the Shah Reza Pahlavi, Grace Kelly, George Livanos, Thomas Hoving, Audrey Hepburn, Gunter Sachs and celebrated by design enthusiasts and magazines.

== Career ==
At the end of the 1950s, Gabriella Crespi commenced her activity as a designer and presented her first collections in Milan. Mrs. Hoving, owner of Tiffany & Co. and Bonwit Teller at that time, owned her first works and, from the early 1960s, her objects were commissioned by Dior for the gifts department, home decor and dining: the ties between Crespi and Dior will last for almost twenty years.

Between the 1970s and the 1980s, Gabriella Crespi gained an elite place among the 20th century furniture designers with her "Plurimi" series (1970-1982), the "Z Line" (1972-1974) and other pieces, such as "Obelisk" (1968-1970), "Moons" (1969-1980) and "Kaleidoscope" (1970-1976).

Crespi retired in 1987 and, at the age of 65, she ventured into the Himalayas where she lived for two decades. She published a book in 2007, "Ricerca di Infinito Himalaya", after the retreat.

In 2011 a retrospective exhibition of her work, Gabriella Crespi: The Sign and the Spirit, was held in Milan at Palazzo Reale.

In 2015 Crespi presents in the Rita Fancsaly Gallery "New Bronze Age," a series of new limited editions of her most iconic works: "Ellisse table", "Dama table", "Yang Yin", "Z Desk", including a new version of her "Puzzle Table", in just two versions: red and blu, whose countertop is made of Murano glass tiles, unique pieces conceived and designed by the architect Franco Deboni, internationally renowned for his glass creations. In 2016 Gabriella Crespi realized her last work “Wave Desk”, single piece. In 2019, Crespi's daughter Elisabetta Crespi, put the Fungo lamp from The Rising Sun Collection back into production with the original craftspeople. The original mushroom-like Fungo lamps were made with bamboo shades, and then later Plexiglas shades. A number of reissued pieces were featured in an installation at Dimore Gallery during Milan Design Week in 2019 including brass Tavolo Scultura tables, Fungo lamps in plexiglass, Cubo Tondo tables, an Eclipse table, and a Scudo sconce. The installation featured pink and tan sand around the furniture.

== Bibliography ==
- Triennale Design Museum. Il Design Italiano. Milano: Electa, 2018. ISBN 9788891819819
- Masini, Pierluigi (2018). Gabriella Crespi Spirito e Materia, Arte e Design. Milano: Odoya, 2018. ISBN 9788862884327
- Triennale Design Museum 9. W.Women in Italian Design. Mantova: Corraini Edizioni, 2016. ISBN 9788875705671
- Favardin, Patrick et Bloch-Champfort, Guy. Les Décorateurs des années 60-70. Paris: Norma Editions, 2015. ISBN 9782915542776
- 1968 Italian Radical Design. Athens: Deste Foundation for Contemporary Art, 2014. ISBN 9786185039042
- Bony, Anne. Gabriella Crespi. Paris: Piasa Editions, 2014
- Stoeltie, Barbara & René. Parisian Interiors. Paris: Editions Flammarion, 2011. ISBN 9782080301727
- Cunaccia,Cesare. Gabriella Crespi The Sign and the Spirit. Milano: Mondadori Electa, 2011. ISBN 9788837086183
- Derieux Matos, Debra. Living in Style Paris. Paris: teNeues Publishing Group, 2010. ISBN 9783832793715
- Crespi, Gabriella. Ricerca di Infinito Himalaya. Cisternino, Herakhandi Samaj Italiano, 2007.
- Bony, Anne. Meubles et décors des années 70. Paris: Editions du Regard, 2005. ISBN 9782841051755
