= Metaxata =

Metaxata Μεταξάτα
- Community
- Location within Greece
- Coordinates: 38°7′N 20°32′E
- Country: Greece
- Administrative region: Ionian Islands
- Regional unit: Kefalonia
- Municipality: Argostoli
- Municipal unit: Leivatho

Population (2021)
  - Community: 439
- Time zone: UTC+2 (EET)
  - Summer (DST): UTC+3 (EEST)
- Vehicle registration: KE

Metaxata (Greek: Μεταξάτα) is a village in the southern part of the island of Kefalonia, Greece. It is part of the municipal unit of Leivatho. It is situated in low hills, near the Ionian Sea coast. It is 2 km west of Kerameies, 2 km northeast of Svoronata, 2 km southwest of Peratata and 8 km southeast of Argostoli.

== History ==
Metaxata was founded by the Byzantine Markantonios Metaxas who settled in an area then known as Frantzata (Φρατζάτα) after the fall of Constantinople in 1453. The village is the home town of the revolutionists Andreas and Konstantinos Metaxas who had the power of Kefalonia and participated in the Greek War of Independence in the Peloponnese in the 1820s. In 1823, Lord Byron lived in Metaxata for four months and wrote some poems about the area and its beauties. Today in the central square, there is a statue in remembrance of Lord Byron and right next to it, the traveller can see the site of the house where the great poet lived. The house has a plaque stating that it is built on the site of the house that Byron lived in. Metaxata was severely damaged by the 1953 Ionian earthquake.

== Population ==
Year	Population
1981	367
1991	357
2001	493
2011	504
2021	439

== See also ==
- List of settlements in Cephalonia
