= Peter Livanos =

Greek shipping tycoon

Peter G. Livanos
- Πέτρος Λιβανός
- Born: 1958 (age 67–68); Athens, Greece
- Education: Columbia University
- Occupation: shipping businessman
- Years active: 1982–
- Board member of: Owner of Ceres Hellenic Shipping Enterprises; Shareholder of Aston Martin

Peter G. Livanos (born 1958), is a Greek shipping tycoon. He owns the Greek shipping company Ceres Hellenic, and was involved in the restructuring of the shipping company into the group Ceres Hellenic.

Livanos lives with his family at Lake Geneva, Athens and London. He controls 100% of Ceres Hellenic Shipping, the largest Greek fleet, in terms of tonnage, and a smaller ferry line of Russian-made hydrofoils that serve the Greek Islands.

Livanos is a graduate of The Buckley School in New York, Le Rosey in Switzerland and Columbia University in New York, from which he graduated with a B.S. degree in 1981. He is known for his yachting and was awarded an Honorary Doctorate of Science by the Massachusetts Maritime Academy. He was also a majority shareholder of the car manufacturer Aston Martin.

According to the Bloomberg Billionaire Index, his net worth is estimated at $1.7 billion in 2015 and he has been ranked among the wealthiest Greeks.

He is the son of the shipping magnate George P. Livanos, who built up Greece’s largest merchant fleet in the 1980s and 1990s. His maternal grandfather is the Greek businessman Yiannis Carras, and he is a distant relative of Stavros G. Livanos by his father's side.
