= Vlachata =

Vlachata Βλαχάτα
- Community
- Location within Greece
- Coordinates: 38°7.4′N 20°37.5′E
- Country: Greece
- Administrative region: Ionian Islands
- Regional unit: Kefalonia
- Municipality: Argostoli
- Municipal unit: Leivatho
- Elevation: 200 m (660 ft)

Population (2021)
  - Community: 799
- Time zone: UTC+2 (EET)
  - Summer (DST): UTC+3 (EEST)
- Postal code: 281 00
- Area code: 26710
- Vehicle registration: KE

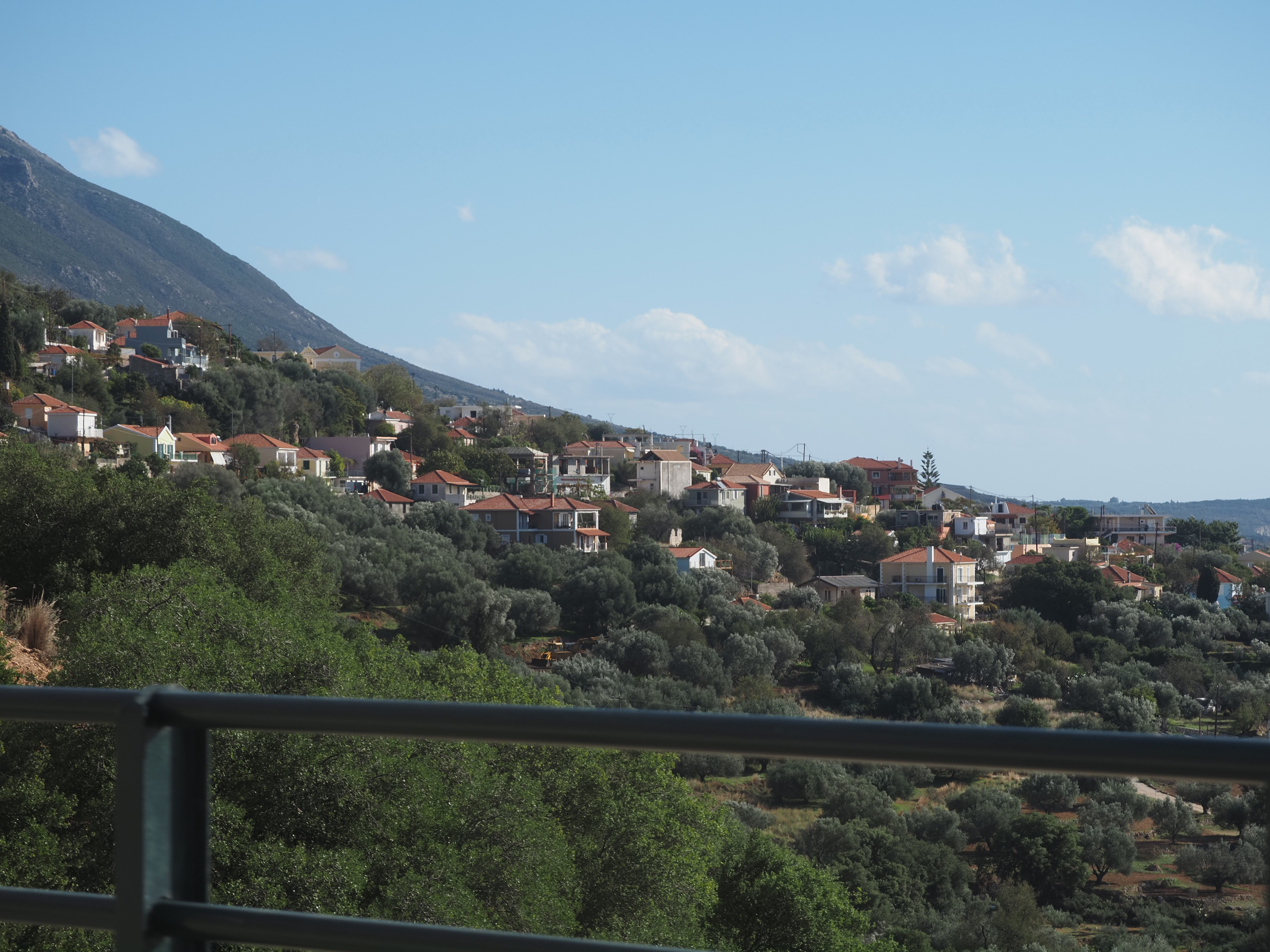

Vlachata (Greek: Βλαχάτα, also Βλαχάτα Εικοσιμίας) is a village and a community in the eastern part of the municipal unit of Leivatho near the south coast of the island of Kefalonia, Greece. To avoid confusion with another Vlachata near Sami, it is also known as Vlachata Eikosimias. The community consists of the villages Vlachata and Simotata, which is 2 km east of Vlachata. Vlachata is situated on a mountain slope above the Ionian Sea coast, at about 200 m elevation. Mount Ainos, the highest point of Cephalonia, is 4 km to the northeast. Vlachata is 1 km northwest of Lourdata, 2 km southeast of Mousata, 13 km southwest of Poros and 13 km southeast of Argostoli. The road from Argostoli to Poros runs through Vlachata. Vlachata suffered great damage from the 1953 Ionian earthquake.

== Historical population ==
Year	Village population	Community population
1981	589	-
1991	520	-
2001	578	-
2011	699	853
2021	652	799

== See also ==
- List of settlements in Cephalonia
