= Mousata =

Mousata Μουσάτα
- Community
- Location within Greece
- Coordinates: 38°7.8′N 20°36.4′E
- Country: Greece
- Administrative region: Ionian Islands
- Regional unit: Kefalonia
- Municipality: Argostoli
- Municipal unit: Leivatho

Population (2021)
  - Community: 335
- Time zone: UTC+2 (EET)
  - Summer (DST): UTC+3 (EEST)
- Postal code: 280 82
- Area code: 26710
- Vehicle registration: KE

Mousata (Greek: Μουσάτα) is a village in the municipal unit of Leivatho on the island of Cephalonia, Greece. It is situated between Mount Ainos and the Ionian Sea, at about 200 m (660 ft) elevation. It is 2 km northwest of Vlachata, 4 km east of Peratata and 12 km southeast of Argostoli. The road from Poros to Argostoli passes through the village. Mousata suffered great damage from the 1953 Ionian earthquake.

== Historical population ==
Historical populations for Mousata
Year	Pop.	±%
1981	190	—
1991	202	+6.3%
2001	197	−2.5%
2011	318	+61.4%
2021	335	+5.3%

== See also ==
- List of settlements in Cephalonia
