= EXM =

EXM may refer to:

- Entesa per Mallorca, a defunct Spanish political party
- Excel Maritime, an American shipping company
- Exmouth railway station, in England
- Expansion microscopy
