= Greeks of the Sea =

- Genre: Documentary
- Created by: Peter Pentz
- Written by: Tom Nicol (Chief), Nikos Andronicos (Additional)
- Screenplay by: Peter Pentz, Tom Nicol and Phil Kiely
- Directed by: Tom Nicol
- Starring: Nikos Andronicos
- Narrated by: Nikos Andronicos
- Theme music composer: Joe Kiely
- Country of origin: Australia
- Original language: English
- No. of episodes: Australian Version - 3 International Version - 6

Production
- Cinematography: Joe Kiely (Chief), Tim Seller (Assistant)
- Editor: Joe Kiely
- Running time: Australian Version - 1 hour per episode, International Version - 30 minutes per episode
- Production companies: Tadpole Studios, Greek Seadogs

Original release
- Network: SBS ONE
- Release: 21 July – 2 August 2014

Greeks of the Sea is a documentary which was screened on SBS ONE in Australia from 19 July to 2 August 2014 as a three one-hour episode series. The documentary was filmed in the Greek Islands in 2013. The TV documentary series is about the Greek's relationship with the sea. It is presented by Greek-Australian filmmaker Nikos Andronicos, who travelled from mainland Greece to 15 Islands of the Aegean Sea to hear the stories of fishermen, boat builders, divers, naval officers, ship-owners and others, whom he meets.

The series covers the maritime prowess of the Greeks. The series is also available in an international version of six half-hour episodes as listed in the Episode guide.

== Production ==
Greeks of the Sea was produced by an all Australian team. The Australian version is a series consisting of three one-hour episodes, produced especially for and in association with SBS Australia. The international version is a series of six 30 minute episodes. The series was originally devised and filmed under the working title of Greek Seadogs. It was produced by Greek Seadogs & Tadpole Studios in association with SBS Australia in 2014.

== Episodes ==
No.	Islands visited	Original release date
1	Kythera, Salamis	TBA
Andronicos meets his mentor, Captain T. "Makis" Daskalkis, in Syntagma Square, Athens. Capt. Deskalkis is a retired Chief Pilot of the Port of Piraeus. Nikos travels to Kythera where his great, great grandfather was a fisherman. On the island of Salamis, he meets Professor T. Tassios at the scene of the Battle of Salamis.
2	Syros, Paros	TBA
Andronicos journeys on a Greek ferry and interviews the crew. Arriving at the geographically strategic island of Syros, he talks to the Port Police, before visiting Neorion shipyards. Travelling on to Paros he encounters one of the island’s fisherman who was involved with the Express Samina ferry disaster in 2000.
3	Naxos, Ios, Amorgos	TBA
Andonicos meets the harbour master of Naxos, before joining Con Makris on a private super yacht. He attempts windsurfing after which he joins tourists brought to the island of Ios by the ferries. On Amorgos, he joins a scuba dive and hears of the mariners' spiritual connection to the sea at the Monastery of Panagia Hozoviotissa.
4	Fournoi, Samos	TBA
Andronicos is welcomed by a fishing family on the island complex of Fournoi. He sees first-hand the results of over-fishing in The Aegean and interviews the captain of a fishing trawler. Boat builders on Samos tell him of their struggles before he takes a day-cruise along the Southern coast the island on a caïque.
5	Chios, Oinousses, Agathonisi	TBA
Travelling from Chios to Oinousses, Andronicos meets Mr E. Angelakos (the Mayor of Oinousses), and hears about Greece's merchant navy from a ship-owners point of view. On board a Coastal Patrol boat off the island of Agathonisi, he learns of their encounters whilst on patrol.
6	Marathi, Kalymnos, Patmos	TBA
Andronicos takes the helm of a 50 ft sailing yacht to the small island of Marathi, off Arkoi. On Kalymnos he meets sponge divers. Whilst travelling back to Athens as a passenger on the Star Clipper, he visits the cave on the island of Patmos, where it is believed Saint John the Theologian wrote the Book of Revelation. At the Temple of Poseidon, he reflects on his journey with his mentor Daskalkis.
