= Svoronata =

Svoronata Σβορωνάτα
- Community
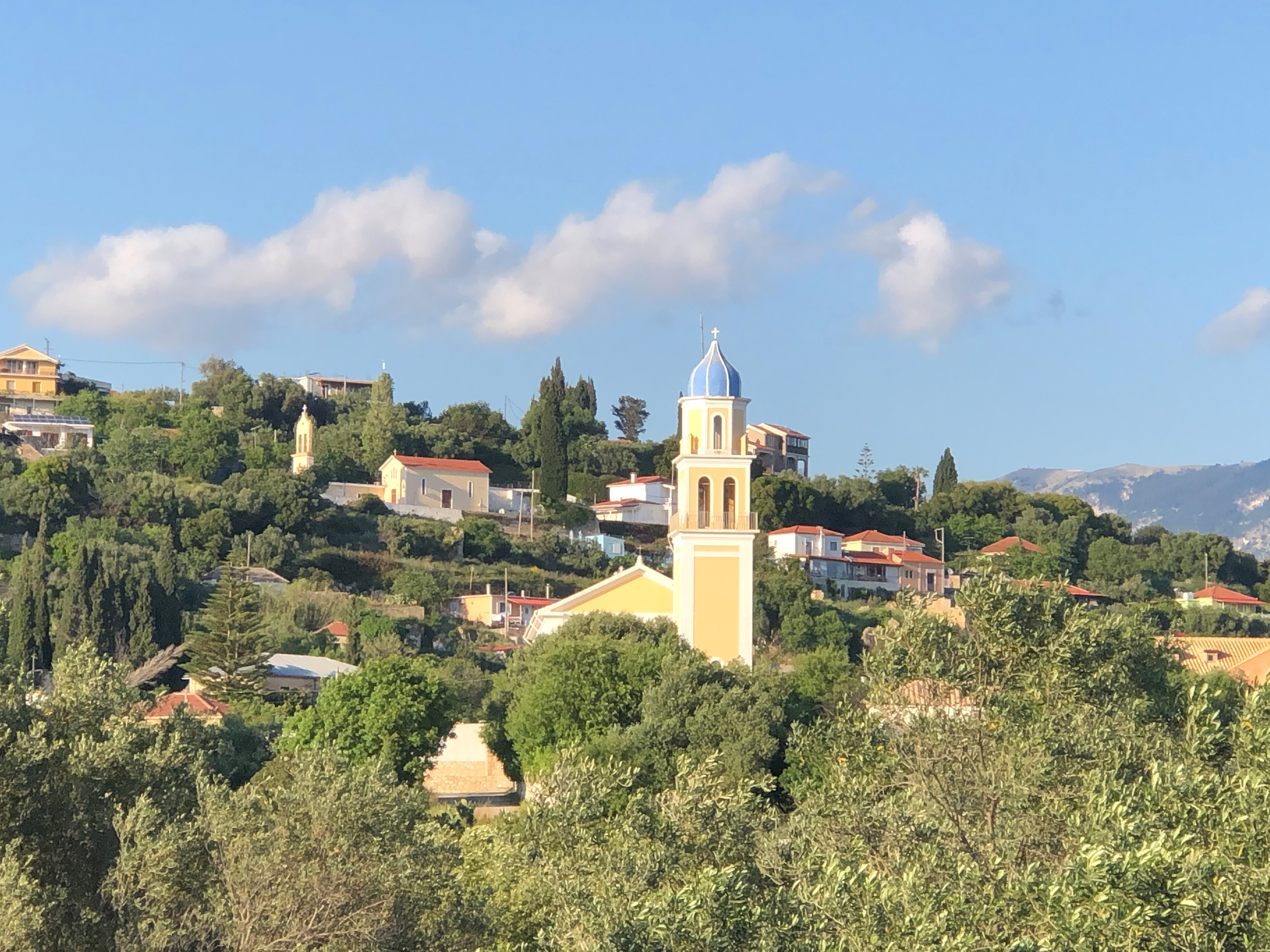
- View at Agios Nikolaos church, Svoronata

- Location within Greece
- Coordinates: 38.1165622°N 20.5157502°E
- Country: Greece
- Administrative region: Ionian Islands
- Regional unit: Kefalonia
- Municipality: Argostoli
- Municipal unit: Leivatho

Population (2021)
  - Community: 694
- Time zone: UTC+2 (EET)
  - Summer (DST): UTC+3 (EEST)

Svoronata (Greek: Σβορωνάτα) is a village in the municipal unit Leivatho, southern Cephalonia, Greece. It is situated on a hillside near the Ionian Sea coast. It is 2 km west of Metaxata, 2 km east of the Cephalonia International Airport and 7 km southeast of Argostoli.

== See also ==
- List of settlements in Cephalonia
