= Kerameies =

Kerameies Κεραμειές
- Community
- Location within Greece
- Coordinates: 38°7′N 20°33′E
- Country: Greece
- Administrative region: Ionian Islands
- Regional unit: Kefalonia
- Municipality: Argostoli
- Municipal unit: Leivatho

Population (2021)
  - Community: 380
- Time zone: UTC+2 (EET)
  - Summer (DST): UTC+3 (EEST)
- Vehicle registration: KE

Kerameies (Greek: Κεραμειές, also Κεραμιές - Keramies) is a local community located in the southern part of the island of Kefalonia. It was the seat of the municipality of Leivatho. In the village is the largest school in the area, from kindergarten to high school named "Vallianio Likio Keramion" (http://lyk-keram.kef.sch.gr). It is situated in low hills, at about 140 m elevation. Kerameies is 2 km south of Peratata, 2 km east of Metaxata and 9 km southeast of Argostoli. The village was home to two families of merchants and shipowners, Lykiardopoulos and Vallianos. The Vallianos family is considered a great benefactor of Greece as a result of their donations made to the country, and particularly for the funding of the building of the National Library of Greece in Athens (1888–1903). The village as well as almost the entire island (excluding the Fiskardo area) was struck by the 1953 Ionian earthquake that shook and destroyed every building in the village.

== Population ==
Year	Population
1981	141
1991	202
2001	379
2011	334
2021	380

== Notable people ==
- Panayis Athanase Vagliano (1814–1902) merchant and shipowner

== See also ==
- List of settlements in Cephalonia
