= Leivatho =

Leivatho Λειβαθώ
- Municipal unit
- Location within the regional unit

- Location within Greece
- Coordinates: 38°08′N 20°36′E
- Country: Greece
- Administrative region: Ionian Islands
- Regional unit: Kefalonia
- Municipality: Argostoli

Area
  - Municipal unit: 62.6 km^{2} (24.2 sq mi)

Population (2021)
  - Municipal unit: 5,765
  - Municipal unit density: 92.1/km^{2} (239/sq mi)
- Time zone: UTC+2 (EET)
  - Summer (DST): UTC+3 (EEST)
- Vehicle registration: ΚΕ

Leivatho (Greek: Λειβαθώ) is a former municipality on the island of Kefalonia, Ionian Islands, Greece. Since the 2019 local government reform it is part of the municipality Argostoli, of which it is a municipal unit. It lies south of Argostoli, on the central south coast of the island, and has a land area of 62.626 km² and a population of 5,765 (2021 census).

== Subdivisions ==
The municipal unit Leivatho is subdivided into the following communities (constituent villages in brackets):

- Kerameies (seat of the former municipality)
- Karavados
- Lakithra (Lakithra, Menegata)
- Lourdata
- Metaxata
- Mousata
- Peratata (Peratata, Kastro)
- Pesada (Pesada, Dorizata, Kountourata)
- Spartia (Spartia, Kleismata, Korianna)
- Svoronata
- Vlachata (Vlachata, Simotata)

== See also ==
- List of settlements in Cephalonia
