= Greek shipping =

Greek tradition of aquatic shipping

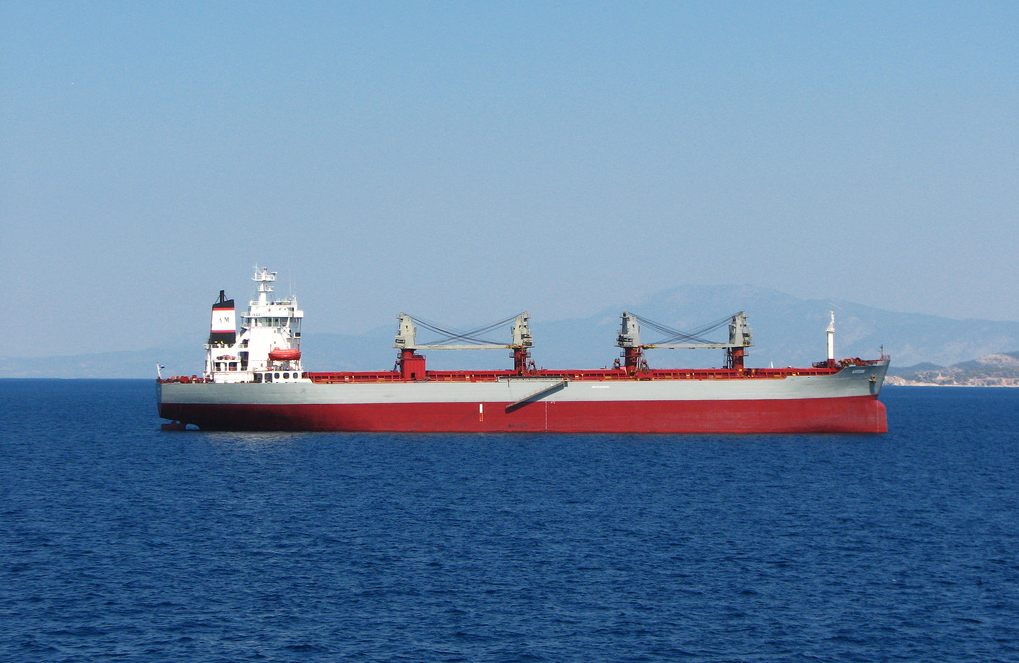
Greek companies control 21% (2022) of the world's total merchant fleet, making it the largest in the world. They are ranked in the top 5 for all kinds of ships, including first for tankers and bulk carriers.

Greece is a maritime nation by tradition, as shipping is arguably the oldest form of occupation of the Greeks and has been a key element of Greek economic activity since ancient times. Today, shipping is the country's most important industry worth $21.9 billion in 2018. If related businesses are added, the figure jumps to $23.7 billion, employs about 392,000 people (14% of the workforce), and shipping receipts are about 1/3 of the nation's trade deficit. In 2018, the Greek Merchant Navy controlled the world's largest merchant fleet, in terms of tonnage and shipping force, with a total DWT of 834,649,089 tons and a fleet of 5,626 Greek-owned vessels, according to Lloyd's List. Greece is also ranked in the top for all kinds of ships, including first for tankers and bulk carriers.

Many Greek shipping companies have their headquarters located either in Athens or London and New York City, and are run by Greek traditional shipping families which are notable for their great wealth and influence in the international maritime industry. The 7th Secretary General (2003-2011) of the International Maritime Organization was Efthymios Mitropoulos.

== Historic background ==
The Greeks have been a maritime nation since antiquity, as the mountainous landscape of the mainland, and the limited farming area and the extended coastline of Greece led people to shipping. The geographical position of the region on the crossroads of ancient sea lanes in the eastern Mediterranean, the multiplicity of islands and the proximity to other advanced civilizations helped shape the maritime nature of the Greek nation at an early stage. In Greece and the wider Aegean, international trade existed from the Minoan and Mycenean times in the Bronze Age. The presence of goods such as pottery, gold, copper objects far away from their area of provenance attests to this wide-ranging network of shipping transport and trade that existed between the Greek mainland and the Greek islands . The Greeks soon came to dominate the maritime trade in the region, gradually expanding it along the shores of the Mediterranean to Egypt, Phoenicia, Asia Minor, the Black Sea, and establishing colonies. The prowess of the ancient Greek navy was primarily displayed in naval battles during the Persian wars, the Delian League era and the Peloponnesian war. In the following centuries, a large part of the sea trade of the Roman Empire was carried out by the Greeks, while they continued to be involved and play a major role in shipping during the era of the Byzantine Empire as well.

== Ottoman era and later ==
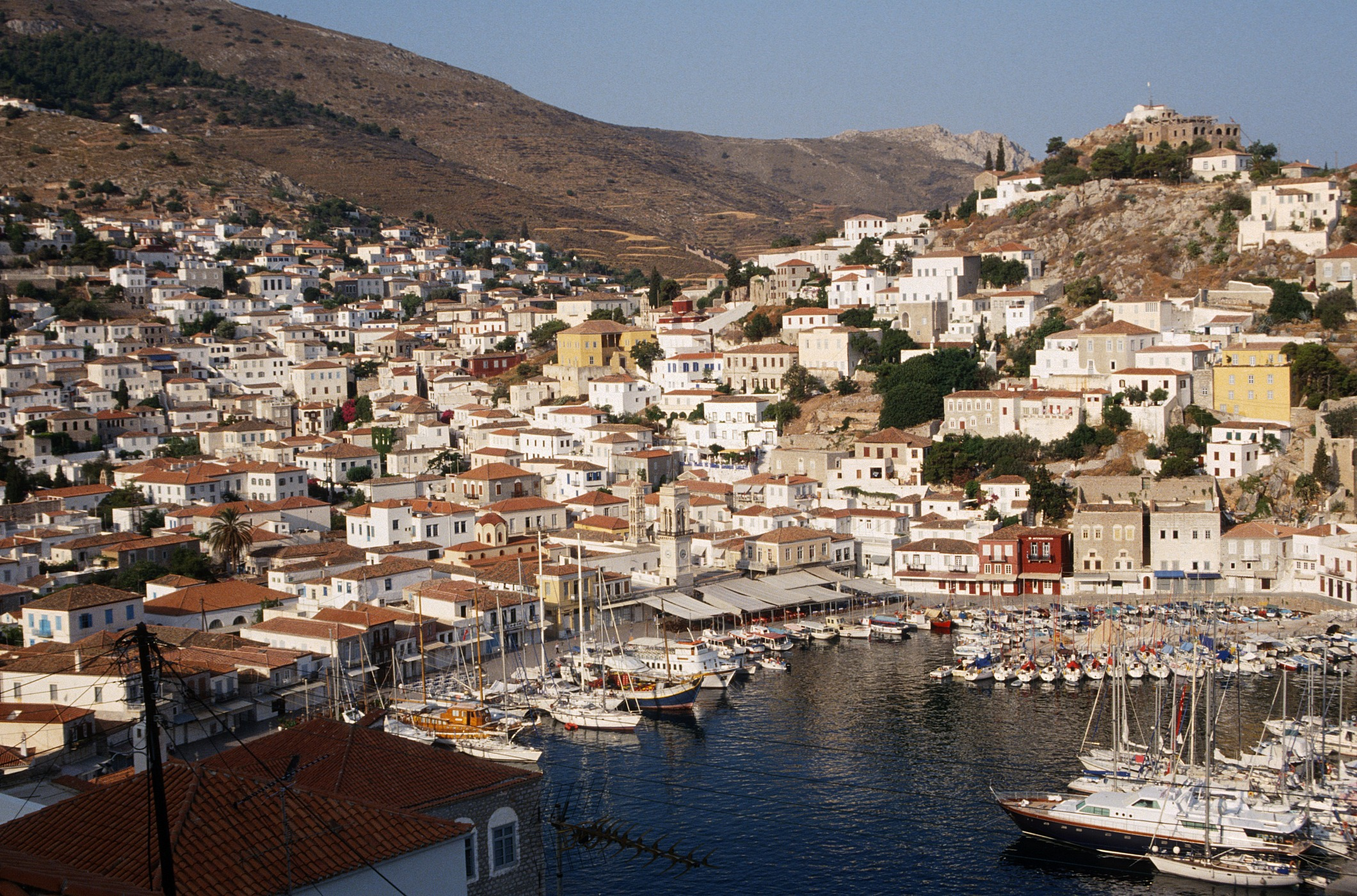
View of Hydra (island)

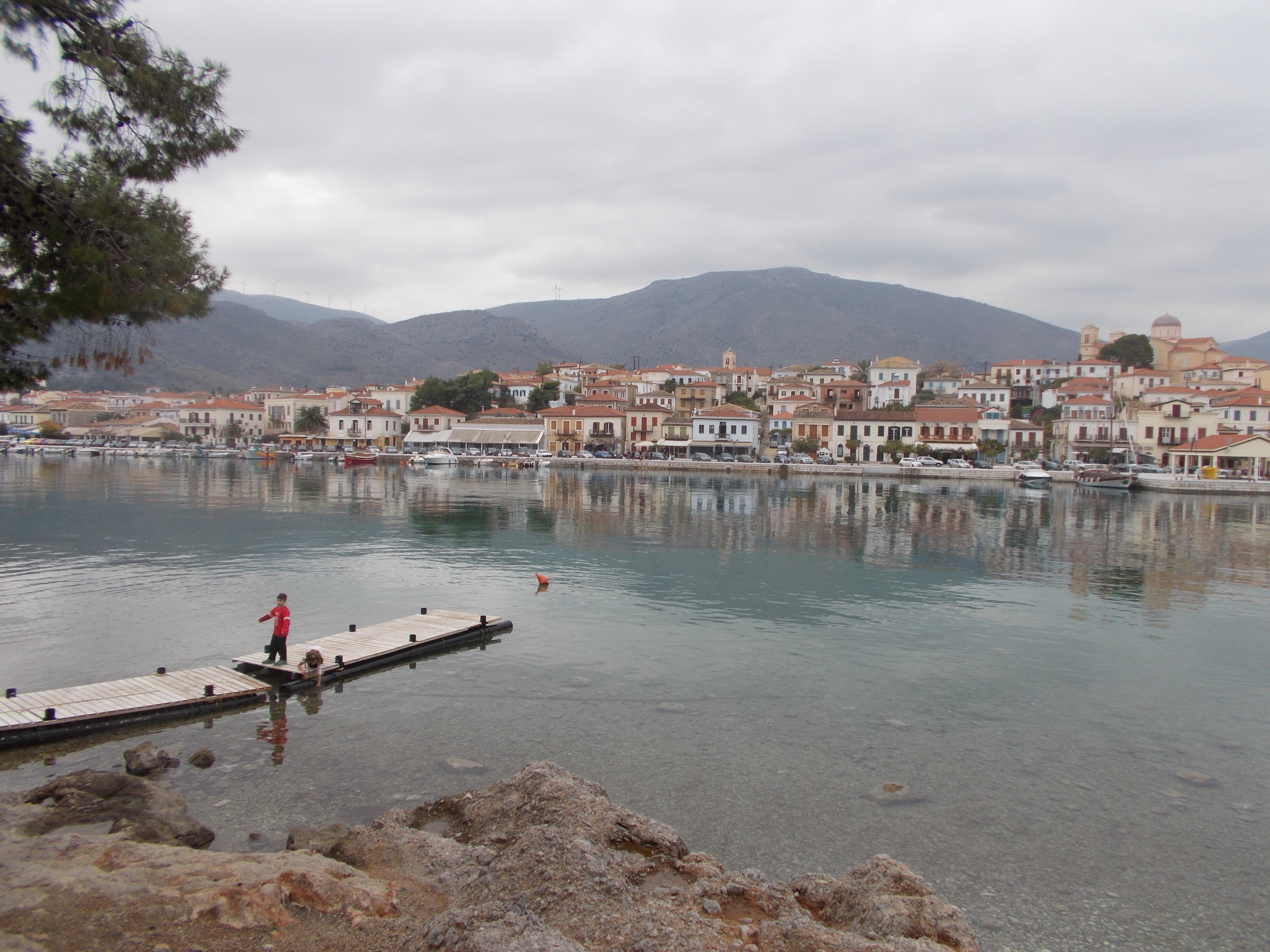
The port of Galaxidi

In Ottoman era, the involvement of the Greeks in international maritime commerce was also prominent and Greek ships could be found especially in the ports of the eastern Mediterranean. They expanded their shipping activities and trade towards western Europe in the 16th century, taking advantage from the rapidly increasing need for grain. The restrictions imposed by the Ottomans to regulate the grain trade did not prevent the Greeks from carrying out illicit trade which brought considerable fortunes to them. Later, the Greek maritime merchants increased their influence, as they supplied the Balkans with raw materials, handled goods on behalf of foreigners, distributed the goods to the final markets and controlled the sea trade in the region, assuming the role of shipping agents. During the 18th century, the consolidation of political and economic power at the hands of the Phanariotes in Constantinople helped further expansion of the Greek maritime activity into the rest of Europe. The Greek merchant marine was also able to displace the western maritime powers due to the Anglo-French wars, which led their commerce to decline, and the navigation of the Greek vessels under the protection of the Russian Empire in many occasions (after the Treaty of Küçük Kaynarca).

The most prominent of the Greek cities that emerged as maritime powers were those from western Greece, primarily Galaxidi and Missolonghi, but also Arta, Preveza, Paxi and Corfu, due to their early commercial ties with the Italian cities. In addition, the Aegean Islands were heavily active in shipping, where traditionally the inhabitants occupied with maritime commerce, especially Hydra, Spetses, Andros, Syros, Chios, Kasos, Psara and Mykonos. Although they did not have their own national flag, they flew the flags of the Russian and the British Empire for international routes. In 1792, the first Greek insurance company was founded in Trieste and those of Odessa followed in 1808 and 1814. Gradually, Greek seafarers made a lot of money and gained further knowledge and experience as they had to refine their ships and themselves in warfare against pirates. The growth of the Greek merchant fleet gave confidence and success to them, while their contact with the western peoples awakened their national consciousness and made them feel free. The existence of a reservoir of trained sailors was to be proven an inestimable advantage once the Greek War of Independence had broken out, when the Greek merchant fleet converted to a formidable martial weapon against the cumbersome ships of the Ottoman fleet.

=== Post-Napoleonic and Wars of Independence ===
Greek merchants also provided the material basis for the Neohellenic Diafotismos. Impelled by the sense of local patriotism that had always been strong in the Greek world, they endowed schools and libraries. The three most important schools-cum-colleges in the Greek world on the eve of the War of Independence were situated in Smyrna, Chios, and Ayvalık (on the coast of Asia Minor opposite the island of Lesbos), all three major centres of Greek commerce.

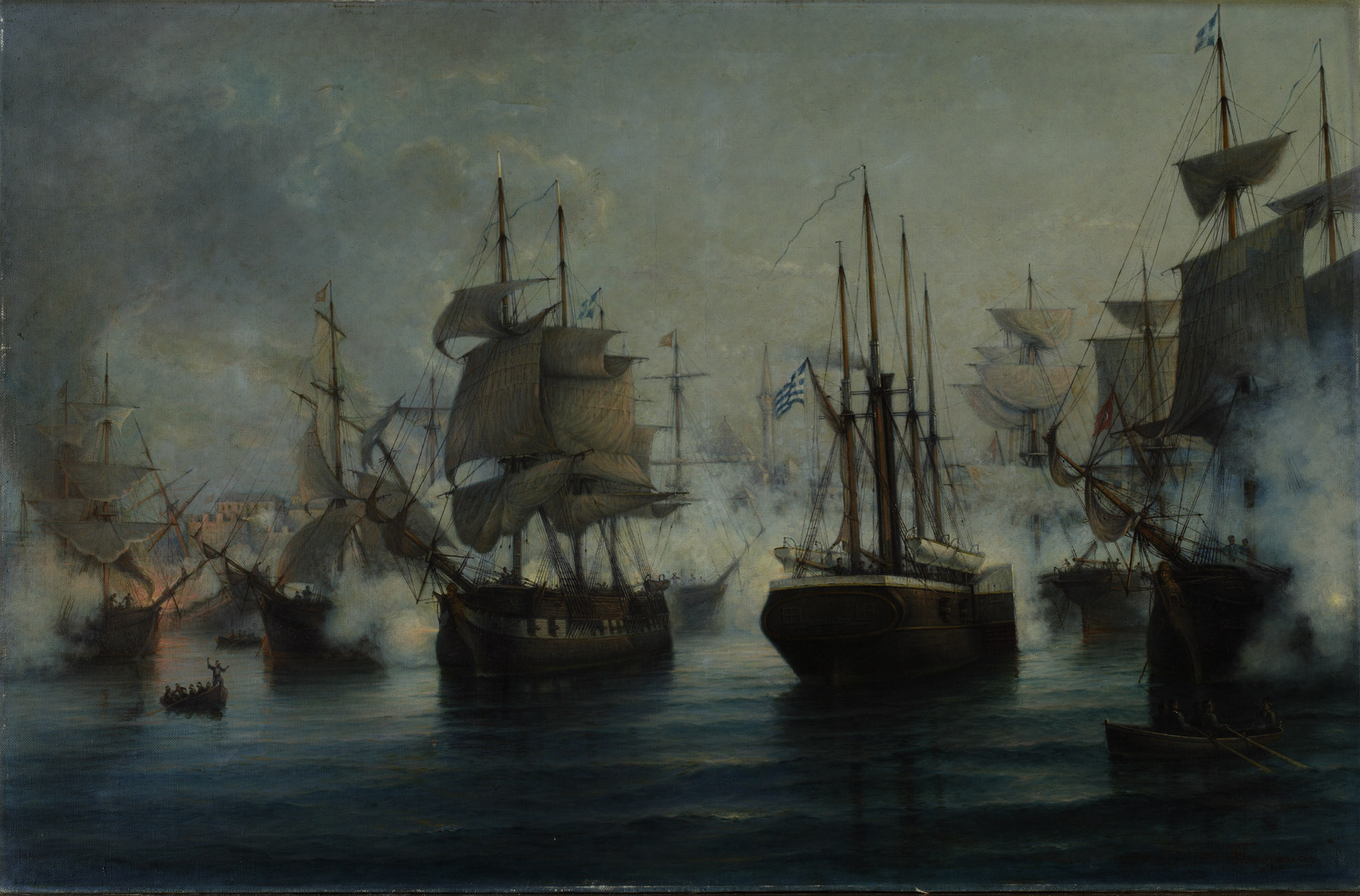
The Greek fleet in the Battle of Itea by Yiannis Poulakas

In the wake of the nineteenth century diaspora the Chiot families were well positioned to take advantage of the commercial opportunities across Europe after the Napoleonic Wars. Families such as the Rallis were already established in Marseille and London. They established a network of shipping specialists across all of the major ports in Europe, Asia and the Americas. Gaining a seat on the Baltic Exchange, Ralli brothers were able to introduce shippers and agents to reliable sources of funding and through Lloyd's of London, to reliable insurance. Uniquely, this enabled them finance their fleets with the ships acting as security, a practice that was illegal in Greece. In some parts of the world these fleets were Greek-owned, but in Britain they were almost exclusively chartered by London Greeks flying under the British Flag. The major shipping companies were then owned by Papayanni, Spartali and Schilizzi, while the Rodocanachi family became pre-eminent traders in their cargoes.

Accompanying these Greek-run fleets were local expatriate communities of workmen and agent-translators who managed the unfamiliar customs and bureaucracy in foreign ports. In these times before the telegraph, this network gave the Greek shippers advance warning of events and allowed them to control news and prices in advance of their competitors.

The financial crisis of the 1860s saw some of these businesses collapse. Nonetheless, the tradition of endowment continued, and it was shipping that funded various institutions, such as the National Library of Greece. These changes heralded a move by some of the Chios families out of shipping and into financing or broking, allowing Ionian-descended families to establish their own networks and shipping dynasties, most notably the Vaglianos, Ziffa and Sechiari, with funding routed from the London financial markets.

These changes heralded a move by some of the Chios families out of shipping and into financing or broking, allowing Ionian-descended families to establish their own networks and shipping dynasties, most notably the Vaglianos, Ziffa and Sechiari, with funding routed from the London financial markets.

== Twentieth century ==
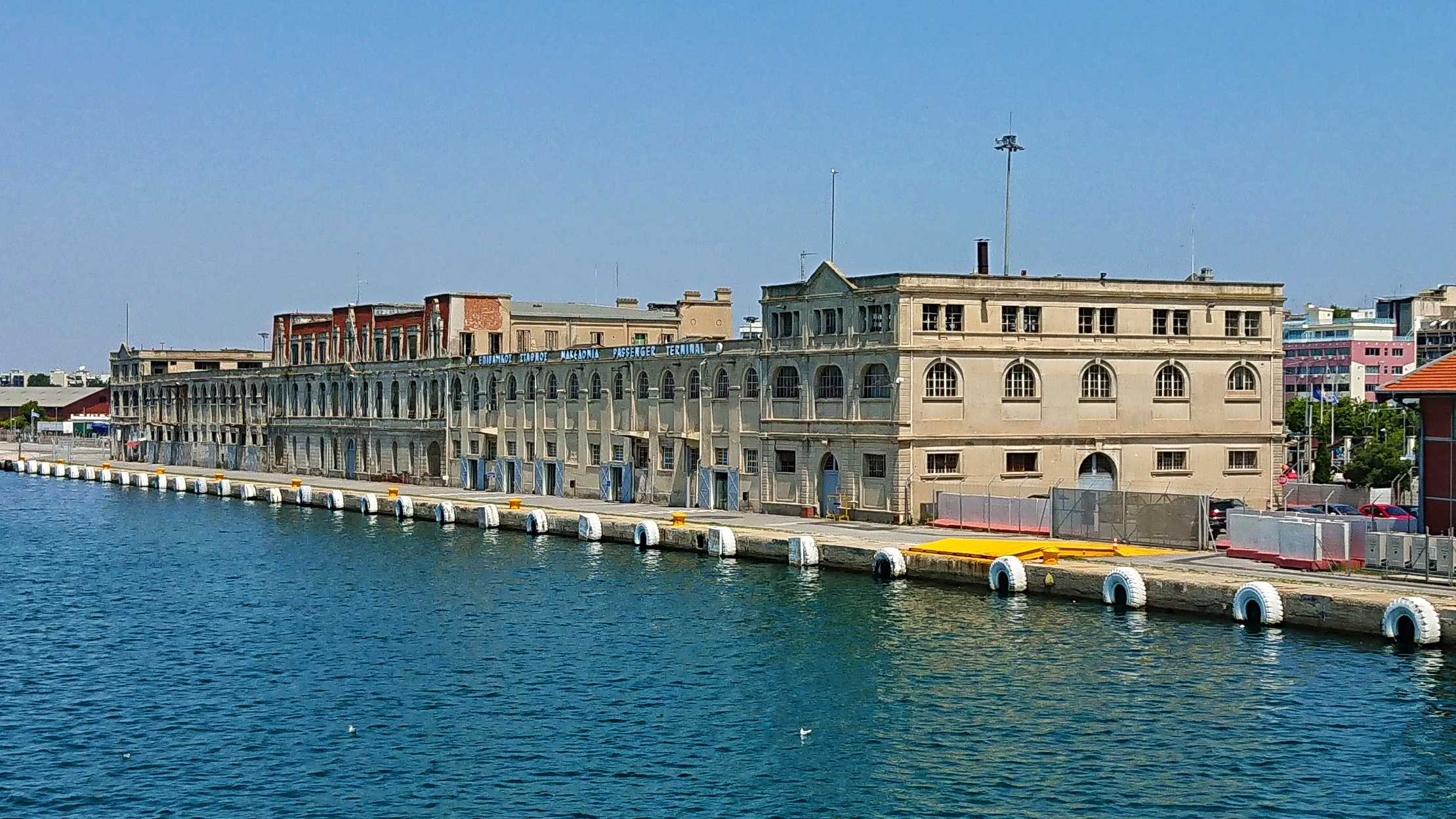
View of the Port of Thessaloniki

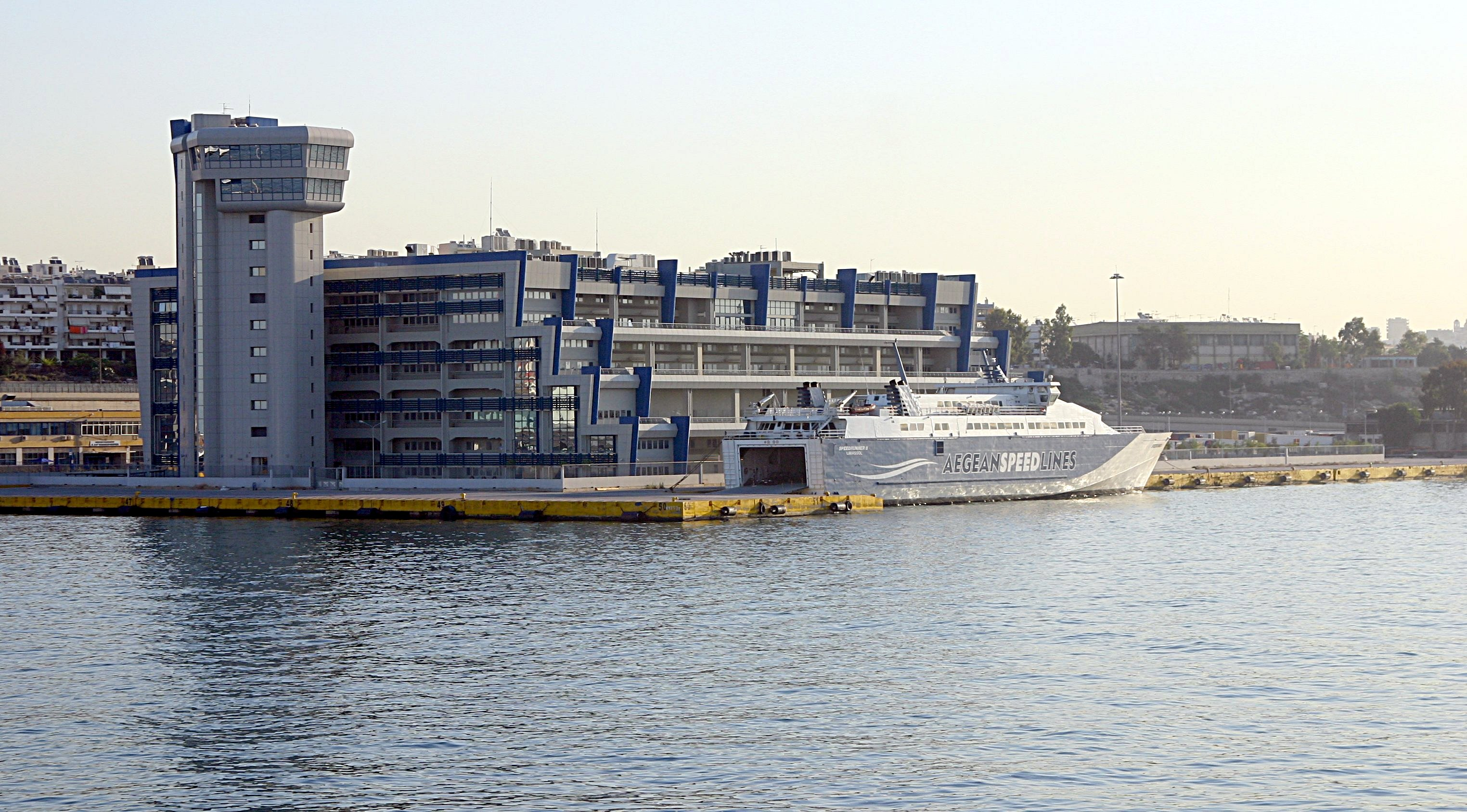
The Ministry of Shipping at the Port of Piraeus

Many changes and upheavals affected their markets: the Russian Revolution, the collapse of the Ottoman Empire and restrictions in Egypt that closed their markets to foreigners. The Greek grain merchants in London and Odessa lost access to their traditional grain suppliers and markets and, rather than close, they seized the chance to invest in merchant fleets of steamships, and specialized in tramp shipping.

The Second World War inflicted exceptionally heavy losses on the Greek merchant fleet. Following the Italian attack on Greece in October 1940, the Greek government requisitioned the merchant fleet and, through an agreement with the British authorities, placed the great majority of its ocean-going vessels under charter to the British Ministry of War Transport. Greek ships were employed extensively in Allied transport, carrying food, fuel, military equipment and other supplies, while Greek seafarers faced the same dangers as other Allied merchant mariners, including submarine attacks, mines and air attacks. By the end of the war, approximately three-quarters of the Greek merchant fleet's pre-war tonnage had been lost, while more than 2,000 Greek merchant seamen had died.[2] After the war, Greek shipowners rebuilt their fleets with American surplus shipping. In 1946–47, around 100 Liberty ships were acquired by Greek owners on favorable terms, providing an important basis for the rapid expansion of Greek-owned shipping in the post-war period.[3] Greek owners subsequently expanded particularly in tramp shipping and tanker operations, contributing to the emergence of Greece as one of the world's leading maritime powers.

== Modern Greek Merchant Navy ==
After the end of World War II, the Greek-run fleets were able to re-establish themselves under their national flag. The changing dynamics saw them more closely aligned with their own national state and the establishment of the Greek Merchant Marine service.

During 2010–2011, in terms of ship categories, Greek companies had 32.5% of the world's tankers and 23.8% of the world's bulk carriers (in dwt). An additional equivalent of 20.05% of the world's tanker dwt was on order, with another 14.1% of bulk carriers also on order. Shipping is one of the country's most important industries. In 2010–2011, it accounted for 8% of GDP, employed about 290,000 people (8% of the workforce), and represented 1/3 of the country's trade deficit. Earnings from shipping amounted to €35.4 billion in 2014, while between 2000 and 2010 Greek shipping contributed a total of €280 billion (almost the country's public debt in 2014 and 4.5 times the receipts from the European Union in the period 2000–2013). A European Community Shipowners' Association report for 2013–2014 reveals that the Greek flag is the first-most-used internationally for shipping, while it ranks first in the EU; the same ECSA report showed that there are approximately 950 Greek shipping companies in operation.

Counting shipping as quasi-exports and in terms of monetary value, Greece has ranked 4th globally in 2011 having "exported" shipping services worth $17.704B; only Denmark, Germany and South Korea have ranked higher during that year.

According to Petrofin Research’s annual survey on Greek shipping finance, bank financing grew by 11.5% in 2025, reaching nearly $60 billion, while the Greek orderbook surged from 511 vessels at end-2024 to 666 vessels by end-2025, a growth driven primarily by Greek banks, which recorded a 34% increase in their lending portfolios and expanded their share of newbuilding finance to 58% of total forward commitments.

Greek shipping services "exports"
Year	2000	2001	2002	2003	2004	2005	2006-2008	2009	2010	2011
Global ranking	5th	5th	5th	4th	3rd	5th	-^{b}	5th	6th	4th
"Exports" (US$ million)	7,558.995	7,560.559	7,527.175	10,114.736	15,402.209	16,127.623	-^{b}	17,033.714	18,559.292	17,704.132
"Exports" (€ million)	8,172.559	8,432.670	7,957.654	8,934.660	12,382.636	12,949.869	-^{b}	12,213.786	13,976.558	12,710.859
GDP (€ million)	137,930.1	146,427.6	156,614.3	172,431.8	185,265.7	193,049.7^{b}	n/a	231,081.2^{p}	222,151.5^{p}	208,531.7^{p}
"Exports" as %GDP	5.93	5.76	5.08	5.18	6.68	6.71	n/a	5.29	6.29	6.10
	b source reports break in time series; p source characterises data as provisional									

== International Maritime Organization ==
The 7th Secretary General (2003–2011) of the International Maritime Organization, Efthymios Mitropoulos, was from Greece.
