= Ceres Hellenic Shipping Enterprises =

Ceres Hellenic Enterprises is a large traditional Greek ship management company based in London. It was founded by George Livanos in 1949, but family shipping interests in fact date back to 1824. It is currently run by Peter G. Livanos. The Livanos family's maritime legacy dates back to 1824, and Ceres continues to be family-controlled.

It owns, operates, buys and sells bulk carriers, container ships and tankers.

In 2000 its division Seachem Tankers Ltd. merged with the Norwegian-based Odfjell to create the Odfjell Seachem AS shipping company, one of the world's largest chemical tanker operators.

In 2001, the company entered into a joint venture with Italian shipping company Coeclerici, forming Coeclerici Ceres Bulk Carriers N.V. This collaboration combined their Capesize and Panamax fleets, creating a fleet of 19 vessels with a total gross tonnage exceeding 2.3 million tons. As part of this initiative, two Capesize vessels were ordered from Japanese shipyards, with deliveries scheduled for mid-2002 and early 2003. Coeclerici held a 66% stake in the joint venture, while Ceres Hellenic contributed both ships and capital to the partnership.

In spring 2005, its tanker fleet was sold to Euronav and the company was specialised in the management of bulk cargo and LNG carriers.

The company is private and has three major divisions: DryLog Ltd. (which makes investments in other companies involved in dry bulk shipping, as well as directly owning some ships), GasLog Ltd. (which owns LNG carrier ships and manages others under contract to multinational energy companies), and TankLog Ltd. (which is the second largest shareholder of Euronav, to which as mentioned it sold its tanker fleet in 2005).

Some shares in Gaslog Ltd. (less than 50%) were sold to the public in March 2012 via an initial public offering.

In November 2015, Peter G. Livanos, through his investment company Ceres Investments (Cyprus), sold 9 million shares of Euronav, representing a 5.7% stake in the company. The sale, valued at approximately $123.75 million based on the then-current NYSE share price, reduced Livanos's holding in Euronav from 8.12% to 2.46%.

The group purchases and operates merchant ships (often at distress sales) and sells them. It is a long term partner of JP Morgan Asset management for its maritime assets and investment department.

== Sustainability initiatives ==
In 2022, Ceres launched ECOLOG, a venture dedicated to CO_{2} transport as part of global carbon capture strategies. The company said it was going to start with the transportation of 5 million tons per year in 2025 to 2026 and reach 50 million tons by 2035.
