= George P. Livanos =

Greek shipping magnate (1926-1997)

- Born: 9 July 1926
- Died: 1 June 1997 (aged 70)
- Spouse: Fotini Carras
- Children: Peter; Marina
- Parent: Peter Livanos
- Relatives: Yiannis Carras (father-in-law)

George P. Livanos (9 July 1926 – 1 June 1997) was a Greek shipping magnate born in New Orleans, the son of Peter Livanos from Chios. He is sometimes confused with his cousin, George S. Livanos, the sole son of Stavros G. Livanos, a legend in Greek shipping and the founder of the Livanos shipping empire.

After the end of World War II, Livanos served in the Transportation Corps of the United States Army, first in Japan and then in Korea, where he was a sea captain in Army ships carrying cargo.

After earning a degree in Economics from the University of Athens, he founded his own company, Ceres Hellenic Shipping Enterprises, in 1949. Shortly after, he inherited his father's 30-ship fleet, which included the world's five largest supertankers.

Livanos managed his business from Lausanne. With over 100 ships, his fleet was the largest merchant navy in Greece. He also created a shipping company, which pioneered fast ferry services between the Greek Islands, introducing coastal passenger hydrofoils on an extensive network of routes linking the mainland with nearby islands. For two decades, the services operated under the Ceres Flying Dolphins' brand name, became a household expression in Greece. Loyalty to his Greek roots prompted Livanos to shun flags of convenience for his vessels, despite the enormous tax advantages that this would have meant. Instead his ships invariably flew the Greek flag.

Diversifying in latter years, he invested in real estate, and in banking with Basil Goulandris, another Lausanne-based Greek shipowner. In 1994, Livanos' fortune was an estimated US$3 billion. He was ahead of his time, as he had begun to heed warnings that abuse of the environment could destroy the planet and was involved in the protection of ocean and coastal waters. He founded the Hellenic Marine Environment Protection Association (HELMEPA) in 1982.

Livanos was an influential member of the Greek lobby in Washington. In 1988, he threw his backing behind the Presidential bid of the Democratic candidate and fellow Greek American, Michael Dukakis. He was also a close personal friend of long-serving Greek Prime Minister Andreas Papandreou.

Livanos married Fotini Carras, the daughter of the Greek shipowner Yiannis Carras, and had a son, Peter, and a daughter, Marina. He died in 1997, leaving his business to his son.
