= MS Oliva =

Bulk carrier built in 2009

Coordinates: 37°25′19″S 12°28′37″W

History
- Name: Oliva
- Owner: Dryships Inc
- Operator: TMS Bulkers
- Port of registry: Valletta, Malta
- Builder: Hudong Zhonghua, Shanghai
- Launched: 24 June 2009
- Completed: 2009
- Identification: Call sign: 9HA2075; IMO number: 9413705
- Fate: Wrecked 16 March 2011

General characteristics
- Class & type: Dry bulk carrier
- Tonnage: 40,170 GT; 75,208 DWT
- Length: 225 m (738 ft)
- Beam: 32.26 m (105.8 ft)
- Depth: 19.6 m (64 ft)
- Propulsion: 1 screw, MAN B&W engine
- Speed: 14 knots
- Crew: 22

The MS Oliva was a bulk carrier launched in 2009. On 16 March 2011, due to the risky navigation of trying to achieve the minimal allowed clearance of Nightingale Island of 10 nmi, and due to human error in navigation reducing the actual clearance to zero, the ship went aground off Nightingale Island, Tristan da Cunha, in the South Atlantic, at 4 am while on a voyage from Santos, Brazil to China with a cargo of soya beans.

The ship broke in two and was a total loss. All 22 crew were rescued. More than 800 tons of fuel oil leaked from the ship and coated some 20,000 northern rockhopper penguins. The remains of the ship have been left to be claimed by the ocean. There is an area of soya bean deposits and reduced sealife around the wreck due to the cargo of soya bean removing the oxygen from the water.

== Lifeboat ==
In February 2013, a lifeboat from the Oliva washed up on a beach in the Coorong National Park in south-east South Australia.

The lifeboat was later put on display adjacent to the former Cape Jaffa lighthouse in Kingston SE, South Australia, where it forms part of the town's National Trust maritime display.

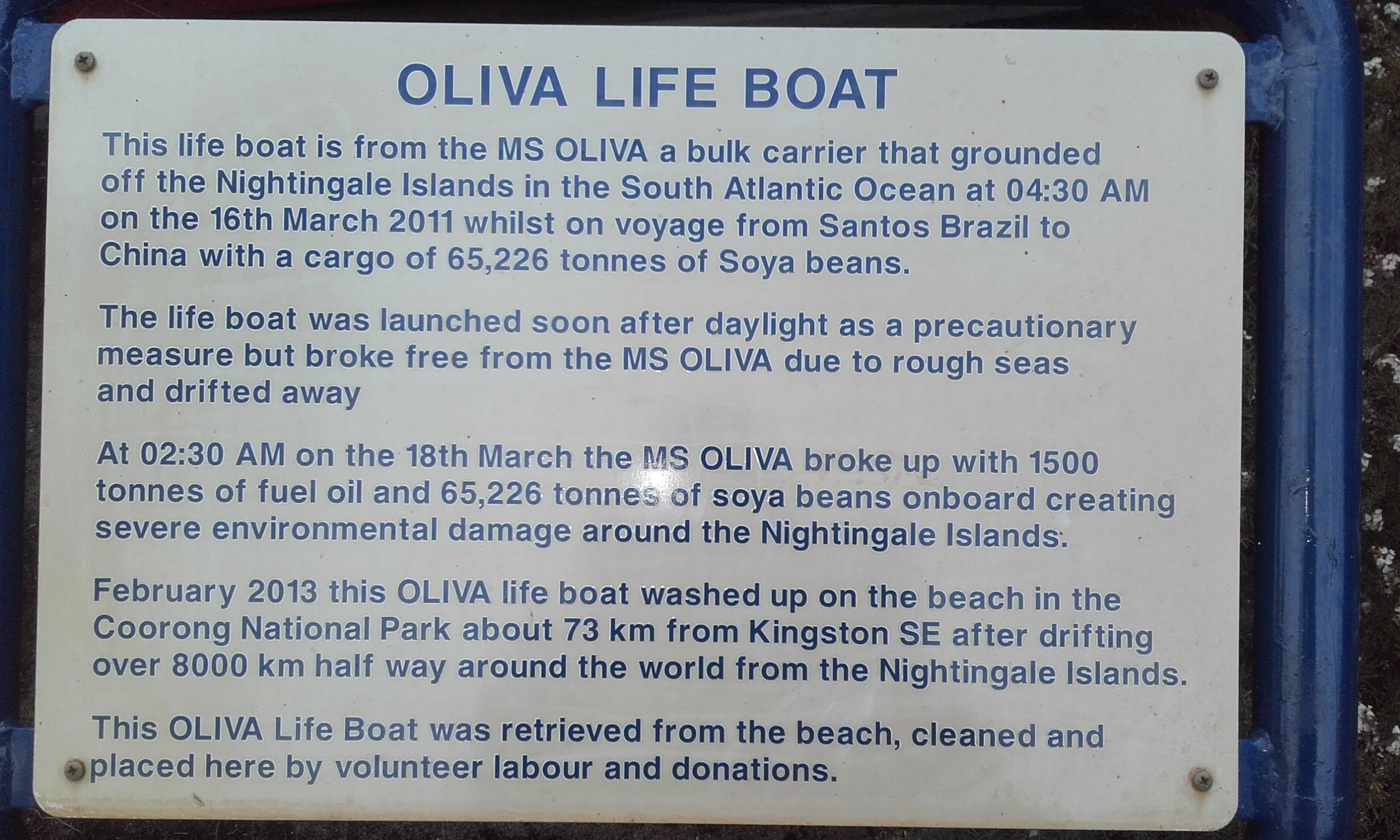
Plaque in front of the lifeboat for MS Oliva which is now located adjacent to the former Cape Jaffa lighthouse in Kingston SE, South Australia.
