= Michel Emmanuel Rodocanachi =

Greek trader and banker (1821–1901)

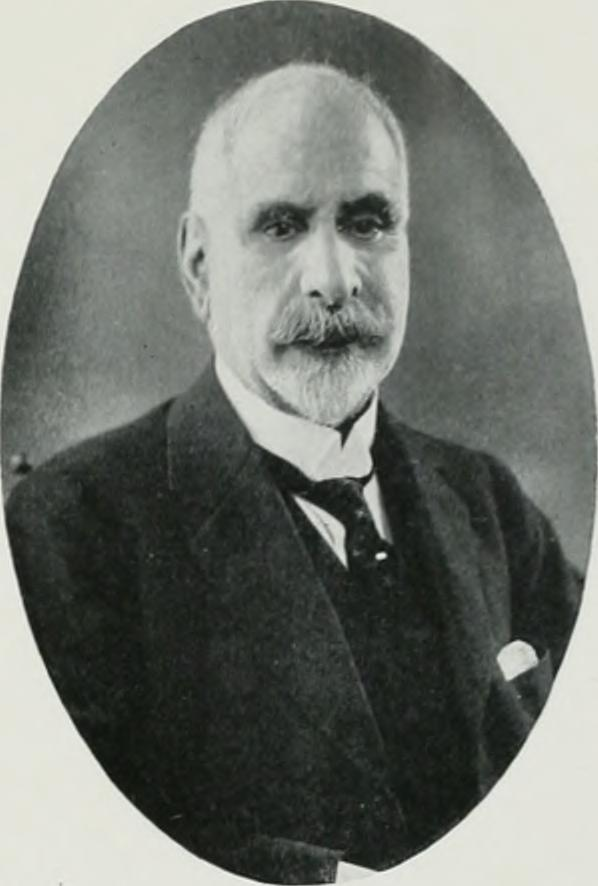
Michel Emmanuel Rodocanachi

Michel Emmanuel Rodocanachi (Greek: Μιχαήλ Εμμανουήλ Ροδοκανάκης; 1821–1901) was a Greek trader and banker of London.

His parents were members of the nobility on their home at Chios, related to the influential Vlastos and Mavrogordatos families. They escaped the Chios massacre, settling in Marseille where they rebuilt their shipping and trading business as Rodocanachi Sons & Co. Recognising the importance of having a presence on the London market, in 1830 they sent their son there to cover their interests and work with other family members who traded grain in Odesa, Saint Petersburg, Italy and Marseille. In 1853, he returned to Marseille to marry Ariadne Michael Petrocochino.

In London, he obtained membership of the Baltic Exchange and, assisted by other members of the Greek diaspora, notably the Ralli Brothers, he bought ships to transport the grain that he traded, and developed a property portfolio, including the Royal Automobile Club Buildings Co.

This financial foundation enabled him to participate in the founding of the Imperial Bank with fellow Anglo-Greeks Petrocochino and Schilizzi. When the Imperial bank was acquired by the London Joint Stock Bank, his eldest son Emmanuel Michael Rodocanachi (1855–1932) became a director of that bank, in addition to the other family companies.

Michel was an active member of the Greek Orthodox community in London and raised money for the construction of St Sophia's Cathedral there. He moved to Worthing in his later years as his health failed, calling his house Chios. However, he died in London in 1901. He is buried, with his son Emmanuel in West Norwood Cemetery.

Rodocanachi Sons & Co. did not survive long after Emmanuel's retirement in 1925; it collapsed in the Great Depression as a result of bad debts due from failed German and Italian trading partners.

== Sources ==
- Stuart Thompstone 'Rodocanachi, Michael Emmanuel' Oxford Dictionary of National Biography (subscription)
- Christopher Long, Rodocanachi Family of Chios
- The Times Rodocanachi Sons & Co 27 November 1929 & 2 September 1933
