= Lourdata =

Village in Greece

Lourdata Λουρδάτα
- Community
- Location within Greece
- Coordinates: 38°06′58″N 20°38′06″E
- Country: Greece
- Administrative region: Ionian Islands
- Regional unit: Cephalonia
- Municipality: Argostoli
- Municipal unit: Leivatho

Population (2021)
  - Community: 147
- Time zone: UTC+2 (EET)
  - Summer (DST): UTC+3 (EEST)

Lourdata is a village on the south coast of Cephalonia, Greece. It is part of the municipal unit Leivatho.
