= Panayis Athanase Vagliano =

Anglo-Greek businessman

Panayis Athanase Vagliano (Greek: Παναγής Βαλλιάνος, romanized: Panagis Vallianos; 1814–1902) was a Greek merchant and shipowner, acclaimed as the 'father of modern Greek shipping'.

He was born in Kerameies on the Greek island of Cefalonia, where he first became a sailor, before becoming part of the Greek diaspora.

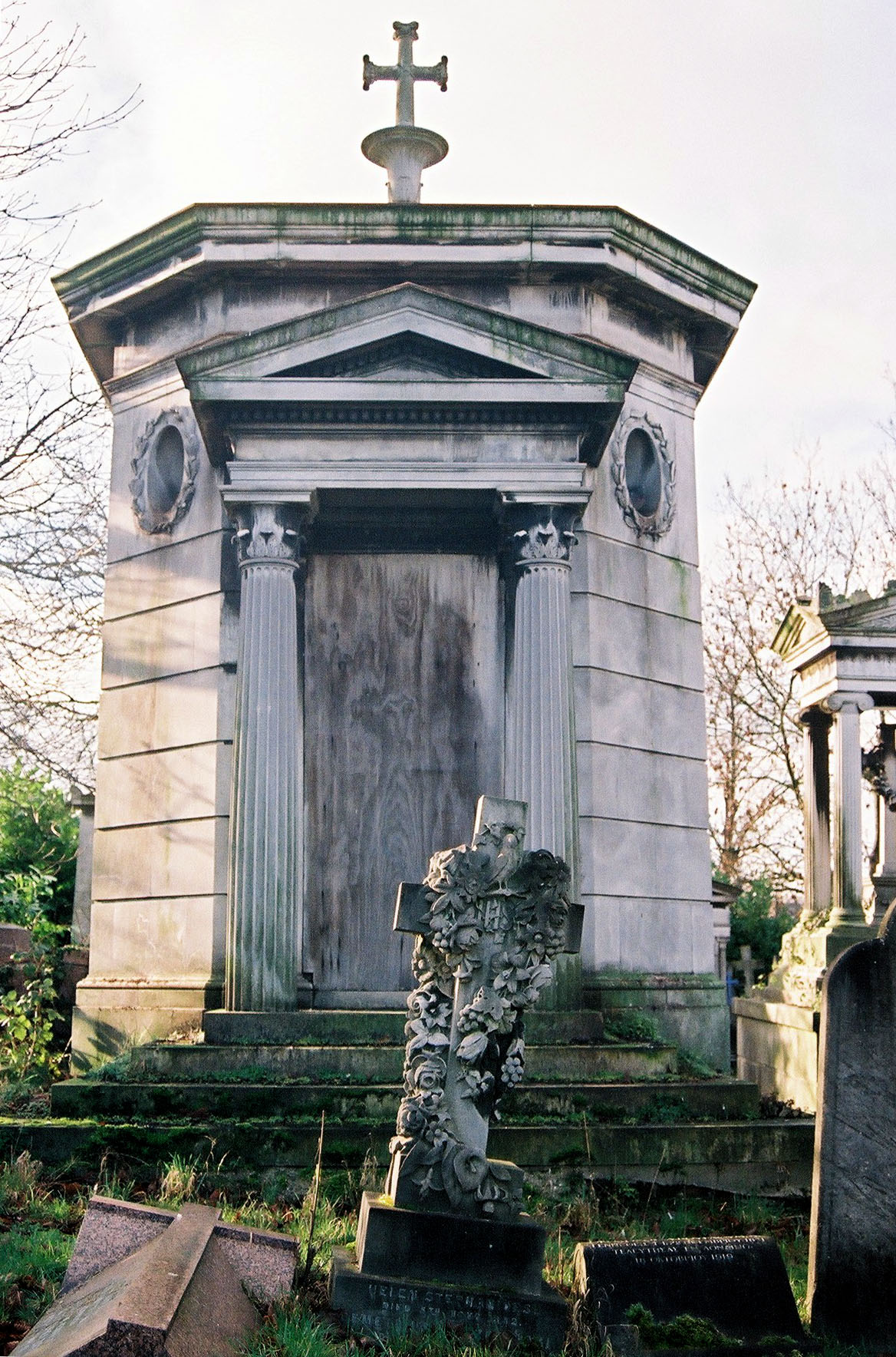
Vagliano's mausoleum in West Norwood Cemetery.

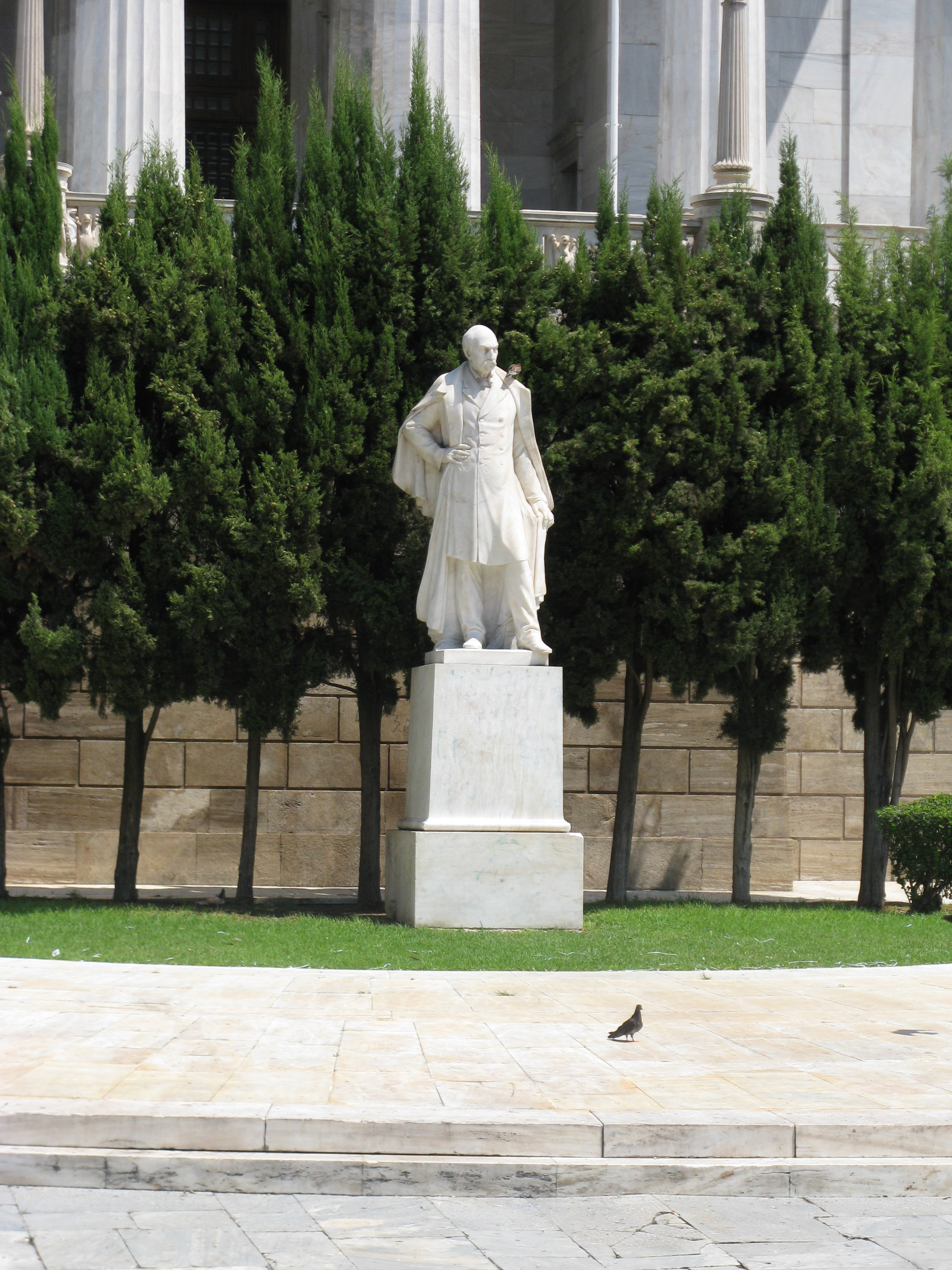
A high statue of Vagliano (by Georgios Bonanos) stands outside the National Library of Greece in Athens that he co-founded.

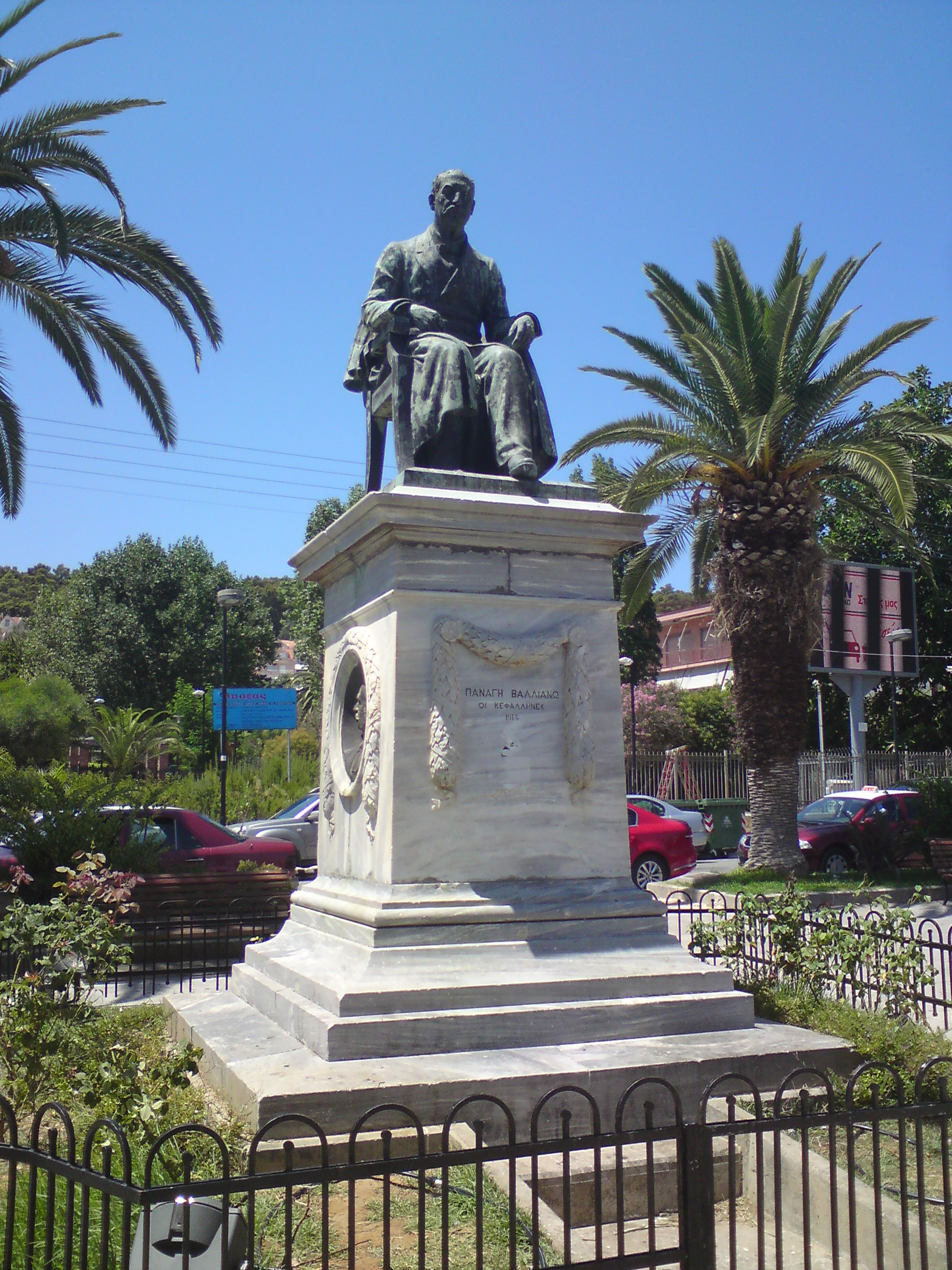
Statue of Vagliano in Argostoli.

== Russia ==
He joined his brothers Marinos and Andreas, initially settling in Taganrog, Russian Empire around 1840. Together they formed Vaglianos Bros. as grain-merchants and shippers, making good profits from the high prices of grain during the Crimean War. It is said that they sometimes bought the whole Russian wheat export crop, and were pioneers of exchange-traded wheat contracts.

After the war ended, fellow Greeks had problems finding shippers for their cargoes from the Great Powers; Vaglianos Bros. stepped in and offered them financing and transport on their own ships.

== London ==
Vagliano moved his business to London in 1858, as grain merchants, bankers, and shippers, but kept in contact with Russia through his brothers. There was already a well-established Greek merchant community in London, and they assisted his membership of the Baltic Exchange from where his business thrived. His operation based in London avoided restrictive Greek commercial laws, enabling him to loan money to other Greeks for shipbuilding, and he was quoted as wishing for 'the seas covered with a thick forest of Greek masts'.

== Legacies ==
Vagliano Bros. continued operating after his death, and survived the loss of its traditional markets in Russia and Turkey after World War I by concentrating on shipping and finance; in this way they helped develop Greek shipping dynasties.

However, he is probably best remembered in his native Greece for a donation that funded the National Library of Greece building (the Vallianeion Megaron) in Athens. He was also a philanthropist in London, and donated money towards Saint Sophia Cathedral in London and the Greek Orthodox cemetery within West Norwood Cemetery, where he is interred next to his brother Marinos in a grand neoclassical Greek mausoleum modelled on the Tower of the Winds, now listed Grade II. At his death he was enormously wealthy (his estate was valued at £3M) and he willed a considerable legacy to Kefalonia for charitable purposes.

== Sources ==
- Stuart Thompstone Vagliano, Panayis Athanase Oxford Dictionary of National Biography
- Friends of West Norwood Cemetery ref: Vagliano & Vallianos
