= Euroseas (company) =

Greek shipping company

Euroseas, Ltd. (Nasdaq: ESEA is a shipping company that was founded about a century ago and became public in 2005. The company is based in Maroussi, Athens, Greece.

== Profile ==
Euroseas operates in the dry cargo, drybulk, and container shipping markets worldwide and is also a provider of seaborne transportation for dry bulk and containerized cargoes. It owns and operates drybulk carriers that transport iron ore, coal, and grains, as well as bauxite, phosphate, and fertilizers. The company also owns and operates container ships and multipurpose vessels that transport dry and refrigerated containerized cargoes, primarily manufactured products and perishables.

Euroseas employs its vessels on spot and period charters, as well as through pool arrangements. The Company has a fleet of 11 vessels, including 4 drybulk carriers, 6 container ships and 1 multipurpose dry cargo vessel, for fleet grand total of 375,060 tons deadweight (DWT) (10,179 twenty-foot equivalent units (TEU)). Euroseas' 4 drybulk carriers have a total cargo capacity of 212,443 DWT, its 6 container ships have a cargo capacity of 140,049 DWT (9,229 TEU) and its 1 multipurpose vessel has a cargo capacity of 22,568 DWT or 950 TEU.

== History ==
Euroseas' roots go back four generations, prior to the existence of steam and diesel engines, when the company's ships were propelled by sails. Those days ships were maximum 1000 tons and cost about 3000 pounds sterling to build. According to company records, the first Pittas Family shipowner was Nikolaos F. Pittas. He was born on the island of Chios in Greece in 1837. The first vessel he owned was Ypapanti, a 700-ton wooden, sail vessel that was built in Chios in 1873. He became the captain of the ship and his younger brothers and other relatives and friends joined him as crew. The vessel traded in the Mediterranean and Black Sea and the Captain himself always found its next employment from the destination port. He was at all times the Commercial, Technical and Financial Manager of the vessel. No office ashore existed as communications were so poor that people at the home island in Chios often had no news of their whereabouts for months.

Business was flourishing at the time and soon N. F. Pittas could afford the purchase of more ships. The next ships purchased were the "Sotiras", a 780-ton ship that was bought in 1876 and the barque "Chios" the first 1,000-ton ship which was built in Chios in 1878. A few other ships followed. Some were entrusted initially to brothers of N. F. Pittas and subsequent purchases to his sons.

== Key executives ==
- Mr Aristides J. Pittas — Chairman, Chief Exec. Officer and Press
- Dr Anastasios Aslidis — Chief Financial Officer, Principal Accounting Officer, Treasurer

== See also ==
- List of companies of Greece
