= Ocean Rig =

Operator of semi-submersible oil platforms and underwater drillships and based in Athens

Ocean Rig UDW Inc.
- Industry: Petroleum industry
- Founded: 1996; 30 years ago
- Defunct: December 5, 2018; 7 years ago
- Fate: Acquired by Transocean
- Headquarters: Athens, Greece
- Key people: Pankaj Khanna (President & CEO)
- Services: Offshore drilling Well drilling Oil platforms

Ocean Rig UDW Inc. was an operator of semi-submersible oil platforms and underwater drillships and was based in Athens. In 2018, the company was acquired by Transocean.

The company owned 2 semi-submersibles and 4 ultra deepwater drillships.

The company was majority owned by DryShips, controlled by George Economou.

== History ==
The company was established in 1996 as Ocean Rig ASA.

Between 1997 and 2008, the company was listed on the Oslo Stock Exchange.

In 2010, shares in the company were spun off by DryShips and the company was listed on NASDAQ.

In 2011, the Leiv Eirikson finished operations the Black Sea on contract to Petrobras and TPAO and went to the Arctic on contract to Cairn Energy.

In March 2017, the company filed bankruptcy in the United States. The reorganization was completed in September 2017.

Effective January 1, 2018, Pankaj Khanna became President & CEO of the company.

In December 2018, the company was acquired by Transocean.
