= George Economou (shipbuilder) =

Greek shipbuilder and art collector

George Economou Γεώργιος Οικονόμου
- Born: August 4, 1953 (age 73); Athens, Greece
- Education: Massachusetts Institute of Technology
- Occupations: Shipowner & Art collector
- Board member of: Owner of Cardiff Marine Ltd; Chairman of DryShips Inc; Major shareholder of Danaos Corporation

George Economou or Georgios Ekonomou (Γεώργιος Οικονόμου, born 1953) is a Greek billionaire shipowner, CEO of DryShips Inc. and Ocean Rig, and the owner of Cardiff Marine. Economou owns oil tankers as well as dry bulk ships and manages them through Cardiff Marine. He was on the Forbes Magazines list of the world's billionaires on place 707 and he is included in the Lloyd's List "One Hundred Most Influential People in the Shipping Industry" list, ranking 13th in 2025.

== Early life ==
Economou was born in Athens, where his father owned a small paper-products company. He studied at the Massachusetts Institute of Technology (MIT), where he obtained an MSc in naval architecture and marine engineering, and another MSc in shipping and shipbuilding management.

== Career ==
In 2005, DryShips (DRYS) was listed on Nasdaq, but Cardiff Marine is privately owned by Economou. Economou owns 34% of DryShips, but has been accused of running it like a private company for personal profit at shareholders' expense, destroying any shareholder value over the last several years with massive dilution and dubious forms of financing. Economou has allegedly lied to the SEC in multiple 6-K filings and is now being investigated. Despite the privileged tax status of the shipping industry in Greece - the industry pays no tax on international earnings brought into the country under rules incorporated in Greece's constitution in 1967 - traders and other finance professionals caution against investing in companies run by Economou, on the grounds that his business strategy is to acquire assets personally and sell them on to his public companies for a profit, Economou getting cash while shareholders inherit operating risks exacerbated by further share dilutions. Lloydslist remarks that "No one who calls their yacht Barracuda can be too concerned about safeguarding an angelic image."

Since 2008, Economou has allegedly been doing affiliate transactions from his own private company to steal shareholder value.

In March 2015, he had a net worth of $1.5 billion, and a fleet of 116 ships, according to Bloomberg.

In November 2016, DryShips announced $100 million in financing from Kalani, a mysterious company based in the British Virgin Islands and Jersey, Channel Islands, which the Panama Papers show was incorporated on March 22, 1990, but struck off on October 31, 1991, after defaulting. Currently, it is impossible to prove Economou is directly involved in the ownership of Kalani due to the British Virgin Islands status as an offshore tax haven that provides secrecy for its clients.

On December 15, 2016, DryShips announced a “comprehensive refinancing, deleveraging and strategic repositioning” that included upping the company's credit facility to $200 million. It also included a $33.5 million payment to Economou.

On December 27, 2016, Kalani came up with another $200 million refinancing agreement. DryShips then announced a new option contract to purchase 4 VLGC ships from other companies controlled by Economou at a total potential cost of $334 million for DryShips shareholders. Investors and traders speculate that Economou pulls the strings at Kalani, using it to recapitalize DryShips and unload assets at the expense of DryShips shareholders.

In 2016 and 2017 Economou diluted DryShips shares four times through reverse split (total reverse split is 12,000 : 1) to decrease DryShips outstanding shares to 1 million. Then he issued 60 million new shares to make affiliate transactions from his own private company to sell DryShips four overpriced very large gas carriers (VLGC). In 2017, he reverse split the shares again at 8:1.

== Art collector ==
In 2006, he started collecting art, mainly from European artists of the early 20th century such as George Grosz, Pablo Picasso, Christian Schad, Werner Schramm, Andy Warhol, Diego Rivera, Fernando Botero, Hermann Scherer and Heinrich Hoerle.

== Personal life ==
Economou's two former wives own a total 15% of DryShips. His sister, Chryssoula Kandylidis, owns 30% of Cardiff Marine. His nephew Antonios Kandylidis, is the founder and largest shareholder in OceanFreight, which went public on the Nasdaq in 2007.
