= Variety Cruises =

Private yacht cruise line

- Type: Private cruises
- Industry: Cruises
- Founded: 2006
- Founder: Lakis Venetopoulos
- Headquarters: Athens, Greece.
- Area served: Greece, Turkey, The Adriatic Sea, North Sea, Costa Rica & Panama, Cuba, the Canary Islands, Seychelles, Costa Rica & Panama, and Cape Verde
- Key people: Lakis Venetopoulos, CEO, Chairman and President; Dimitris Vassilakis, COO
- Services: Cruises
- Website: www.varietycruises.com

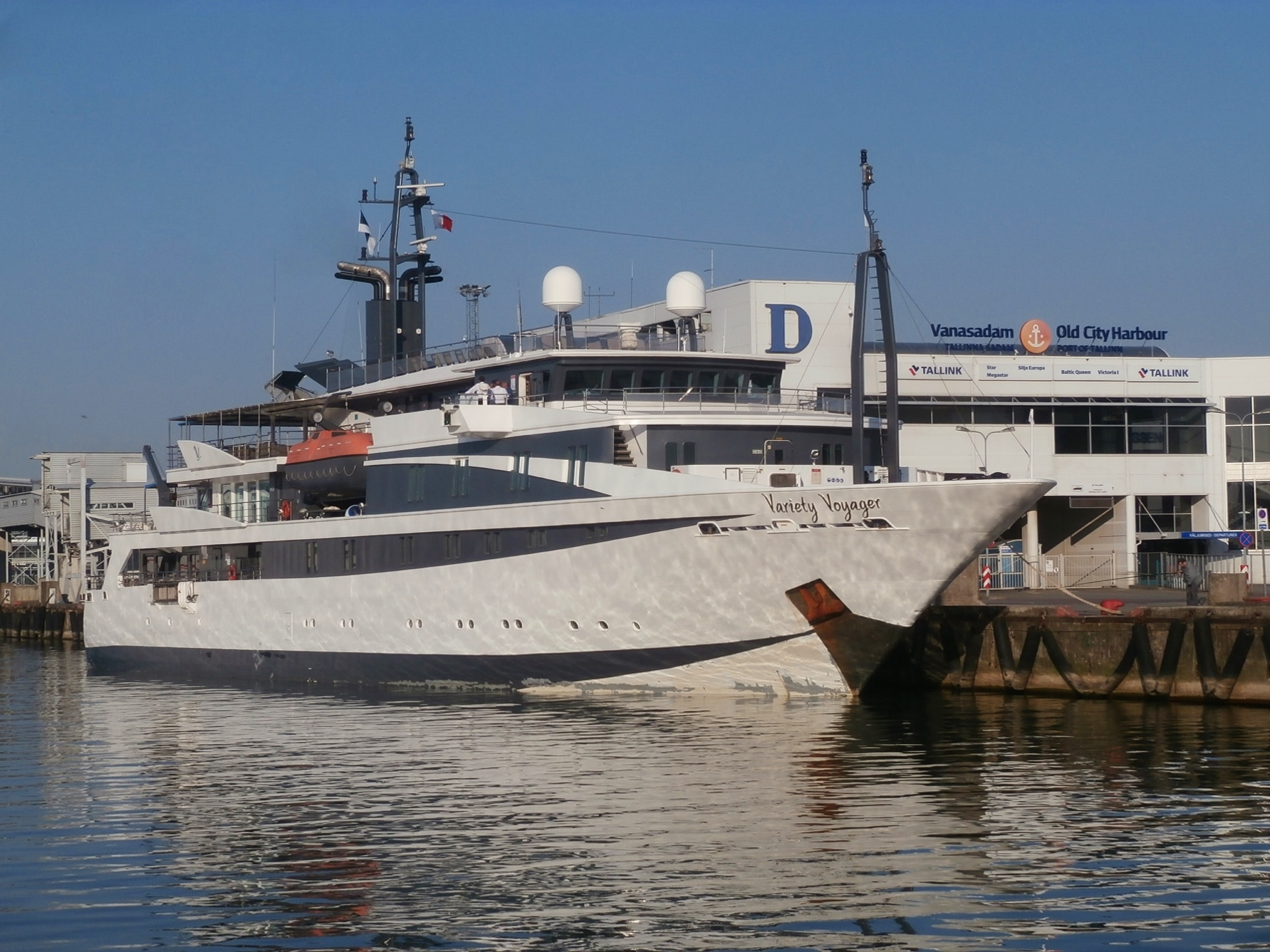
Variety Voyager

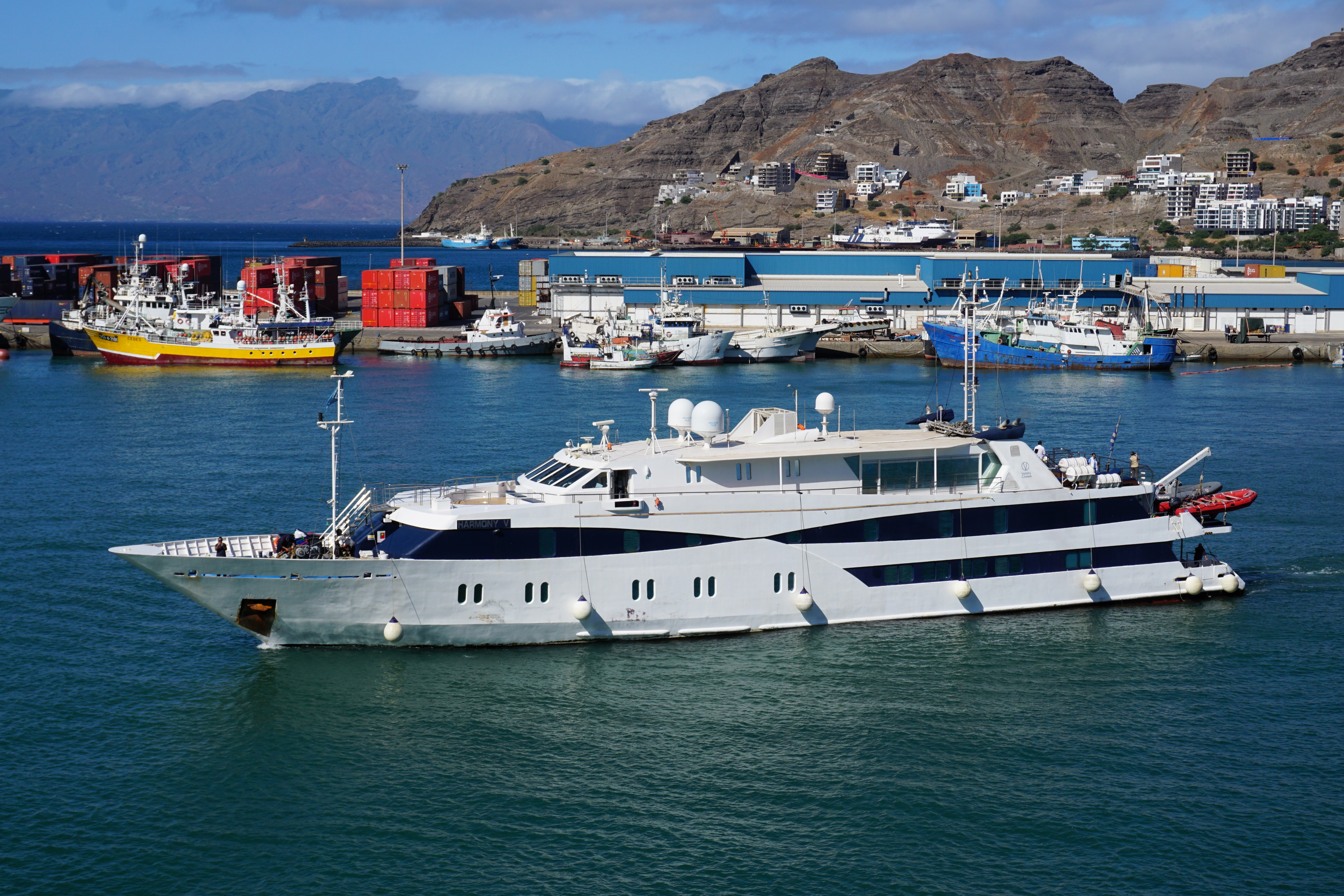
Harmony V leaving Mindelo

Variety Cruises is a private yacht cruise line based in Athens, Greece. It owns and operates a number of small cruise ships and yachts. The company was founded in 2006 by Lakis Venetopoulos.

== History ==
Variety Cruises was established in 2006 following the merge of Zeus Tours & Yacht Cruises, a third generation cruise and tourism business operating since 1949, and Hellas Yachts, which started operating small ships cruises in 1993. The company’s history dates back to 1949 when the original founder of Zeus Cruises built the company’s first ship Eleutherios in order to fill a need for educational travel in Greece.

In 2013, the company founded a school project in The Gambia entitled The Lamin Koto School Project

== Company ==
The company has established itself as one of the pioneers in theme cruises including gay and lesbian-themed cruises.

== Destinations ==
The cruise lines' first destination was Greece, but since the company's expansion a number of destinations include the Adriatic Sea, Costa Rica & Panama, Cuba, the Canary Islands, Seychelles, and Cape Verde. The company's West Africa destination was featured by CNN for their Rivers of West Africa program.

== Fleet ==
Variety Cruises runs a fleet of eight small cruise ships, in addition to owning and renting a fleet of 4 private yachts. The company's flagship is the Variety Voyager, followed by the Galileo, the Panorama, Panorama II, the Harmony V, the Harmony G, the Pegasos, and the Callisto. The company also owns a fleet of smaller yachts solely available for charter including the Obsession, the Absolute King, Christiane, and the Monte Carlo.

Name	Built	Builder	Gross Tonnage	Flag	Length	Draft	Pax Capacity
To Callisto	1963	Kremer-Werft - Elmshorn	499 tons	Saint Kitts and Nevis	49 m.	3,5 m.	34 guests
Harmony V	1985	Dentas Shipbuilding & Repair	693 tons	Greece	55 m.	3 m.	49 guests
Pegasos	1989	Glynos Athens	773 tons	Greece	44 m.	3 m.	44 guests
Pan Orama	1991	Kastrinos	674 tons	Greece	53 m.	5,5 m.	49 guests
Galileo	1995	Fratzis Shipyard	564 tons	Greece	48 m.	2,8 m.	49 guests
Harmony G	2001	Savvas Shipyard	498 tons	Greece	54 m.	3,7 m.	44 guests
Pan Orama II	2004	Koutalis & Kostergias Shipyard	498 tons	Greece	49 m.	4,5 m.	49 guests
Variety Voyager	2012	Psarros Shipyard	1,593 tons	Marshall Islands	66 m.	3,5 m.	72 guests
