= Schilizzi =

Schilizzi is a surname, an Italianization of the surname of the Chiot noble Skylitsi family. Notable people with this surname include:

- Alexandra Helen Schilizzi (1904–1988), British lecturer and politician
- Demetrius Stefanovich Schilizzi (1839–1893), Greek banker and Italian consul
- Helena Schilizzi (1873–1959), British philanthropist

== See also ==
- Mausoleo Schilizzi, mausoleum built in the 1880s, commissioned by banker Matteo Schilizzi
