= Peratata =

Peratata Περατάτα
- Community
- Location within Greece
- Coordinates: 38°08′07″N 20°33′27″E
- Country: Greece
- Administrative region: Ionian Islands
- Regional unit: Kefalonia
- Municipality: Argostoli
- Municipal unit: Leivatho
- Elevation: 150 m (490 ft)

Population (2021)
  - Community: 845
- Time zone: UTC+2 (EET)
  - Summer (DST): UTC+3 (EEST)
- Postal code: 281 00
- Area code: 26710
- Vehicle registration: KE

Peratata (Greek: Περατάτα) is a village and a community in the municipal unit of Leivatho, in the southern part of the island of Cephalonia, Greece. It is situated at the foot of a hill, which is crowned by the Agios Georgios fortress. The community consists of the villages Peratata and Kastro. The western part of Peratata is referred to as Travliata. Peratata is 2 km north of Kerameies, 3 km south of Troianata, 8 km southeast of Argostoli and 19 km west of Poros. The road from Argostoli to Poros and Skala passes through the village.

The Agios Georgios fortress on the hill north of Peratata dates from the 12th century, but the present structure was built by Venetians in the 16th century. It was the capital of the island until 1757. The fortress covers an area of 16,000 square metres (170,000 sq ft), and the perimeter of its walls is 600 m. The 1953 Ionian earthquake caused great damage in Peratata.

== Historical population ==
Year	Population community
1981	340
1991	384
2001	564
2011	800
2021	845

== See also ==
- List of settlements in Cephalonia
