= Excel Maritime =

Defunct Greek shipping company

Excel Maritime Carriers Ltd.
- Company type: Public
- Traded as: NYSE: EXM
- Industry: Shipping
- Founded: February 1988
- Defunct: 2013
- Fate: Bankruptcy
- Headquarters: Athens, Greece
- Area served: Worldwide
- Key people: Gabriel Panayotides (former Chairman)
- Number of employees: 1226
- Website: www.excelmaritime.com

Excel Maritime Carriers (Excel) was a Greek shipping company specializing in the transport of dry bulk cargo such as iron ore, coal and grains, as well as bauxite, fertilizers and steel products. The company went bankrupt in 2013 and the remains of the company was acquired by Oaktree Capital Management as part of the plan approved by the US bankruptcy court.

Prior to its bankruptcy, it was the largest bulk carrier by deadweight tonnage of any U.S.-listed company. Approximately one-third of all seaborne trade is dry bulk related. Excel Maritime was a component of the NYSE Composite Index and the PHLX Marine Shipping Index.

The stock was de-listed from the exchanges in 2013 as per exchange rules of listing after the bankruptcy.

== History ==
=== Foundation and development ===
The company was incorporated under the laws of the Republic of Liberia and had a headquarters in Athens, Greece. Its registered office was in Hamilton, Bermuda. It is a holding company composed of separate wholly owned subsidiaries for each vessel which are incorporated in Liberia, the Marshall Islands, and Cyprus. The technical management of the fleet was undertaken by Maryville Maritime Inc., based in Piraeus, Greece, and was also a wholly owned subsidiary. Subsidiary Excel Management Ltd. had been contracted to provide brokering services for the company's vessels.

=== IPO ===
The company was first listed on the AMEX and NASDAQ in February 1989 under the name B&H Maritime. In October 1997 B&H, which had ceased operations and disposed of its assets, was acquired and re-listed on the AMEX in 1998 as Excel Maritime Carriers Ltd. The company was first listed on the NYSE on September 15, 2005.

In 2008, the company appointed Gabriel Panayotides as CEO. He had been chairman of the board since February 1998. The former CEO Stamatis Molaris, CEO of Quintana from January 2005 to April 2008, resigned on February 23, 2009. Prior to that, the CEO was Christopher Georgakis (former CEO of Oceanaut) who resigned in February 2008. In August 2008, Mr. Georgakis filed litigation claiming a breach of his stock option agreement along with charges of defamation.

=== Acquisitions and growth ===
On 15, April, 2008, the company completed a merger with Quintana Maritime as a wholly owned subsidiary.

On November 11, 2008, the MV Powerful, a Danish-flagged cargo ship owned by Excel Maritime Carriers Ltd., was attacked with the intention of hijack by Somali pirates using assault rifles in the Arabian Sea's Gulf of Aden in the Horn of Africa.

On January 29, 2008, the company agreed to acquire Quintana Maritime for US$ 764 million in cash and 23.5 million common shares for a total of US$ 1.44 billion. With the acquisition, the company more than doubled the number of vessels it owned, acquiring 5 Capesize, 14 Kamsarmax and 11 Panamax carriers. In addition, it inherited newbuilding contracts for 7 Capesize vessels for delivery in 2010. As of October 2009, the company expected to take delivery of only 2 of these and would share 50% ownership with external parties on one of them. No deposits were forfeited for the 5 vessels not delivered. Following the acquisition, 14 of the company's Kamsarmax vessels and 3 Panamax vessels were placed on time charters to Bunge. Along with the acquisition, the company entered into a US$ 1 billion term loan and a US$ 400 million revolving loan at LIBOR + 1.25% (hedged with swap agreements at ~5%) which allowed it to refinance most of its loans.

=== Bankruptcy 2013 ===
Excel Maritime Carriers Ltd. filed for a pre-negotiated chapter 11 case on July 1, 2013. The bondholders, unsatisfied with the terms originally proposed by Excel, reached an agreement in late November 2013. The agreement was reached and ratified on January 27, 2014, with Excel expecting to emerge from chapter 11 in mid-February 2014. Upon completion of the restructuring process, the company's total pre-petition debt of $920 million was reduced to approximately $300 million.

In 2013, the stock was de-listed from the NYSE as per their rules of listing. It continued to trade on the over-the-counter market under the stock under the symbol EXMCQ, This was halted on Friday February 14, 2014 at 12:23.

Gabriel Panayotides, chairman of the board, together with the other members of Excel's management team, continued to lead the company until they were removed by the new owner.

== Revenue ==
The company earned the majority of its revenue from spot and time charters of its vessels. The spot rate is largely dependent upon the Baltic Dry Index which reflects the current supply and demand for dry bulk vessels. Longer-term charter contracts provide stable revenues which are not subject to the same volatility of spot rates. In 2008, the company derived approximately 23% of its revenue from a single charterer, Bunge. Upon chartering, the charterer is free to trade the vessel worldwide, so geographic deployment statistics are not reported.

By being incorporated in Liberia prior to the enactment of a 2004 tax law (retroactive to 2001) which repealed the tax exemption for non-resident corporations, the company was subject to prior law and a court ruled that they would continue to be exempt from Liberian income tax of 35%. The company had to pay up to 2% US income tax on international voyages that either start or ended in the US.

== Operations ==
As of November 2009, the company owned and operated a fleet of 47 vessels comprising 5 Capesize, 14 Kamsarmax, 21 Panamax, 2 Supramax, and 5 Handymax vessels with a total carrying capacity of approximately 3.9 million deadweight tonnage. 2 additional Capesize vessels will be delivered in 2010. The vessels are depreciated over a useful life of 28 years and calculated to have a scrap value of $200 per light weight ton. The current market value of such vessels is estimated by various reporting agencies.

In November 2007, a newbuild Capesize vessel sold for as much as $150M. In November 2009, newbuild Capes were delivered for as low as $59M and there were reports of prices as low as $45M.

Factors affecting net revenue included the global supply and demand for vessels captured by the BDI; fleet utilization rates; sales and scrappage of ships owned by the company. Chinese demand for iron ore and coal played an important role in overall dry bulk demand. The company had to rely upon their charters not to breaching their contracts. In February 2009, one charterer unilaterally decided to pay 50% of their contracted rate and other charterers tried to renegotiate their rates lower.
