= DryShips =

DryShips Inc.
- Company type: Private
- Industry: Shipping
- Founded: 2004
- Fate: Acquired by SPII Holdings
- Headquarters: Athens, Greece
- Key people: George Economou (CEO, Chairman)
- Website: http://www.dryships.com/

DryShips Inc is a dry bulk shipping company based in Athens, Greece. It is a Marshall Islands corporation, formed in 2004. On October 11, 2019, it was taken private by CEO and Chairman George Economou.

As of February 2019, the company is a diversified owner and operator of ocean going cargo vessels that operate worldwide. As of February 27, 2019, the company operates a fleet of 31 vessels: 6 Panamax drybulk vessels; 8 Newcastlemax drybulk vessels; 5 Kamsarmax drybulk vessels; 1 Very Large Crude Carrier; 3 Aframax tankers; 2 Suezmax tankers; and 6 Offshore Support Vessels, including 2 Platform Supply and 4 Oil Spill Recovery Vessels.

In March 2011, one of the company's Panamax carriers, MS Oliva, was wrecked off Nightingale Island in the Tristan da Cunha group of islands, resulting in an oil spill which damaged local wildlife.

In May 2014, Dryships finalized the buying of a cape-size bulk carrier. The company bought the ship, originally named Conches, which was built in 2011. The vessel was renamed Raiatea and officially changed hands on 24 April 2014 for a cost of approximately $53 million.

DryShips executed eight reverse stock splits between March 2016 and July 2017, shrinking 11.76 million shares to a single share, according to Seeking Alpha. Shortly before DryShips’ final reverse split, Mother Jones journalist Kevin Drum, citing figures from The Wall Street Journal, noted that DryShips investors had lost 99.99% of their investments between early November 2016 and mid-July 2017. Seven reverse splits had been executed at this point; a final reverse split, announced on July 19, 2017, caused the company's shares to lose another 51% of their value over the next three trading sessions.

While executing its reverse splits, DryShips also engaged in a stock-sale agreement with Kalani Investments, a company registered in the British Virgin Islands, which had the effect of more than negating the impact of its reverse splits. Between October 2016 and mid-July 2017, DryShips’ issuance and sale of new shares to Kalani effectively converted 10 million outstanding shares (as of October 2016) into the equivalent of 450 billion shares (as of mid-July 2017). In reality, DryShips only had 26 million net shares outstanding in mid-July 2017, but each share was the equivalent of 16,800 shares held before any reverse splits.

DryShips’ sale of newly issued shares provided it with as much as $400 million in new capital, with at least $226.4 million of this total coming from sales to Kalani between April and July 2017. DryShips used these funds to purchase additional ships for its fleet, increasing the number of operating ships to roughly 36. A series of deals made between DryShips and Kalani between November 11, 2016, and mid-July 2017 allowed Kalani to purchase securities convertible into an estimated $726 million of DryShips common shares.

In early 2017 the company refinanced its debt and announced an expansion into the gas carrier market with the purchase of a very large gas carrier.
