= Yiannis Carras =

Greek shipping magnate (1907–1989)

John Constantine Carras
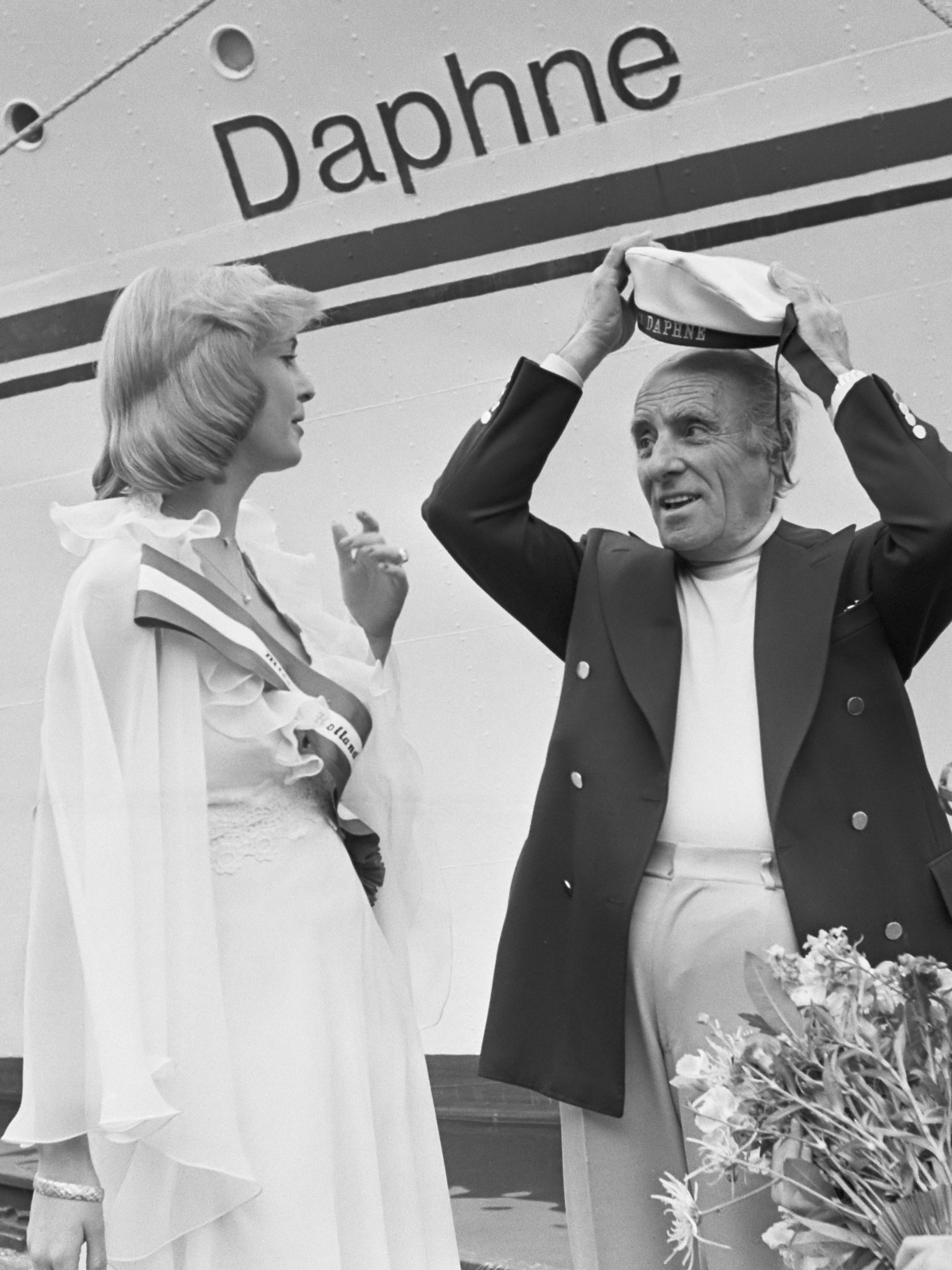
- In 1974-6 Carras converted two freighters into luxury cruise vessels – Daphne and Danae – at Chalkis Shipyard. They offered high-quality innovative cruises including the first-ever calls of western cruise ships to Communist China and Cuba.
- Born: Greece

John Constantine Carras (Greek: Γιάννης Καρράς; 1907–1989) was a Greek shipping magnate, grandson of captain and sailing-ship owner Ioannis I. Carras from Kardamyla of Chios.

== Early life ==
John Carras studied economics in Lausanne and subsequently became a principal in the London office of Angelos Lusi CBE.

== Career ==
After the Second World War John Carras received one of the 100 Liberty vessels allotted by the US to Greece. The company A. Lusi Ltd. was renamed to J.C. Carras Sons (Shipbrokers) Ltd. in 1955, which he founded with his father, Michael Carras, and subsequently took delivery of various newbuildings from British, Yugoslav and Japanese shipyards. Carras was the first shipowner in the world who ordered and took delivery of a Japanese ship built for export after the war. Delivery of the tanker Tini in 1952 ordered from Hitachi, marked the start of a huge influx of Greek business for Japan's nascent shipbuilding industry. In the late 1960s the fleet of the J. C. Carras group of companies attained its zenith, with 34 ships of an overall capacity of approximately 640,000 dwt. Carras initially controlled a mixed fleet of bulkers and tankers, which subsequently became alldry, including 11 Greek flagged capesizes and a number of panamaxes. During that time he was also involved in the real estate and tourist business and bought an extended area in Sithonia, Chalkidiki peninsula in northern Greece and in 1963 he started constructing a tourist resort, known as Porto Carras, which became one of the most famous holiday resorts in Greece.

Yiannis Carras died in 1989.
