= Panagia Gremniotissa =

Greek Orthodox church in Ios, Greece

- Παναγία η Γκρεμνιώτισσα
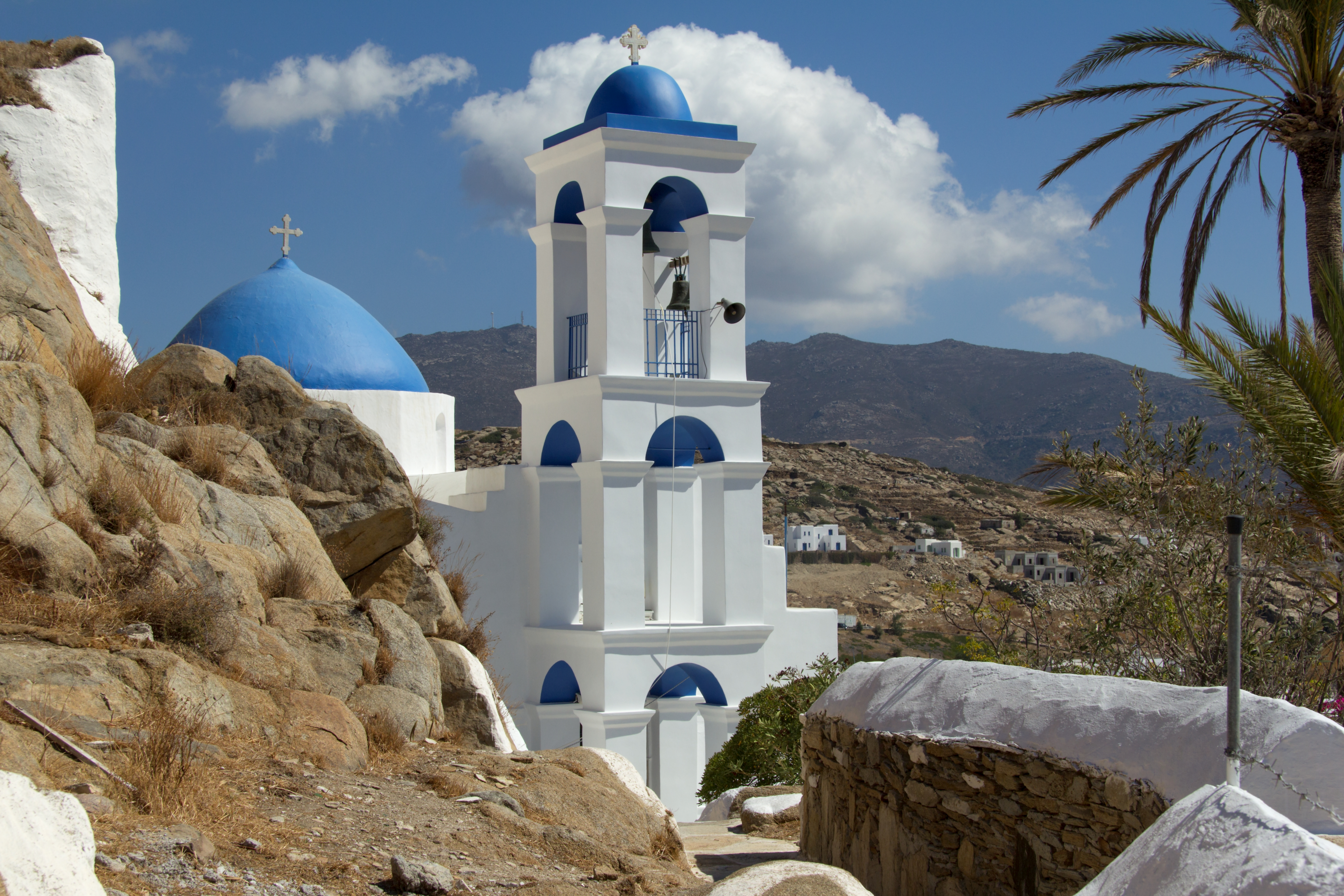
- The church in 2013

- Location of the church in Greece
- Panagia Gremniotissa
- 36°43′26″N 25°16′53″E
- Location: Ios, Chora, South Aegean
- Country: Greece
- Language: Greek
- Denomination: Greek Orthodox

History
- Status: Church
- Dedication: Panagia

Architecture
- Functional status: Active
- Architectural type: Church
- Style: Cyclades architecture
- Completed: 1797

Specifications
- Length: 20.52 m (67.3 ft)
- Width: 4.94 m (16.2 ft)
- Materials: Limestone

The Panagia Gremniotissa (Greek: Παναγία η Γκρεμνιώτισσα, lit. 'Virgin Mary of the Cliff'), also spelled as the Panagia Gremiotissa (Παναγία η Γκρεμιώτισσα), is a Greek Orthodox church in Ios, on the island of Ios, in the South Aegean region of Greece.

== Legend ==
According to the legend, during the Ottoman occupation of Greece, some people in Crete, afraid of the Ottomans wanting to protect their religion and its symbols, put a religious image of Panagia in a wooden raft with a candle on it with hopes that someone will find it and rescue the image. Later on, a night-shepherd noticed a light in Milopota's beach and found the raft and the image. Then, they took it and gave it to the church of Saint Nikolas. The next morning, according to the legend, the image mysteriously moved to the church of Saint Eleftherios in Palaiokastro. After the phenomenon was repeated three times, convinced by her miracles, the locals decided to build a church for the image, but every time they started building they found the bricks next to the Church of Saint Eleftherios. After that, the people of Ios decided to build the church in a place where Crete is visible, and people of all ages from all over the island got together and started building the church.

== Name ==
The church, due to its high altitude at 150 metres (490 ft) above sea level, almost on the top of Chora's cliff, has the name Gremniotissa with means 'of the cliff', and Panagia is the patron saint. Altogether, the church's name literally means "Virgin Mary of the Cliff".

== See also ==
- Church of Greece
- List of churches in Greece
