= Psathonisi, Ios =

Island in Greece

Psathonisi
Native name: Ψαθονήσι
- Interactive map of Psathonisi

Geography
- Location: Aegean Islands
- Coordinates: 36°44′57″N 25°21′50″E
- Area: 0.058 km^{2} (0.022 sq mi)
- Length: 1.06 km (0.659 mi)
- Highest elevation: 53 m (174 ft)

Administration
- Greece
- Administrative region: South Aegean
- Regional unit: Thira
- Municipality: Ios

Demographics
- Population: 0 (2011)

Additional information
- Time zone: EET (UTC+2)
  - Summer (DST): EEST (UTC+3)

Psathonisi (Greek: Ψαθονήσι) is a small uninhabited island near the castle of Palaiokastro in Ios, Greece. The island is about 50 meters from the main island.

It has no beaches because it is very steep with maximum elevations of 53 meters and mainly made out of slate and rocks. The name derives from the nearby village Psathi.

The island has no trees but some small bushes just like the neighbouring island of Ios. Also, it hosts some wild flowers and a lot of cotton thistles.

The island is considered an archaeological site, since it houses the remains of a protocyclatic settlement.
