= Tripodes =

Tripodes Τρίποδες
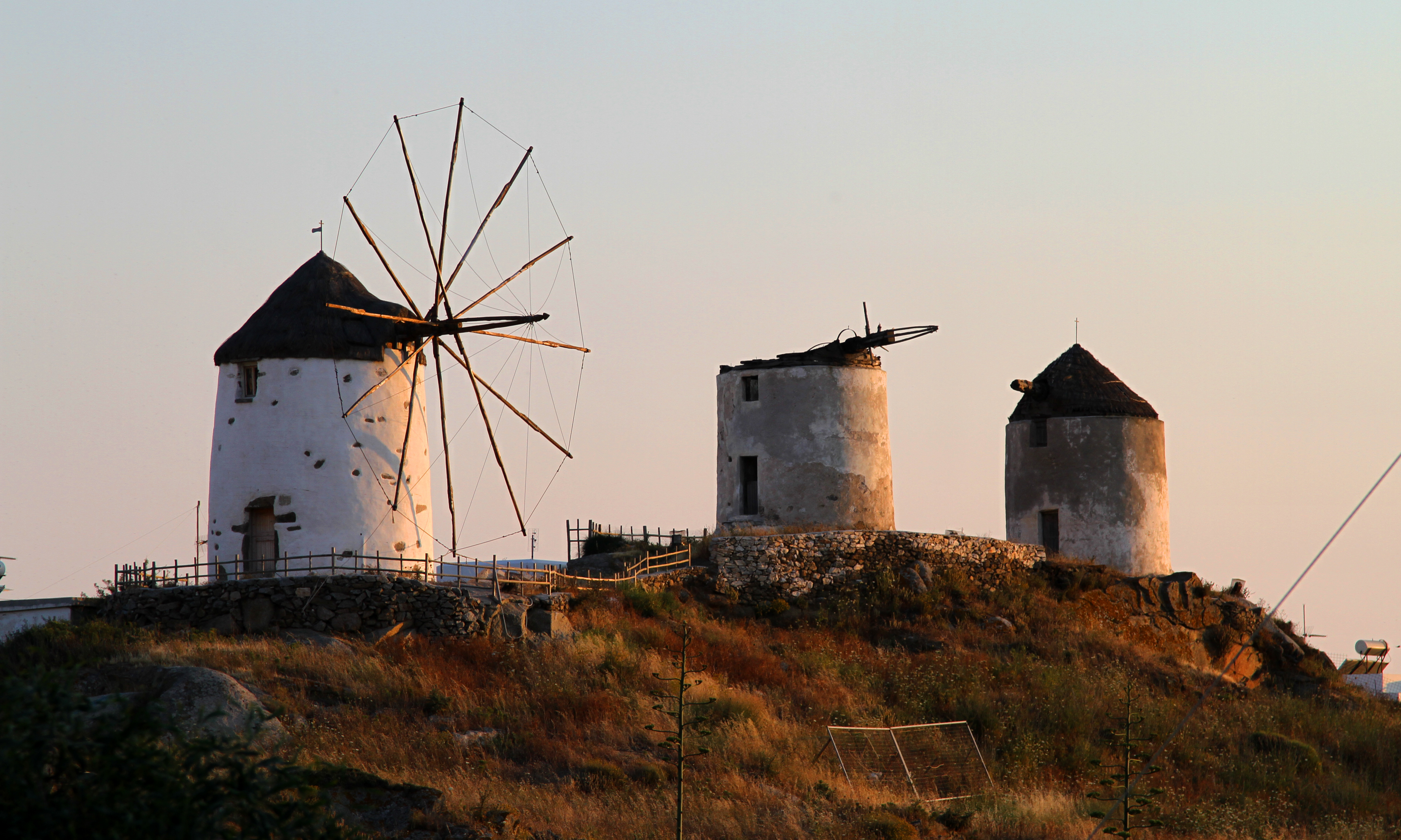
- Interactive map of Tripodes

Population
  - Total: More than 800

Tripodes or Vivlos (Greek: Τρίποδες) is one of the largest villages located in southwestern Naxos. It is situated on the southwest beach road of the island, about 8 km from Chora and Plaka beach. The streets of the village are paved and narrow. The village has a population of over 800 permanent residents, making it one of the more populous villages in Naxos.

== History ==
The inhabitants of Tripodes were once forced to relocate due to threats from Aegean Sea pirates. Today, Tripodes is one of the most populous villages in Naxos, with a resident population exceeding 800. The village is known for its paved streets and windmills. Its economy benefits from the fertile plains of Plaka, which support the cultivation of Naxos potatoes, vegetables, barley, and vines.

== Places ==
- Parish Church of Panagia Tripodiotissa,
- Several traditional windmills
- Plaka Tower (also known as ''Paleopyrgos'' or "Ariadne's Tower")
- Folklore Museum

== Festival ==
A major celebration in honor of Panagia (the Virgin Mary) takes place on August 23, attracting people from across the village.
