= Lavalette =

Lavalette may refer to:

== Places ==
- Lavalette (Aude), France
- Lavalette, Hérault, France
- Lavalette (Haute-Garonne), France
- Lavallette, New Jersey, United States
- Lavalette, West Virginia, United States

== People with the surname ==
- Antoine Marie Chamans, comte de Lavalette (1769–1830), French politician under Napoléon
- Bernard Lavalette (1926–2019), French actor
- Jean-Baptiste de Lavalette (1753–1794), French politician and general
- Laure Lavalette (born 1976), French lawyer and politician

== See also ==
- La Valette
- Valette (disambiguation)
- Valletta
