= Church of Saint Irene, Ios =

Church on the island of Ios, Greece

Church of Saint Irene
- Αγία Ειρήνη
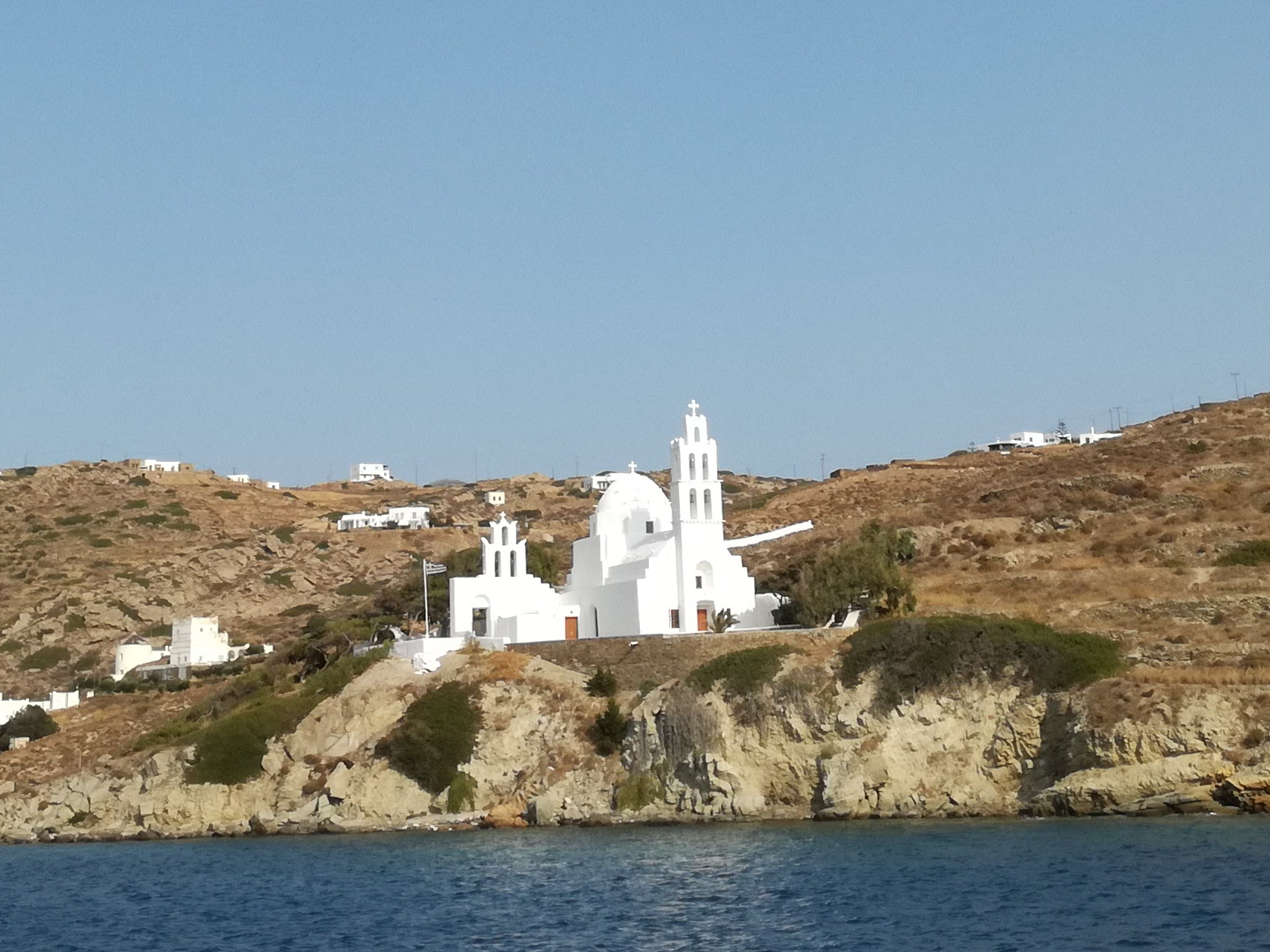
- The church in 2017, viewed from the South Aegean sea

- Location of the church in Greece
- Church of Saint Irene
- 36°43′17″N 25°16′12″E
- Location: Ios Island, Cyclades, South Aegean
- Country: Greece
- Language: Greek
- Denomination: Greek Orthodox

History
- Status: Church
- Dedication: Saint Irene

Architecture
- Functional status: Active
- Architectural type: Church
- Style: Cyclades
- Completed: 17th century

Specifications
- Materials: Limestone

The Church of St. Irene (Greek: Αγία Ειρήνη) is a Greek Orthodox church on the island of Ios, in the Cyclades, in the South Aegean region of Greece. It is located in the south side of the port of Ios in Yialos and it was built in the 17th century.

== Architecture ==
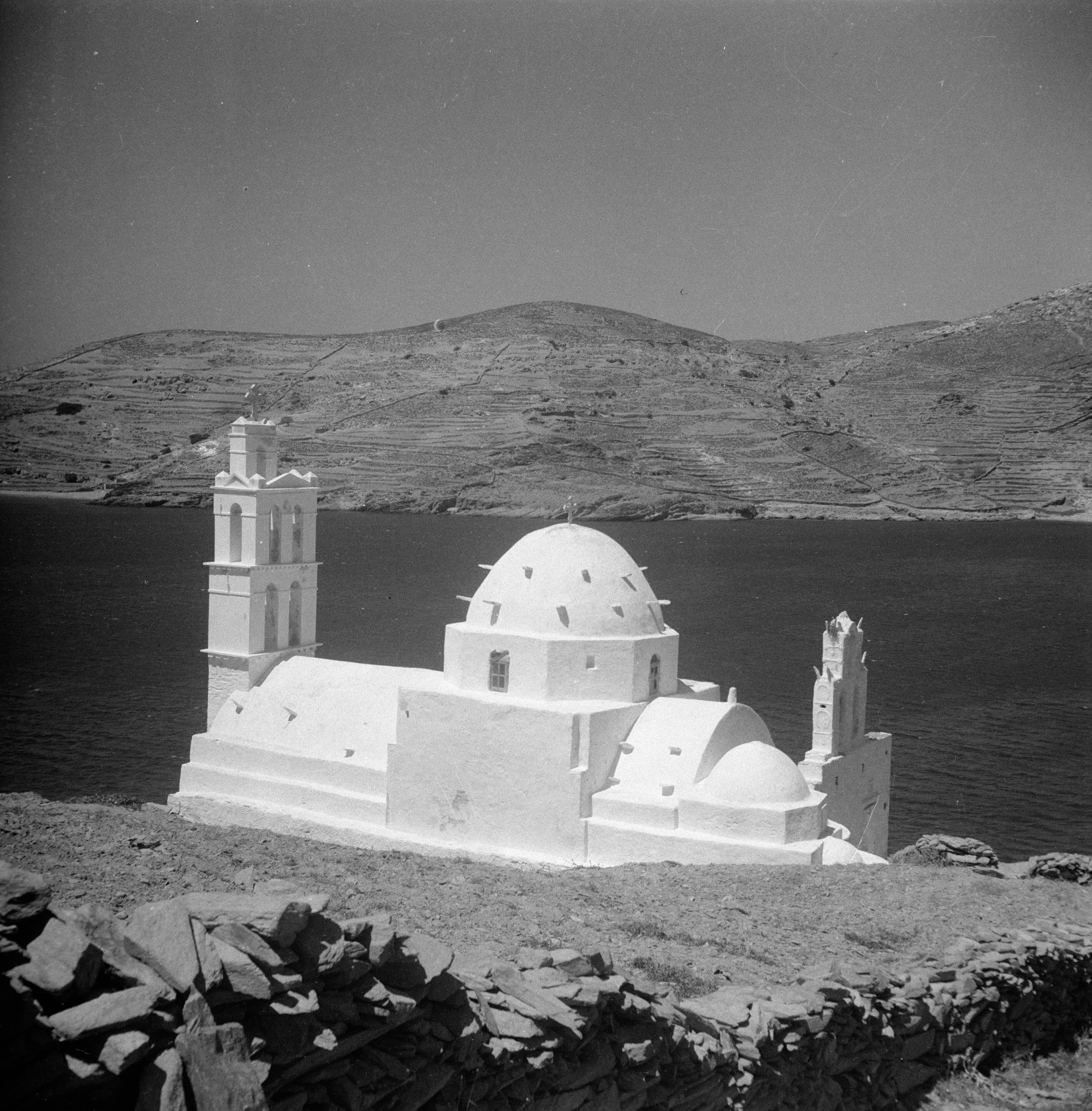
The church with the sea in background, by Göran Schildt.

The church has two bell towers. One over the entrance in the church and another one over the gate with seven and three bells respectively.

Very close to the church, under a tree lies a mysterious 17th–18th century grave with engraved square and compasses symbol and a skull and bones symbol. The writing on it is altered and it is not readable. It's not known to who the grave belongs to but it is assumed that it is of a pirate.

== See also ==
- Church of Greece
- List of churches in Greece
