= Agia Theodoti =

Agia Theodoti Αγία Θεοδότη
- Village
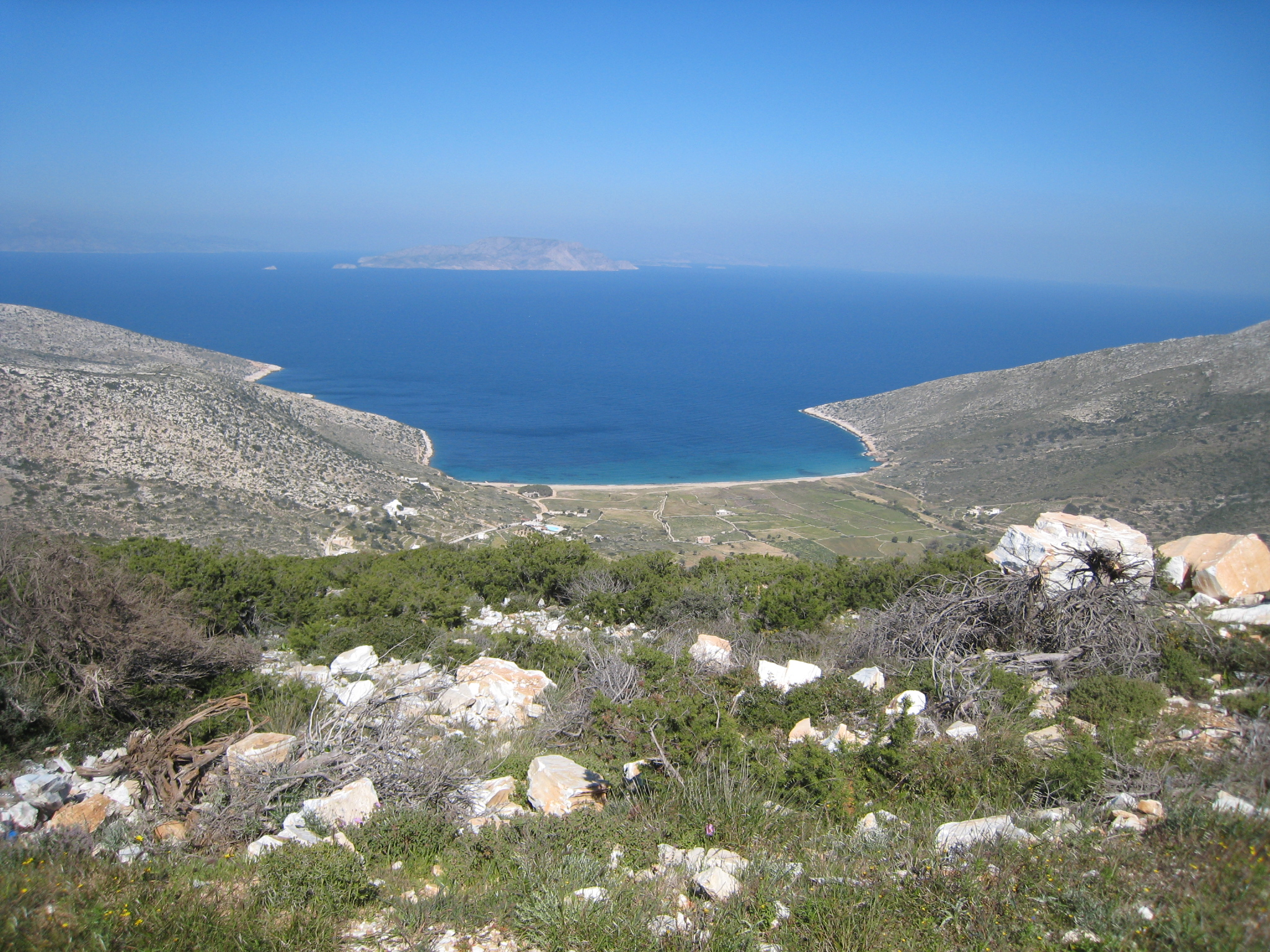
- Interactive map of Agia Theodoti
- Coordinates: 36°45′10″N 25°19′25″E
- Country: Greece
- Regions of Greece: South Aegean
- Regional units of Greece: Thira

Area
  - Total: 1.3 km^{2} (0.50 sq mi)
- Elevation: 21 m (69 ft)

Population (2011)
  - Total: 12
  - Density: 9.2/km^{2} (24/sq mi)
- Demonym: Agiotheótis (Αγιοθεοδότης)
- Time zone: UTC+2:00 (EET)
  - Summer (DST): UTC+3:00 (EEST)
- Postal code: 840 01

Agia Theodoti (Greek: Αγία Θεοδότη) is a settlement on the island of Ios in the regional unit of Thira, in Greece's South Aegean region, according to the Kallikratis reform. Prior to the Kallikratis and the Kapodistrias reforms, it belonged to the province of Thira in the prefecture of Cyclades, in the geographical group of Aegean Islands.

It is a seaside settlement at an altitude of twenty meters.
