= Skarkos =

Bronze Age settlement on Ios, Greece

Coordinates: 36.7318°N 25.2828°E

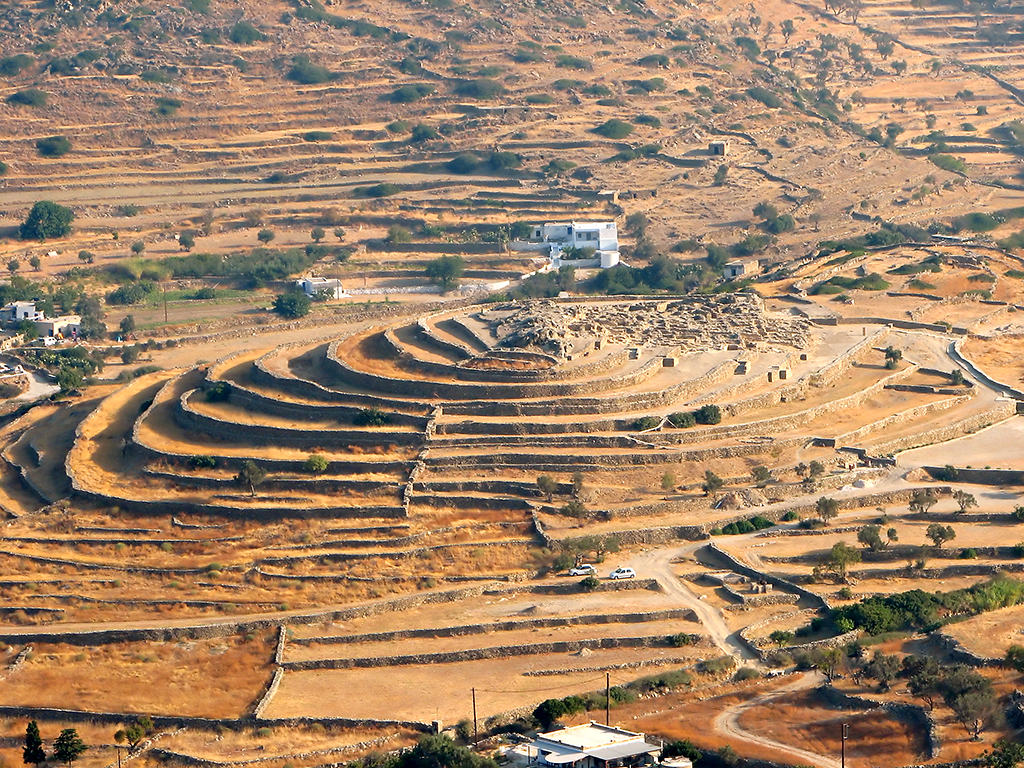
Early prehistoric Cycladic settlement on Skarkos hill on Ios Island, Greece, as seen from the top of the hill in Chora

Skarkos (Greek: Σκάρκος) is an early Bronze Age settlement on the island of Ios in Greece. Owing to its well preserved state, Skarkos is one of the most important prehistoric sites in the Aegean and especially the Cyclades.

== Geography ==
Ios, with one of the most sheltered natural harbours in the Cyclades, is located at the crossroads of Cycladic maritime routes. The settlement of Skarkos is situated on a hill near the west coast of Ios, just outside the main town (Chora).

== Excavations ==
Skarkos was systematically excavated during the years 1984-1997. The excavations have been carried out in the north and east sides of the hill. They have brought to light an important early Cycladic settlement (mid-3rd millennium BC) in an exceptionally good state of preservation (two-storey buildings, four-metre-high walls), and an overlying late middle/early late Bronze Age cemetery (mid-2nd millennium BC). The settlement covers an area of 1.1 hectares and is the largest and best preserved site of the Keros-Syros culture, estimated to have been home to between 200 and 300 people.

== Architecture ==
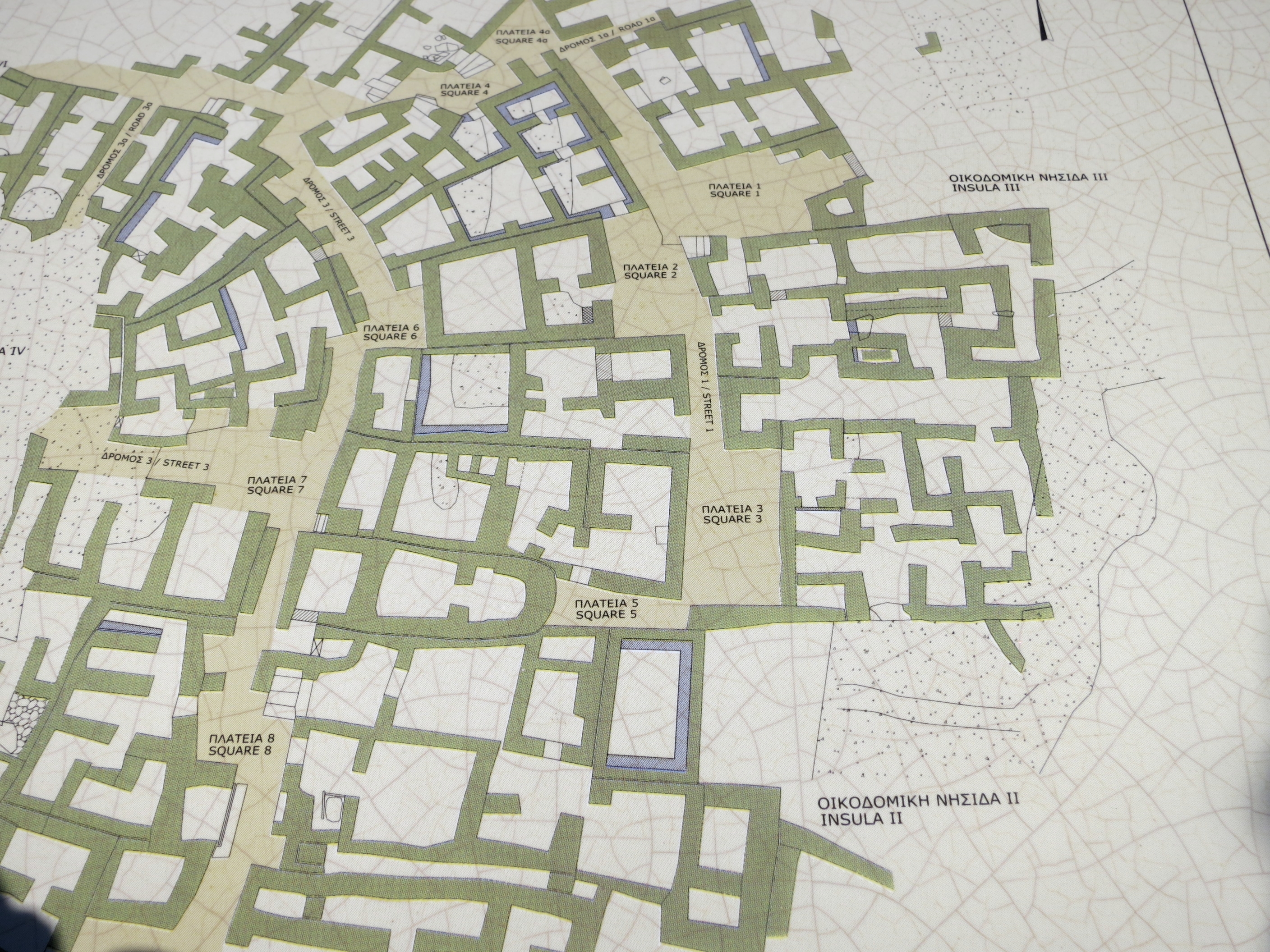
Early Cycladic settlement Skarkos on the island of Ios. Early Bronze Age, EC II, 2800 to 2300 BC. Map of the town

Skarkos is built on terraces that follow the natural relief of the hill. Its rectangular, stone-built residential buildings consist of a ground floor, a first floor and an enclosed courtyard. Their varying sizes reveal a social differentiation in the community. Streets between one and two meters wide and public spaces were uncovered. Walls are preserved to a height of three to four meters. The urban planning system of Skarkos is comparable to that of Poliochne on Lemnos from the beginning of the 3rd millennium BC. Archaeological evidence suggests that the ground floor was used for food preparation whereas the first floor served as living room, storage area for pottery and other goods and occasionally as workshop.

== Findings ==
Excavations have unearthed several small artifacts such as marble figurines, obsidian ware, seals, ceramics, marble and stone vessels, tools, animal bones and seashells. Numerous pithoi from 1 to 1.30 in height were used for the storage of agricultural goods. Smaller amphorae were used to transport liquids. Clay seals on pottery indicate the control of agricultural production and the organization of the distribution of goods. Several of these findings are now on display at the archaeological museum in Chora.

== Conservation ==
The site of Skarkos became publicly accessible after extensive conservation works between 2002 – 2007. The project was awarded the 2008 EU Prize for Cultural Heritage / Europa Nostra Top Prize for Conservation, for the outstanding quality of conservation work and above all the minimal and extremely sensitive character of the interventions, having no detrimental impact on a unique landscape.

== See also ==
- History of the Cyclades
- Phylakopi
- Poliochne
- Cycladic art

== Gallery ==
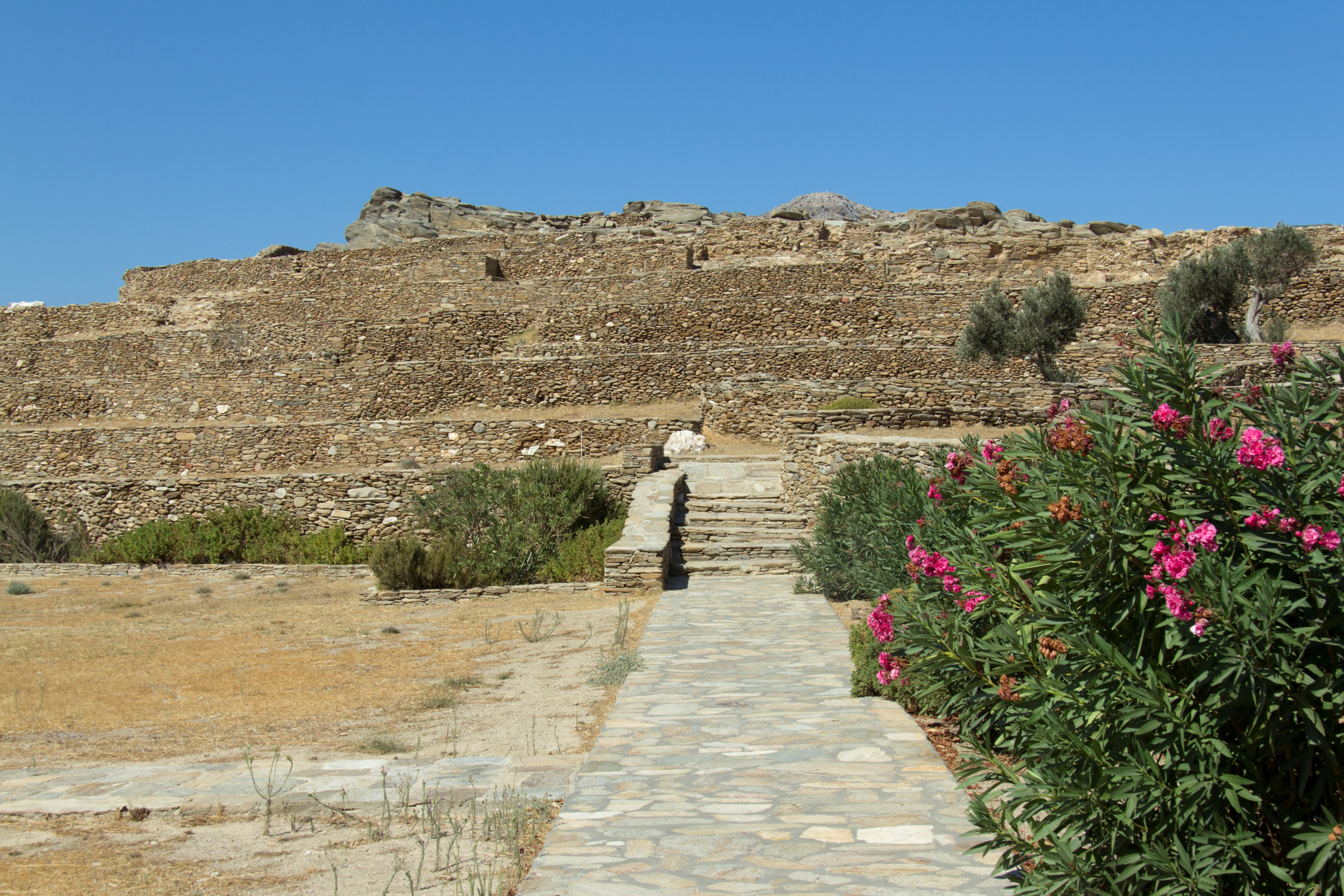

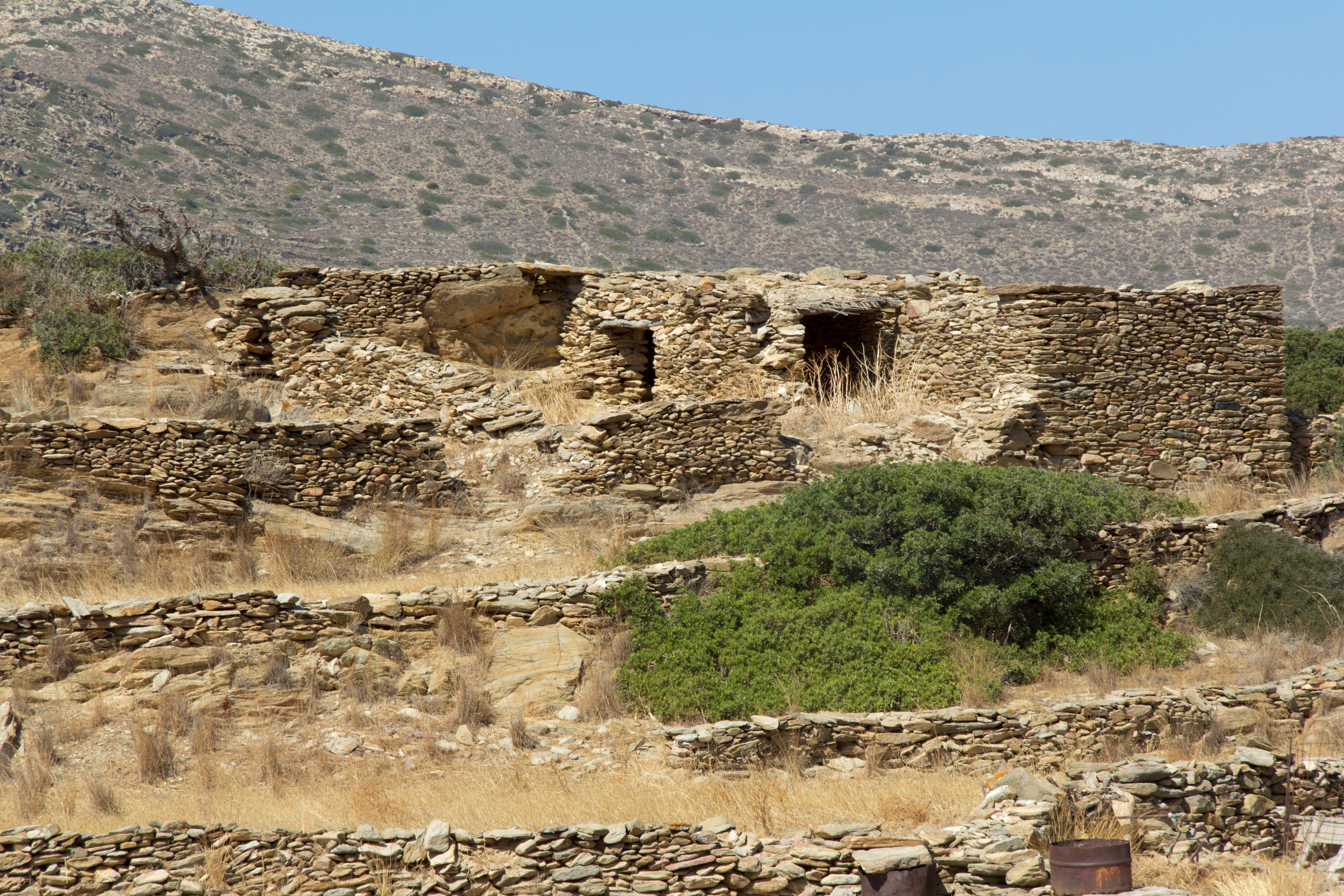

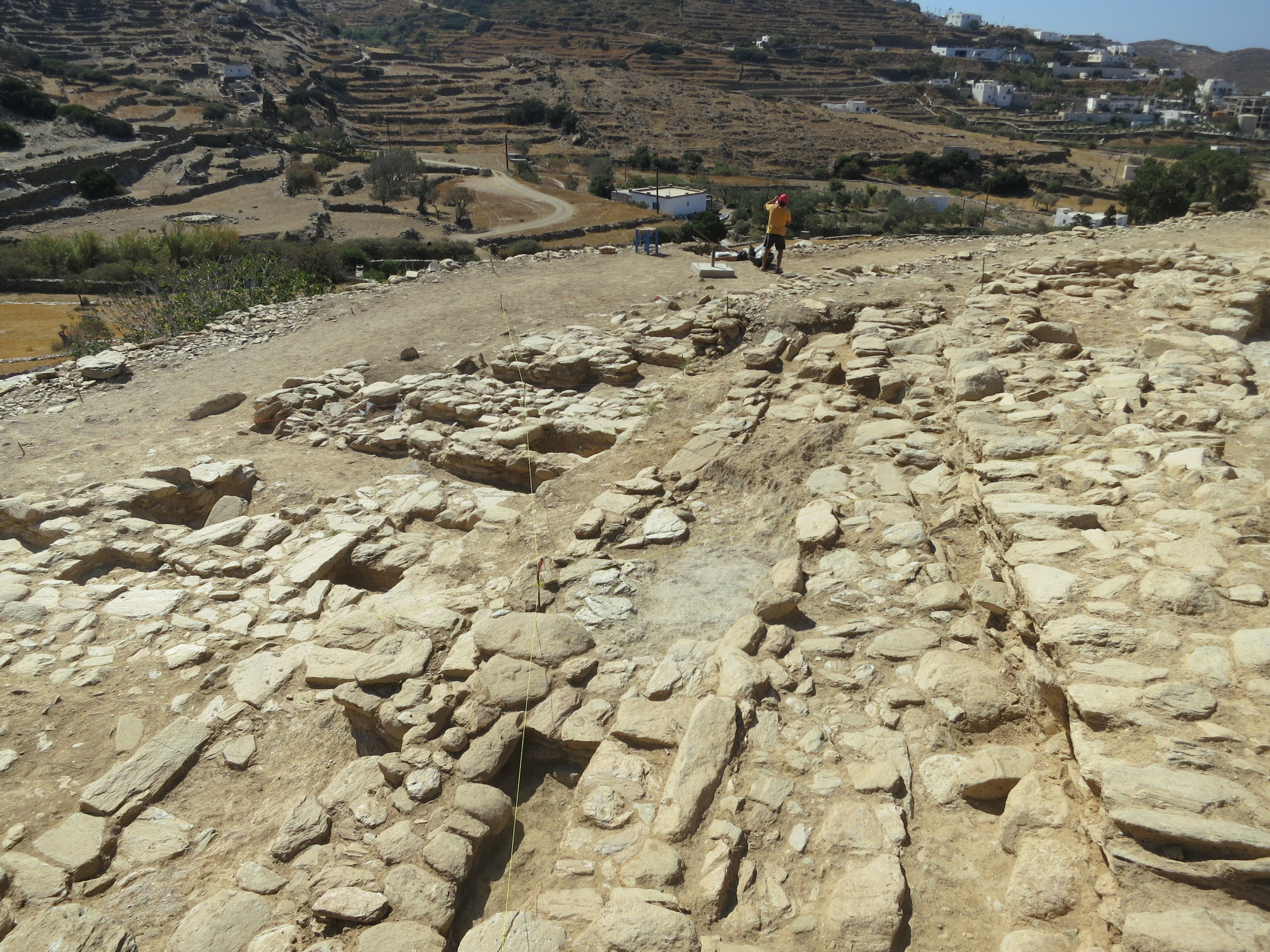

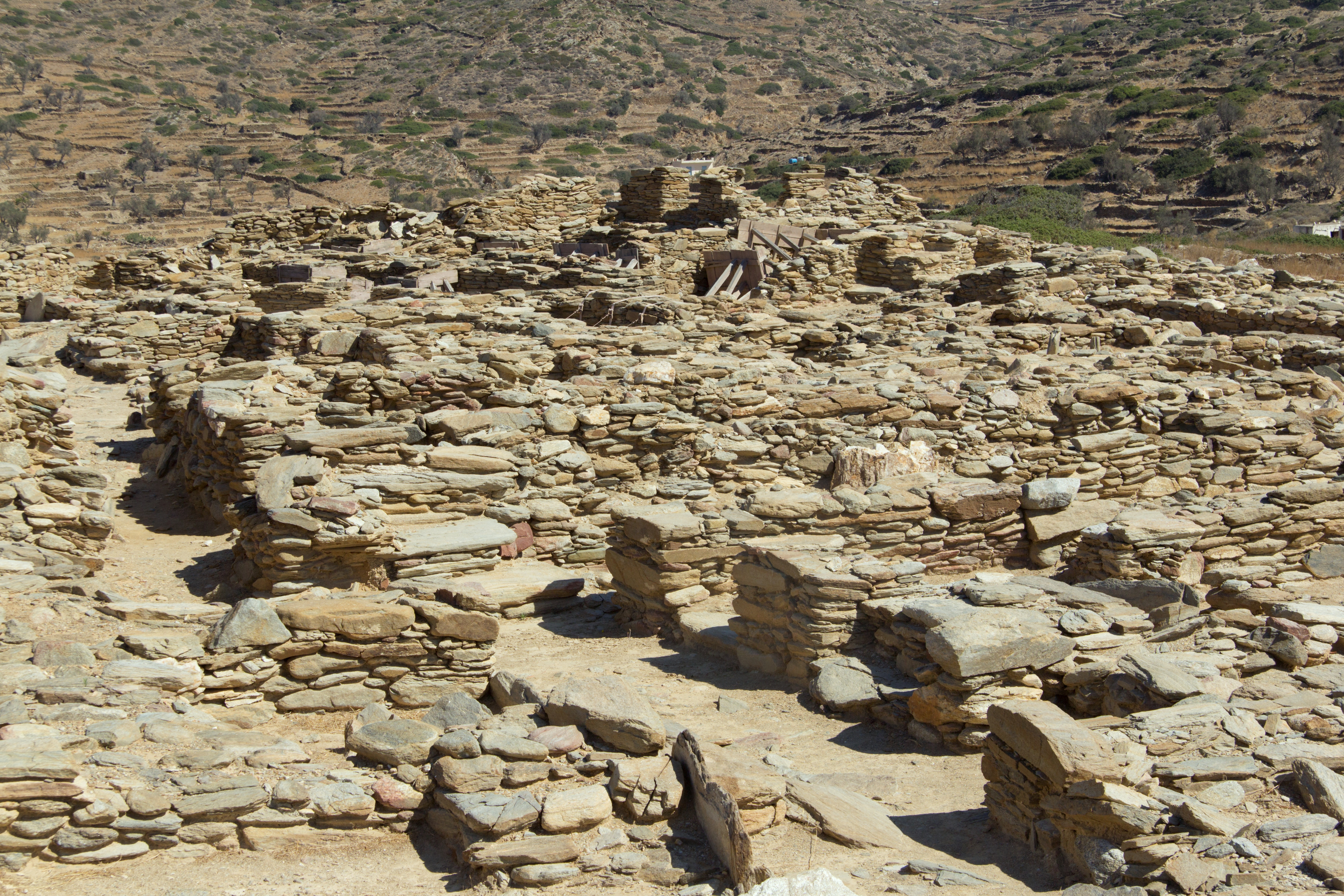
