= Mylopotas =

Settlement in Ios, Greece

Mylopotas Μυλοπότας
- Settlement
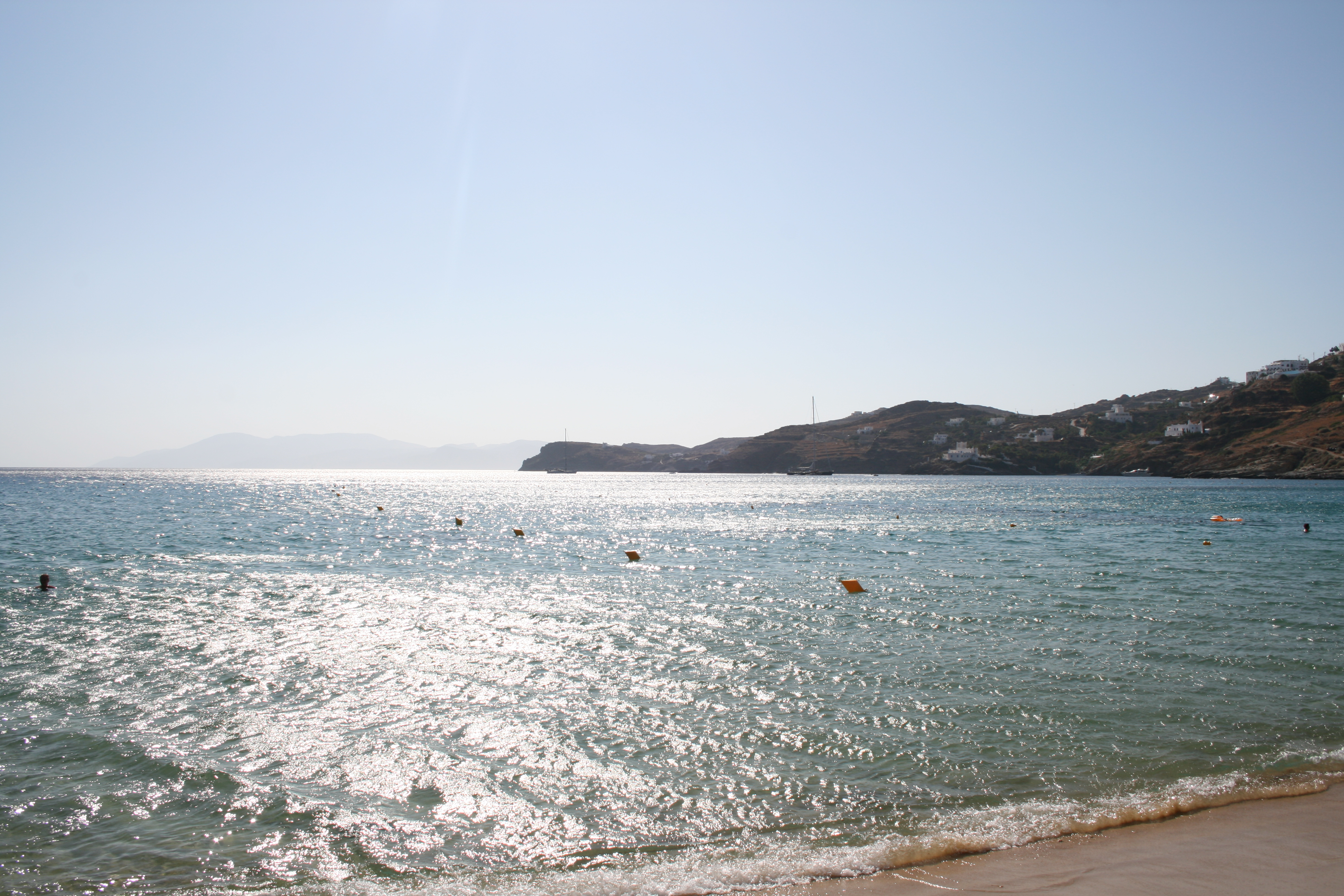
- Mylopotas beach

- Location within Greece
- Coordinates: 36°42′49″N 25°17′41″E
- Country: Greece
- Administrative region: South Aegean
- Regional unit: Thira
- Municipality: Ios

Area
  - Total: 0.6 km^{2} (0.23 sq mi)

Population (2021)
  - Total: 151
  - Density: 250/km^{2} (650/sq mi)
- Demonym: Mylopotianós (Μυλοποτιανός)
- Time zone: UTC+2 (EET)
  - Summer (DST): UTC+3 (EEST)
- Postal code: 840 01
- Area code: 22860

Mylopotas (Greek: Μυλοπότας) is a small settlement located on the Greek island of Ios. Although the population of Mylopotas is just 151 people (2021), during the summer season many tourists visit Mylopotas to enjoy the beach and stay in one of the resorts nearby. Also in Mylopotas there are many night clubs and a lot of young tourists pass their time there.

== Name ==
The name of Mylopotas comes from a stream with the same name. This stream runs through Mylopotas, and its name literally means the river (potas<potamos) of the mills (mylo<myls), because the stream starts from the Mills of Chora. In older references and in Katharevousa, the settlement is called Mylopotamos.

== Beach of Mylopotas ==
The beach of Mylopotas is the largest in area and length beach of Ios island. It is an organized beach and it is less than 40 meters away from Mylopotas' restaurants and cafeterias.
