= Achlades Peninsula =

Peninsula in Ios, Greece

Coordinates: 36°38′32″N 25°21′22″E

Achlades Peninsula is the southernmost tip of the island of Ios of Cyclades. Almost just to the south, 18 km (9.7 nautical miles) from Achlades is Cape Mavropetra, the northernmost point of the island of Santorini.
