= Odysseas Elytis Theatre =

Open-air theater in Greece

- Θέατρο Οδυσσέα Ελύτη
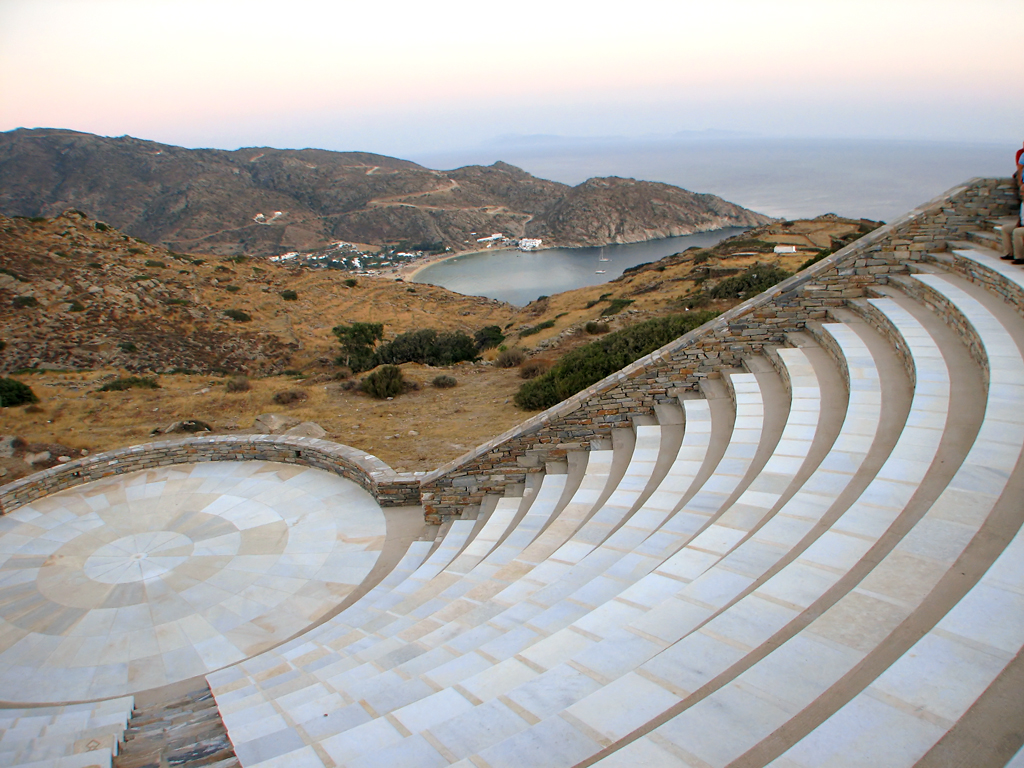
- Location: Ios island
- Coordinates: 36°43′21″N 25°17′18″E
- Owner: Municipality of Ios
- Capacity: 1000

Construction
- Built: 1997
- Architect: Peter Haupt

The Odysseas Elytis Theater in Ios, Greece is an open-air theater of the ancient Greek style designed by the architect Peter Haupt, a professor of architecture at the University of Berlin.

== Architecture ==
The Odysseas Elytis Theatre was modelled on ancient theatres of Greece and Magna Graecia.

The Theatre can accommodate 1,100 spectators in its stands, which are made out of marble.

For rest of the building of the theatre, local stone was used. The stage has a diameter of 12 meters. The seats are oriented toward the south offering a view of the Aegean and protecting the spectators from the summer winds.

== Name ==
The theatre is named after the Greek poet Odysseas Elytis. The name Odysseas is the modern Greek version of the name Odysseus, the protagonist of Homer's Odyssey. Homer is closely associated with the island given the fact that according to all sources he died on the island.

== Events ==
The Municipality of Ios, in cooperation with the local touristic Development Company, organizes annually concerts with great Greek and foreign artists at the Theatre.

In honor of Homer who died on the island, a cultural festival named ΟΜΗΡΕΙΑ ("OMIRIA"(from ΟΜΗΡ(ΟΣ) - HOMER + ΕΙΑ) is organized every year with artistic and cultural activities.

At the annual "OMIREA" cultural events that take place on May to September, anyone can attend a series of events such as the theatre competition of Cycladic schools, athletic and group sports, exhibitions of art, photography and books in the hall of the City Hall building.
