= Valette =

Valette may refer to:

== People ==
- Aline Valette (1850–1899), French feminist and socialist
- Craig Valette (born 1982), Canadian ice hockey player
- Fanny Valette (born 1986), French actress
- Jean Valette
- Jean Parisot de Valette (1495–1568), French nobleman and 49th Grand Master of the Order of Malta
- Michel Valette (1928–2016), French actor and writer
- Pierre Adolphe Valette (1876–1942), French Impressionist painter
- Spyridon Valettas (1779-1843), Greek politician

== Other uses ==
- Valette, Cantal, a commune in the Cantal department in south-central France
- Oral contraceptive produced by Jenapharm containing ethinylestradiol and dienogest
