= Spyridon Valettas =

Greek politician (1779–1843)

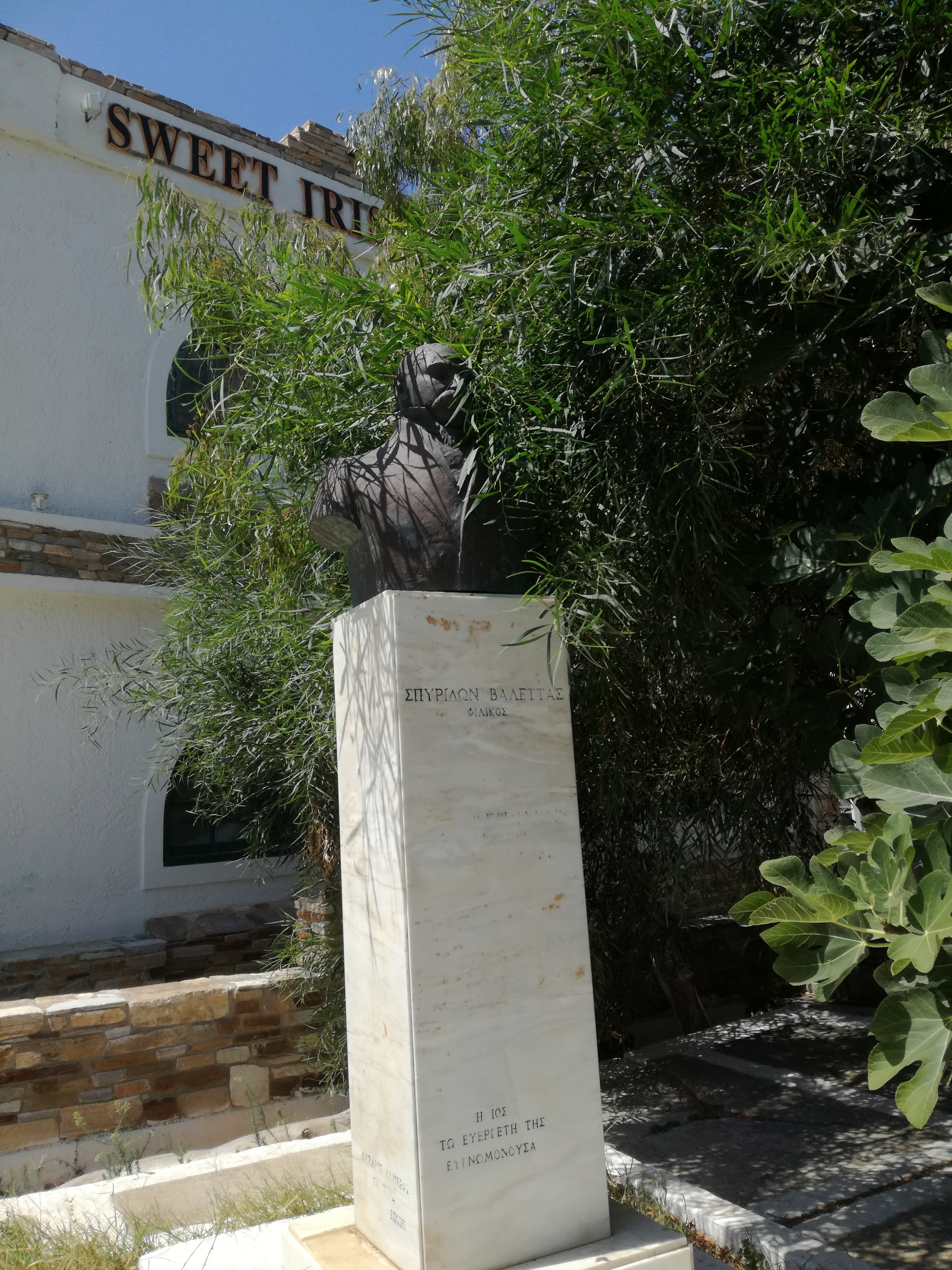
- Bust of Spyridon Valetas in Chora, Ios

Secretary of the Prince of Wallachia
- In office 17 November 1818 – 19 January 1821

Minister of Education and Religious Affairs of Greece
- In office 6 July 1841 – 22 August 1841
- Monarch: Otto
- Prime Minister: Alexandros Mavrokordatos
- Succeeded by: Dimitrios Christidis as Secretary of Education, Religious, Monarch and Foreign Affairs

Personal details
- Born: 1779 Chora, Ios
- Died: 11 June 1843 (aged 63–64) Athens
- Spouse: Aikaterini Soutsou
- Children: 6
- Parent: Ioannis Logiotatos Valettas (father)
- Known for: Member of Filiki Eteria

Spyridon Valettas (1779 – 11 June 1843) was a Greek scholar, a member of the Filiki Eteria and for a short time the first minister of education and ecclesiastical affairs in the short-lived government of Alexandros Mavrokordatos in 1841.

== Biography ==
He was born in Chora in Ios island and came from a noble family. He was trained initially in Ios and later in Patmos, Sifnos and Constantinople. From 1818 he served in Bucharest as the secretary of the ruler Alexandros Soutsos. He translated many works, some by using a pseudonym. In 1818 he was also introduced to the Filiki Eteria. In 1821 he moved to Transylvania, where he stayed until 1827. From 1827 until 1829 he stayed in Rijeka. In October 1829 he left for Greece, where he arrived in November. He went to Hydra at the assembly against Kapodistrias in August 1831 and in July 1832 he represented Ios to the Fifth National Assembly, as mentioned in the Greek Government Gazette. In 1833 he is in Athens. He translated many literary and political works. He took part in the Government of Mavrocordatos as Minister of Public Education and Ecclesiastics affairs from 24 June to 11 August 1841. He died on 11 June 1843, leaving his fortune to public educational institutions.

== Sources ==
Triadafillos, Sklavenitis (1994). "Η Επανάσταση του 1821. Αφιέρωμα στη μνήμη της Δέσποινας Θεμελή - Κατηφόρη" [The Revolution of 1821. Tribute in memory of Despina Themeli]. Μνήμων (in Greek). 9. Athens: Εταιρεία Μελέτης Νέου Ελληνισμού: 107. hdl:10442/4244.
