= Palaiokastro, Ios =

Palaiokastro
- Παλαιόκαστρο
- Greece
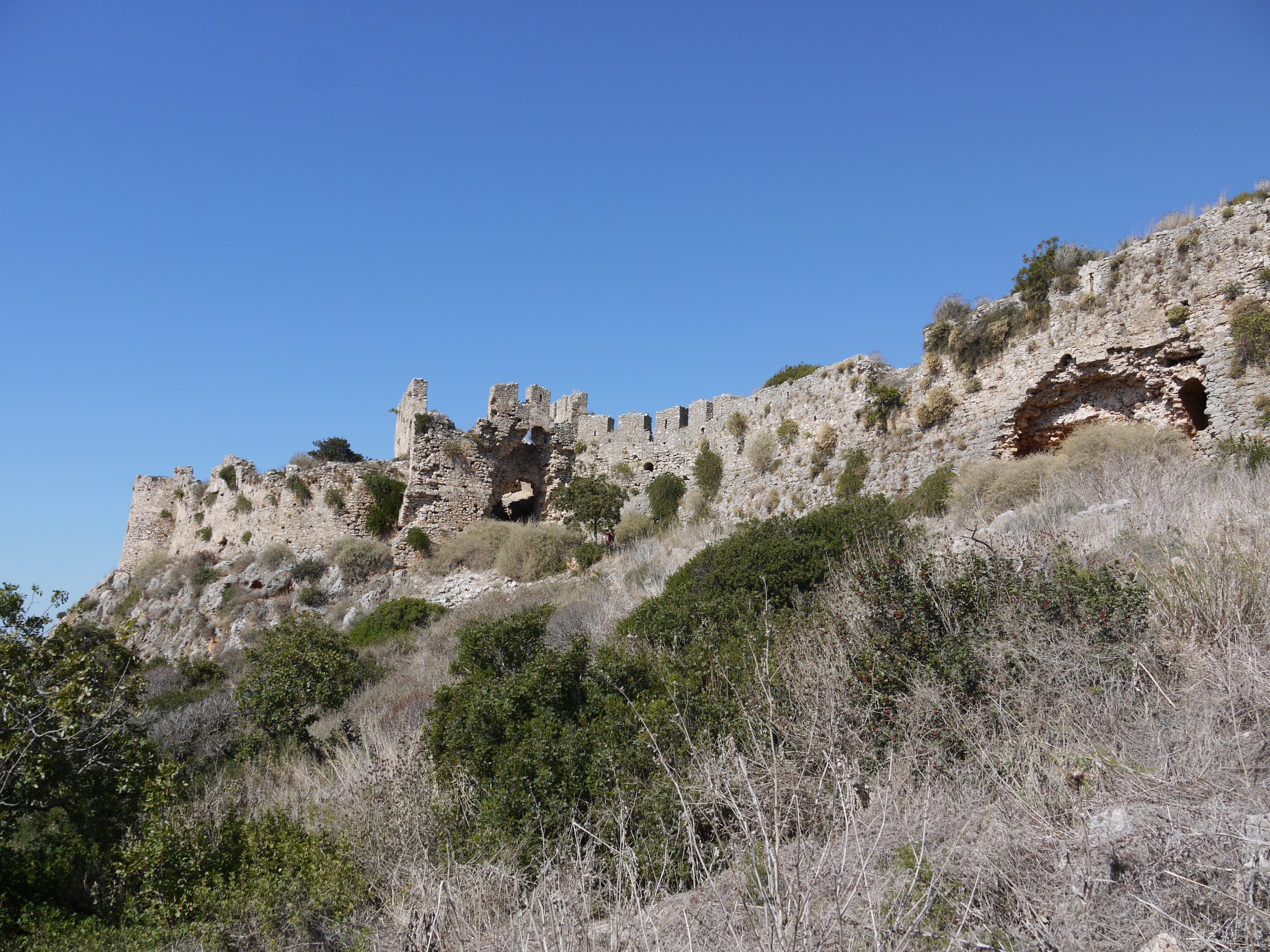

Site information
- Condition: Ruined

Location
- Coordinates: 36°44′44″N 25°20′40″E

Site history
- Built: 1397
- Materials: Stone

Palaiokastro (Greek: Παλαιόκαστρο, Greek pronunciation: [paleokaztr̥o], "old castle") is a castle built in the eastern part of the Aegean island of Ios, 17 km from Chora. Today, the ruins left are parts of the walls and ruins of its internal buildings. Inside the walls there is now the small Church of Panagia Paleokastritsa.

The castle was built in 1397 by the Duke of Naxos, Francesco I Crispo, based on an older Byzantine castle that existed in the area. The structure lies on the top of a hill at an altitude of 275 m.
