= Ios =

Greek island in the Aegean Sea

Ios Ίος, Νιός
- Municipality
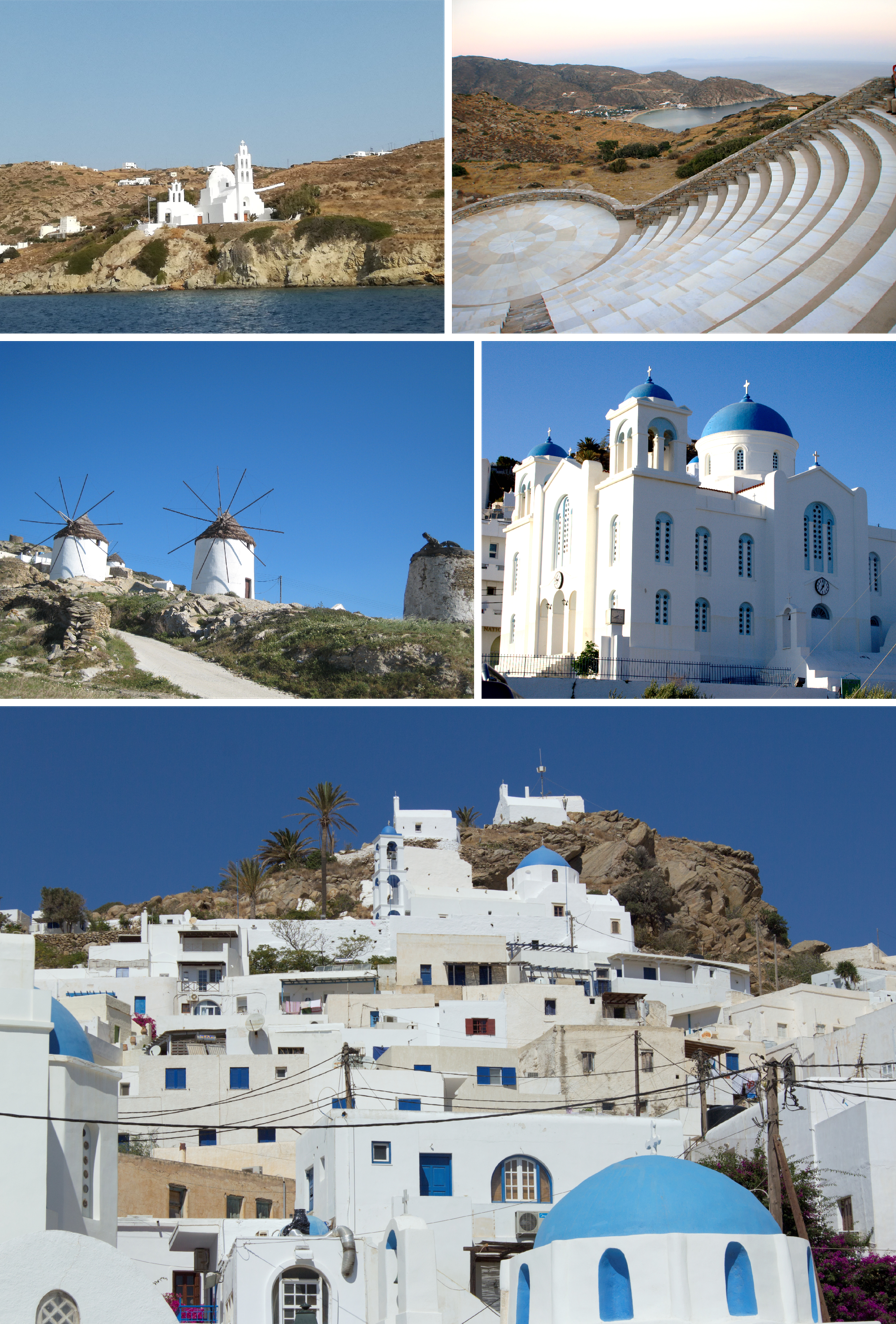
- Clockwise from top: Church of Saint Irene, Odysseas Elytis Theatre, Cathedral Church Of Ios, Chora Hill, Windmills in Chora

- Seal

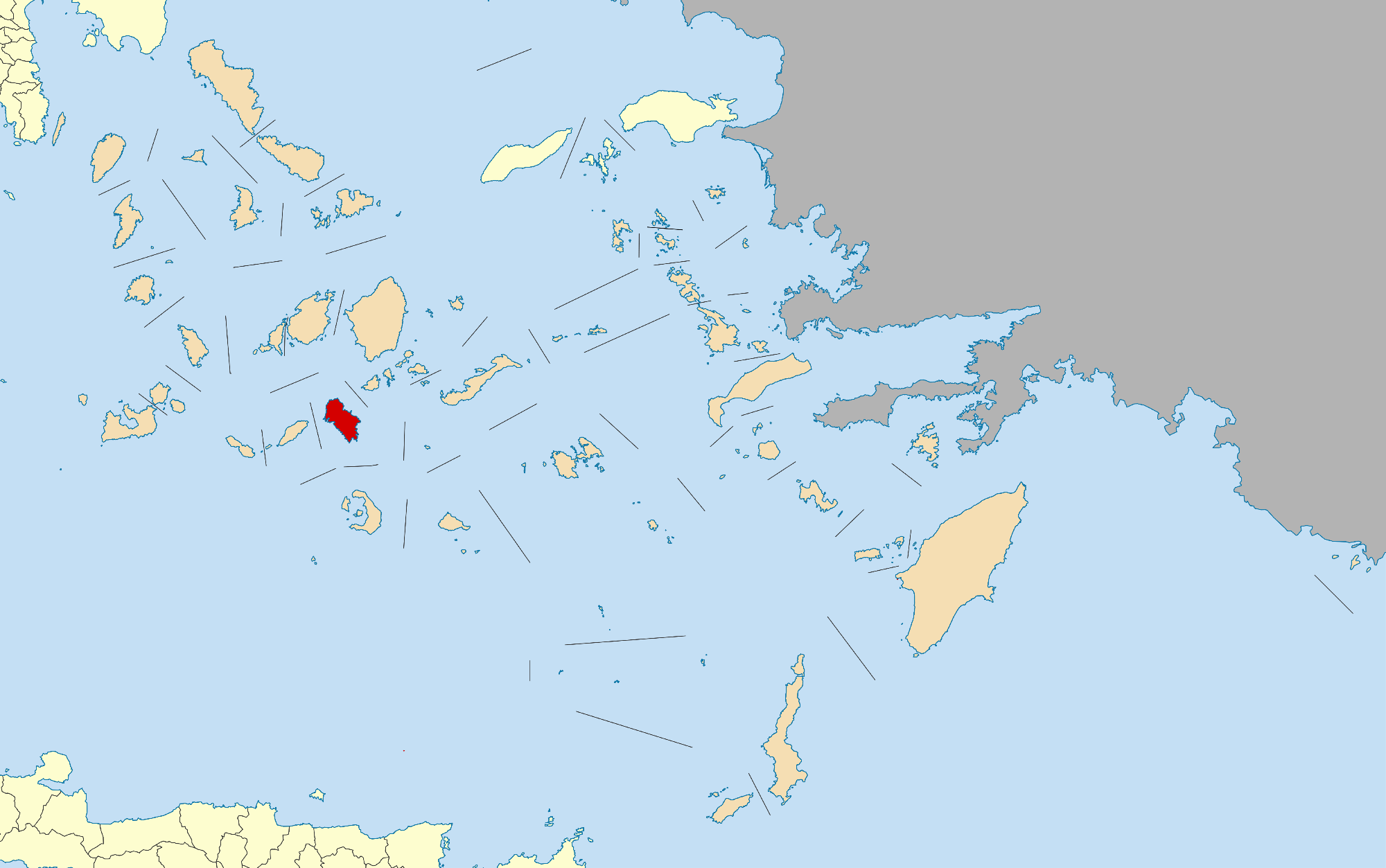

- Location within Greece
- Coordinates: 36°43′0″N 25°20′11″E
- Country: Greece
- Administrative region: South Aegean
- Regional unit: Thira
- Municipality established: 1835
- Seat: Chora

Government
  - Mayor: Gkikas Gkikas

Area
  - Municipality: 109.0 km^{2} (42.1 sq mi)
- Highest elevation: 713 m (2,339 ft)
- Lowest elevation: 0 m (0 ft)

Population (2021)
  - Municipality: 2,299
  - Density: 21.09/km^{2} (54.63/sq mi)
- Demonym(s): Ιήτης (Iitis) (official); Ιέτης (Ietis) (Ancient Alternative); Νιώτης (Niotis) (local); Iitian or Ietian (anglicised)
- Time zone: UTC+2 (EET)
  - Summer (DST): UTC+3 (EEST)
- Postal code: 840 01
- Area code: 22860
- Vehicle registration: EM
- Website: ios.gr

Map of Ios

Ios (also spelled Io or Nio; Greek: Ίος, Greek pronunciation: [ˈi.os]; Ancient Greek: Ἴος [í.os]; locally Nios, Νιός) is a Greek island located in the Cyclades group in the Aegean Sea. The island is largely hilly, with cliffs descending steeply to the sea on most sides. It is situated halfway between Naxos and Santorini. Ios measures about 18 kilometres (11 miles) in length and 10 kilometres (6 miles) in width, and covers an area of 109.024 square kilometres (42.094 sq mi). Its population was 2,299 in the 2021 census (down from 3,500 in the 20th century). Ios is part of the Thira regional unit.

== Chora ==
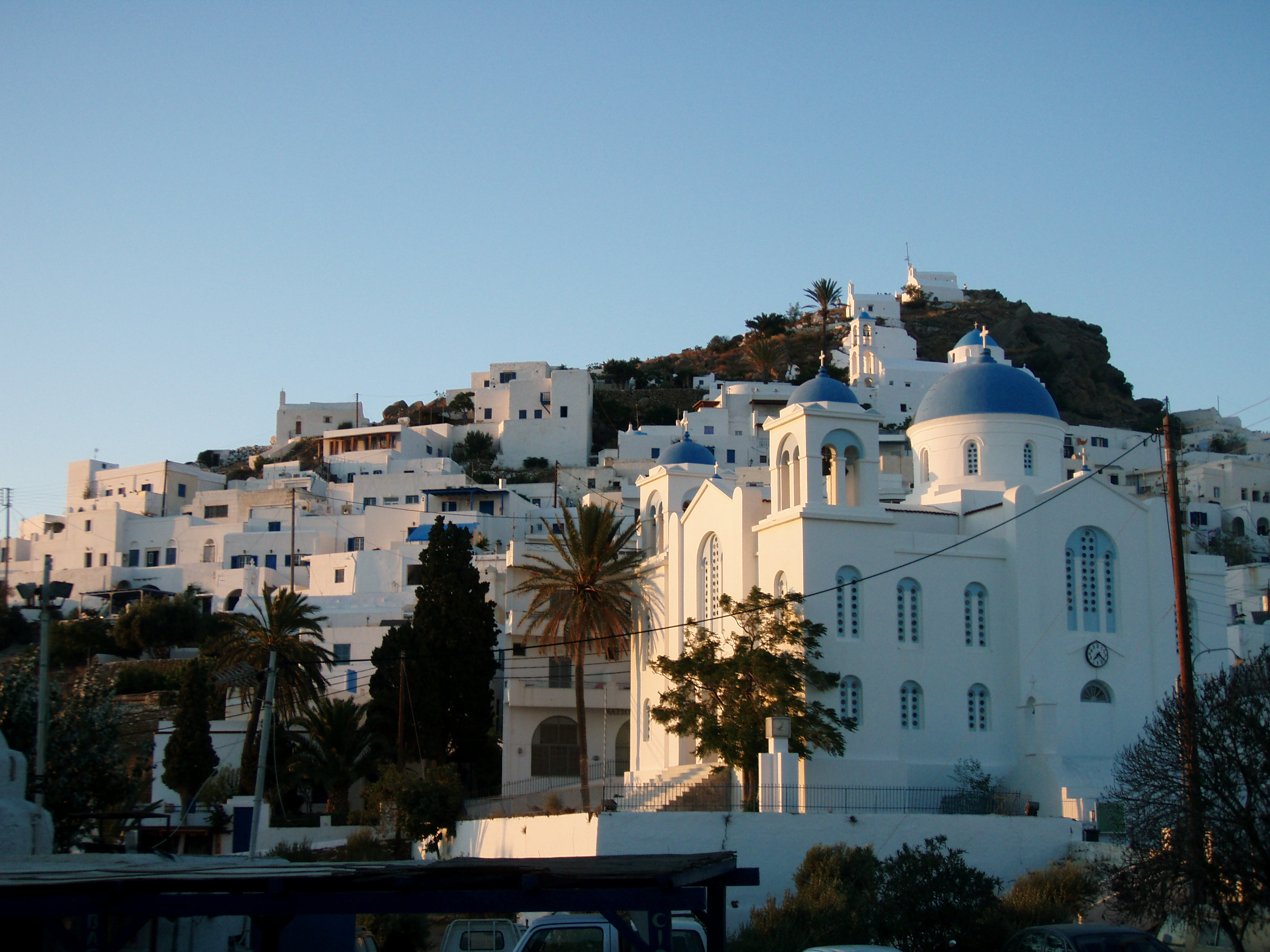
Ios town

The Port of Ios lies at the northern end of Ormos harbour. From there a footpath climbs the hillside to Chora – the island's principal village, derived from the Greek word for a main settlement. Chora is a quintessentially cycladic village, distinguished by its whitewashed architecture, narrow alleys and steep stairways that render it largely inaccessible to cars. Today, Chora's central path is dominated by tourism with a vibrant mix of restaurants, boutiques, bars and discothèques catering to visitors. Beyond Chora and the port, Ios is home to few small settlements, typically a cluster of houses set behind the island's main beaches- Theodoti, Kalamos and Manganari.

Since the 1990s, under the leadership of Mayor Pousseos, the island has pursued a strategy to diversify its appeal to different kinds of tourists. Supported by European Community funds, the island has seen improvements to infrastructure, including the paving of new roads, and the construction of a scenic amphitheatre, at the top of the village hill, designed by German architect, Peter Haupt.

== Name ==
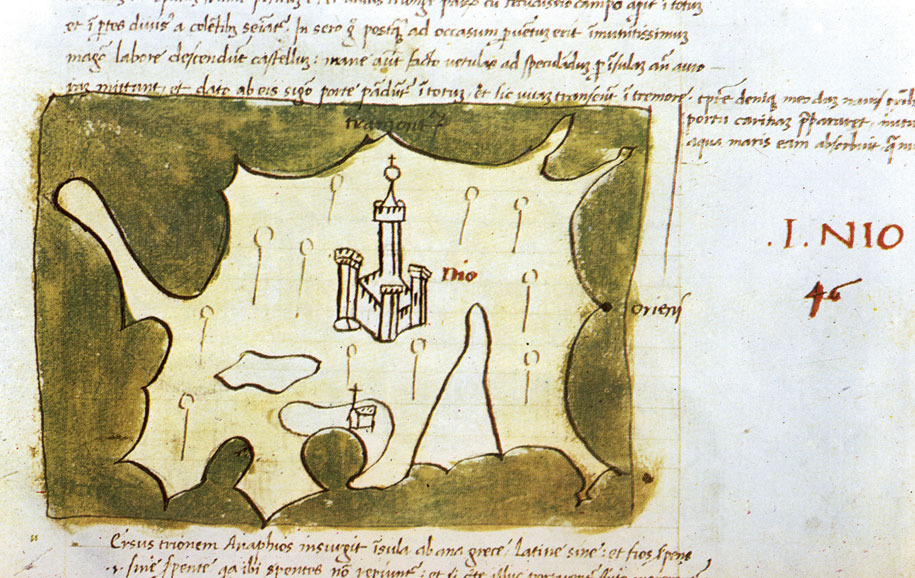
A 1420 map of the island where the name Nio is used

According to Plutarch, the name Ios is thought to derive from the Ancient Greek word for violets, "ἴα", (ia) which were said to grow abundantly on the island – an etymology that remains the most widely accepted. Another theory suggests a Phoenician origin, from the word iion, meaning "pile of stones". Pliny the Elder offered a different explanation, claiming the name came from the Ionians who once inhabited the island.

During the Ottoman period, the island was known as 'Anza' or 'Aina', Its modern name, Ios, was officially established in the 19th century, though it had already been in use for two millennia. In antiquity, the island was also called "Φοινίκη" (Phiniki), named by and after the Phoenicians. In the 3rd century BCE, when Ios joined League of the Islanders, it was temporarily renamed Arsinoe, in honour of Arsinoe II, the wife of Ptolemy II

Today the island is referred to as Nio, by the inhabitants of the Cycladic Islands – a name that dates back to the Byzantine Era. During the time of Ottoman rule, travellers sometimes called it "Little Malta", a nickname reflecting the island's reputation as a haven for pirates. In Latin script languages, the island's name appears as Nio or Io.

== Geography and geology ==
Ios has a roughly rectangular shape, measuring approximately 15 km (9.3 mi) in length and 7 km (4.3 mi) in width. Its longest axis runs northwest, from Cape Karatza to the Achlades Peninsula, spanning 17.5 km (10.9 mi). Another major axis, orientated northeast-southwest measures about 14 km (8.6 mi).

The island boasts a total coastline of 86 km (53.4 mi), with around 32 km (19.9 mi) consisting of sandy beaches.

The highest point on Ios is Kastro (Greek: Κάστρο) also known as Pyrgos (Greek: Πύργος), which rises to an elevation of 723 m (2372 ft) and is located in the centre of the island. Surrounding Kastro are the next three highest peaks: Xylodema (Greek: Ξυλόδεμα) at 660 m (2165 ft), Kostiza (Greek: Κοστίζα) at 586 m (1923 ft) and Prophetis Elias (Greek: Προφήτης Ηλίας) at 490 m (951 ft).

Geologically, Ios consists almost entirely of metamorphic rocks, with limited occurrences of quaternary deposits.

=== Homer Plan ===
In the event of extreme weather emergencies, such as earthquakes and wildfires, the Municipality of Ios has developed a comprehensive contingency plan known as "Homer" (Greek: Όμηρος) which outlines coordinated action and cooperation among all the residents of Ios.

== Demographics ==
Historic population
Year	Pop.	±% p.a.
1696	3,000	—
1771	1,400	−1.01%
1829	2,177	+0.76%
1856	2,167	−0.02%
1879	2,113	−0.11%
1889	2,043	−0.34%
1896	2,171	+0.87%
1907	2,090	−0.35%
1920	2,154	+0.23%
1928	1,797	−2.24%
1940	2,041	+1.07%
1951	1,753	−1.37%
1961	1,343	−2.63%
1971	1,270	−0.56%
1981	1,362	+0.70%
1991	1,654	+1.96%
2001	1,838	+1.06%
2011	2,024	+0.97%
2021	2,299	+1.28%

According to the Greek census 2011, 2,084 people live in Ios. 1,754 of which live in the capital town of Chora. From the 1940s to the early 1970s, the population of the island reduced consistently. The main causes of this phenomenon were the migration movement, the epidemiological conditions of the time and to a lesser extent, the loss of men aged between 18 and 45 during the war.

== Food ==
The island is famous for its local cheeses. They are mainly made in the municipal creamery using milk from goats or sheep. The most famous one is the "skotíri" (σκοτύρι), a sour cheese with the smell of summer savory. Popular dishes of Ios are the "tsimediá" (τσιμεντιά, pumpkin flowers stuffed with rice) and "mermitzéli" (μερμιτζέλι, handmade barley).

== Education ==
In 1827 the local leaders of Ios wrote a letter to the revolutionary government of Greece requesting a school to open in the island. During the 1850s the first school opened which housed a small number of students of all ages. The type of school that operated was called Skolarcheion (Greek: Σχολαρχείον) and was equivalent to an elementary school with some high school basic courses. Most students at the time didn't graduate as their time was occupied helping their families in the fields. This resulted in a large percentage of illiterate children. The richer families sent their children to schools of the nearby islands. From 1936 the first elementary school was founded. In 1972 the first kindergarten was opened and in 1980 the first high school that had some senior high school courses. Today, in Chora there is a kindergarten, a high school, a senior high school and an EPAL high school.

== History ==
=== Prehistory ===
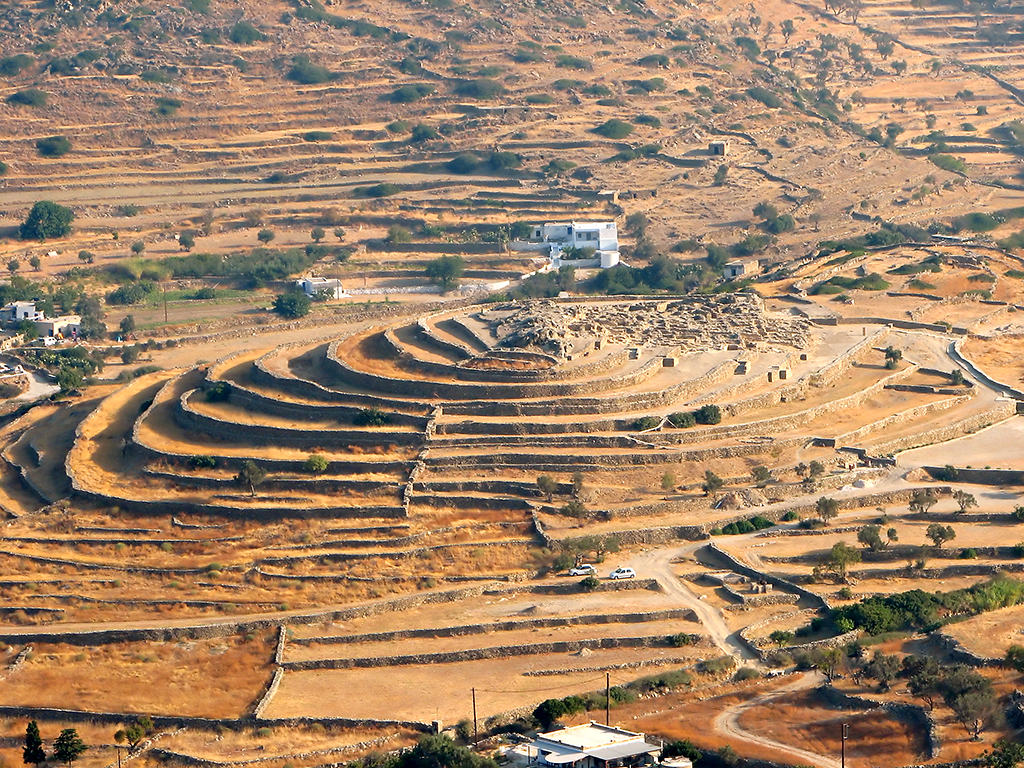
The Skarkos hill

Ios from the prehistoric era and thanks to its safe natural harbour played an important role on the sea roads to Crete. The early Cycladic settlement on Skarkos hill and other prehistoric sites on the island have been found by archaeologists. Ios was under the influence of the Minoan and then of the Mycenaean civilisation. The Phoenicians most likely arrived on the island and maintained their presence until the 9th century BC.

Ios became Ionian at some point after, as testified by its membership in the Delian Amphictyony. From 534 BC the island paid taxes to Athens.

=== Classical and Hellenistic times ===
Ios was an important and strong city in Classical and Hellenistic times. Its decline began with the Roman occupation, when it was used as a place for exile, and continued in Byzantine times. The island experienced a recovery at the time of the Duchy of Naxos, but the Ottoman domination interrupted it. Palaiokastro, a ruined Venetian castle from the 15th century lies on the northern part of the island. Ios was important enough in the Roman province of Insulae to become a suffragan see of the Metropolis of Rhodes, but later faded and disappeared.

=== Numismatics ===
During the 3rd and 2nd century BC as Ios became part of the league of the islanders, she minted her own coins, most of them can be found in the Berlin Archaeological Museum and British Museum. There are 28 known different coins. They depict Homer, a palm tree or Athena, as she was worshiped on the island. Most of them had the writing ΙΗΤΩΝ meaning of the people of Ios.

=== Middle Ages ===
Albanians settled in Ios either by invitation of the Crispi family or later in 1579 to repopulate the island as its inhabitants had been sold into slavery in 1558. The Albanians of Ios were linguistically assimilated in the second half of the 18th century as Greeks settled in the island.

=== 1820s ===
Although Ios did not have a strong naval force, it was one of the first islands to raise the flag of revolution in when the Greek War of Independence began in 1821. Ios took part in the naval battle at Kuşadası on July 9, 1821, as well as in the Second National Assembly at Astros in 1823 and in the Third National Assembly at Troezen in 1827.

=== Modern times ===
In a modern era, the island began to emerge in the 1970s as an increasingly popular tourist destination for young people in Europe. Today Ios retains its reputation as an island of youth and entertainment, with excellent tourist infrastructure, an organised marina at its harbour and an adequate road network.

Ecclesiastically, its territory is now part of the Greek Orthodox Metropolis of Thera, Amorgos and the Islands of the Church of Greece.

== Homer's death ==
=== The legend ===
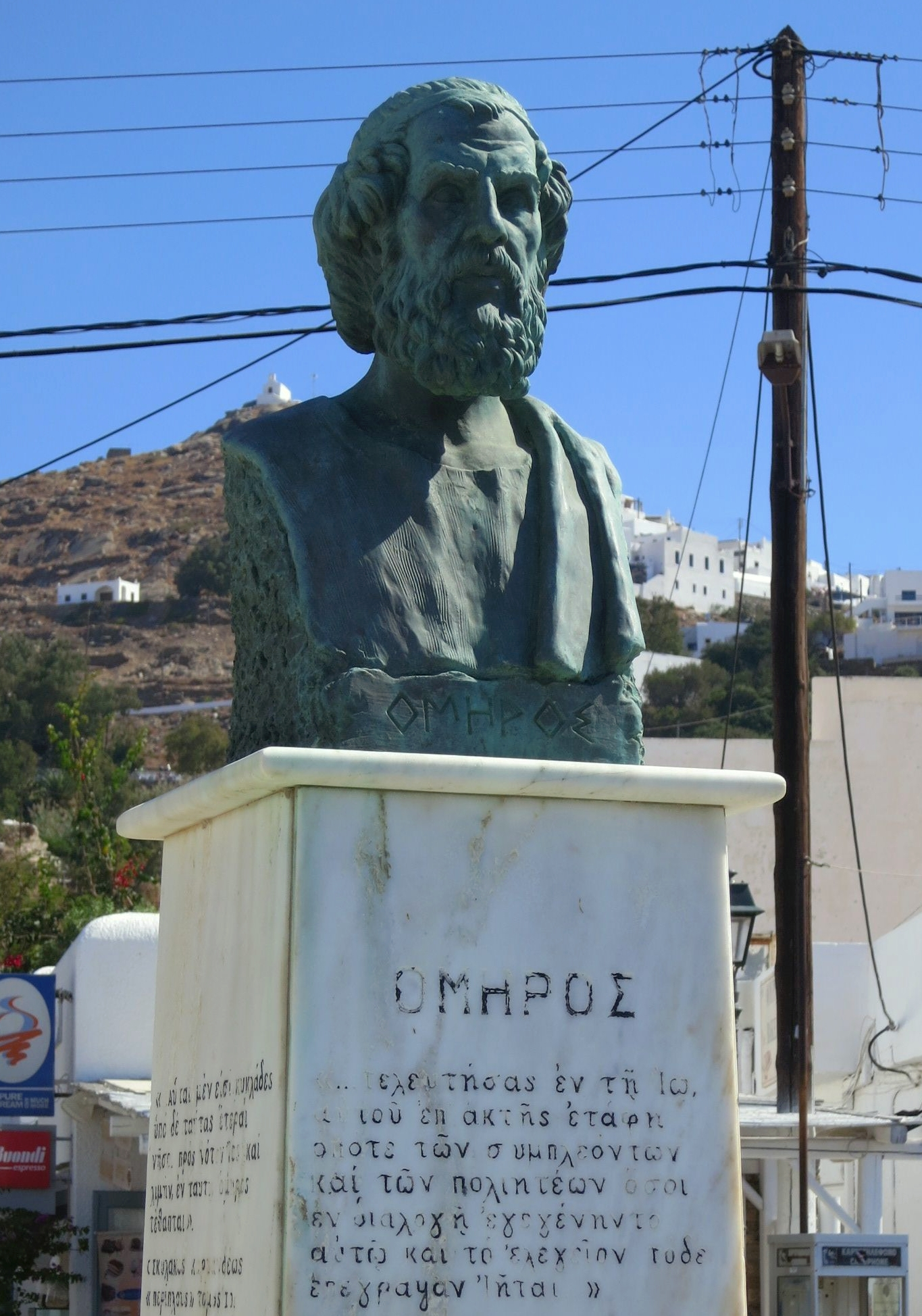
Bust of Homer in Ios

The island is very strongly connected with Homer, because according to the legend, Homer died in Ios. Considered the greatest epic poet of the Greeks, the legend accounts that he died because he violated a Pythian oracle. According to Pausanias, Homer visited the Delphi oracle to ask Pythia about his parents and origins. Pythia replied with the oracle "Your mother's home is the island of Ios, which will accept you when you die, but you should be careful of the enigma of the young children." The poet, however, broke the oracle and traveled to Ios. There he saw some small children fishing on the coast. He asked what they had caught and the children replied: "Whatever we get we leave it and whatever we don't get we take it with us". The children were talking about lice. Those who found them, killed them, but those who did not find them, had them to their heads. Homer did not find the answer, but he remembered the warning of Pythia. He was horrified and ran away quickly. The road was muddy and the poet in his hurry slipped and fell, hitting his head and dying almost instantaneously.

According to another version, Homer died from his sadness that he did not solve the puzzle, while a third version says he was already seriously ill and went to Ios because he knew he would die. Of course, the death of Homer is not based on historical records, but on myths and traditions that circulated from oral tradition. Pausanias simply recorded a popular narrative.

=== Count Pasch van Krienen's expedition ===
In 1771, Heinrich Leonard Pasch van Krienen came to Ios after having read the narrative in order to find Homer's grave. He was informed by a local priest of the Saint Catherine (Agia Aikaterini) Chapel that there is a place with marbles and some of which had inscriptions. He was told that they were constructed long after Homer's death but he persisted and with the help of Spyridon Valetas he found three graves and the last one had inscriptions about Homer including Ενθάδε την ιερήν κεφαλήν κατά γαία καλύπτει ανδρών ηρώων κοσμήτορα θείον Όμηρον, which means "here under the earth lies the sacred head of heroic Homer." When he found this, Pasch was sure that the grave belonged to the epic poet, but he spotted some grammatical mistakes on the gravestone and began doubting its authenticity. After having spent considerable time and money, he decided to give up after having also found two graves at Agia Theodoti

On 25 January 1884 the alleged tomb of Homer was visited by Theodore and Mabel Bent during their tour of the Cyclades.

== Beaches ==
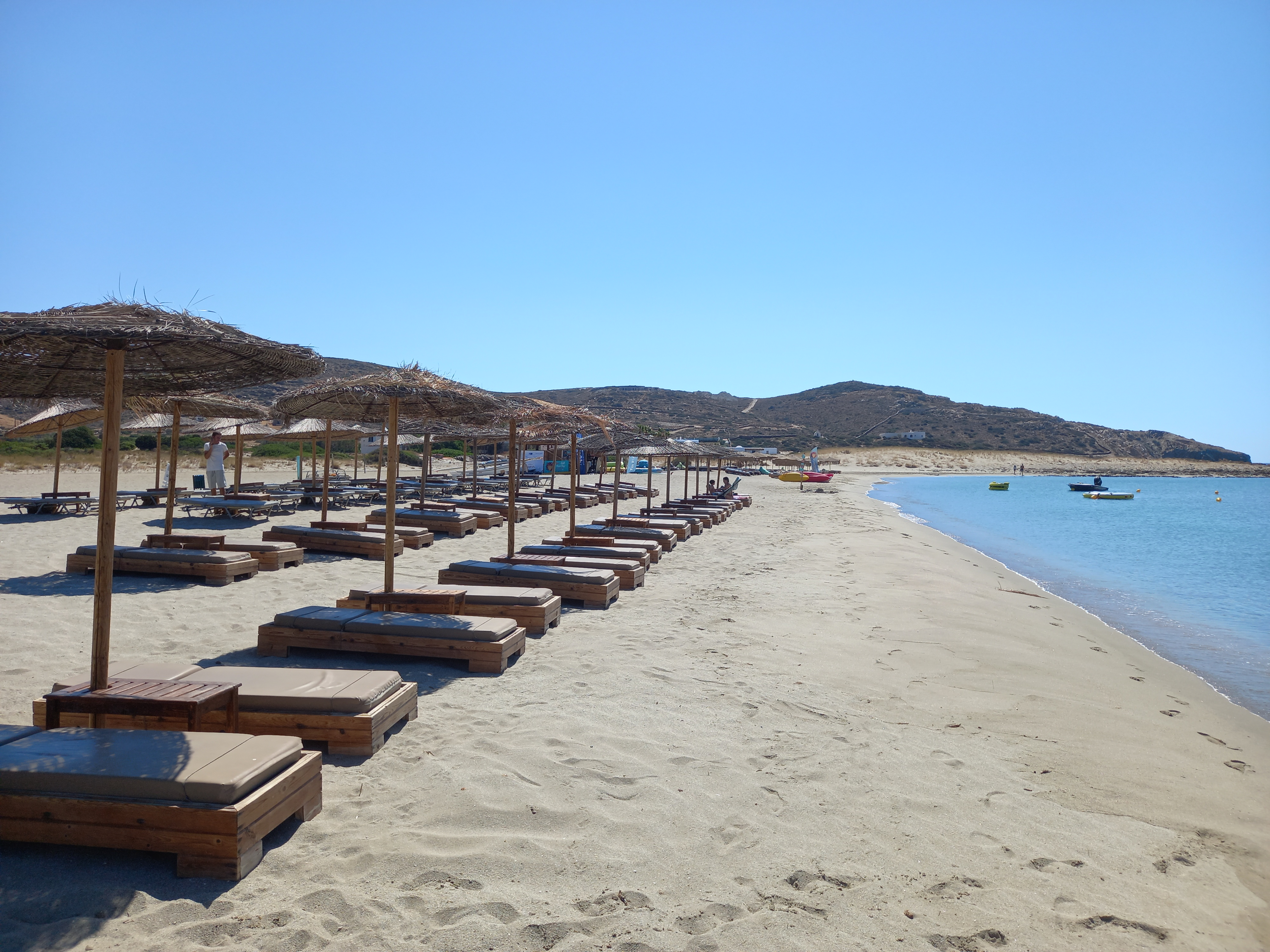
The Maganari beach at Ios island in Greece

Ios attracts a large number of young tourists, many of whom used to sleep on their sleeping bags during the 1970s on the popular beach of Mylopotas after partying through the night. Today Mylopotas beach has been developed to an equivalent mass package tourism resort like Platys Gialos and Paradise Beach of Mykonos. Another nice beach at the south of the island, is Maganari, or Manganari.

== Climate ==
Ios has a hot semi-arid climate (Köppen climate classification: BSh). Similar to other Cyclades islands, there is an almost constant breeze from the north during summer, known as meltemi, which moderates temperatures.

Climate data for Ios island (3m)
Month	Jan	Feb	Mar	Apr	May	Jun	Jul	Aug	Sep	Oct	Nov	Dec	Year
Mean daily maximum °C (°F)	14.7 (58.5)	15.5 (59.9)	17.3 (63.1)	18.9 (66.0)	23.8 (74.8)	27 (81)	29.2 (84.6)	29.3 (84.7)	26.8 (80.2)	24.6 (76.3)	20.6 (69.1)	17.6 (63.7)	22.1 (71.8)
Mean daily minimum °C (°F)	10.1 (50.2)	11 (52)	12.5 (54.5)	14 (57)	17.4 (63.3)	21.9 (71.4)	23.9 (75.0)	24.5 (76.1)	22.4 (72.3)	19.7 (67.5)	16.5 (61.7)	13.6 (56.5)	17.3 (63.1)
Average precipitation mm (inches)	74 (2.9)	69.8 (2.75)	66.2 (2.61)	25.2 (0.99)	1 (0.0)	0.5 (0.02)	0.1 (0.00)	0 (0)	1.6 (0.06)	33.7 (1.33)	53.5 (2.11)	52.6 (2.07)	378.2 (14.84)
Source: http://penteli.meteo.gr/stations/ios/ (2019 – 2020 averages)

== Timeline ==
Year	Event
3rd millennium BC	Humans start living in the island
350 BC	The island minted the first coins depicting Homer
314 BC	The island joined the League of the Islanders
300 BC – 200	It becomes part of the Roman Empire and part of the provincia insularum
286	It becomes part of the Byzantine Empire
1207	The island is conquered by the Venetians and becomes a part of the Duchy of Naxos
1269	The island is regained by the Byzantine Empire
1296	The island is conquered by Domenico Schiavi and remained in his family
1335	The island is conquered for a second time by the Duchy of Naxos
1371	The island is under Francesco I Crispo's control and his family's
1537	The island is occupied by Hayreddin Barbarossa but remains under the control of the Crispo family
1558	The island is attacked by pirates causing most of the people of Ios to move to other islands
1566	After the death of the last Cripi, the island becomes part of the Ottoman Empire and its under the administration of Joseph Nasi
March 1, 1821	Panagiotis Amoiradakis raised the flag of the Greek revolution in Ios
July 9, 1821	The island takes part in the Naval battle of Kuşadası
1830	Ios becomes part of Greece

== Notable people ==
=== Ancient ===
- Critheïs, mother of Homer

=== Medieval ===
- Adriana Crispo (d. after 1537), noblewoman of the Crispo family, lady of Ios

=== Modern ===
- Spyridon Valetas (1779–1843), scholar, member of Filiki Eteria
- Lakis Nikolaou (1949– ), footballer
- Jean-Marie Drot (1929–2015), writer and cinematographer who loved the island and also founded The Jean Marie Drot Museum in Ios

== Gallery ==
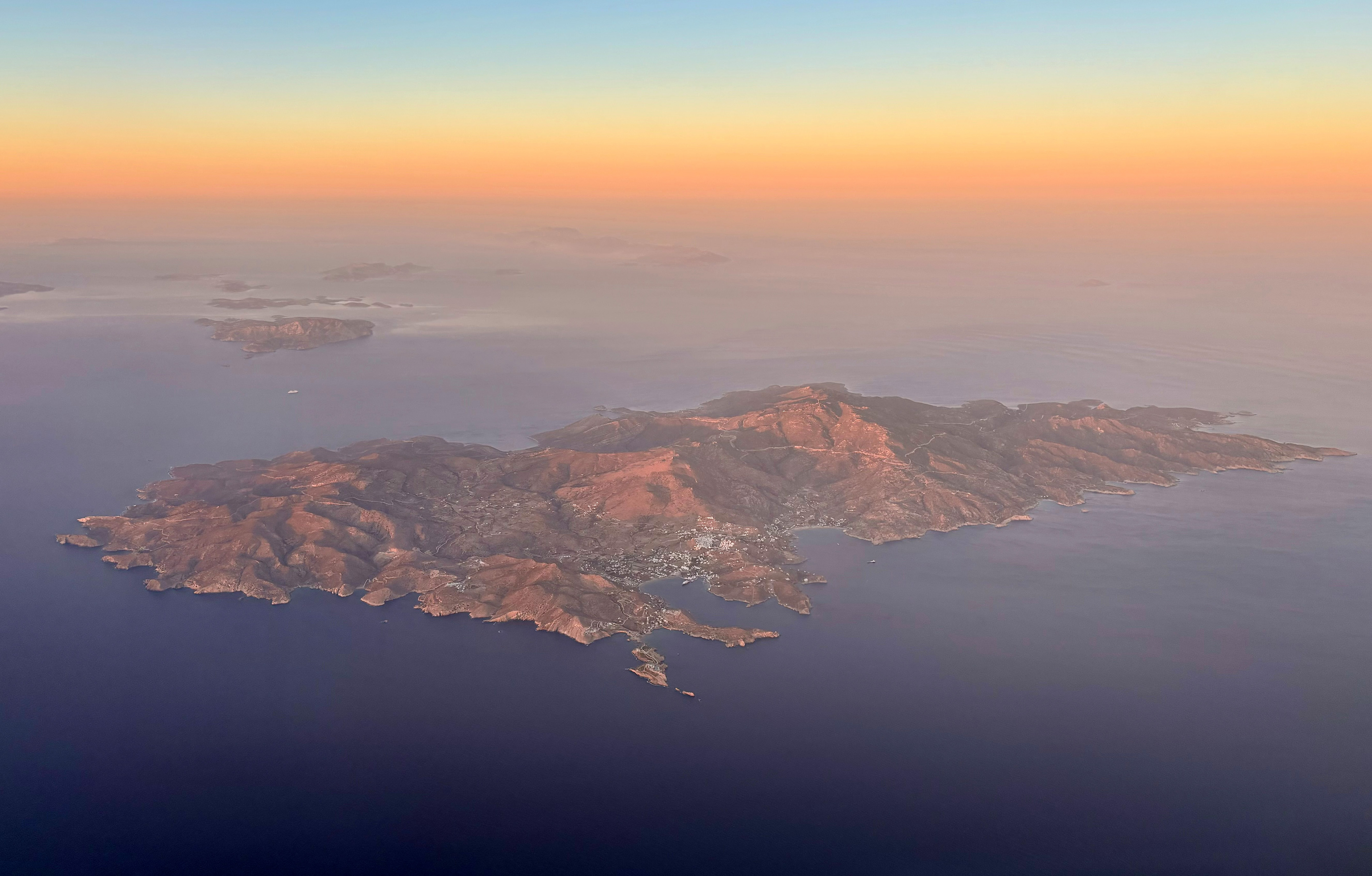
Aerial view of the island

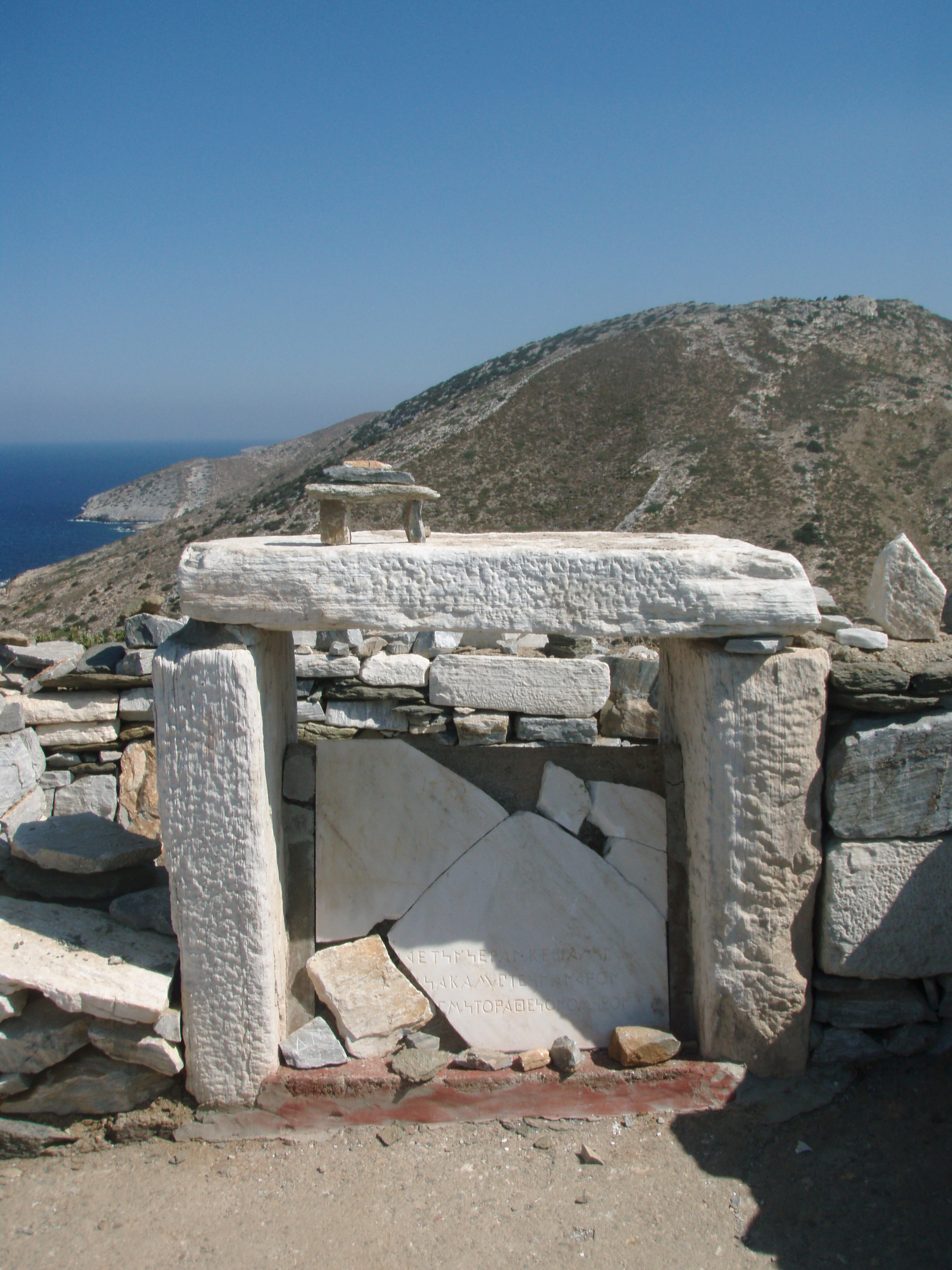
Tomb of Homer

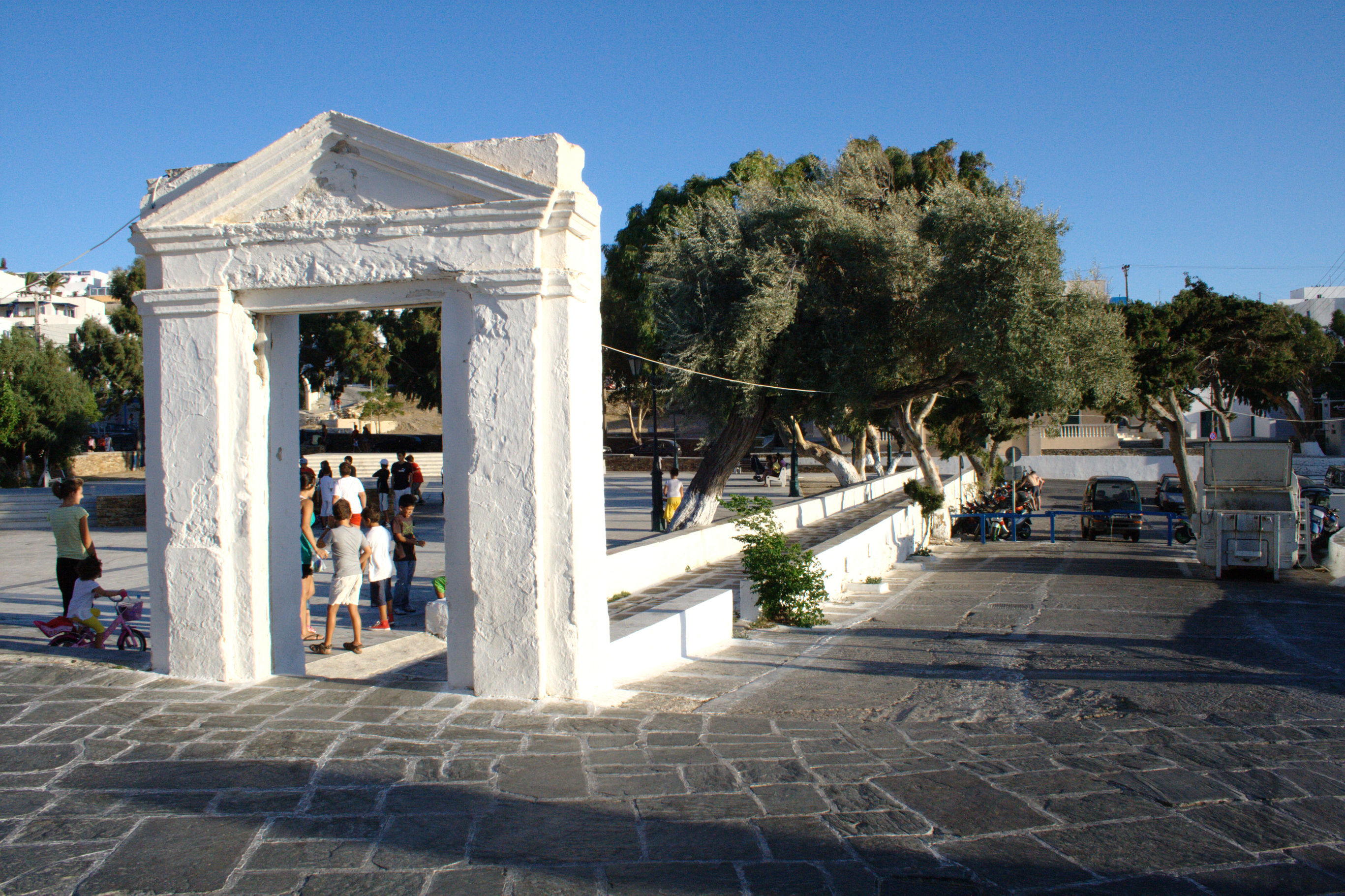
View of Chora

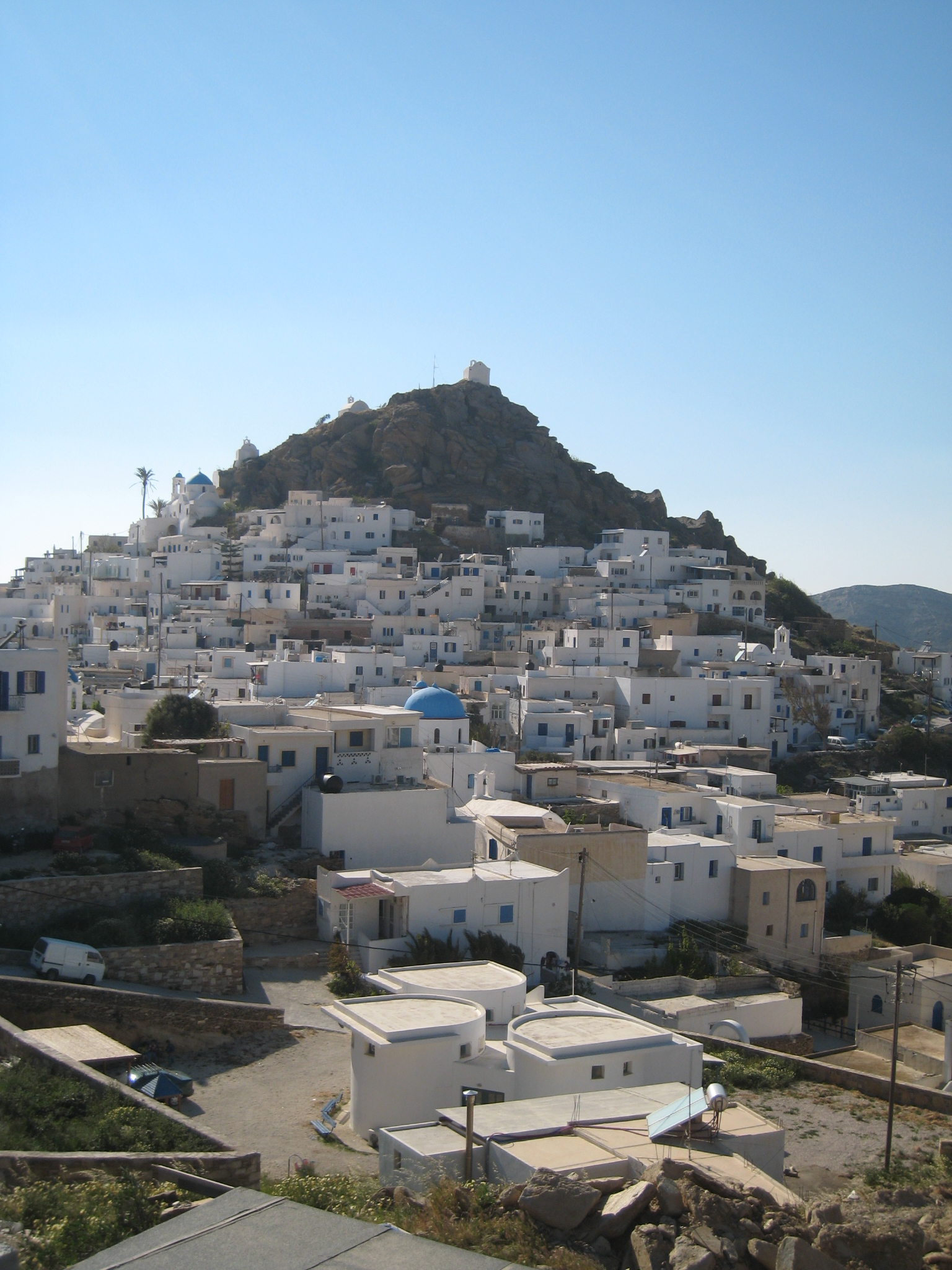
Chora

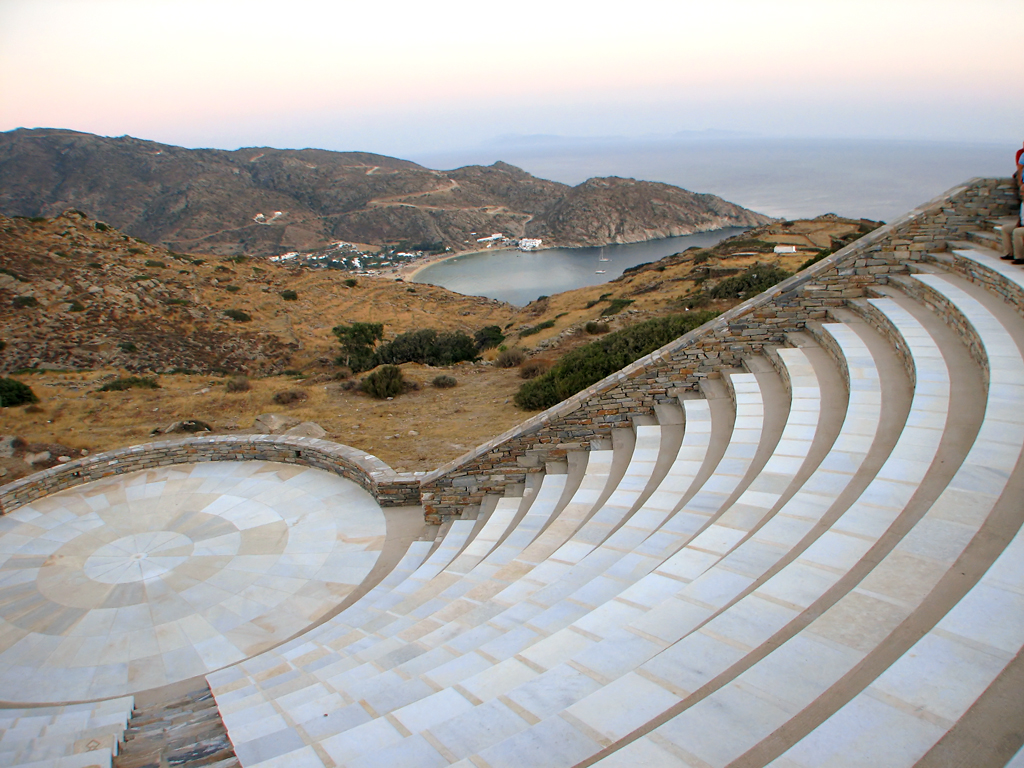
Odysseas Elytis Theatre

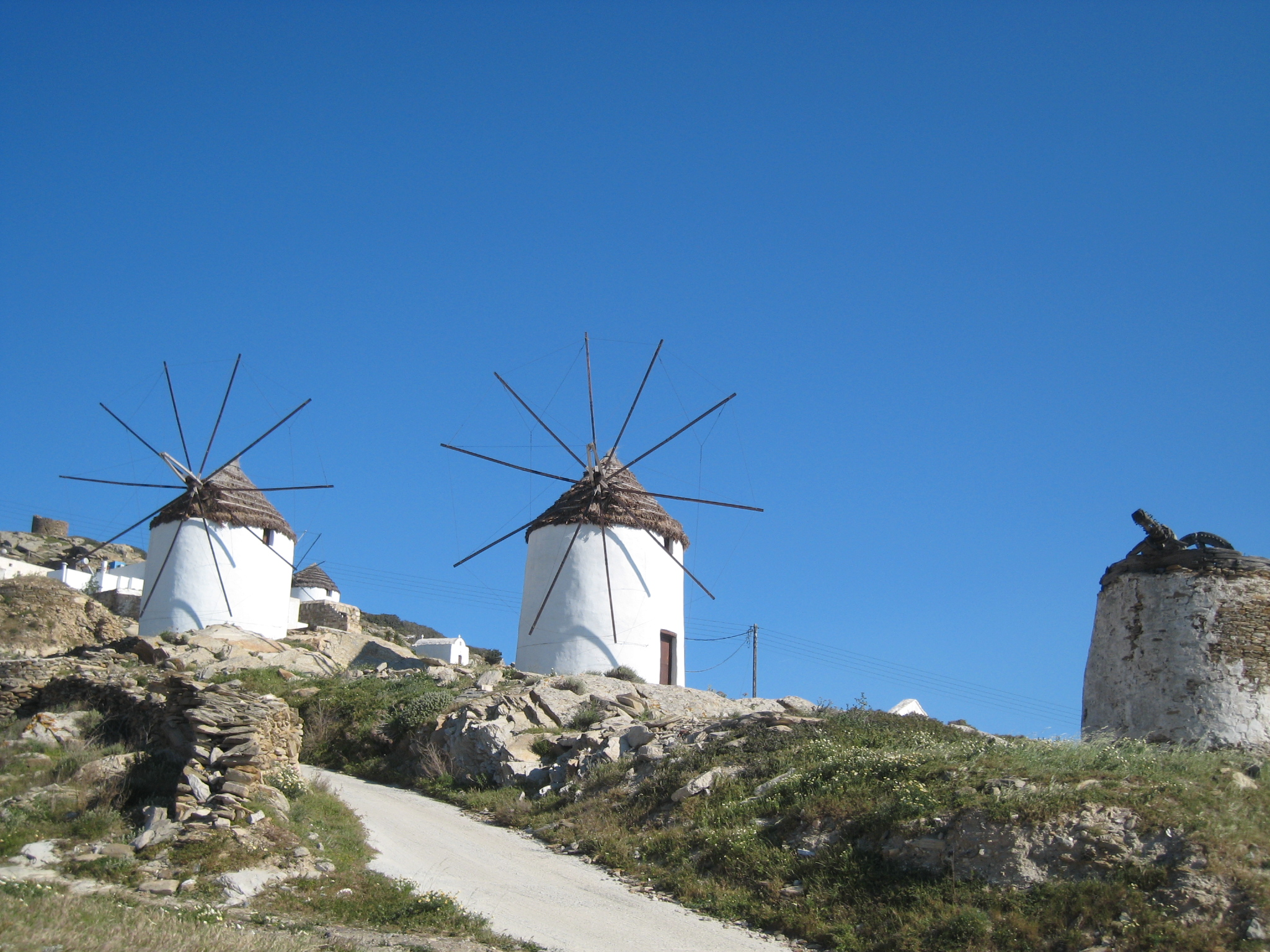
Windmills

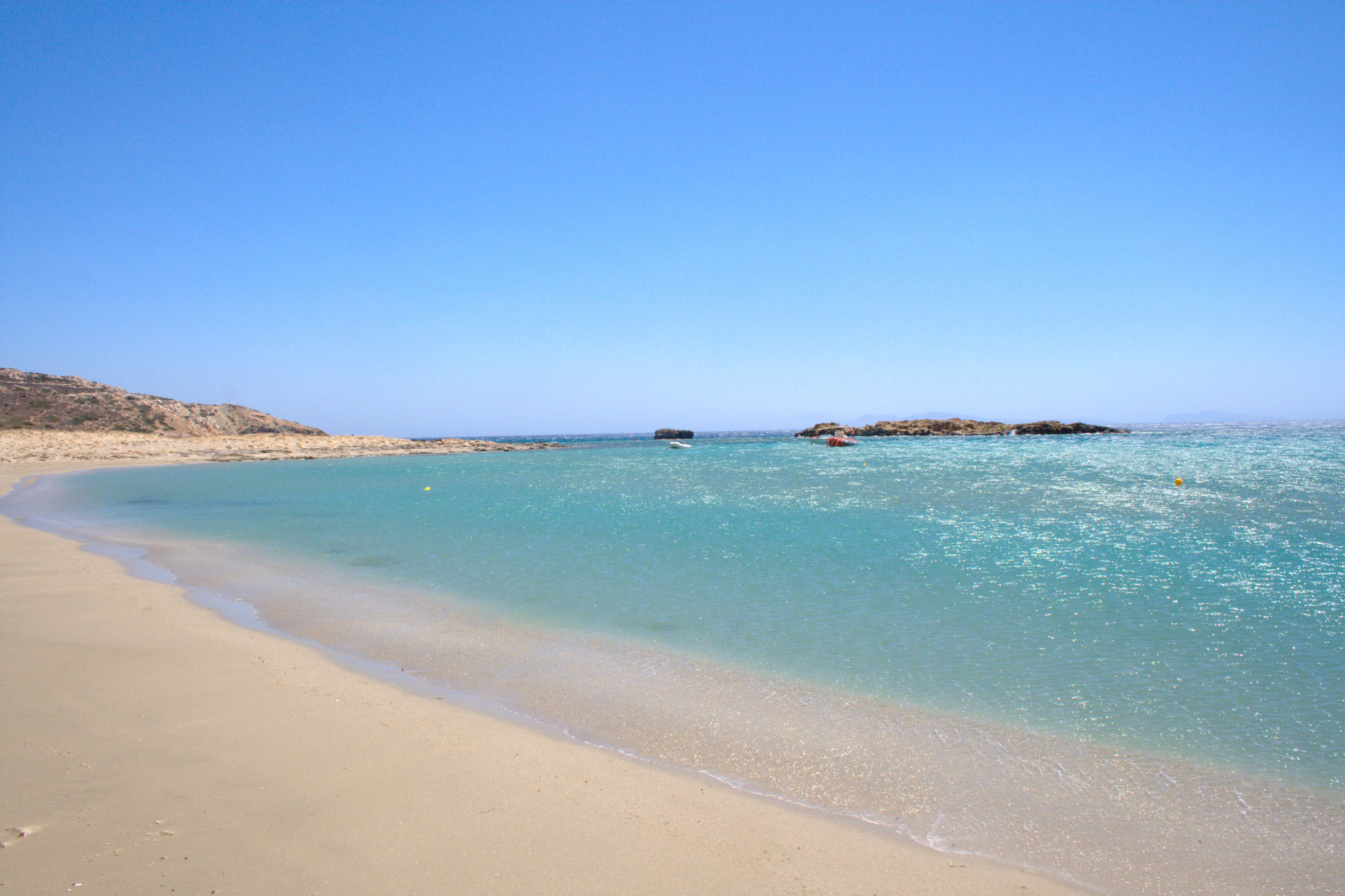
Manganari Beach

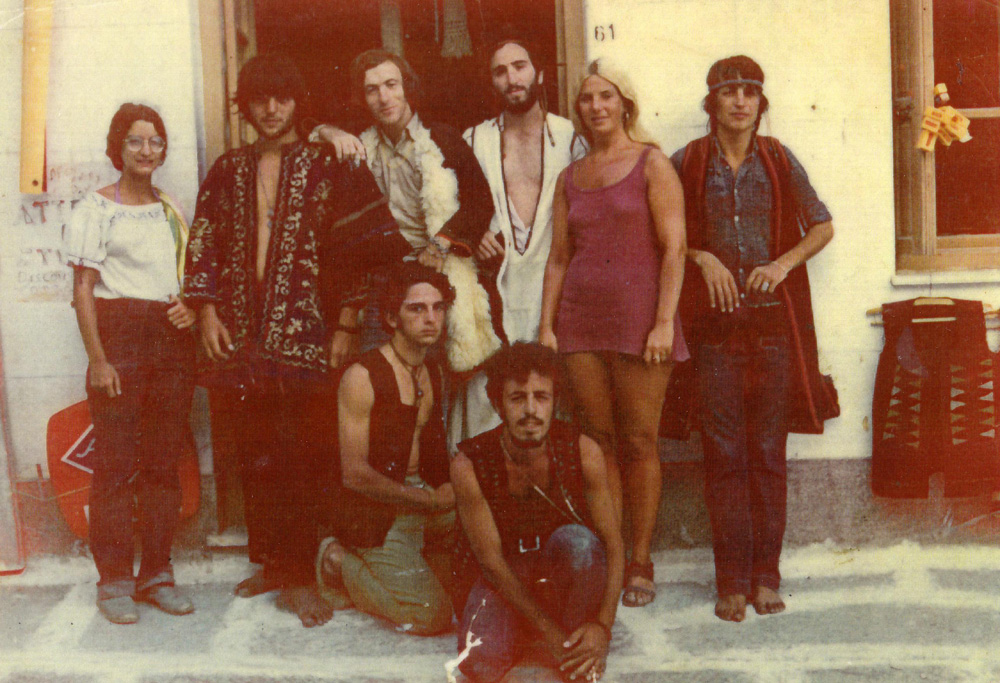
Young Hippies on Ios during the 1970s

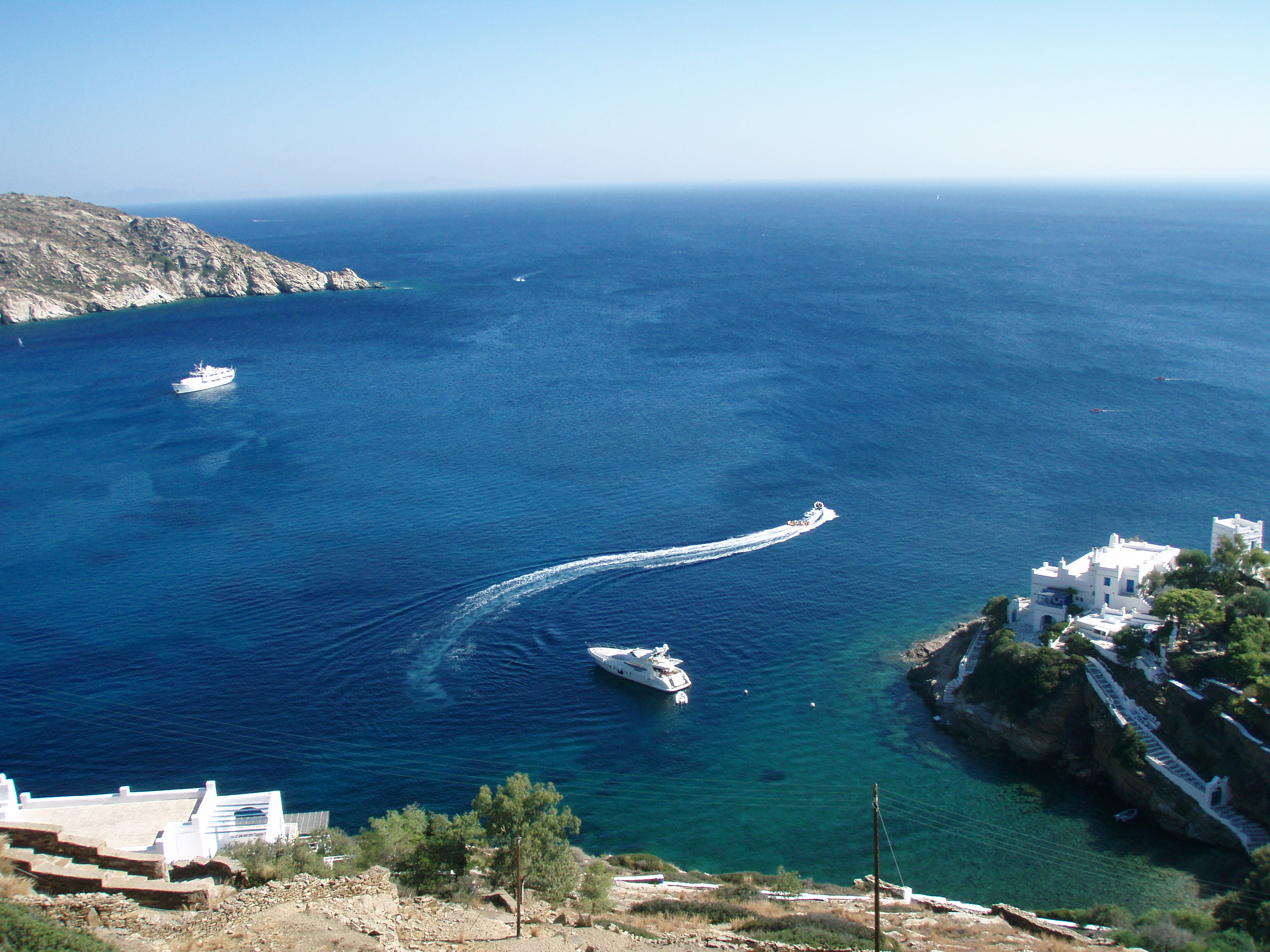
Western view of Ios

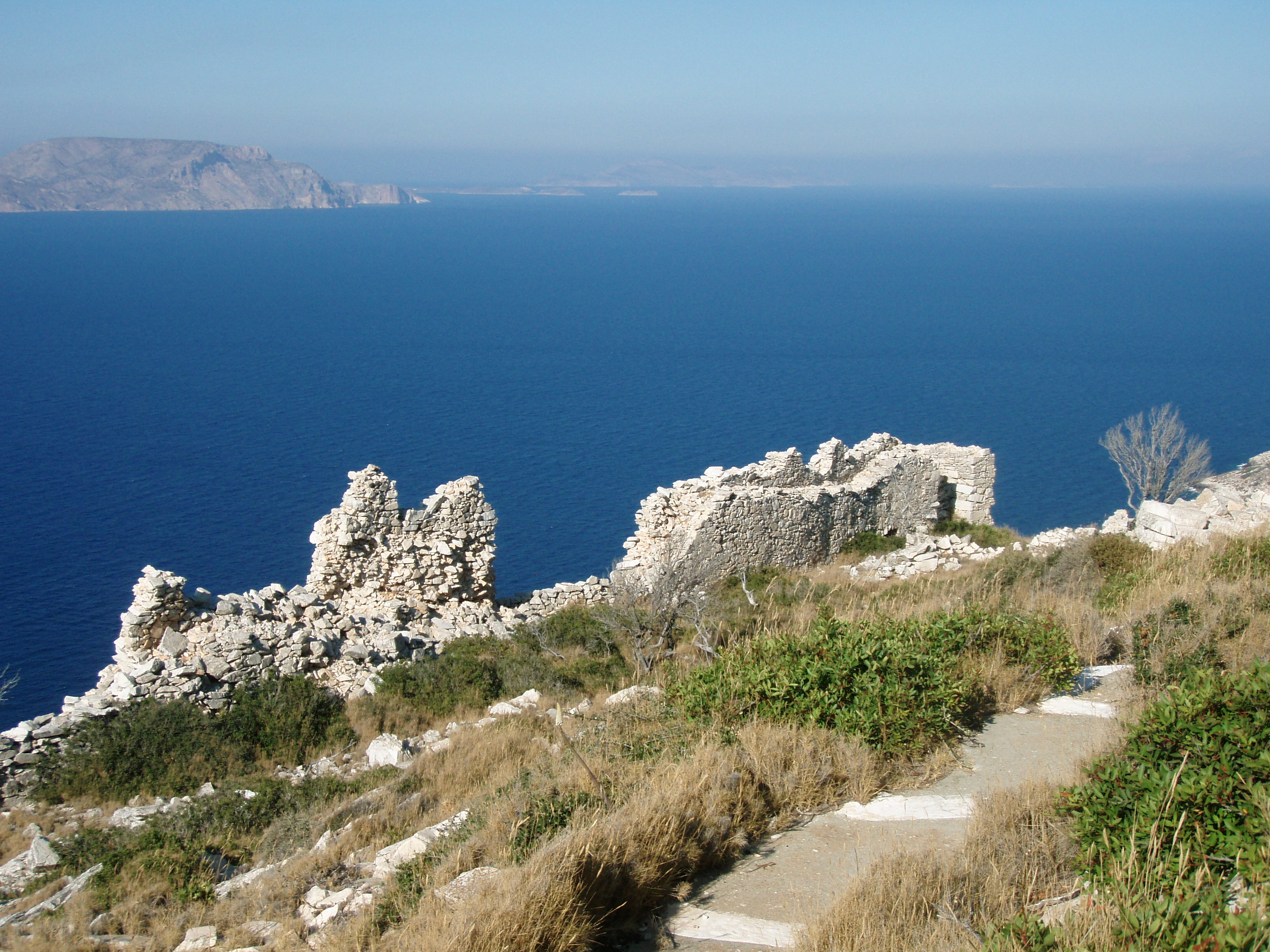
Eastern view of Ios
