= Chora, Ios =

Chora - Ios Χώρα - Ίος
- Settlement
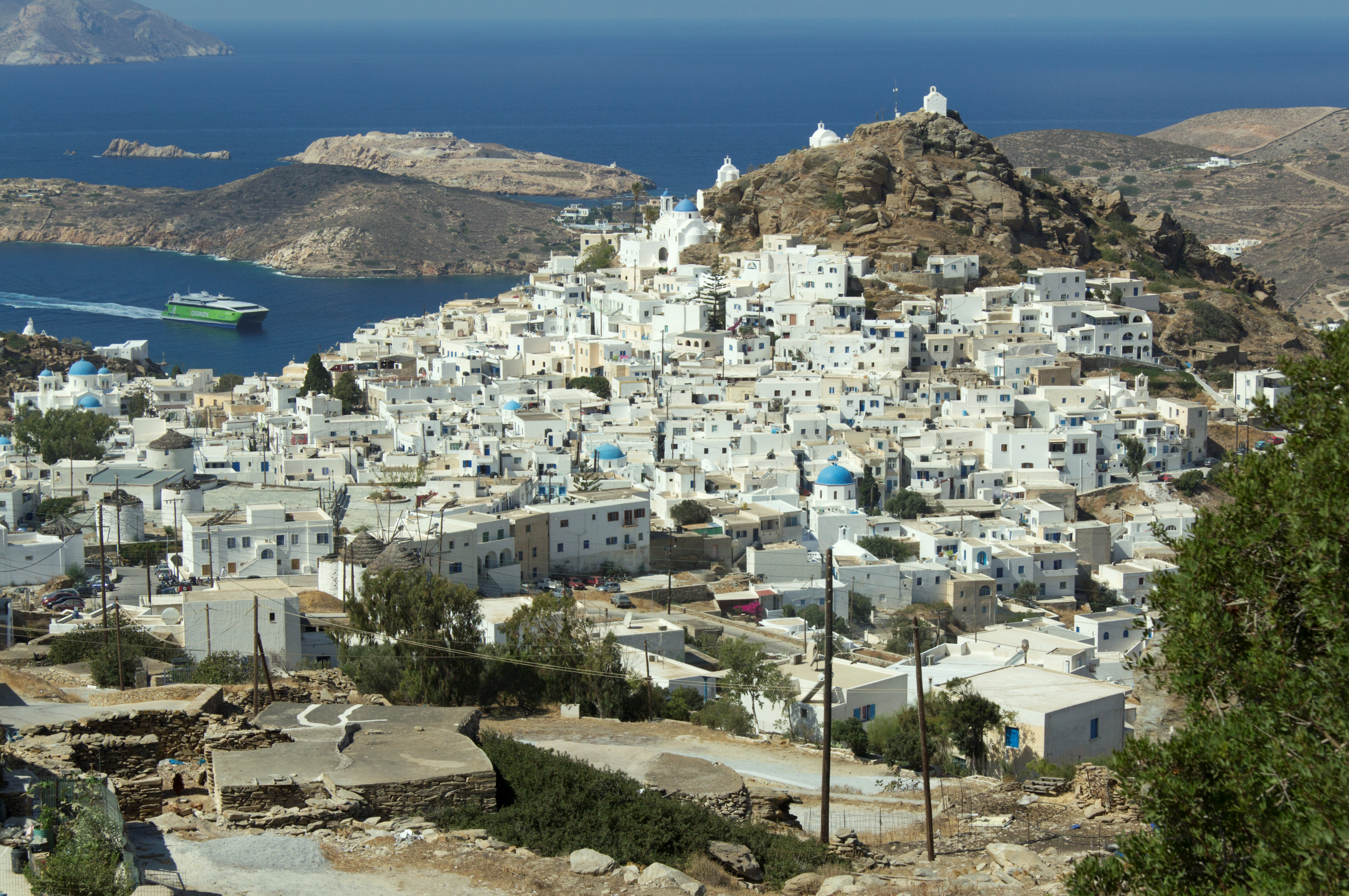

- Location within Greece
- Coordinates: 36°43′24″N 25°16′54″E
- Country: Greece
- Administrative region: South Aegean
- Regional unit: Thira
- Municipality: Ios

Area
  - Total: 1.41 km^{2} (0.54 sq mi)
- Elevation: 112 m (367 ft)

Population (2021)
  - Total: 1,957
  - Density: 1,390/km^{2} (3,590/sq mi)
- Time zone: UTC+2 (EET)
  - Summer (DST): UTC+3 (EEST)
- Postal code: 840 01
- Area code: 22860

Chora or Hora (Greek: Χώρα), officially Ios (Greek: Ίος), is the capital town of Ios Island in Greece and is the largest settlement on the island. It contains many of the island's facilities of tourism such as hotels and apartments. The town has only some small roads for cars, with many paths only accessible by foot. It is built between two small hills and in the town there are at least 24 small churches with the most famous one being the church of Panagia Gremiotissa ("Panagia of the Cliff"). The modern town sits on the ruins of the ancient polis (city-state) of Ios.

== Architecture ==
The town has typically Cycladic architecture. Almost all the buildings are covered with a layer of white lime with sea blue colored doors and window frames. There are no roads but stairs leading up to the Chora's hill. Most buildings at their base have small souvenir shops, cafe shops and restaurants and on the upper floors the residents live.

== Climate ==
Chora

Climate chart (precipitation, max. and min. temperature)
J	F	M	A	M	J	J	A	S	O	N	D
92 14 6	84 11 7	54 15 12	22 22 13	3 27 16	4 29 20	1 35 22	1 33 24	10 28 20	34 26 18	94 20 15	131 17 12
- █ Average max. and min. temperatures in °C
- █ Precipitation totals in mm
Imperial conversion
J	F	M	A	M	J	J	A	S	O	N	D
3.6 57 43	3.3 52 45	2.1 59 54	0.9 72 55	0.1 81 61	0.2 84 68	0 95 72	0 91 75	0.4 82 68	1.3 79 64	3.7 68 59	5.2 63 54
- █ Average max. and min. temperatures in °F
- █ Precipitation totals in inches

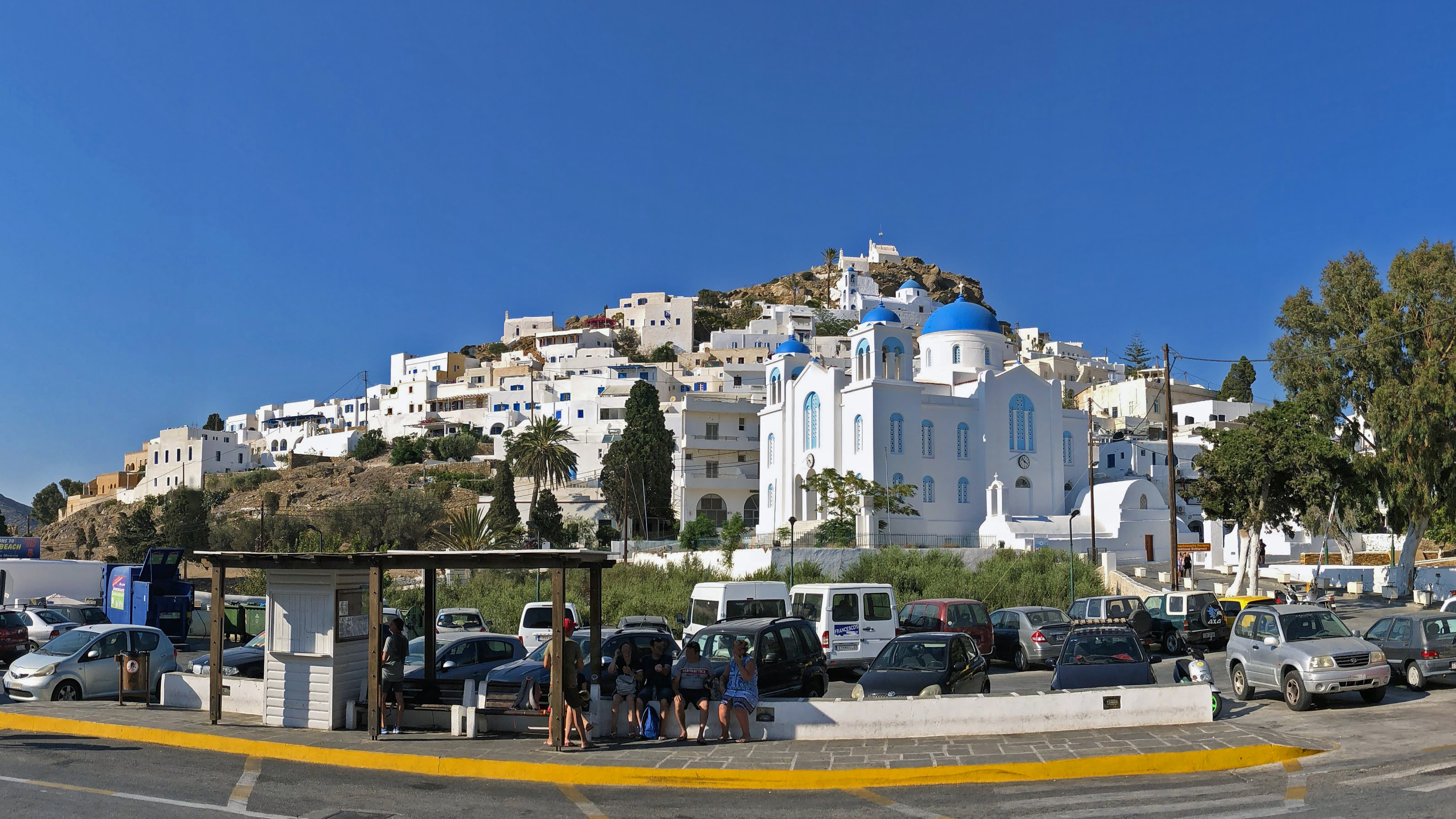
View of Chora of Ios
