= Marpissa, Paros =

Community in South Aegean region, Greece

Marpissa Μάρπησσα
- Community
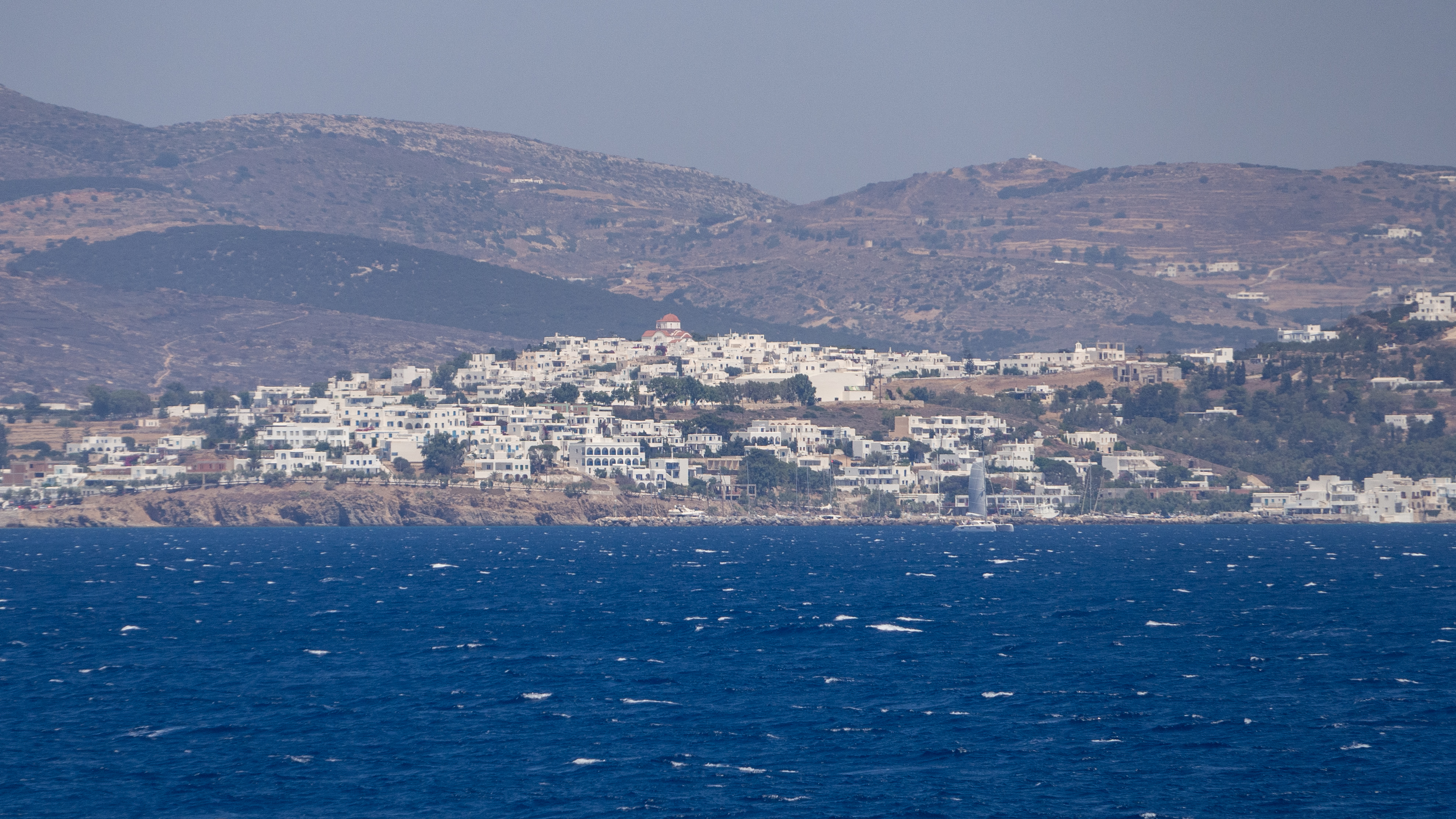

- Location within Greece
- Coordinates: 37°02′39″N 25°14′55″E
- Country: Greece
- Administrative region: South Aegean
- Regional unit: Paros
- Municipality: Paros
- Elevation: 32 m (105 ft)

Population (2021)
  - Community: 1,319
- Time zone: UTC+2 (EET)
  - Summer (DST): UTC+3 (EEST)

Marpissa (Greek: Μάρπησσα, until 1926 Tsipidos, Greek: Τσιπίδος) is a village and a community in Paros, Greece. It is built on a hill at the east side of the island. It is 19 kilometres (12 mi) away from Parikia, the capital of the island, and near the villages of Marmara and Prodromos. According to the 2021 census, it has 1,319 inhabitants. Marpissa has been legally characterised as a traditional settlement.

== History ==
On the west slopes of mount Profitis Ilias, near Marpissa, lies the cave of the Demons or Kalampaki. In the cave evidence of use from the late Neolithic and early Cycladic period, which correspond to fifth to third millennium BC, as well as findings dating from the late Cycladic and Mycenaean period. The findings include ceramics, like conical cups, seashells, animal bones and remains of fire. An ancient town known as Marpessa is mentioned in Paros, but its location remains unspecified.

Near Marpissa lies the hill of Kephalos, on top of which the Venetians built a castle, the third in the island after those in Parikia and Naousa. The construction of the castle, according to archaeological evidence, started in late 13th century. The castle was ready in the start of the 15th century, when it was mentioned by Cristoforo Buondelmonti (1415-1420). Furthermore, the inaugurational inscription at the church of Evaggelismos mentions 1410 as year of construction. The castle was expanded in circa 1500 by Niccolo Sommaripa, who moved the capital of the island from Parikia to Kephalos. Hayreddin Barbarossa sieged and conquered the castle in 1537.

Marpissa may have started developing during the second half of the 16th century, with the creation of a fortress-like settlement. Possibly, Marpissa, Marmara and Prodromos were created by the inhabitants of Kephalos castle and nearby hamlets. Marpissa and Marmara are mentioned in the Ottoman sources of late 17th century.

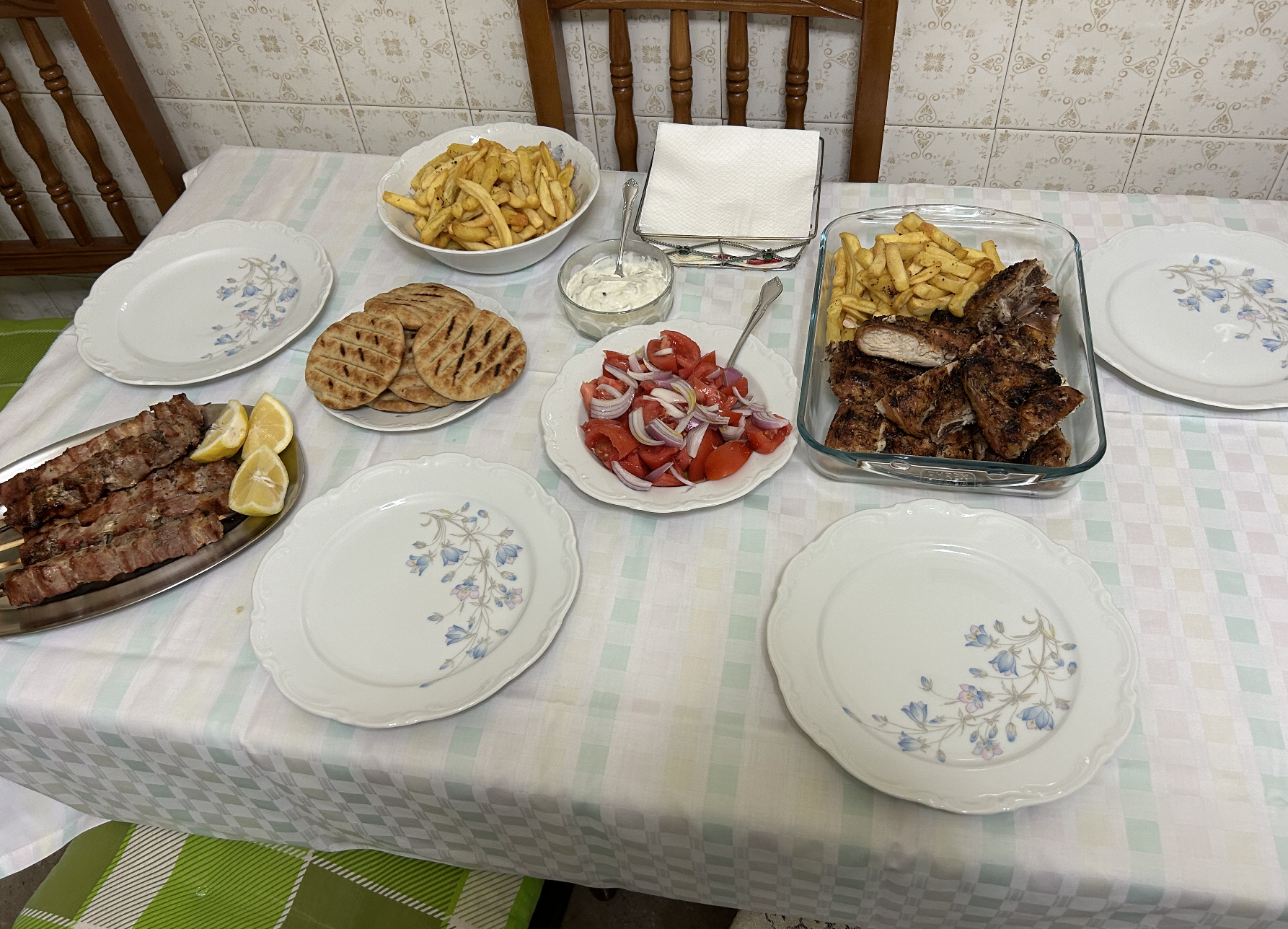
A traditional table with Greek food ordered from a taverna/ souvlatzidiko

== Food and culture ==
As Marpissa is a traditional village, almost all restaurants and shops retain a traditional white color, as well as offering traditional goods (traditional dishes and traditional clothing).

The local residents live quite traditional lives, wearing traditional clothing, as well as eating traditional Greek food (and observing cultural traditions such as fasting for lent).

== Places of interest ==
Marpissa has been characterised as a traditional settlement, with many houses dating from the 17th and 18th century. In the central square of the village lie four windmills. The village is home of Perantinos Sculpture Museum and a Folklore Museum. On top Kastellos hill, at the location of the ruined castle, lies the monastery of Saint Antonios.

== Traditions ==
During the Holy Week in Marpissa takes place a reenactment of the Passion of Jesus.
