= Paros (disambiguation) =

Paros is a Greek island of the Cyclades.

It can also refer to:

- Paros (city), an ancient city located on the island of Paros
- Paros (regional unit), an administrative unit that includes the island of Paros
- Nahapetavan, a town in Armenia formerly known as Paros
- Paroš, a village in Bosnia and Herzegovina
- Paroș, a river in Hunedoara County, Romania
- Paroș, a village in the commune Sălașu de Sus, Hunedoara County, Romania
- Prevention of an Arms Race in Outer Space (PAROS), see list of acronyms: P
- Paros, the initial name of the Greek colony which later changed into Pharos (modern Hvar, Croatia)
- Paraoa, and island in the Tuamotus in French Polynesia
