= Small Santa Maria Beach, Paros Island =

Small Santa Maria Beach Μικρή Σάντα Μαρία Mikri Santa Maria
- Settlement & Beach
- Beach Location in Paros Island Greece
- Coordinates: 37.1382695°N 25.2874736°E
- Country: Greece
- Time zone: UTC+2 (EET)
  - Summer (DST): UTC+3 (EEST)
- Postal code: 84401

Small Santa Maria Beach (Greek: Μικρή Σάντα Μαρία, Mikrí Santa María) is a sandy beach located on the northeastern coast of the island of Paros, in the Cyclades, Greece. It is situated immediately north of Santa Maria Beach and forms part of the wider Santa Maria coastal area.

== Geography and environment ==
Small Santa Maria Beach is located in the area of Plastira, approximately 6 kilometres (3.7 mi) northeast of the coastal town of Naousa and about 16 kilometres (9.9 mi) northeast of Parikia, the capital and main port of Paros. The beach forms part of the Santa Maria coastal area and faces the Aegean Sea, with views toward the nearby island of Naxos.

The beach consists of a small, sheltered bay with a sandy shoreline and shallow waters. Its location provides some protection from strong northerly winds, known as meltemi, which affect the Cyclades during the summer months. The coastline includes rocky formations, while the clear waters and seabed conditions are used for recreational activities such as swimming and snorkeling.

== Public access and regulation ==
In 2023, Small Santa Maria Beach, along with other beaches in Greece, was mentioned in national media coverage during discussions concerning the regulation of commercial activities on beaches and the enforcement of public access rules. Following public reactions, inspections were carried out on beaches in Paros, Naxos and Rhodes regarding the use of coastal areas. Later that year, measures were taken at Small Santa Maria Beach, resulting in the removal of part of the beach equipment and the release of a larger area of the shoreline for public use.

=== Facilities and access ===
During the summer season, Small Santa Maria Beach operates with organized facilities, including sunbeds, umbrellas and seasonal restaurant with food and beverage services. Compared with the adjacent Santa Maria Beach, it is smaller in size and has a more limited scale of facilities.

The beach is accessible by road from Naoussa and other settlements in northern Paros, with parking areas available in the surrounding area.
