= MS Express Samina sinking =

2000 maritime incident in Greece

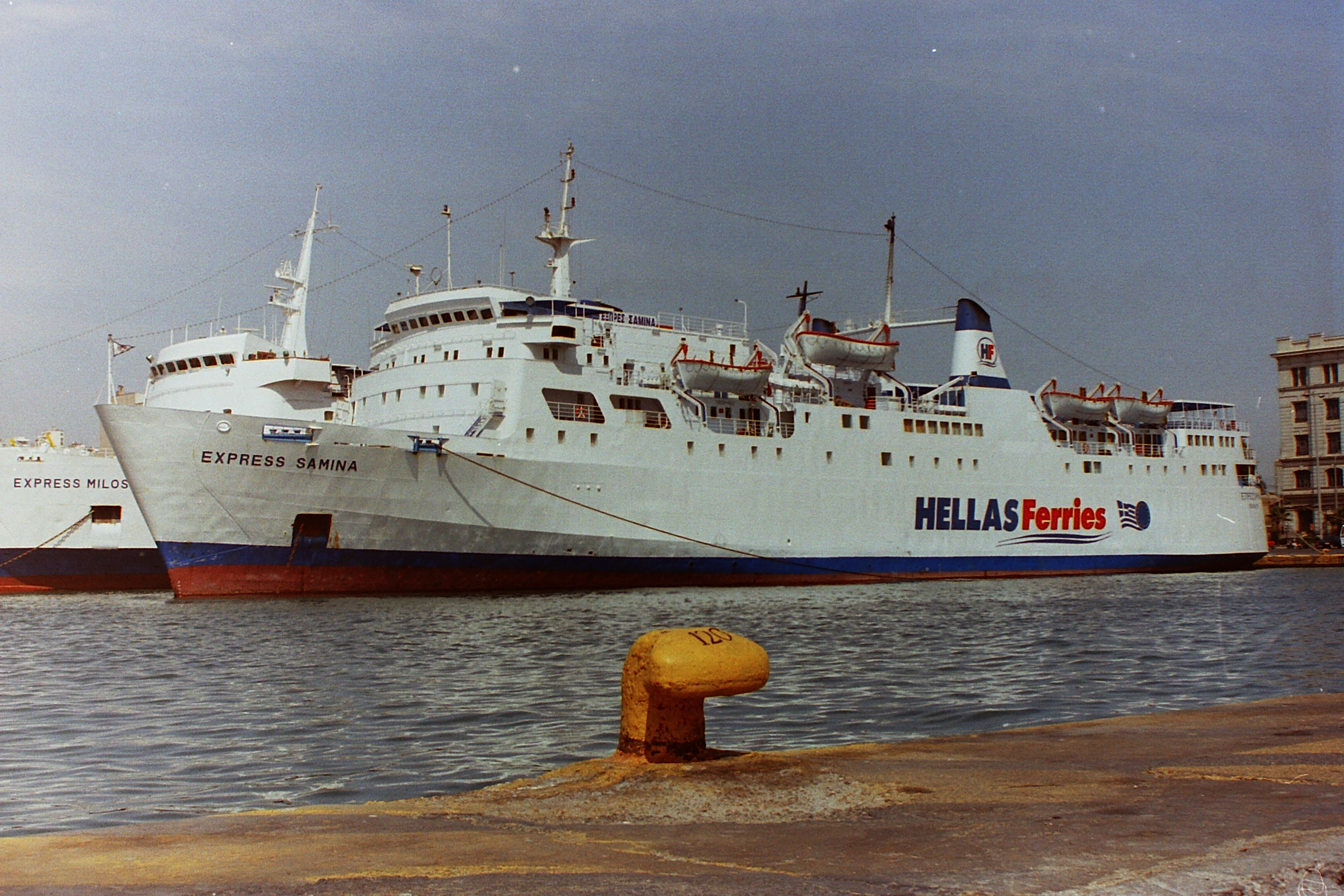
- MS Express Samina in 2000

Details
- Date: September 26, 2000; 22:12
- Location: Off the coast of Paros, Greece 37.06°N 25.05°E
- Operator: Minoan Flying Dolphins
- Owner: Minoan Flying Dolphins
- Cause: Collision with rock formation due to human error

Statistics
- Passengers: 473
- Crew: 61
- Deaths: 81 (75 passengers, 5 crew members, including one not on ship)

On September 26, 2000, the passenger ferry MS Express Samina struck the Portes islets (referred to as the "Gates of Paros"), two 25-meter (82 ft) high rock formations off the bay of Parikia, 5 kilometers (3.1 mi) from the port of Paros, while on a cruise. The impact created two gashes in the ship's hull. She then capsized, killing 80 of the passengers and crew. It was the second deadliest ship disaster in Greek history, the first being the 1966 sinking of Iraklion.

== Passengers and crew ==
Express Samina was carrying 473 passengers on a cruise to the Greek island of Paros. She was also carrying 61 crew members, including captain Vassilis Giannakis and first mate Tassos Psychoyios. Express Samina was built in 1966, making it 34 years old at the time, well beyond the scrap-by date of 27 years set by several European countries. Greece, however, had extended this limit to 35.

== Incident ==
Express Samina left the Port of Piraeus in the early evening with a 5-hour journey to the island of Paros. The journey was uneventful for the first two hours until a severe storm appeared, with strong winds creating giant waves that tossed the ship back and forth. To counteract the bucking motion caused by the waves, the crew deployed the stabilizers at the stern in hopes of creating a smoother ride for the passengers.

At 22:12 local time, the ship slammed into the Portes islets, creating a giant gash in the top section of the starboard side of the hull. The ship then slammed into the rocks again, creating another gash in the bottom section of the hull. Water quickly filled the hull, first filling the bottom gash. The ship began to tip gradually onto her starboard side. When the list of the ship reached 23 degrees, the top gash made contact with the water's surface and the ship went beyond the point of no return. Panic ensued amongst the passengers, who quickly scrambled for the lifeboats. Due to the strong winds, the inflatable boats were easily blown away, so the solid lifeboats were the only option. However, only four of the 20 lifeboats were deployed because the damage to the ship prevented the launch of additional boats.

At 23:01 (as evidenced by a stopped clock in the control room), the ship sank below the waves. 80 of the passengers and crew died. In addition, Dimitris Malamas, the port-master who was helping with the rescue operation, died of a heart attack due to the stress of the rescue, becoming the first fatality of the disaster.

== Investigation ==
The investigation found several factors that contributed to the disaster. The ship's crew became distracted by watching a football match on television and left the ship on autopilot, not monitoring its course. The crew only deployed one of the ship's stabilizers instead of both, causing the ship to veer to the right and crash into the islets. The gash at the top of the ship's hull was above the water level and would not have posed a problem, possibly avoiding the disaster. However, the second impact with the islets caused the stabilizer to slice through the hull, which created the second gash below the water level and near the engine room.

Water filled the engine room and shut down the generators, cutting off power to the entire ship. However, despite all the damage, the ship could still have remained afloat. Regulations require that doors between ship compartments remain closed at all times, but the crew left them open, allowing water to spread beyond the engine room and into other parts of the ship. The combination of these factors caused the ship to capsize quickly.

The ferry had a roll-on/roll-off design with a large compartment for vehicles. It is believed that this design also contributed to the ship's sinking, since ships without this are less likely to sink. The crew's failure to assist the passengers also contributed to the high death toll.

== Aftermath ==
After the sinking, responsibility ultimately fell on the company that owned the Express Samina, Minoan Flying Dolphins, and its owner, Pandelis Sfinias. Sfinias faced criminal negligence and manslaughter charges from the fatalities caused by the disaster. Two months later, Sfinias committed suicide by jumping from the sixth floor of the company office in Athens. The Express Samina's crew members also faced charges of manslaughter and negligence for their failure to aid in the evacuation of the ship. The captain was sentenced to 16 years in prison, while the first mate received 19 years. Other crew members of the Express Samina and representatives of Minoan Flying Dolphins received lighter sentences.

As a result of the disaster, voyage recorders (similar to an aircraft's black box) were made mandatory in all passenger ferries. In addition, the end of a ship's working life was reduced from 35 to 30 years.

== In popular culture ==
The accident was featured on season 3 episode 12 of the Canadian television series Mayday, titled "Collision Course".
