= Marpessa (Paros) =

Ancient Greek town on Paros

Marpessa (Ancient Greek: Μάρπησσα) was a town of ancient Greece on the island of Paros.

Although it was likely associated with Mount Marpessa, its site is unlocated.
