= Panagia Ekatontapiliani =

Historic Byzantine church complex in Parikia on the island of Paros in Greece

Coordinates: 37°05′06″N 25°09′06″E

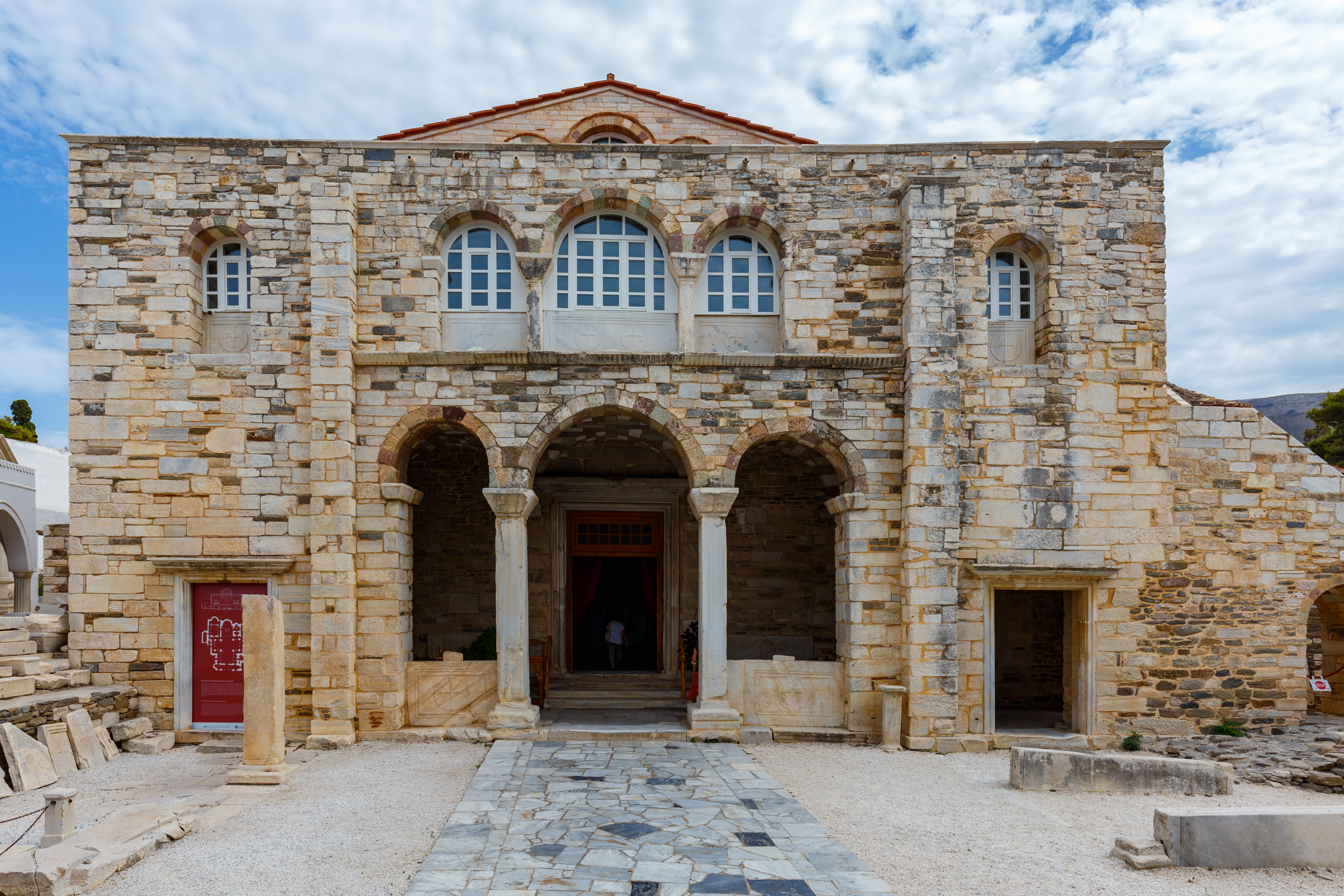
Exterior view of the main church

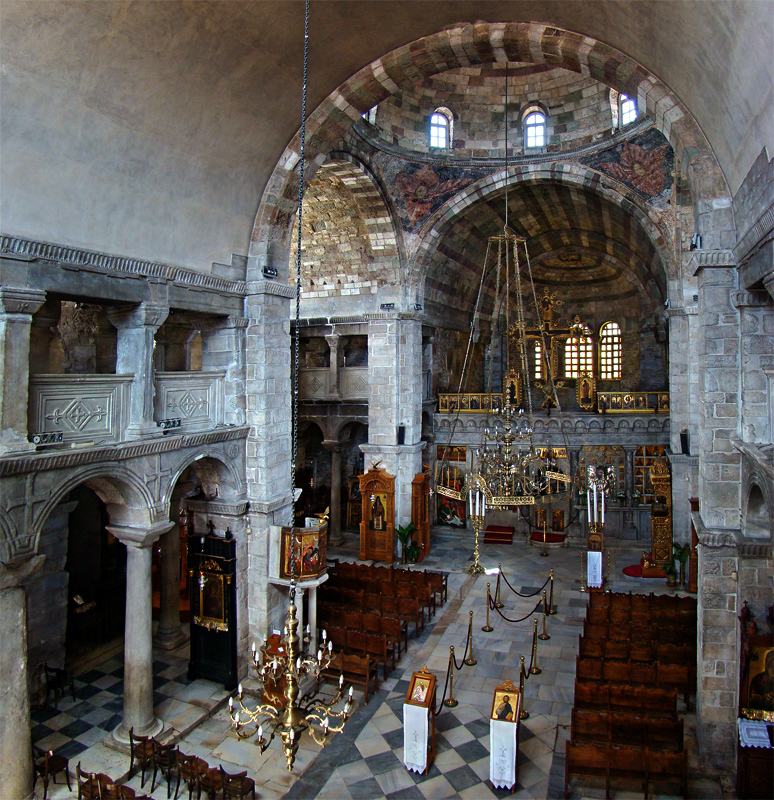
View of the interior

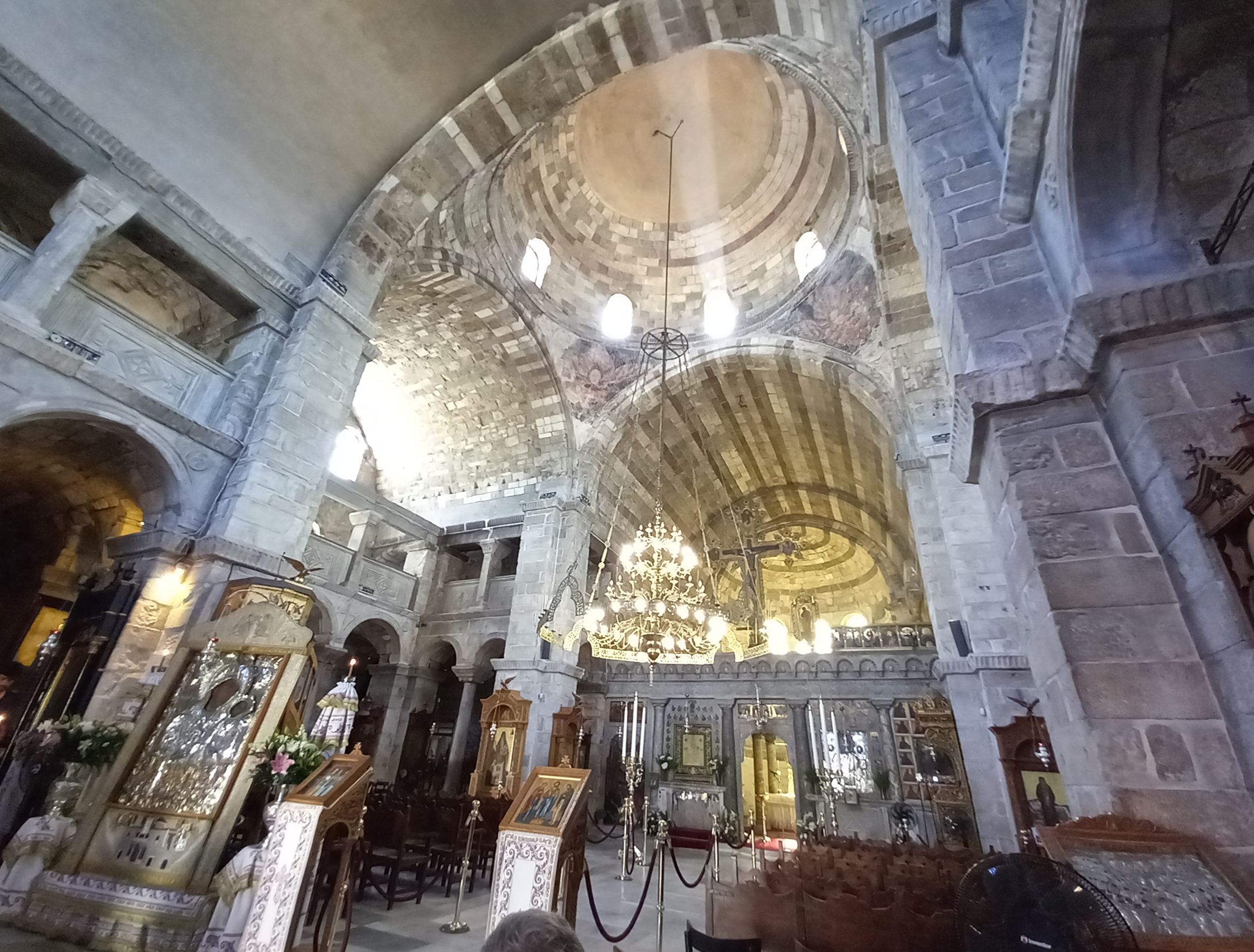
View of the interior

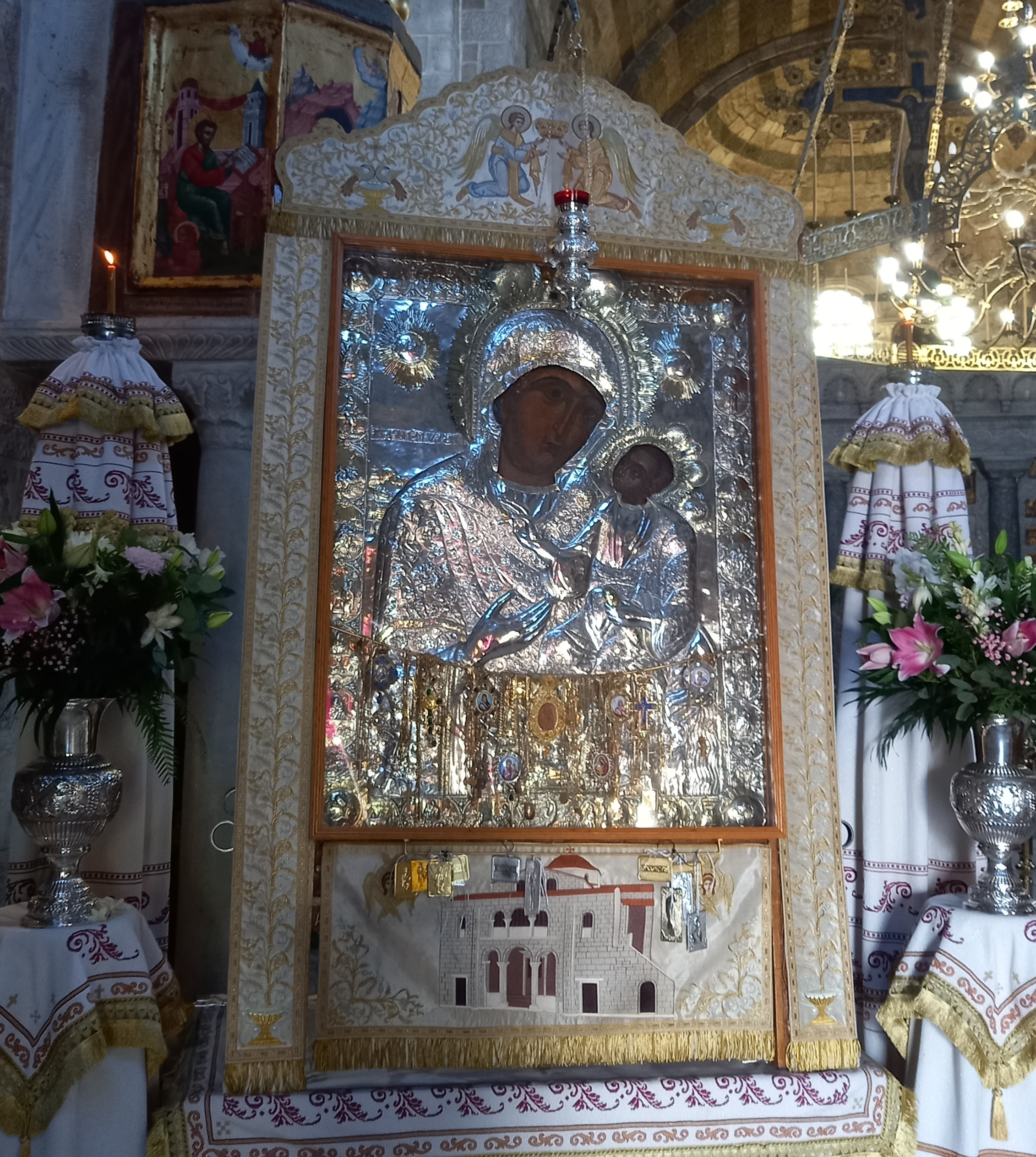
Holly icon of Panagia Ekatontapiliani

Panagia Ekatontapiliani (Greek: Παναγία η Εκατονταπυλιανή); literally the church with 100 gates) or Panagia Katapoliani (Greek: Παναγία η Καταπολιανή) is a historic Byzantine church complex in Parikia town, on the island of Paros in Greece. The church complex contains a main chapel surrounded by two more chapels and a baptistery with a cruciform font.

The origin of the church's name is obscure, as it does not have one hundred doors, or gates. One theory suggests that it is a corruption of the name "Katapoliani", i.e. "Lower Town church", as it lies by the sea in the lower part of the town of Parikia.

== History ==
The church dates to 326. Its oldest features likely predate the adoption of Christianity as the state religion of the Roman Empire in 391. The church was purportedly founded by the mother of the Roman Emperor Constantine the Great (ruled 306–337), Saint Helen, during her pilgrimage to the Holy Land when she stopped to worship at a chapel on the island.

Later Justinian is credited for initiating construction on the site as well. The site was badly damaged by an earthquake in the 18th century, but gradually restored. The Ekatontapyliani is a renowned Marian pilgrimage church of the Aegean, second only to the famed Megalochare church on nearby Tinos Island.

== Legend ==
Although the name Ekatontapiliani means the Church with the Hundred Doors, it only has 99 at the moment. Legend has it that the church contains 99 known doors, plus a secret door that is hidden. It is believed that the hundredth door will open once the church of Hagia Sofia in Constantinople becomes an Orthodox Church again.
