= Cabarnus =

Character in Greek mythology

Cabarnus (Ancient Greek: Κάβαρνος) was a figure of Greek mythology who was said to have been from the island of Paros, and was the reason the island of Paros was said to have been also called "Cabarnis".

Cabarnus revealed to the Greek goddess Demeter the fact that her daughter had been abducted by Hades. The Greek grammarian Hesychius of Alexandria wrote that, in Paros, "Cabarnus" was the name for any priest of Demeter.
