= Satyros =

Greek architect in the 4th century BC

Satyros or Satyrus (Ancient Greek: Σάτυρος) was a Greek architect and sculptor from Paros, active in the 4th century BCE. Very little information about his life remains, even though he designed one of the major monuments of the ancient world.

Along with Pythius of Priene, he was commissioned by Artemisia II of Caria to design the tomb of her husband Mausolus at Halicarnassus (modern Bodrum, Turkey). This monument became known as the Mausoleum at Halicarnassus, one of the Seven Wonders of the Ancient World.

Pythius and Satyros wrote a treatise about the monument, none of the text of which seems to have survived. Satyros may have sculpted some of the decoration of the Mausoleum as well.
