= Paros (city) =

Town of ancient Greece

Coordinates: 37°05′04″N 25°08′54″E

Paros or Parus (Ancient Greek: Πάρος) was a town of ancient Greece on the island of Paros.

Its site is located near modern Parikia.
