= Naousa, Paros =

Naousa Νάουσα
- Community
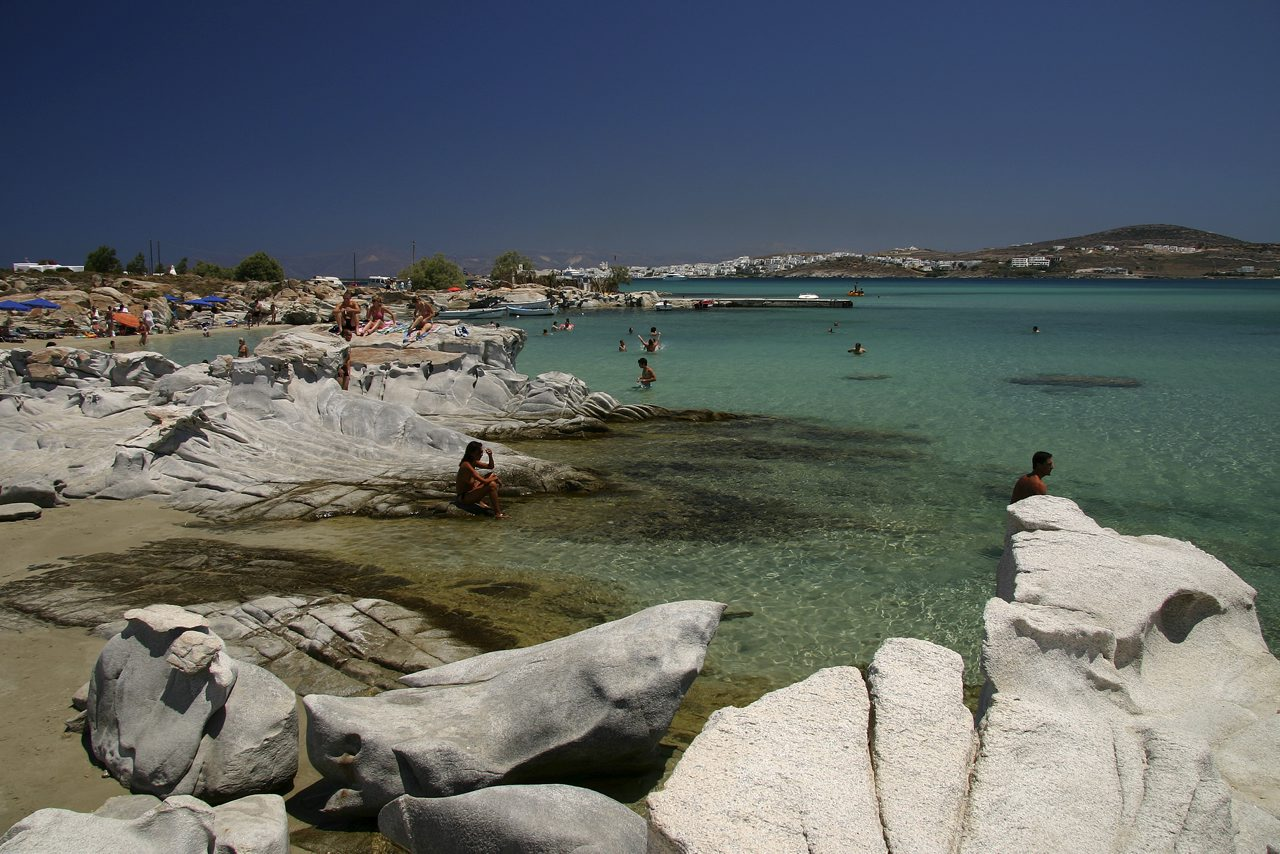
- A view towards Naousa from Kolympithres beach

- Location within Greece
- Coordinates: 37°7′22″N 25°14′24″E
- Country: Greece
- Administrative region: South Aegean
- Regional unit: Paros
- Municipality: Paros

Population (2021)
  - Community: 3,134
- Time zone: UTC+2 (EET)
  - Summer (DST): UTC+3 (EEST)

Naousa (Greek: Νάουσα) is a fishing village and community in the Cyclades. It is located in the northeastern corner of the island of Paros, and it has a population of 3,134 (2021).

In the summer Naousa attracts many tourists from all around Europe because of the climate and the nearby beaches, like Kolympithres. During the winter, it is cold and occasionally snowy.

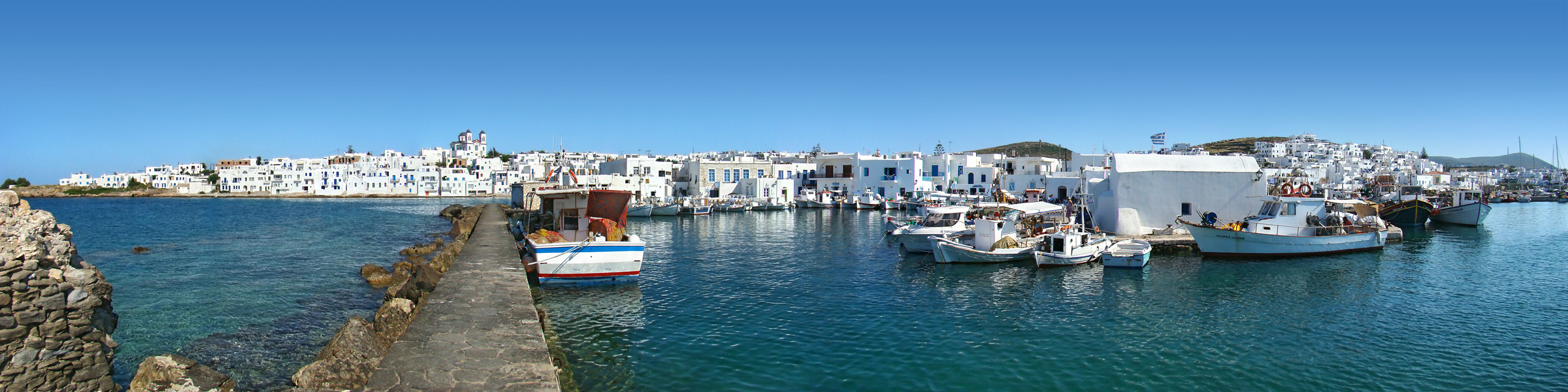
Naousa

== History ==
Naousa was founded by Venetians around the late 14th century. A fortress was built early on to protect the fledgling port, the partial remains of which still exist today. In 1770–1775, during the Russo-Turkish War of 1768–1774 and the Orlov Revolt, Naousa was a Russian naval base, known in Russian as Auza, and the administrative centre of Alexey Orlov's military expedition.
