= Paros =

Greek island in the Aegean Sea

Paros Πάρος
- Municipality
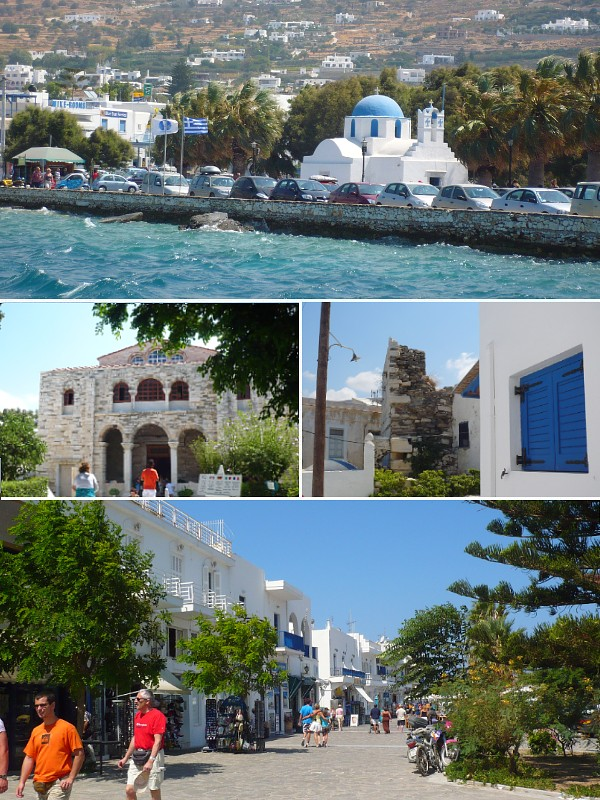
- From top left: Parikia, Panagia Ekatontapiliani, the Frankish Castle and a typical Paros street

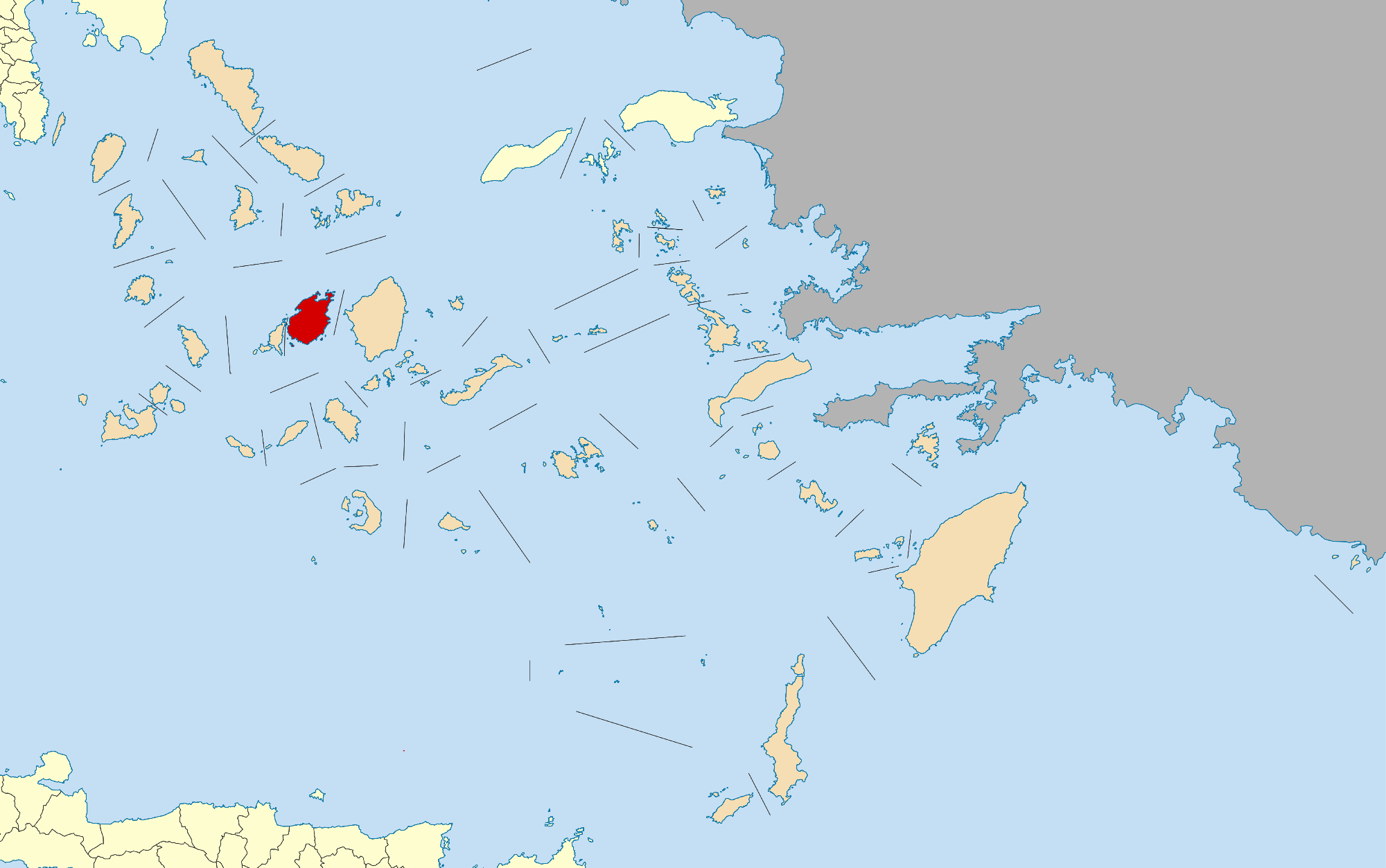

- Location within Greece
- Coordinates: 37°4′N 25°12′E
- Country: Greece
- Administrative region: South Aegean
- Regional unit: Paros
- Seat: Parikia

Area
  - Municipality: 196.3 km^{2} (75.8 sq mi)
- Highest elevation: 724 m (2,375 ft)
- Lowest elevation: 0 m (0 ft)

Population (2021)
  - Municipality: 14,520
  - Density: 73.97/km^{2} (191.6/sq mi)
  - Community: 6,204
- Demonym: Parian
- Time zone: UTC+2 (EET)
  - Summer (DST): UTC+3 (EEST)
- Postal code: 844 00
- Area code: 22840
- Vehicle registration: EM
- Website: www.paros.gr

Paros (/ˈpɛərɒs/; Greek: Πάρος [ˈparos]; Venetian: Paro) is a Greek island in the central Aegean Sea and part of the Cyclades island group. It lies 8 kilometers (5 miles) west of Naxos, separated by a narrow channel and about 150 km (93 miles) south-east of Piraeus. The Municipality of Paros covers about 196.308 square kilometres (75.795 sq mi), including numerous uninhabited offshore islets. Its closest neighbor is the municipality of Antiparos, located to the southwest. In ancient Greece, the island was home to the city-state of Paros.

Historically, Paros was known for its fine white marble, which gave rise to the term Parian to describe marble or porcelain of similar qualities. Today, working marble quarries and mines (as well as abandoned ones) can be found on the island, but Paros is primarily known as a popular tourist destination.

== Geography ==
Paros's geographic coordinates are 37° N. latitude, and 25° 10' E. longitude. The area is 165 km^{2} (64 sq mi). Its greatest length from N.E. to S.W. is 21 km (13 mi), and its greatest breadth 16 km (10 mi). The island is of a round, plump-pear shape, formed by a single mountain (724 m (2,375 ft)) sloping evenly down on all sides to a maritime plain, which is broadest on the north-east and south-west sides. The island is composed of marble, though gneiss and mica-schist are to be found in a few places. To the west of Paros lies its smaller sister island Antiparos. At its narrowest, the channel between the two islands is less than 2 km (1 mi) wide. A car-carrying shuttle-ferry operates all day (to and from Pounda, 5 km (3 mi) south of Parikia). In addition a dozen smaller islets surround Paros.

Paros has numerous beaches including Golden Beach (Chrissí Aktí) near Drios on the east coast, at Pounda, Logaras, Piso Livadi, Naousa Bay, Parikia and Agia Irini. The constant strong wind in the strait between Paros and Naxos makes it a favoured windsurfing location. Paros is also a popular tourist destination in the Cyclades, known for its beaches, traditional villages, and cultural events.

=== Islands ===
- Gaidouronisi – north of Xifara
- Portes Island – west of the town of Paros
- Tigani Island – southwest of Paros
- Drionisi – southeast of Paros

== History ==
=== Antiquity ===
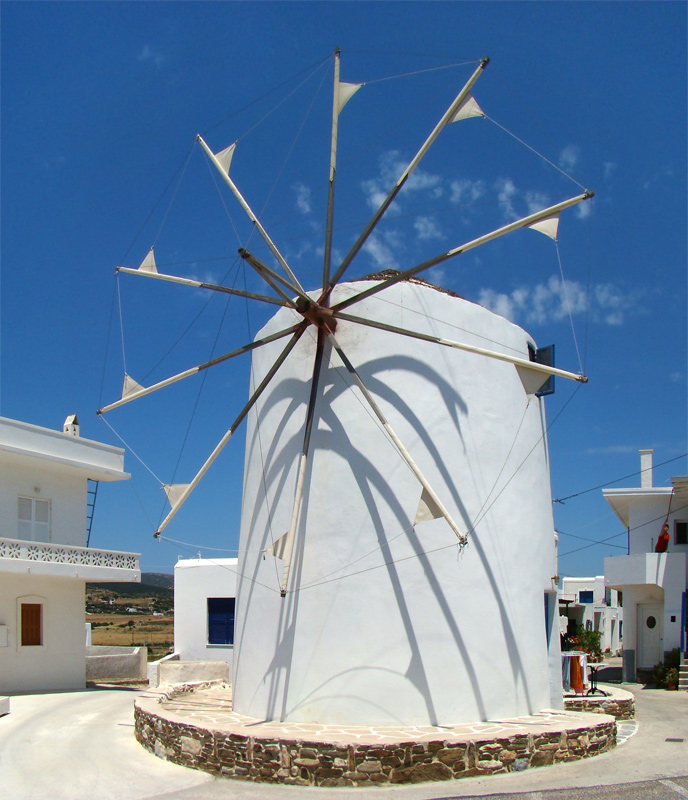
A windmill of the traditional Cyclades design in Marmara.

The story that Paros of Parrhasia colonized the island with Arcadians is an etymological fiction of the type that abounds in Greek legends. Ancient names of the island are said to have been Plateia (or Pactia), Demetrias, Strongyle (meaning round, due to the round shape of the island), Hyria, Hyleessa, Minoa and Cabarnis (after Cabarnus).

The island later received from Athens a colony of Ionians under whom it attained a high degree of prosperity. It sent out colonies to Thasos and Parium on the Hellespont. In the former colony, which was planned in the 15th or 18th Olympiad, the poet Archilochus, a native of Paros, is said to have taken part. As late as 385 BC the Parians, in conjunction with Dionysius of Syracuse, founded a colony on the Illyrian island of Pharos (Hvar).

Shortly before the Persian War, Paros seems to have been a dependency of Naxos. In the first Greco-Persian War (490 BC), Paros sided with the Persians and sent a trireme to Marathon to support them. In retaliation, the capital was besieged by an Athenian fleet under Miltiades, who demanded a fine of 100 talents. The town offered a vigorous resistance, and the Athenians were obliged to sail away after a siege of 26 days, during which they had wasted the island. It was at a temple of Demeter Thesmophoros in Paros that Miltiades received the wound from which he died. By means of an inscription, Ludwig Ross was able to identify the site of the temple; it lies, as Herodotus suggests, on a low hill beyond the boundary of the town.

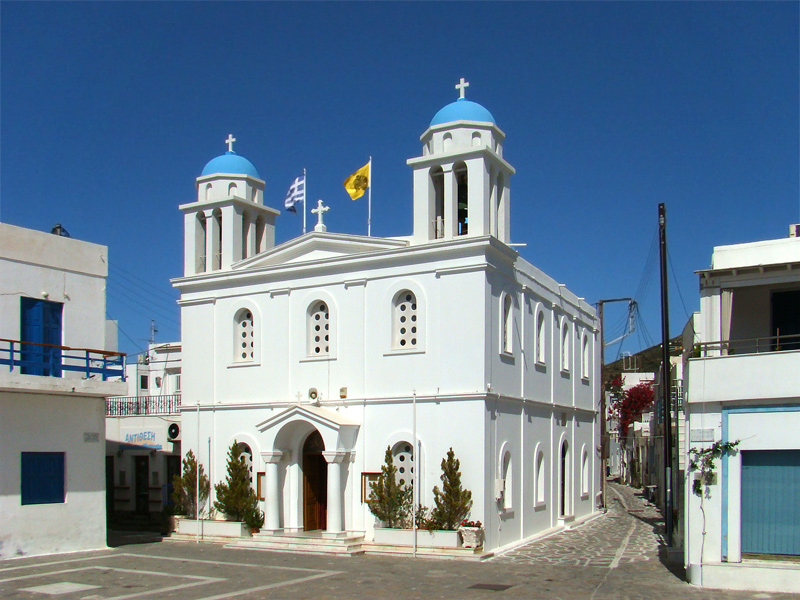
Church of Zoodohos Pigi, Parikia

Paros also sided with Xerxes I of Persia against Greece in the second Greco-Persian War (480–479 BC), but, after the Battle of Artemisium, the Parian contingent remained inactive at Kythnos as they watched the progression of events. For their support of the Persians, the islanders were later punished by the Athenian war leader Themistocles, who exacted a heavy fine.

Under the Delian League, the Athenian-dominated naval confederacy (477–404 BC), Paros paid the highest tribute of the island members: 30 talents annually, according to the estimate of Olympiodorus (429 BC). This implies that Paros was one of the wealthiest islands in the Aegean. Little is known about the constitution of Paros, but inscriptions seem to show that it was modeled on the Athenian democracy, with a boule (senate) at the head of affairs. In 410 BC, Athenian general Theramenes discovered that Paros was governed by an oligarchy; he deposed the oligarchy and restored the democracy. Paros was included in the second Athenian confederacy (the Second Athenian League 378–355 BC). In c. 357 BC, along with Chios, it severed its connection with Athens.

From the inscription of Adule, it is understood that the Cyclades, which are presumed to include Paros, were subjected to the Ptolemies, the Hellenistic dynasty (305–30 BC) that ruled Egypt. Paros then became part of the Roman Empire and later of the Byzantine Empire, its Greek-speaking successor state.

=== Crusades ===
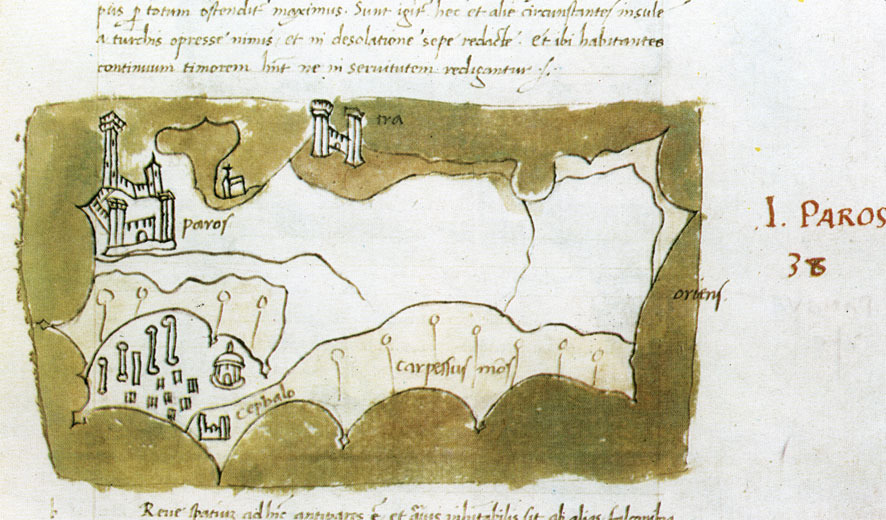
Fifteenth century map by Cristoforo Buondelmonti

In 1204, the soldiers of the Fourth Crusade seized Constantinople and overthrew the Byzantine Empire. Although a residual Byzantine state known as the Empire of Nicaea survived the Crusader onslaught and eventually recovered Constantinople (1261), many of the original Byzantine territories, including Paros, were lost permanently to the crusading powers. Paros became subject to the Duchy of the Archipelago, a fiefdom made up of various Aegean islands ruled by a Venetian duke as nominal vassal of a succession of crusader states. In practice, however, the duchy was always a client state of the Republic of Venice.

=== Ottoman era and independence ===
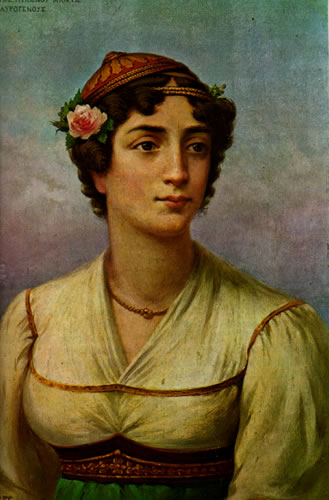
Manto Mavrogenous

In 1537, Paros was conquered by the Ottoman Turks and remained under the Ottoman Empire until the Greek War of Independence (1821–1829). The Ottoman conquest of Paros resulted in atrocities committed against the around 6000 inhabitants: as happened to the population in other islands during the Ottoman conquest of the Aegean islands, old men were killed; young men were made galley slaves; little boys were made janissaries; and the women were ordered to dance on the shore so that the conquerors could choose the most attractive for the lieutenants.

During the Russo-Turkish War (1768–1774) in 1770–1775 Naoussa Bay was the home base for the Russian Archipelago Squadron of Count Alexey Orlov. Under the Treaty of Constantinople (1832), Paros became part of the newly independent Kingdom of Greece, the first time the Parians had been ruled by fellow Greeks for over six centuries. At this time, Paros became the home of a heroine of the nationalist movement, Manto Mavrogenous, who had both financed and fought in the war for independence. Her house, near Ekatontapiliani church, is today a historical monument.

=== WWII and Nazi Occupation ===
During the WWII Axis occupation of Greece, Paros was originally occupied by the Italians until 1943. The Nazis then took over the island in 1944 and imposed brutal rule from the beginning.

In 1944, during the German occupation of Paros, the island's strategic importance led to the forced construction of an airfield near the village of Marpissa. The project amassed over 400 forced Greek workers at one point. Local resistance, aided by the Allies, sought to sabotage the project, with Nikolas Stellas, a 23-year-old partisan, emerging as a key figure. Captured by the Germans, Stellas refused to provide any names or information and was therefore publicly hanged, becoming a symbol of resistance. In retaliation, 125 Parians were condemned to execution. However, Major Georg Graf von Merenberg, the German commander, was persuaded by Abbot Philotheos Zervakos to spare them, influenced by Stellas's sacrifice and the abbot's appeal to his humanity.

British commandos and local partisans conducted a successful operation that led to the attack on German forces stationed there. The operation included the sabotage of German communication lines and the abduction of a key German officer. This resistance effort was part of a broader Allied strategy in the Aegean during World War II, contributing to the disruption of German military operations in the region. The airfield constructed by the Germans in Marpissa was later bombed by the British. There are no remains of it today.

=== 21st century ===
On 26 September 2000 the ferry MS Express Samina collided with the Portes islets off the bay of Parikia, killing 82 of those on board.

Starting in the summer of 2023, the island saw protests from locals on many beaches due to government failure to stop beach-side businesses from placing more umbrellas than permitted. The protests saw some success, with the Greek government toughening inspections and implementing fines for businesses who do not abide by the rules.

== Parikia ==
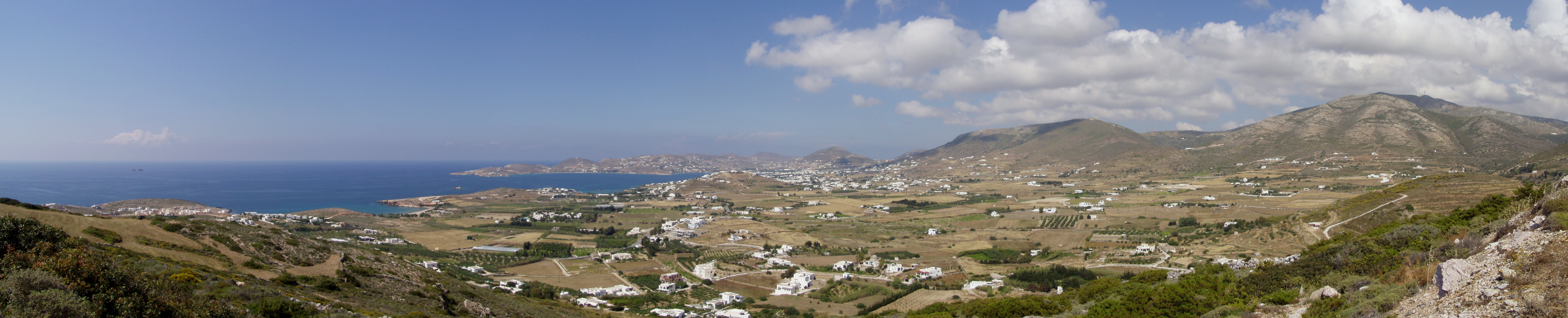
Panoramic view over the bay of Parikia

The capital, Parikia (Greek: παροικία), situated on a bay on the north-west side of the island, occupies the site of the ancient capital Paros. Parikía harbour is a major hub for Aegean islands ferries and catamarans, with several sailings each day for Piraeus, the port of Athens, Heraklion, the capital of Crete, and other islands such as Naxos, Ios, Mykonos, and Santorini.

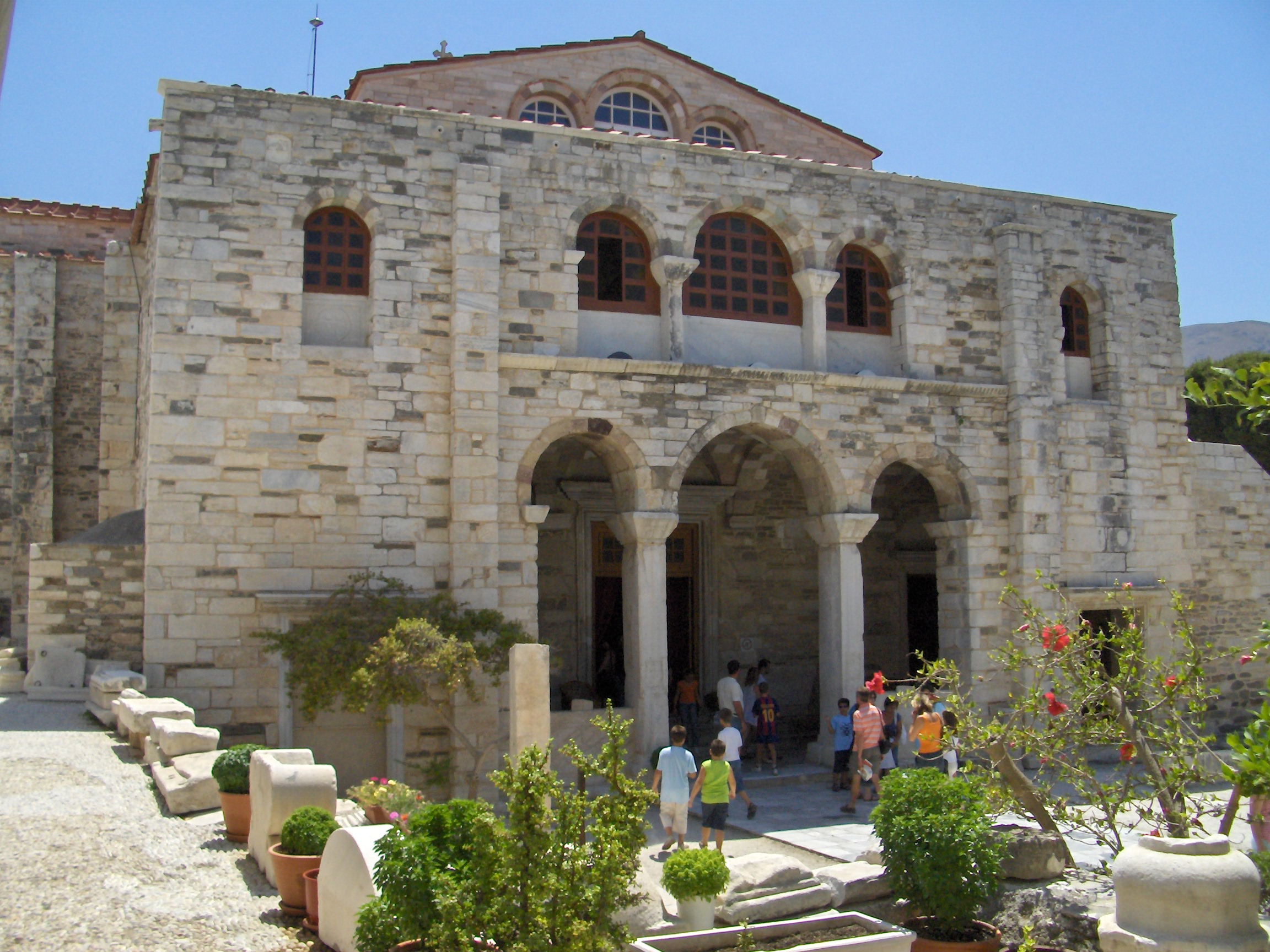
Panagia Ekatontapiliani in Parikia

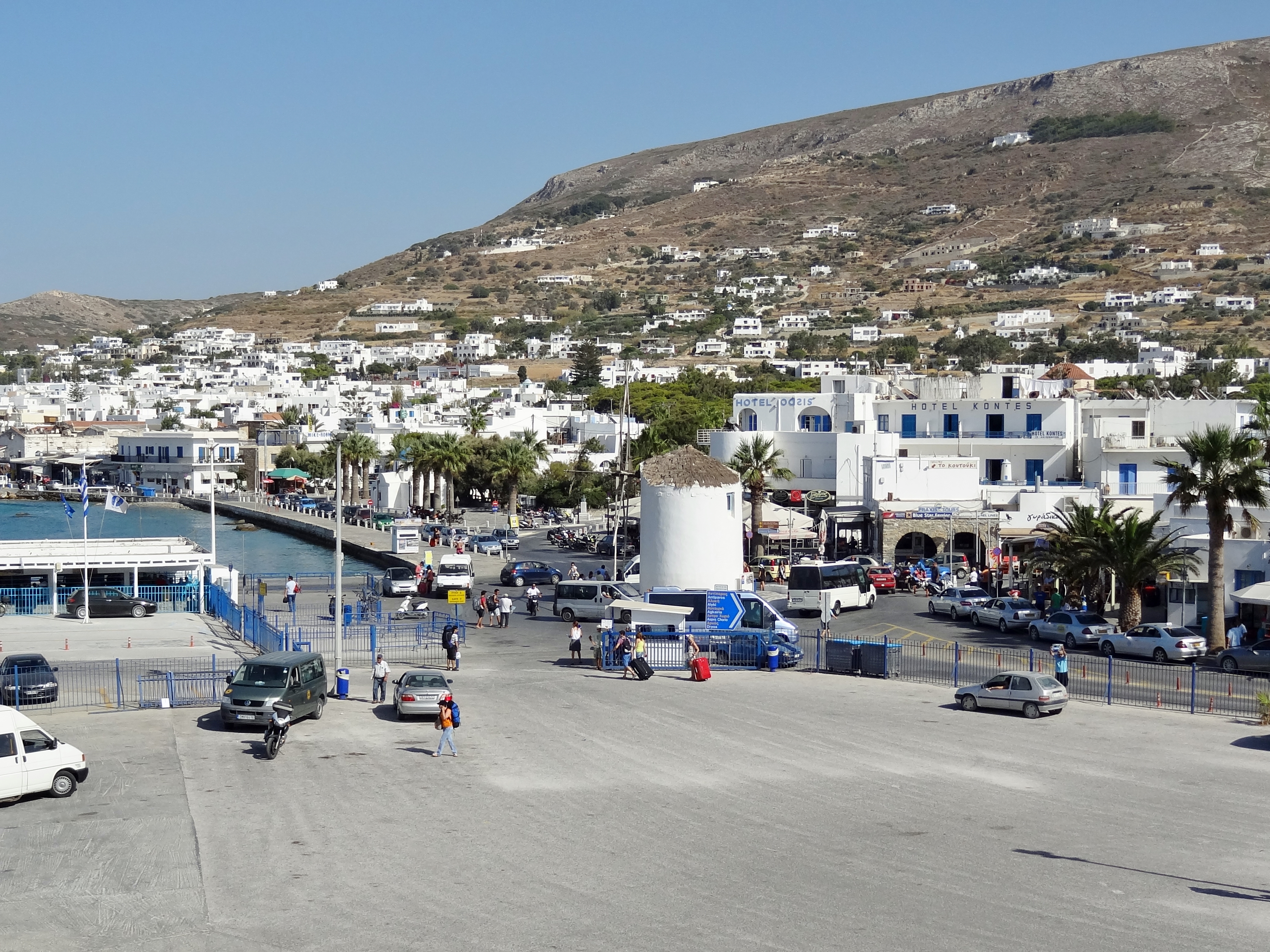
Parikia, Paros

In Parikia town, houses are built and decorated in the traditional Cycladic style, with flat roofs, whitewashed walls and blue-painted doors and window frames and shutters. Shadowed by luxuriant vines, and surrounded by gardens of oranges and pomegranates, the houses give the town a picturesque aspect. Above the central stretch of the seafront road, are the remains of a medieval castle, built almost entirely of the marble remains of an ancient temple dedicated to Apollo. Similar traces of antiquity, in the shape of bas-reliefs, inscriptions, columns, and so on, are numerous. On a hillside in the southern outskirts of Parikia on the left of the Parikia – Alyki road are the remains of a temple dedicated to Asclepius. In addition, close to the modern harbour, the remains of an ancient cemetery are visible, having been discovered recently during non-archaeological excavations.

Back from the port, around 400 m left of Parikia's main square, is the town's principal church, the Panagia Ekatontapiliani, literally meaning "church of the hundred doors". Its oldest features almost certainly predate the adoption of Christianity as the state religion of the Roman Empire in 391. It is said to have been founded by the mother of the Roman Emperor Constantine the Great (ruled 306–337), Saint Helen, during her pilgrimage to the Holy Land. There are two adjoining chapels, one of very early form, and also a baptistery with a cruciform font.

The Archaeological Museum of Paros is located in Parikia town,a small but interesting museum housing some of the many finds from sites in Paros. The best pieces, however, are in the Athens National Archaeological Museum. The Paros museum contains a fragment of the Parian Chronicle, a remarkable chronology of ancient Greece. Inscribed in marble, its entries give time elapsed between key events from the most distant past (1500 BC) down to 264 BC.

== Other settlements ==
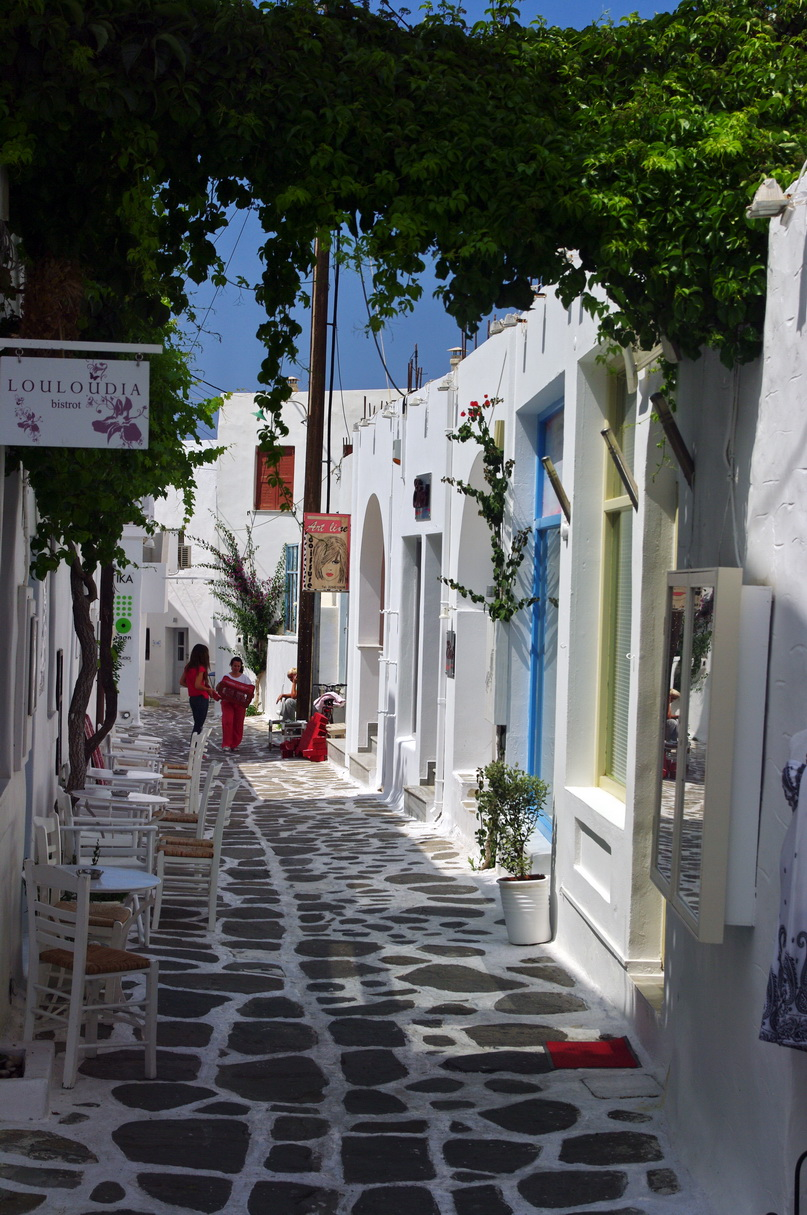
Street of Naousa

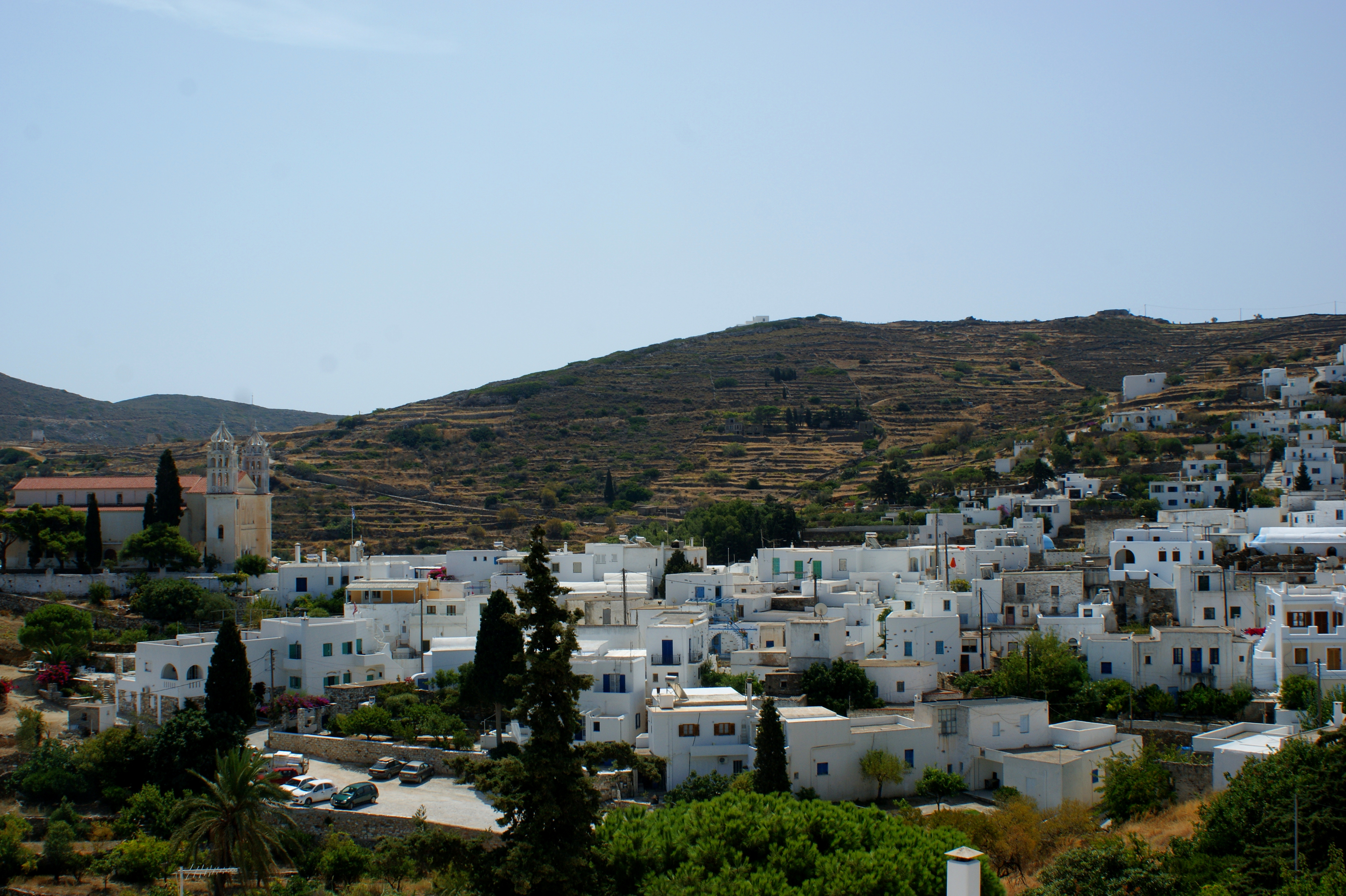
View of Lefkes village

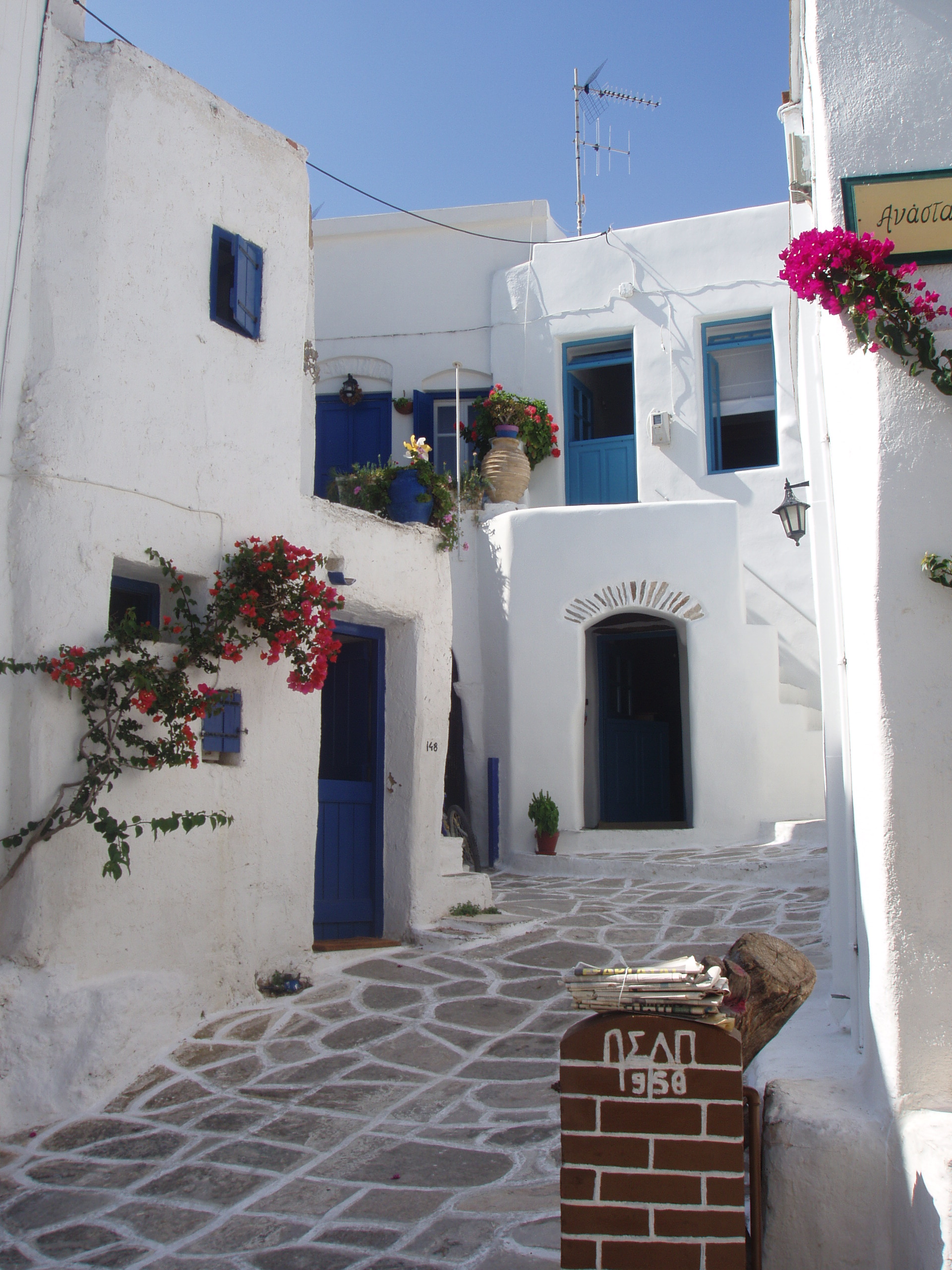
Traditional street of Lefkes

On the north side of the island is the bay of Naoussa (Naussa, formerly Agoussa or Ausa), which provides a natural spacious harbor for boat traffic. In ancient times it was closed by a chain or boom. In modern times it is experiencing great touristic development.

Another popular harbor is that of Drios on the south-east side, where the Turkish fleet used to anchor on its annual voyage through the Aegean during the period of Ottoman rule over Paros (1537–1832).

The three villages of Prodromos (formerly Dragoulas), Marmara, and Marpissa (formerly Tsipidos), situated on an open plain on the eastern side of the island, and rich in remains of antiquity, probably occupy the site of an ancient town. They are known together as the "villages of Kephalos" after the steep and lofty hill of Kephalos. On this hilltop stands the monastery of Agios Antonios (St. Anthony). Around it are the ruins of a medieval castle which belonged in the late Middle Ages to the Venetian noble family of the Venieri which fought a battle against the Turkish admiral Barbarossa in 1537.

Another settlement on the island Paros is Lefkes (Λεύκες). Lefkes is an inland mountain village 10 km (6 mi) away from Parikia. In the late 19th century, Lefkes was the center of the municipality of Iria which belonged to the Province of Naxos until 1912. The name of the municipality Iria was one of the ancient names of Paros. Lefkes was the capital of the municipality Iria which included the villages Angyria or Ageria, Aliki, Aneratzia, Vounia, Kamari, Campos, Langada, Maltes, and Marathi. Iria became Lefkes Community following the law enforcement DNZ/1912 "On Municipalities". At that time, the village managed to achieve great economic development. In the 1970s many residents moved to Athens due to urbanization. However, the last few years, tourism presented to be a new source of income for the locals that led to the reconstruction of homes and landscaping to make it appealing as a tourist destination. Lefkes became part of the municipality of Paros in the Kapodistrias local government reform. In the latest census (2011) the population numbered 545 inhabitants.

== Marble quarries ==
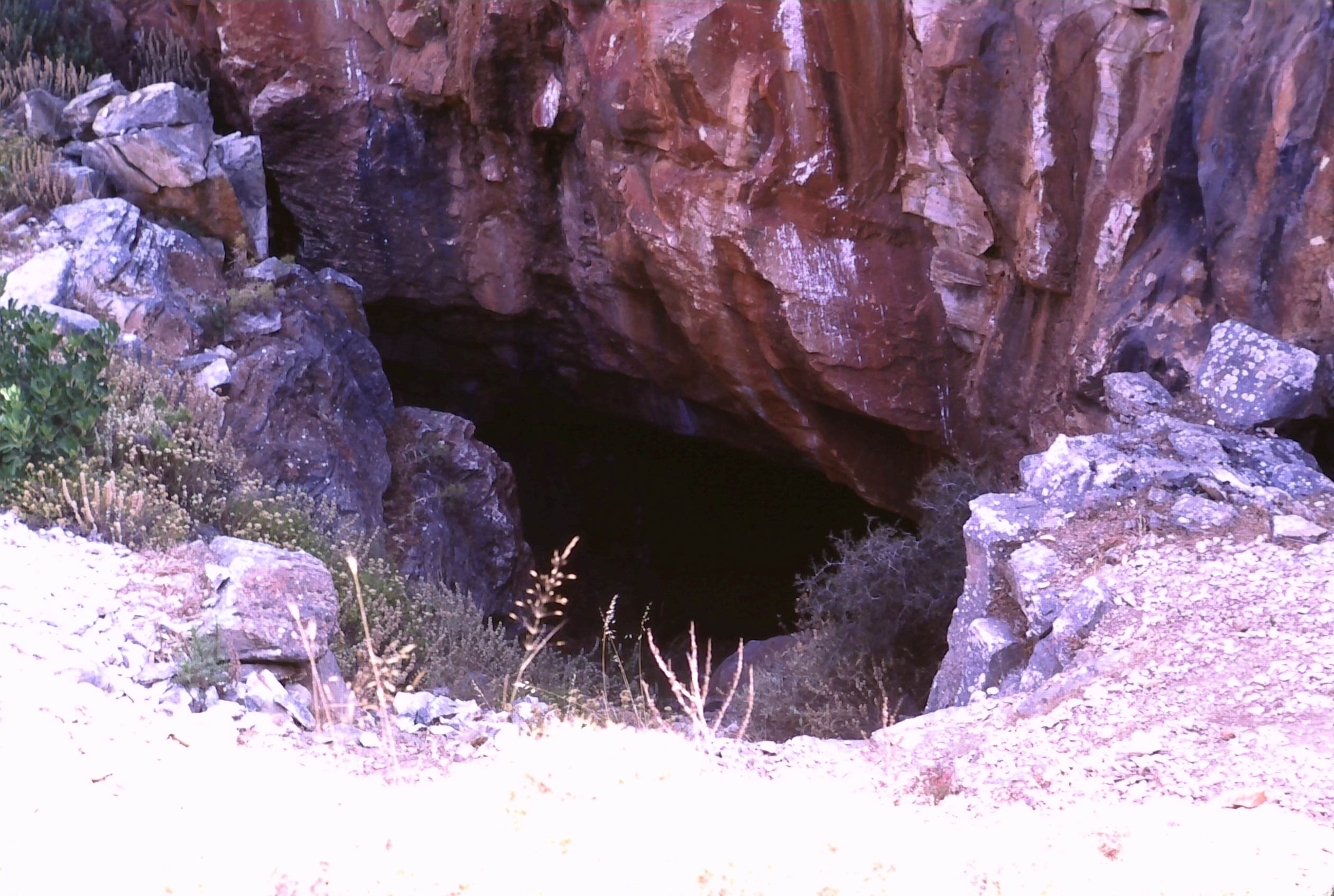
The marble of the Venus de Milo is believed to have been extracted from this 100-metre-long (330 ft) quarry.

Parian marble, which is white and translucent, with a coarse grain and a very beautiful texture, was the chief source of wealth for the island. The celebrated marble quarries lie on the northern side of the mountain anciently known as Marathi (afterwards Capresso), a little below a former convent of St Mina. The marble, which was exported from the 6th century BC onwards, was used by Praxiteles and other ancient Greek sculptors. It was obtained by means of subterranean quarries driven horizontally or at a descending angle into the rock. The marble thus quarried by lamplight was given the name of Lychnites, Lychneus (from lychnos, a lamp), or Lygdos. Several of these tunnels can still be seen. At the entrance to one of them is a bas-relief dedicated to Pan and the nymphs. Several attempts to work the marble have been made in modern times, but it has not been exported in any great quantities. The major part of the remaining white marble is now state-owned and, like its Pentelic counterpart, is only used for archaeological restorations.

In December 1883 these quarries were visited by Theodore and Mabel Bent during their tour of the Cyclades.

== Notable people ==
Ancient

- Agoracritus (5th century BC), sculptor
- Archilochus (c. 680 BC–c. 645 BC), lyric poet
- Aristion of Paros, sculptor of the Phrasikleia Kore
- Satyros (4th century BCE), architect and sculptor
- Scopas (c. 395–350 BC), sculptor and architect
- Theoctiste of Lesbos (9th century), hermit saint
- Thrasymedes (4th century BC), sculptor
- Thymaridas (c. 400 BC–350 BC), mathematician

Modern

- Nicolò Venier, Lord of Paros
- Nurbanu Sultan (1525–1583), wife of Selim II and Haseki Sultan of Ottoman Empire as well as the mother of Murad III and Valide Sultan of the Ottoman Empire. She is also the daughter of Nicolò Venier, Lord of Paros.
- Nicholas Mavrogenes (1738–1790), prince of Wallachia
- Athanasius Parios (1721/22–1813), theologian
- Manto Mavrogenous (1796–1848), heroine in the Greek War of Independence
- Eirene Varoucha-Christodoulopoulou (1896-1979) archaeologist and numismatist, excavated on Paros
- Saint Joseph the Hesychast (1897-1959), monk
- Augoustinos Kantiotes (1907-2010), bishop
- Yiannis Parios (1946-), musician
- Yiannis Ragousis (1965–), politician
- Argyro Barbarigou (1967-), celebrity chef
- Stan (Stratos Antipariotis) (1987-), musician
- Christos Arianoutsos (1993-), footballer

== Gallery ==
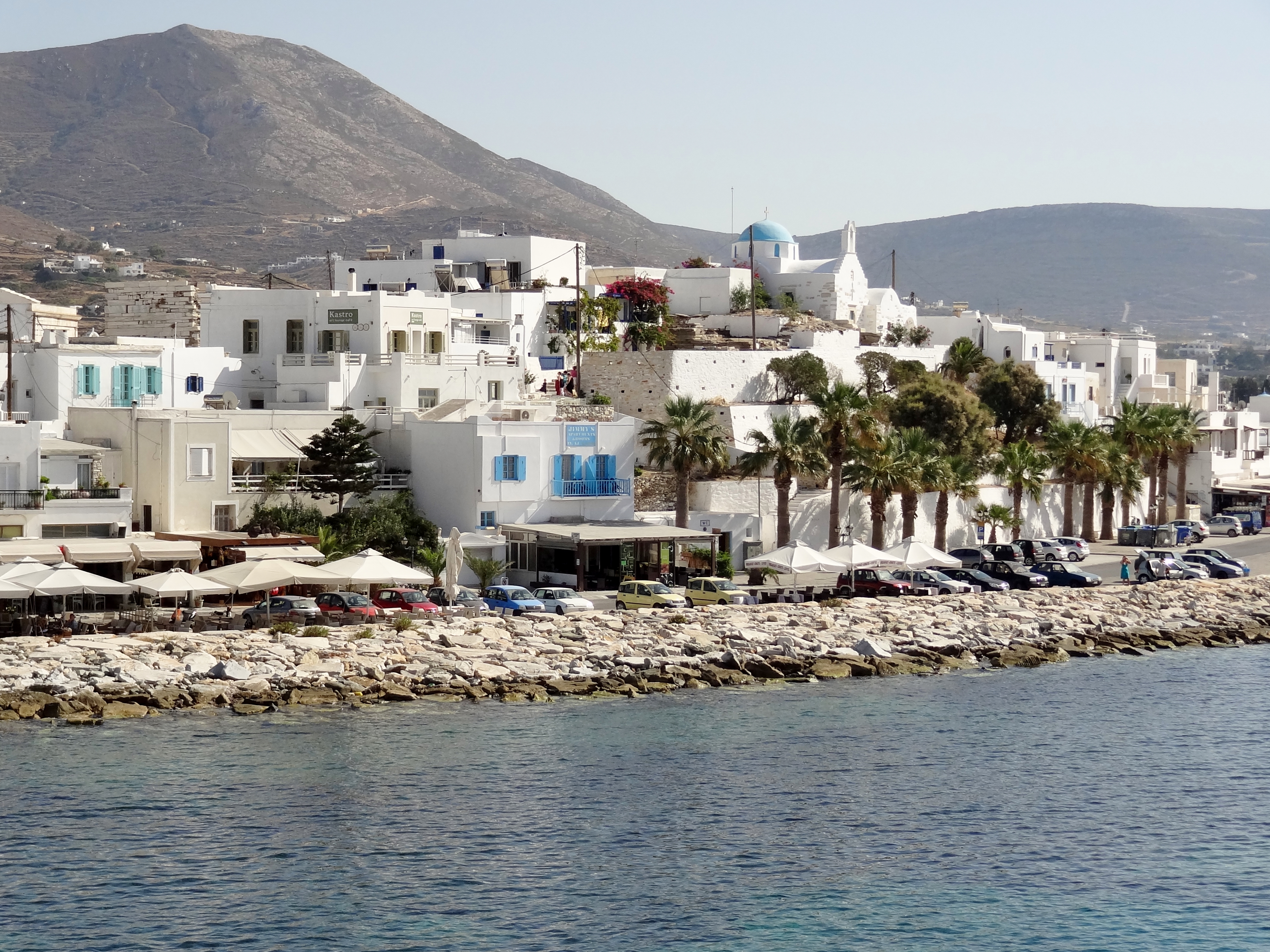
Parikia, Paros with the church of Agios Konstantinos

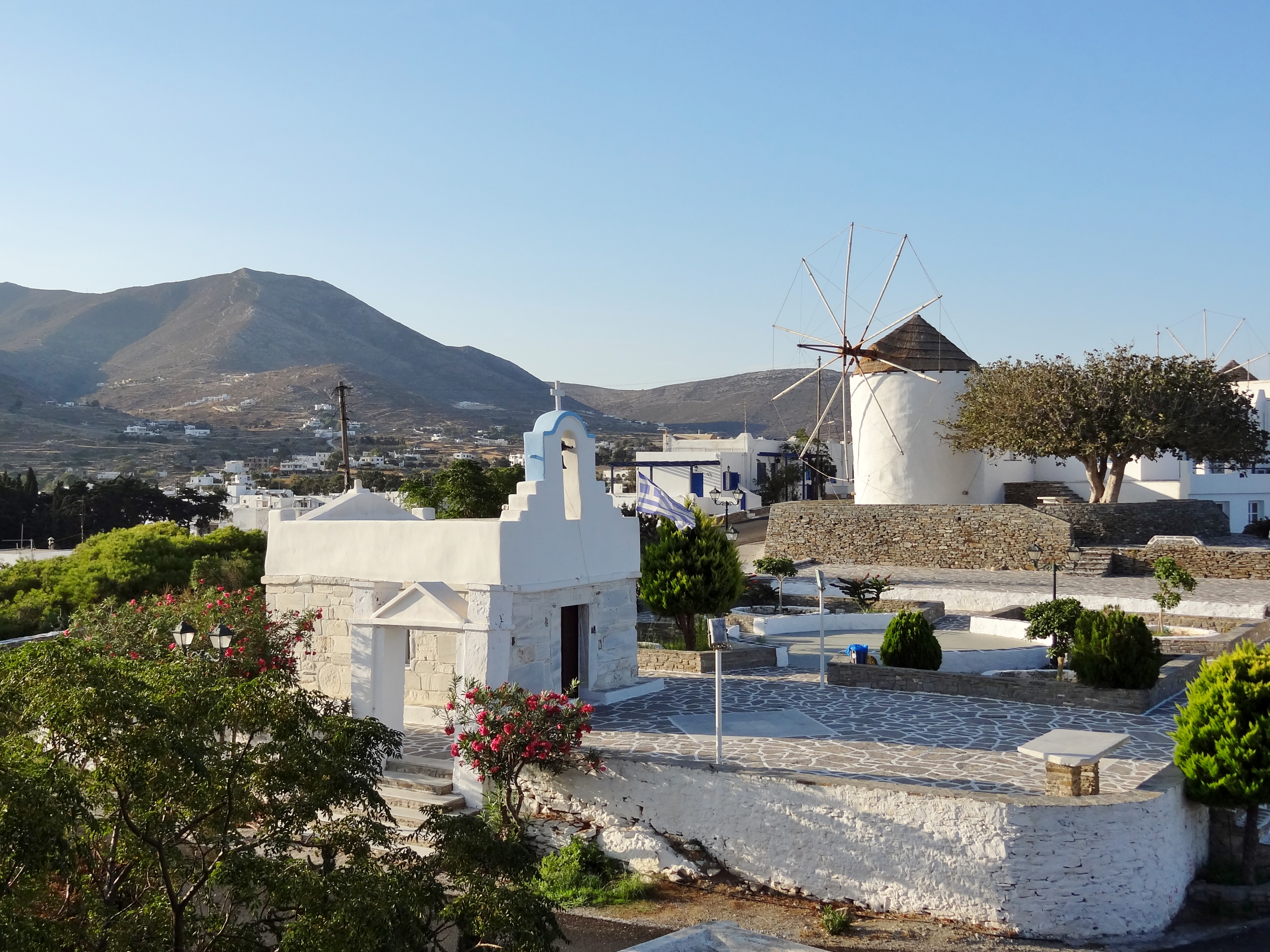
Agia Anna in Parikia, Paros

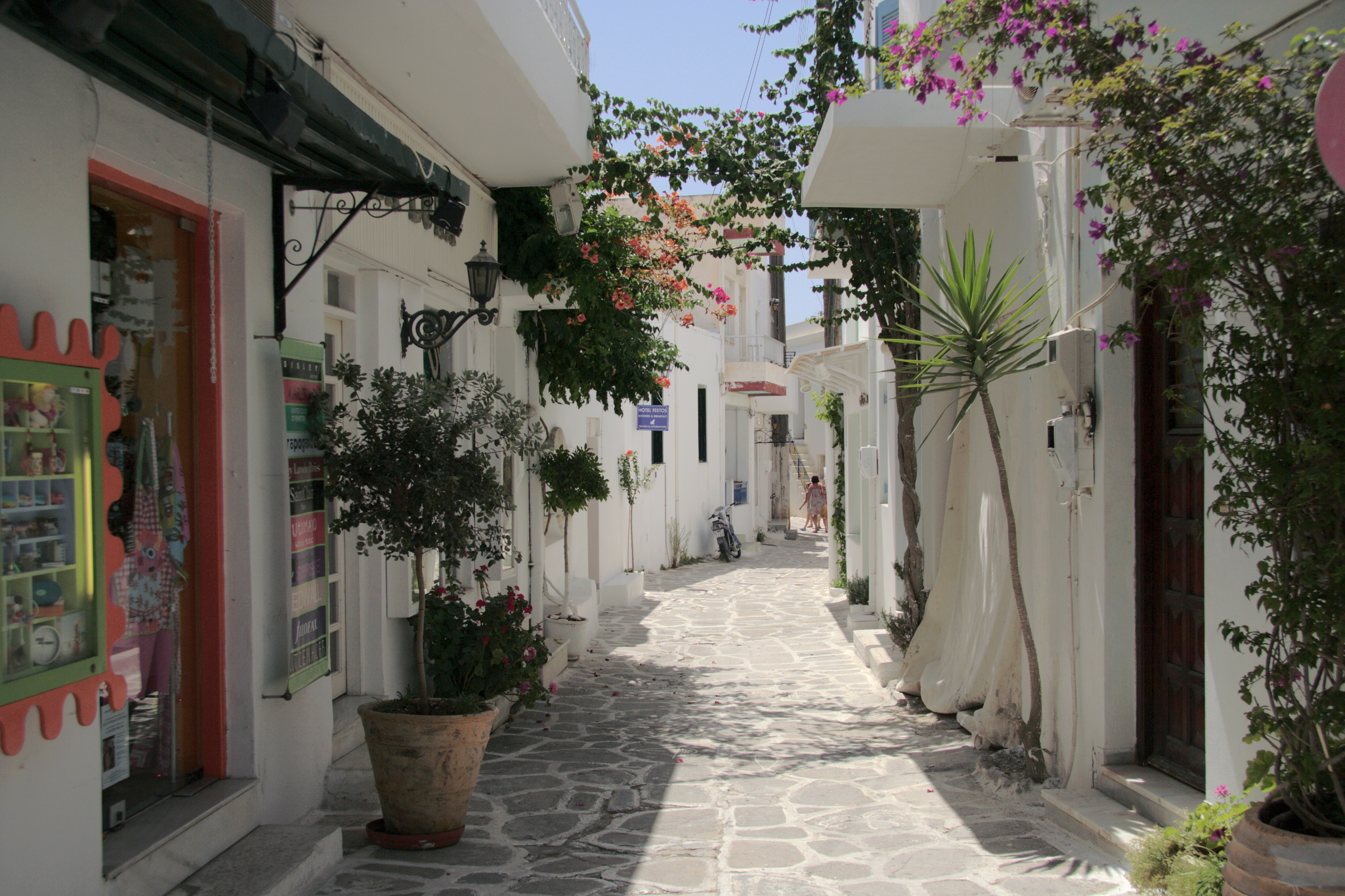
A street in Parikia, Paros

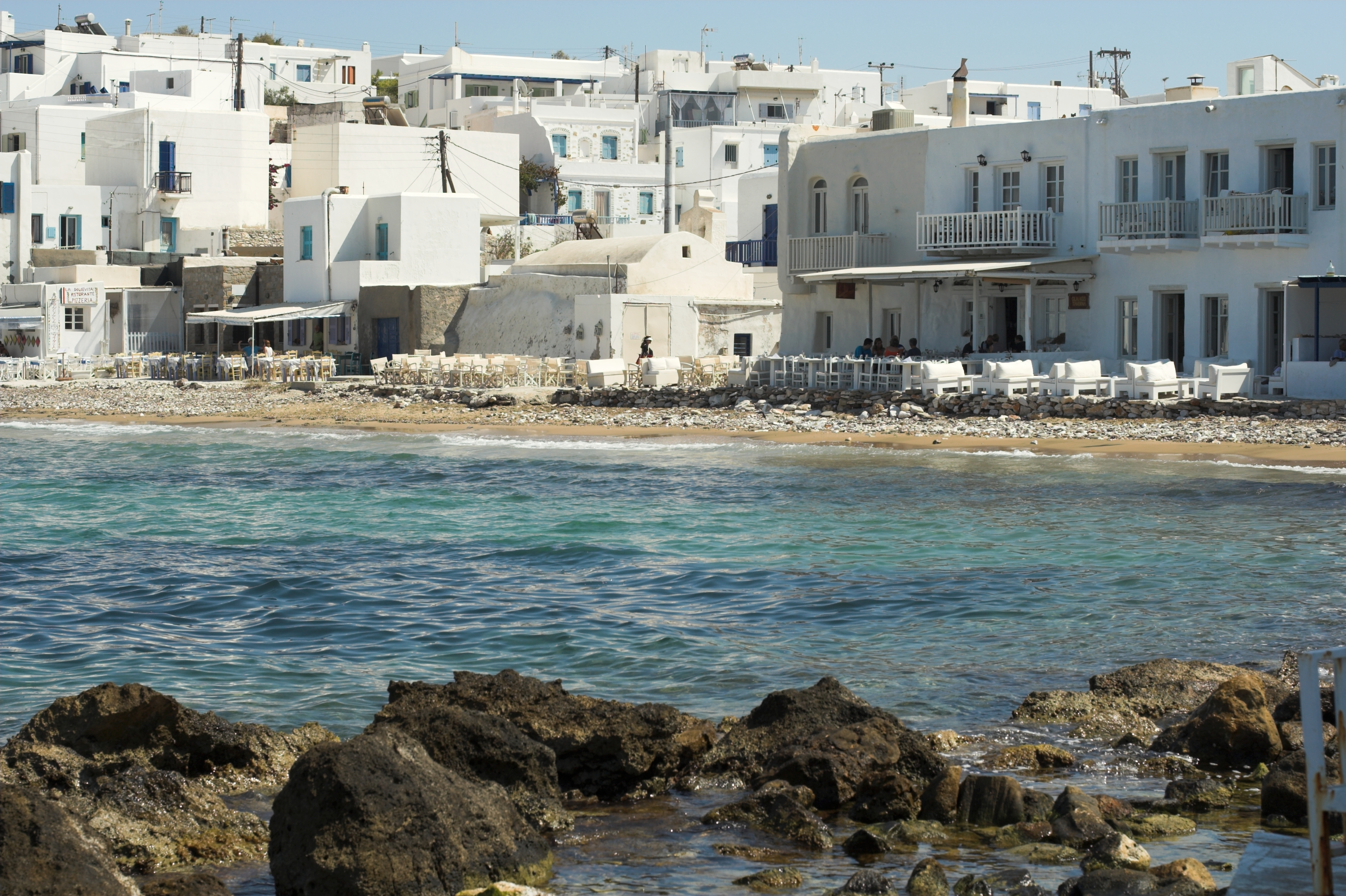
Naoussa, Paros

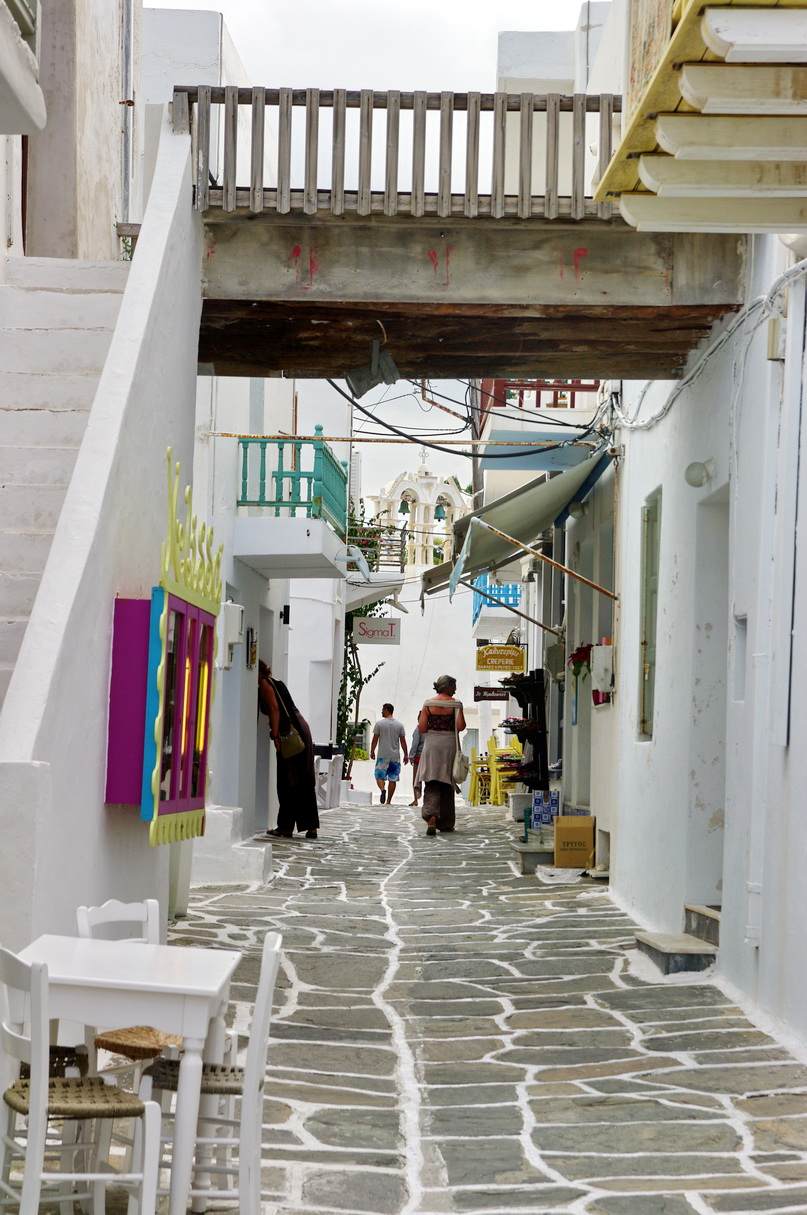
Street in Naoussa, Paros

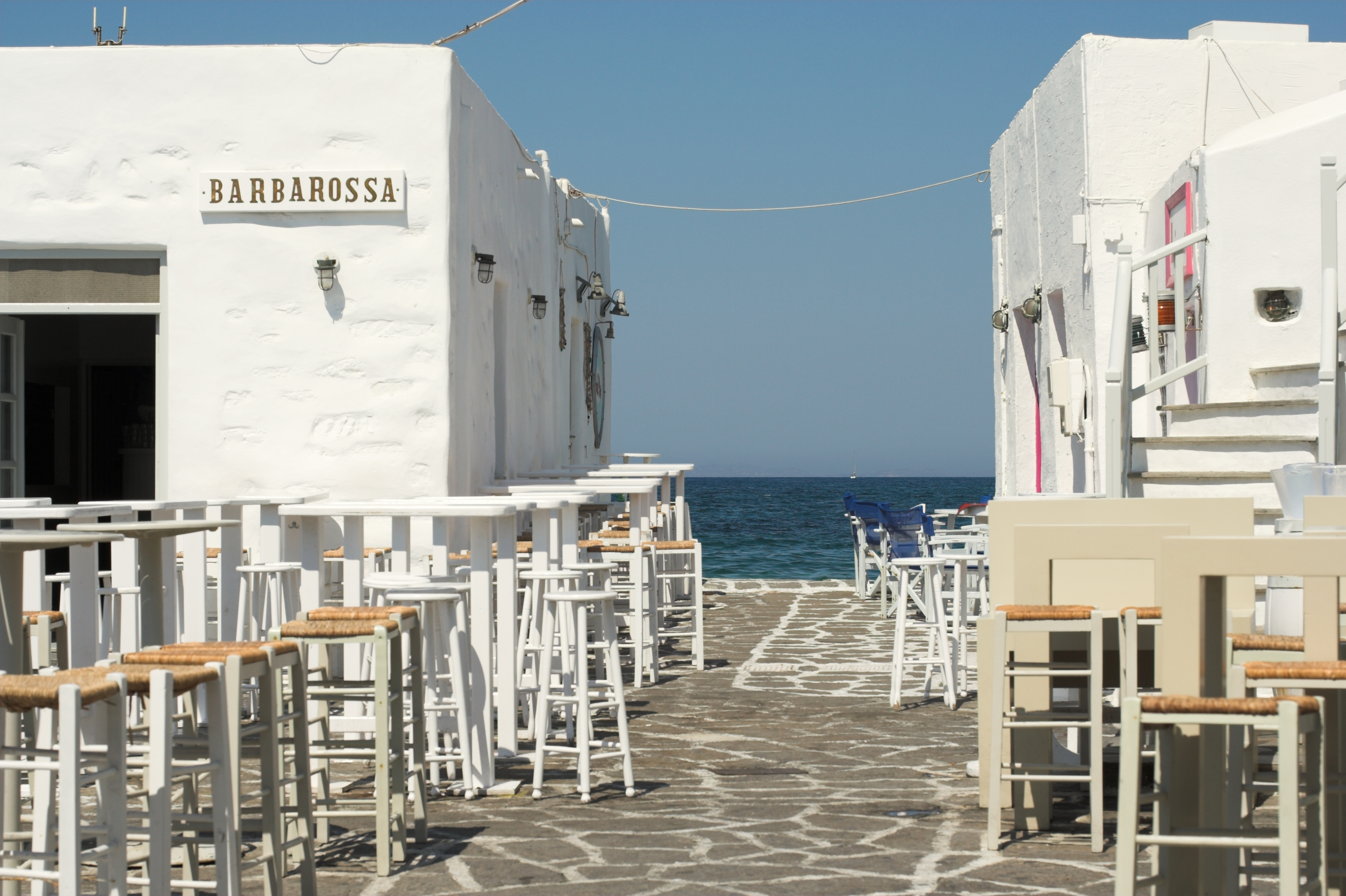
Naoussa, Paros

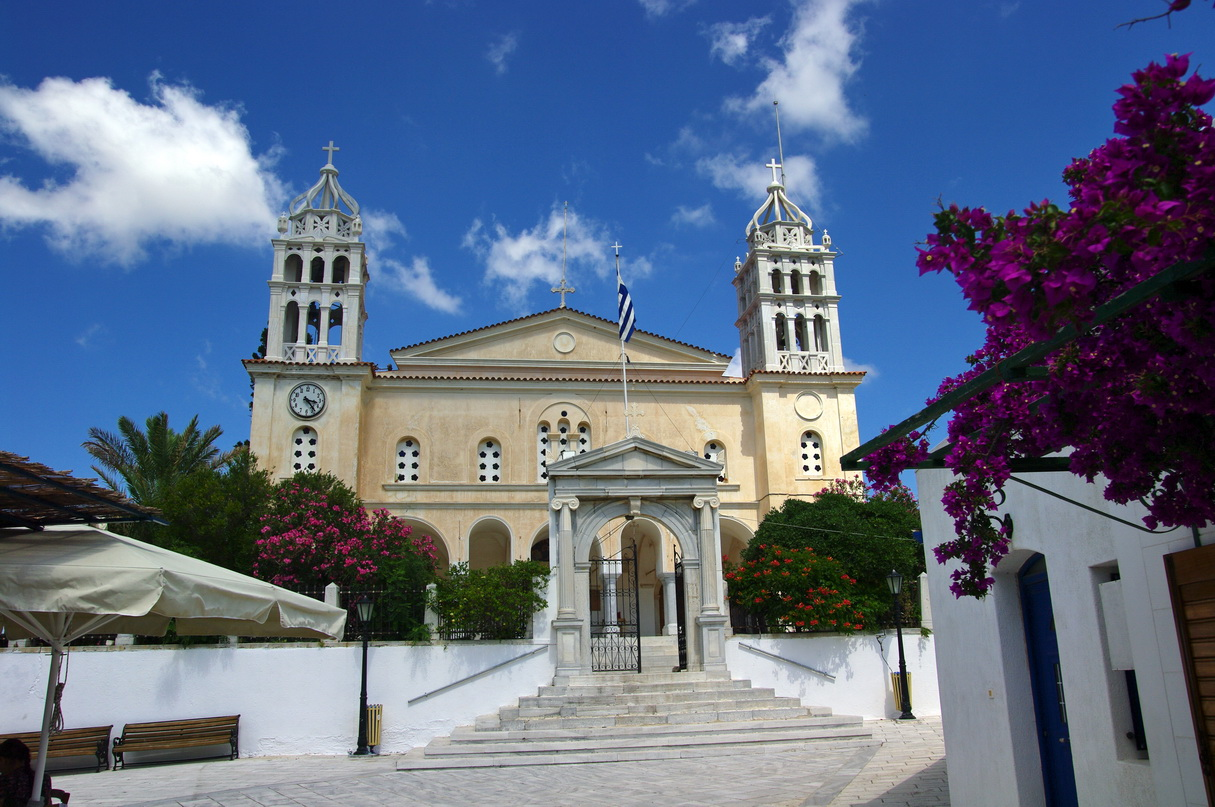
Church in Lefkes

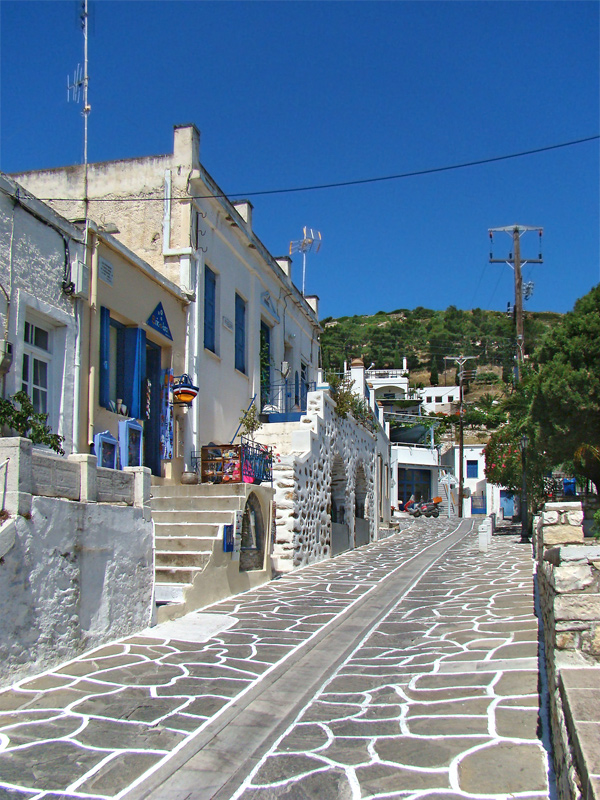
Lefkes, Paros, Greece.

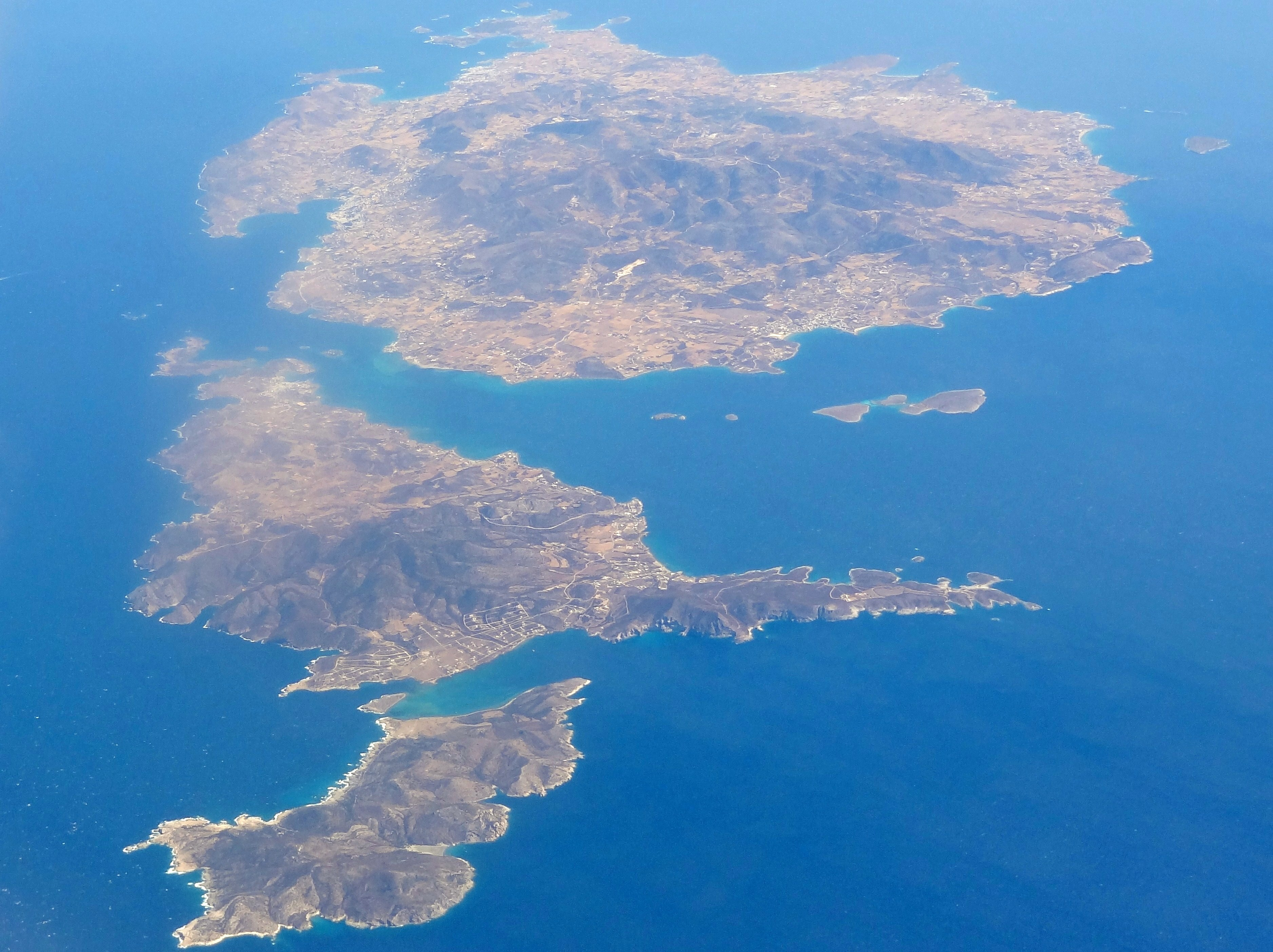
Paros, Antiparos & Despotiko islands

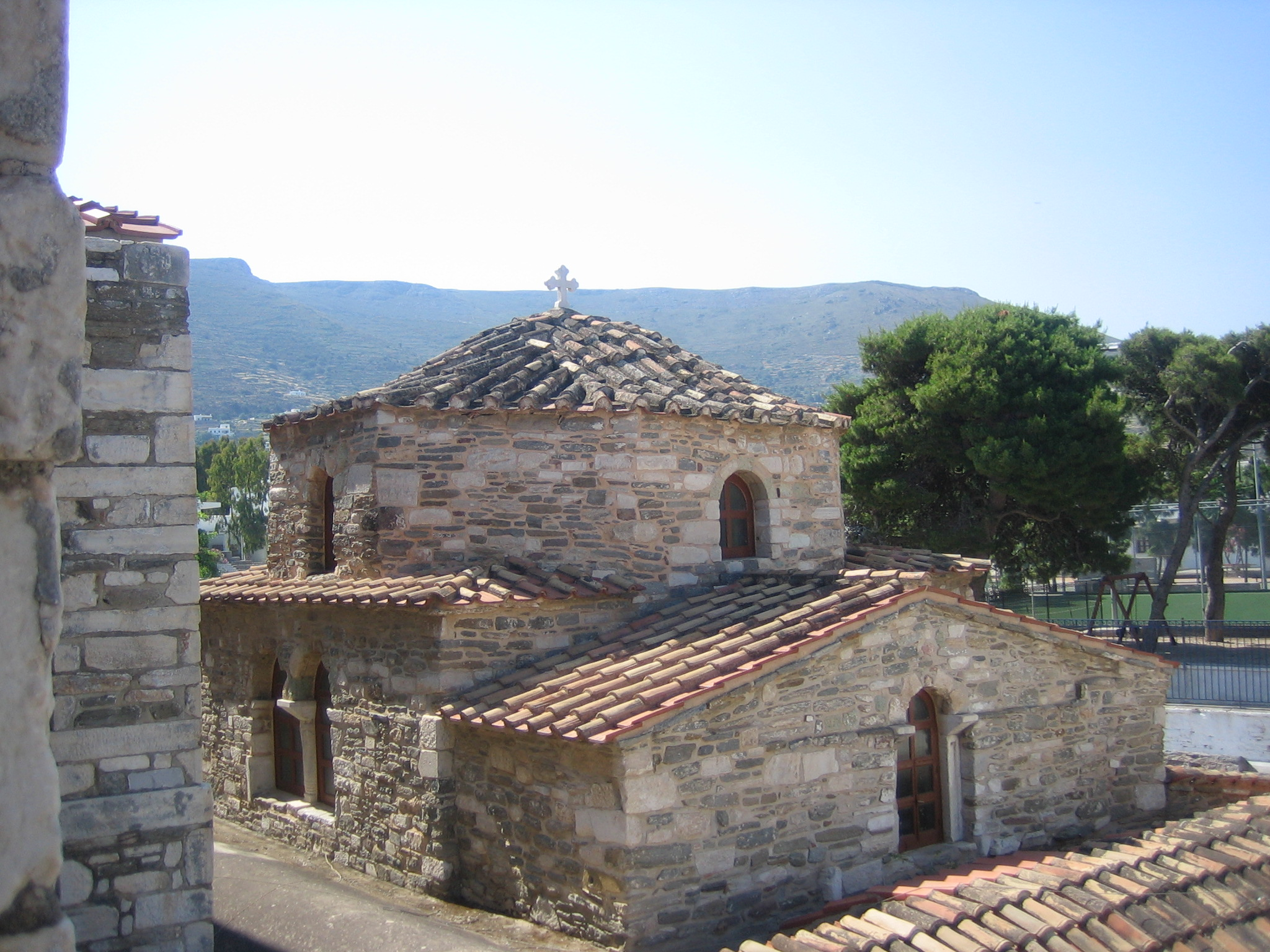
Church of the 100 doors (Ekatontapyliani), Baptistery, Parikia

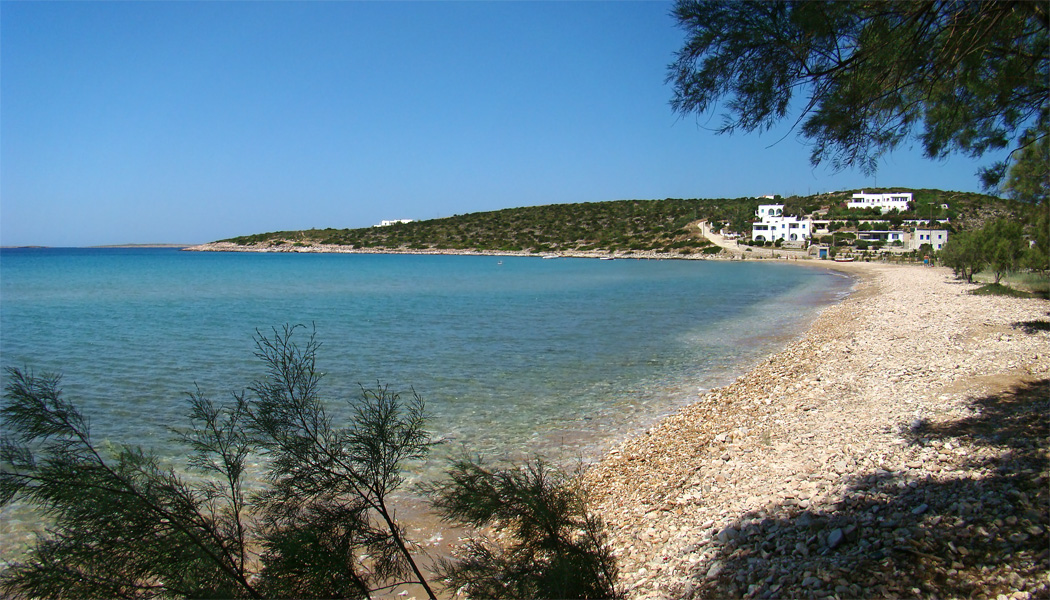
Alyki, Paros

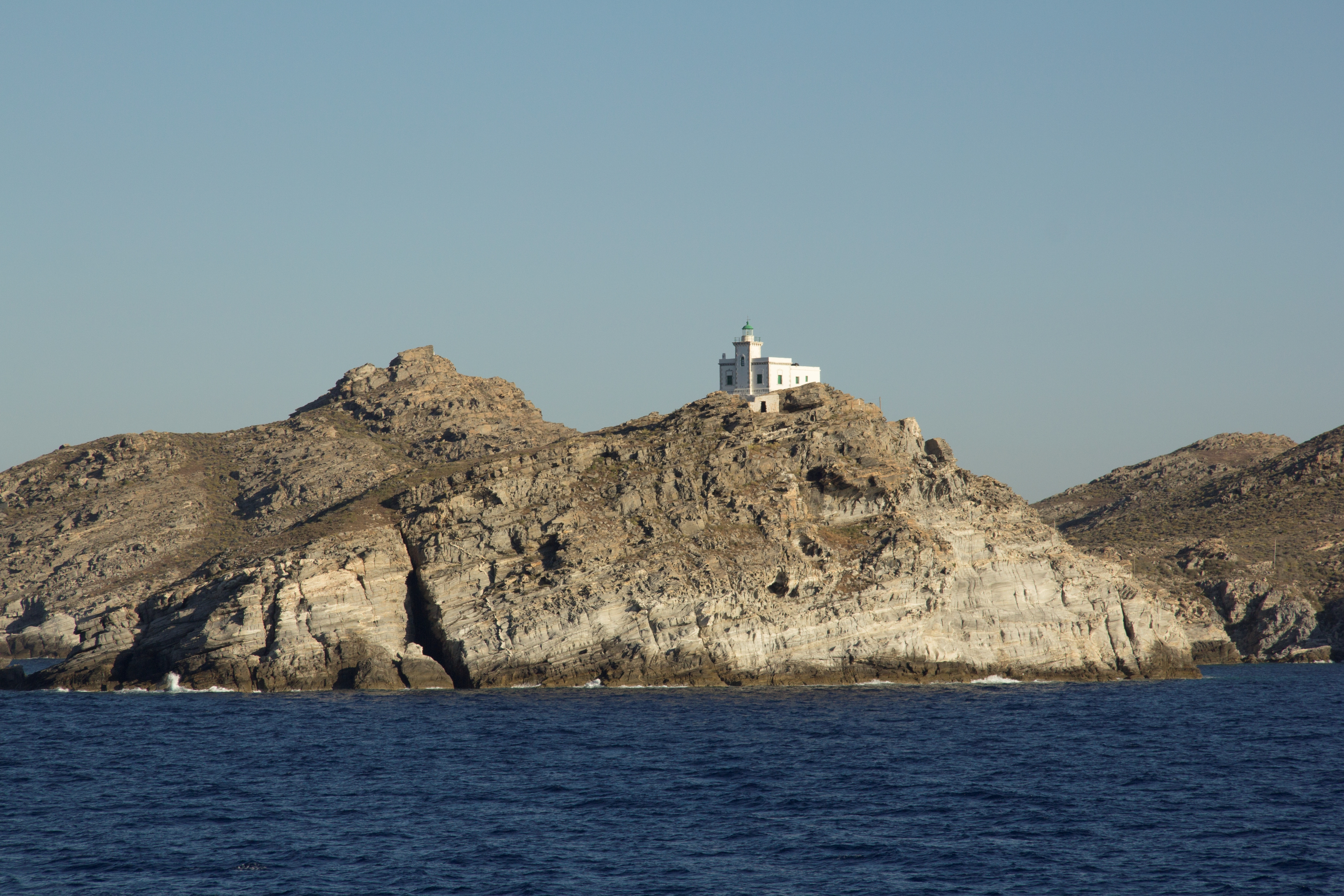
Old lighthouse on the island of Paros

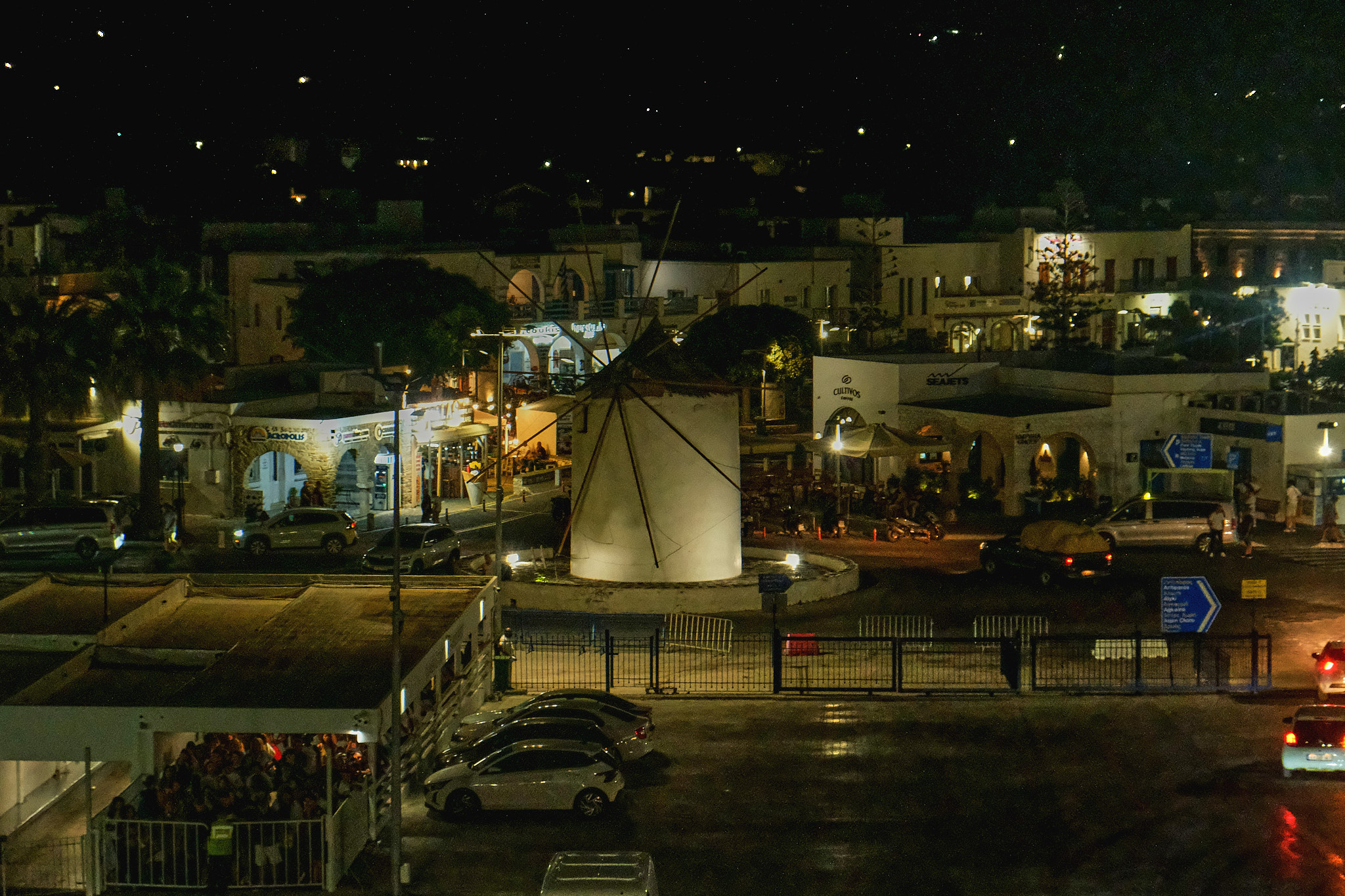
Paros harbor at night

== See also ==
- Communities of the Cyclades
- Aegean Center for the Fine Arts
- Pounta
