= Parikia =

Capital and the main port of Paros island in Greece

Coordinates: 37.0862°N 25.1508°E

Parikia (Greek: Παροικία), also romanized as Paroikia, is the capital and the main port of Paros island in southern Greece. It is one of the most typical Cycladic settlements as it is distinguished by its narrow cobbled paths, the old churches, the small shops and the houses in blue and white. Parikia is today one of the most popular and busiest spots on the island, as its cafeterias and restaurants along the waterfront attract many visitors. Parikia is also famous for its vivid nightlife, which makes it along with Naoussa village (on the northern side of the island) the two busiest tourist resorts of Paros.

Parikia is found on the western side of the island and has 4,500 permanent inhabitants.

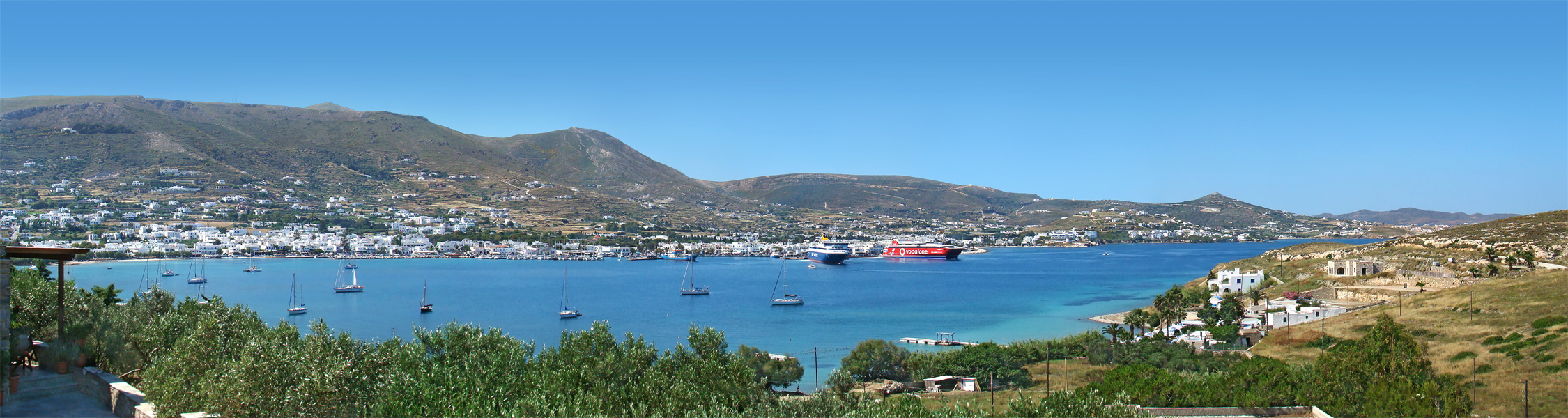
Panoramic view of Parikia and its waterfront.

== History ==
The history of Parikia starts in the ancient times, as the monuments all over the village show. The port gave to Paros all its strength and made it a great naval power. For a long time, the village followed the historical paths of the rest of the island.

Manto Mavrogenous, the heroine of the Greek War of Independence (1821–29), who originated from Mykonos died in Parikia. There is a statue of her in the village.

On 26 September 2000 the ferry Express Samina collided with the Portes islets off the bay of Parikia, killing 82 of those on board.

== Sights ==
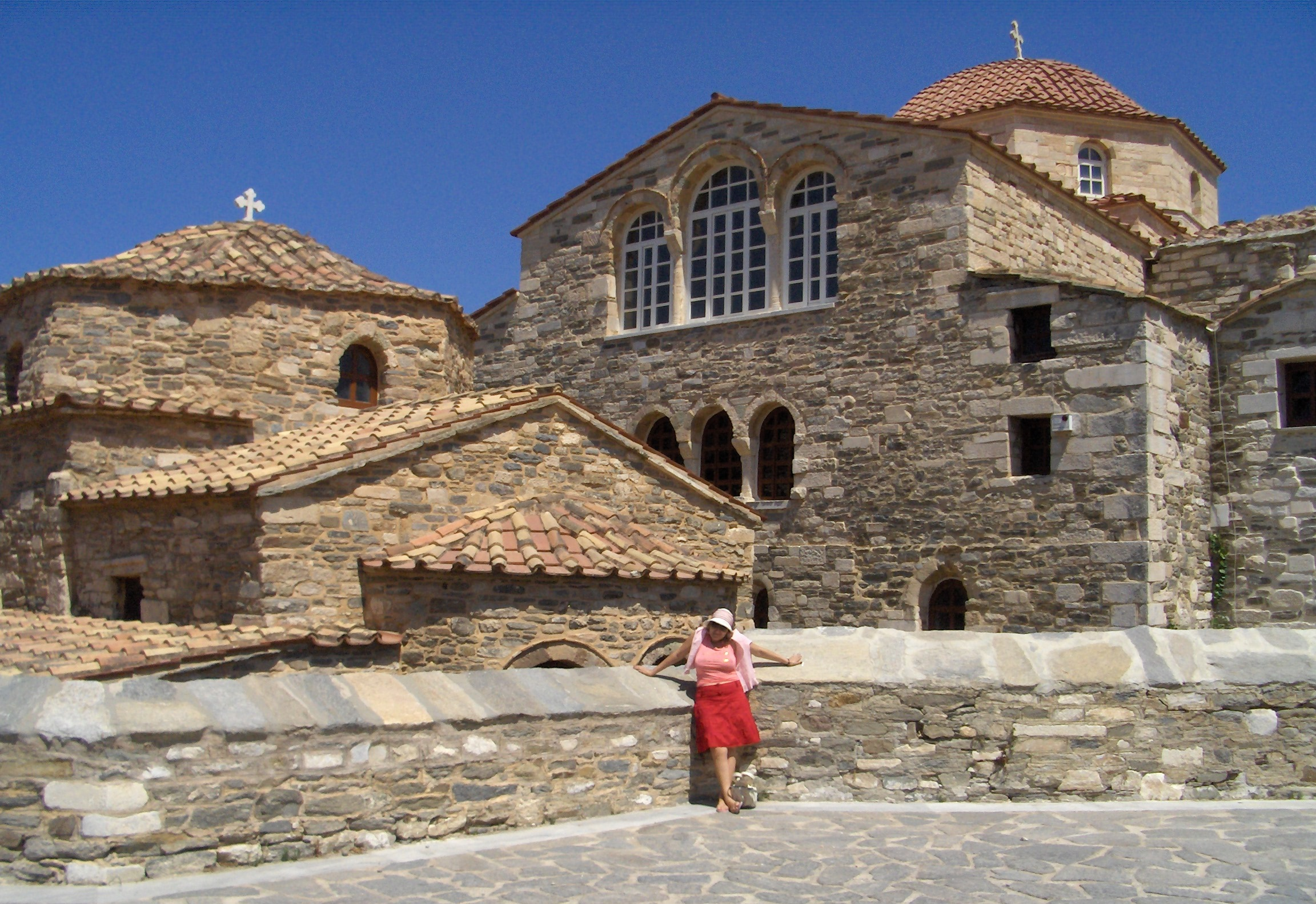
Panagia Ekatontapiliani church, with a woman for scale.

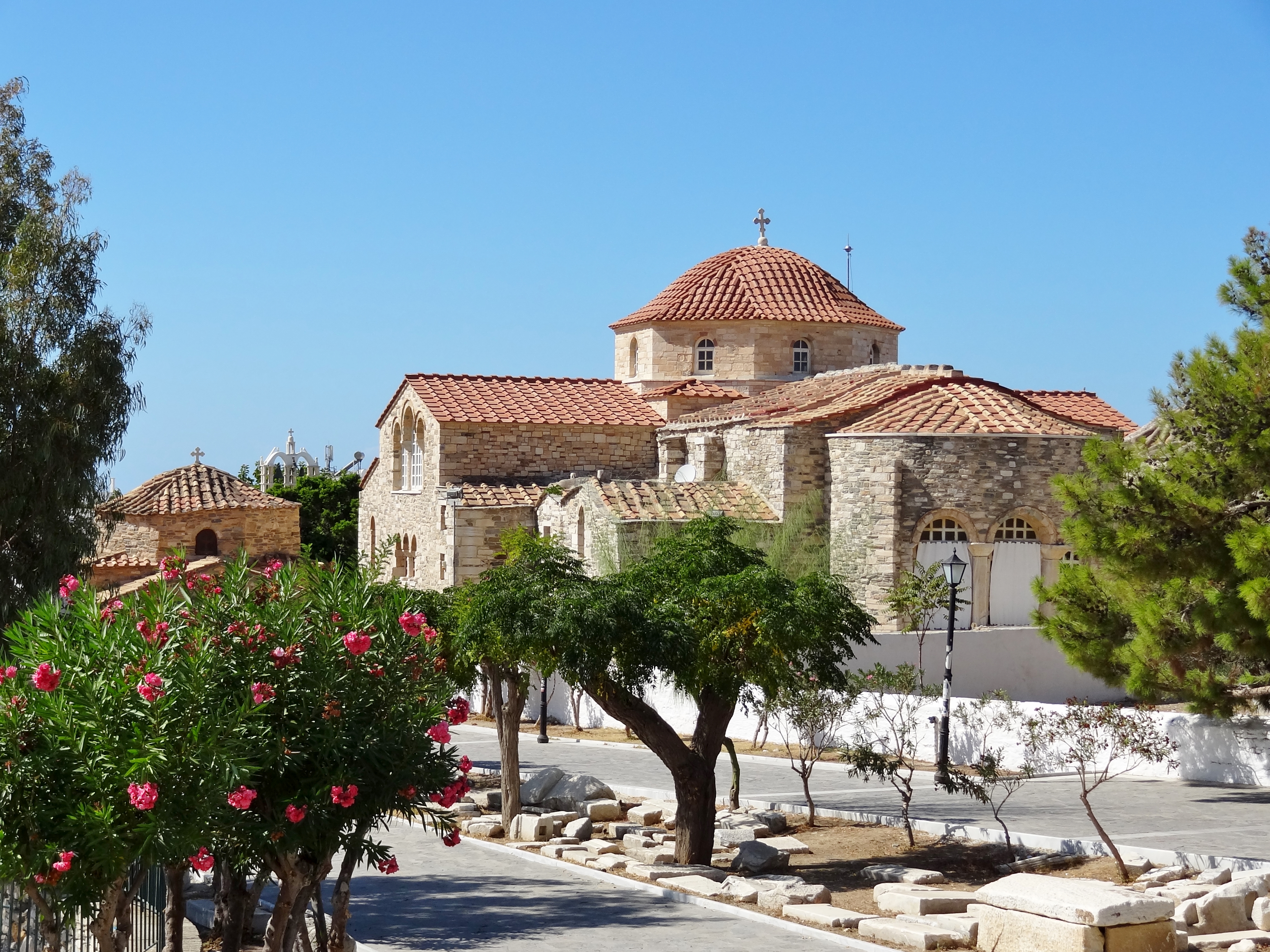
Church of Panagía Ekatontapylianí

The most famous monument in Parikia is the church of Panagia Ekatontapiliani, whose name actually means "the Church of 100 doors". This ecclesiastical complex was originally built in the 4th century on the site of an ancient gymnasium and remodelled in the mid-6th century during the reign of the Byzantine Emperor Justinian the Great. Today it has many interesting frescoes on its walls and it hosts the Ecclesiastical Museum of Parikia. Close to Parikia, you will also find some other interesting monasteries, such as the Monastery of Logovardas, the Monastery of Saint Anargyroi and the Monastery of Jesus of the Forest.

In the centre of Parikia, you can see some Neoclassical mansions hosting public services.

The trademarks of Parikia are the preserved windmill in the port and the Venetian Castle, on top of the village, which was built by the Venetians in the early 17th century. The walls of the Castle have been built with remains of ancient temples.

Parikia is home to the Archaeological Museum of Paros, a small museum housing some of the many finds from sites in Paros.
