= Paros (regional unit) =

Paros Περιφερειακή ενότητα Πάρου
- Regional unit
- Municipalities of the Cyclades

- Paros within Greece

- Location within Greece
- Coordinates: 37°05′N 25°10′E
- Country: Greece
- Administrative region: South Aegean

Area
  - Total: 241.5 km^{2} (93.2 sq mi)

Population (2021)
  - Total: 15,785
  - Density: 65.36/km^{2} (169.3/sq mi)
- Time zone: UTC+2 (EET)
  - Summer (DST): UTC+3 (EEST)

Paros (Greek: Περιφερειακή ενότητα Πάρου) is one of the regional units of Greece. It is part of the region of South Aegean. The regional unit covers the islands of Paros, Antiparos and several smaller islands in the Aegean Sea.

== Administration ==
As a part of the 2011 Kallikratis government reform, the regional unit Paros was created out of part of the former Cyclades Prefecture. It is subdivided into 2 municipalities. These are (number as in the map in the infobox):

- Antiparos (5)
- Paros (14)

== Province ==
The province of Paros (Greek: Επαρχία Πάρου) was one of the provinces of the Cyclades Prefecture. It had the same territory as the present regional unit. It was abolished in 2006.
