= Despotiko =

Uninhabited Greek island

Native name: Δεσποτικό
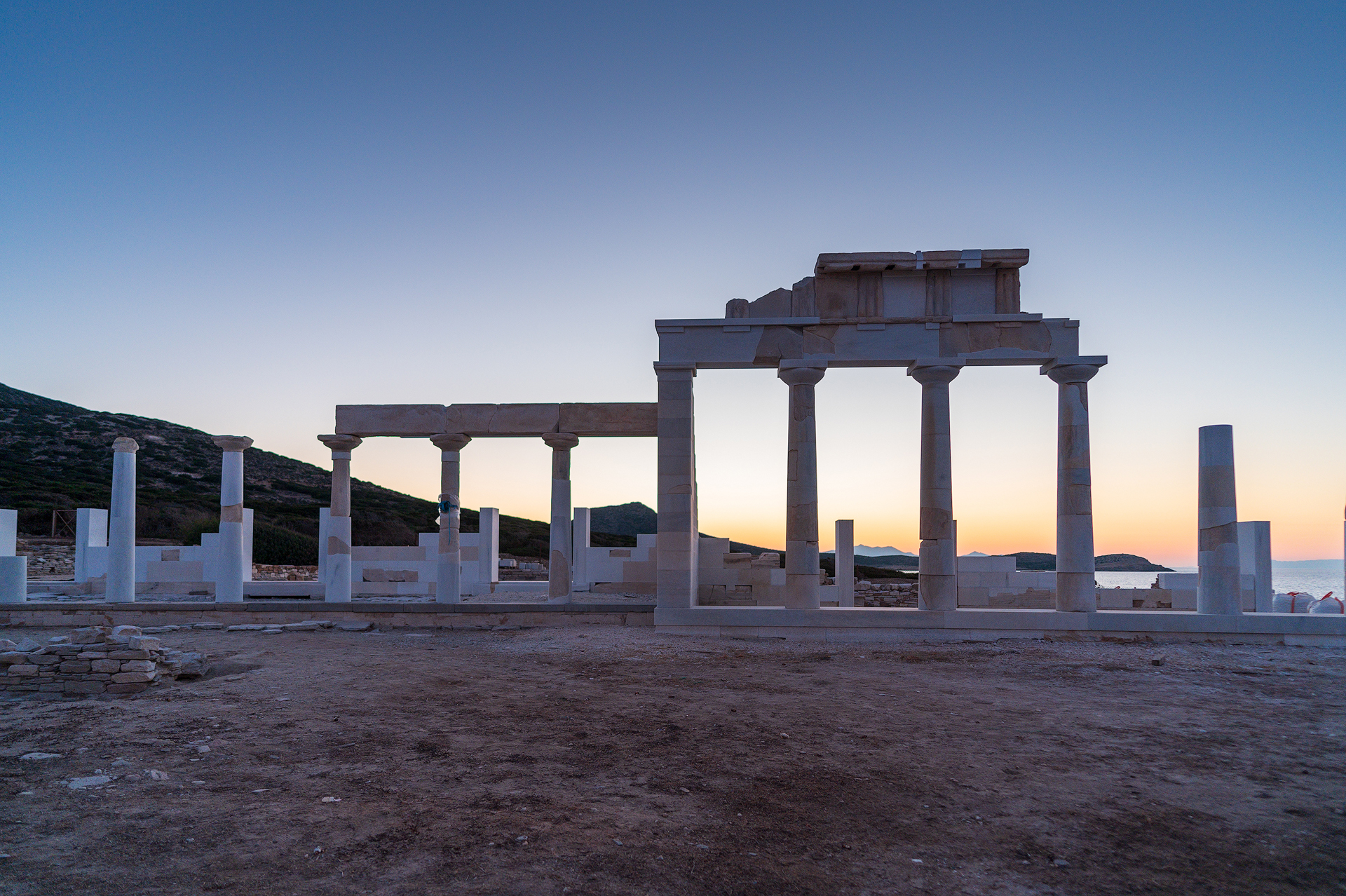
- Sanctuary of Apollo at Despotiko

- Location within Greece

Geography
- Coordinates: 36.96°N 25.00°E
- Archipelago: Cyclades
- Highest elevation: 187 m (614 ft)

Administration
- Greece
- Region: South Aegean
- Regional unit: Paros

Demographics
- Population: 0 (2001)

Additional information
- Postal code: 840 07
- Area code: 22840
- Vehicle registration: EM

Despotikó (Greek: Δεσποτικό), anciently, Prepesinthus or Prepesinthos (Ancient Greek: Πρεπέσινθος), is a small, uninhabited Greek island in the Cyclades. It is situated west of the island of Antiparos, and east of the smaller island of Strongyli (not to be confused with Strongyli Megistis).

== Geography ==
The small and dry island is located about 700 m southwest from the shores of Antiparos. Despotiko is situated almost exactly in the center of the Cyclades and during clear days it is possible to view the surrounding islands of Antiparos, Syros, Serifos, Sifnos, Kimolos, Folegandros, Sikinos and Ios (in anticlockwise order). Administratively, the island is part of the community of Antiparos. Currently, the island can only be reached by boats starting from the island of Antiparos. Boats leave either from the main village of Antiparos or from Agios Georgios (southwest Antiparos), just opposite Despotiko. Usually, the final destination for them lies on the southern part of the island where a large sandy beach is located.

The strait separating Despotiko from Antiparos only has a maximum depth of about 1 m, with the intervening islet of Tsimintiri. This extreme shallowness of the strait suggests the possibility of a link between Antiparos and Despotiko in former times. Indicators of previous sea-levels include archaeological remains on the sea-floor of Despotiko Bay such as Early Bronze Age cist graves off Koimitiri down to 3m water depths; additionally there are walls, a well-head, and an oven of unknown age at a 3m depth off-shore from Agios Georgios on Antiparos. Numerous parallel trenches occur west of the Panagia chapel on Despotiko which have not been excavated or dated so far, but can be compared with the almost identical, partly submerged, probably Hellenistic viticulture trenches from northeast Antiparos. These submerged archaeological structures, together with a Classical marble inscription from the sanctuary on Despotiko reading ΕΣΤΙΑΣ ΙΣΘΜΙΑΣ, (Hestias Isthmias, which essentially means "for Hestia of the Isthmus"), suggest that the relative sea-level in this area was at least 3m lower during the Early Bronze Age and still more than 1m lower during the Hellenistic time. This implies that an isthmus may have linked Despotiko, Koimitiri and Antiparos at least until the Hellenistic time.

== Archaeology and history ==
Although presently uninhabited, there are significant indications that in prehistoric and ancient times the island - due to its central position among the Cyclades and the large Despotiko Bay (between the island and Antiparos) providing safe anchorage - played an important role in maritime communication routes. Currently, excavations are taking place in the northwest part of the island and so far the findings are of great importance. The excavations proved the existence of an important late Archaic sanctuary with abundant objects indicating links to mainland Greece, the Eastern Mediterranean and even to Northern Africa, as well as the continued use of this area in the Classical, Hellenistic, Roman and Frankish periods. The islet was visited in early 1884 by the English explorer Theodore Bent who made a brief survey and located two 'graveyards'. Mabel Bent records in her diary at the time that her husband discovered a temple there. 2015 excavations at the Archaic (6th C BC) sanctuary site on an Aegean Sea islet revealed new evidence about its size and organization. The sanctuary seems to have been devoted to Apollo. Archaeologists discovered an ornate façade of a structure measuring 35 meters by 15 meters, suggesting that the sanctuary was extended and rebuilt several times during the Classical and Hellenistic periods. A large, four-room building on the site's west section featured a large stone altar in one of the rooms as well as pottery fragments bearing inscriptions with Apollo's name. A long wall, stretching from what would have been the islet's ancient port to the site of the sanctuary, was also revealed. Some of the artefacts from the excavations are exhibited in the archaeological museum in Parikia, the capital of the nearby island of Paros, along with other important antiquities from the region. Some glimpses of the early modern and modern history of Despotiko might be reconstructed from historic topographic maps and descriptions of travellers from that period. The island, under the name Prepesinthus, is also noted by ancient geographers Strabo and Pliny the Elder.

== Environment, nature and biodiversity ==
Due to low and non-permanent human presence, as well as moderate pasture pressure, some natural habitat types, typical of the central Cyclades, are very well preserved. Therefore, Despotiko, Strongyli and the southernmost part of Antiparos as well as surrounding marine areas have been selected for a NATURA 2000 habitat, which is part of an ecological network of protected areas in the European Union. Large areas are covered by phrygana and a garrigue. The seal Monachus monachus is a permanent resident of the shallow marine area. On the sea floor Posidonia seagrass meadows provide habitat for a diverse fauna and flora.

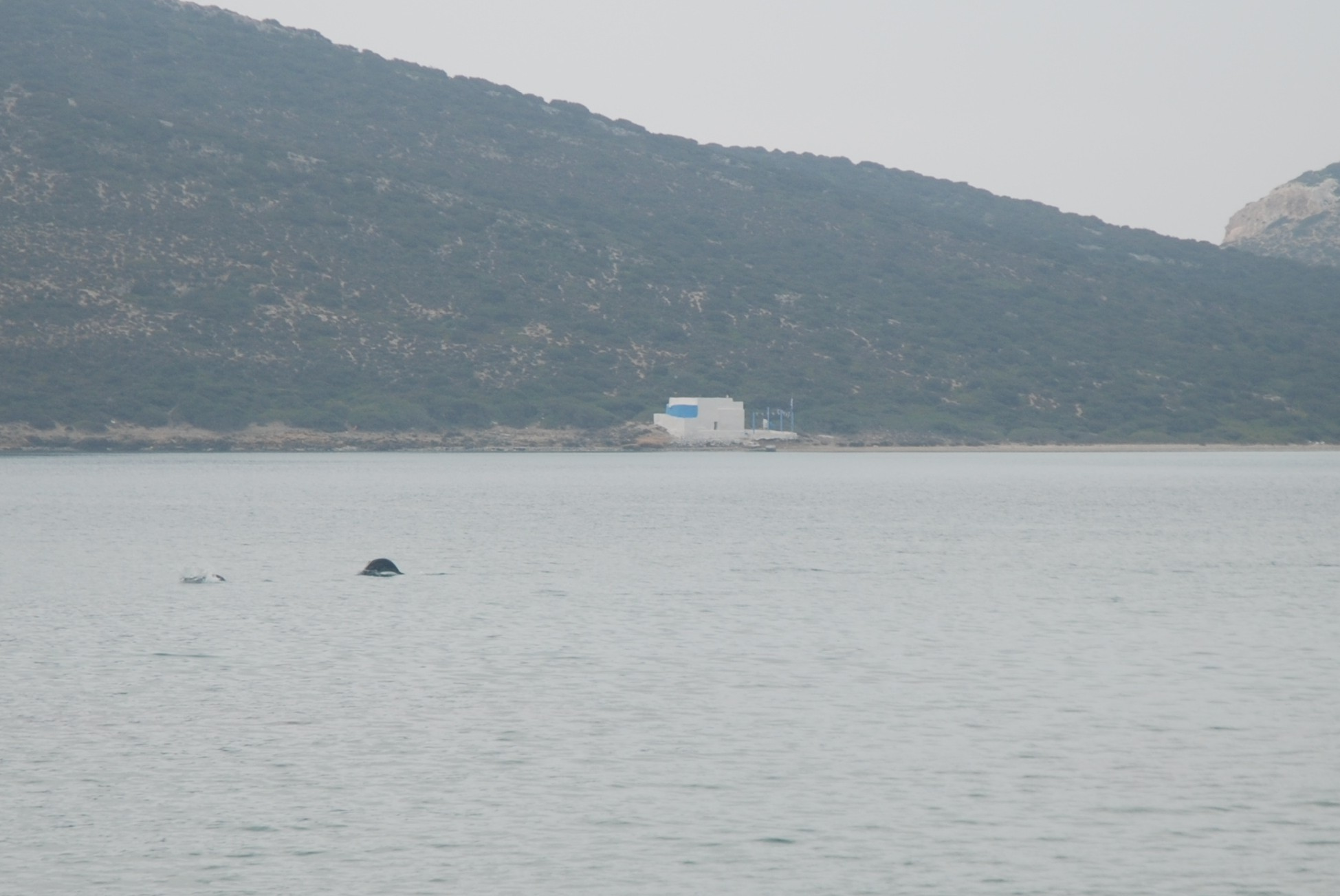
View from Agios Georgios on Antiparos towards Panagia on Despotiko with two seals jumping in the water of Despotiko Bay (15-09-2008)

== Geology ==
First comments about the geology of Despotiko originate from Fiedler in 1841, but it took until 1963 for the first geological map to be published. Tectonically, Despotiko, Antiparos, and Paros belong to the Attic-Cycladic Crystalline of the Central Hellenides, a stack of metamorphic tectonic nappes, mainly comprising variable types of gneiss, schist, marble and amphibolite, and tectonic slices of unmetamorphosed sediments on top, separated by low-angle normal faults from the metamorphic units below.

Despotiko is dominated by metamorphic rocks with foliation surfaces dipping quite uniformly towards the southwest at shallow angles. The structurally lowest parts in the north and northeast of the island consist of grey, strongly foliated, mylonitic ortho-gneiss with abundant cross-cutting pegmatite dikes that become more and more deformed and rotated parallel to the foliation towards the hanging wall. The ortho-gneiss is followed by up to several metres thick, prominent white, strongly foliated, mylonitic gneiss. Higher up are medium-grained, white calcite marble, followed by greenish-white gneiss and an alternation of chlorite epidote schist and thin marble layers, on top of which are found chlorite epidote gneiss and retrogressed amphibolite as well as some small serpentinite lenses. The structurally highest parts in the south and southwest of the island comprise thick white to yellowish, fine grained dolomite marble with thin layers of dark grey, carbonaceous calcite marble.

This metamorphic succession is penetrated by six early Pliocene, rhyolitic volcanic pipes, with rare occurrences of small obsidian. These volcanic pipes are genetically associated with the rhyolitic, pyroclastic rocks that cover the whole southern part of Antiparos. Patches of yellowish, porous sandstone, dominated by well rounded, well sorted fragments of marine organisms and minor siliciclastic components is found in many places on top of the metamorphic rocks.
