= Kardiotissa =

Island in Greece

Native name: Καρδιώτισσα
- Location within Greece

Geography
- Coordinates: 36.63°N 25.02°E
- Archipelago: Cyclades

Administration
- Greece
- Region: South Aegean
- Regional unit: Thira

Demographics
- Population: 0 (2001)

Additional information
- Postal code: 840 10
- Area code: 22860
- Vehicle registration: EM

Kardiotissa (Greek: Καρδιώτισσα), anciently, Lagusa or Lagousa (Ancient Greek: Λάγουσα) or Lagussa or Lagoussa (Λαγοῦσσα), is a Greek island in the Cyclades. It is uninhabited and administratively a part of the island community of Sikinos. It lies midway between that island and the island of Folegandros.
