= Tsimintiri =

Coordinates: 36°58′33″N 25°01′07″E

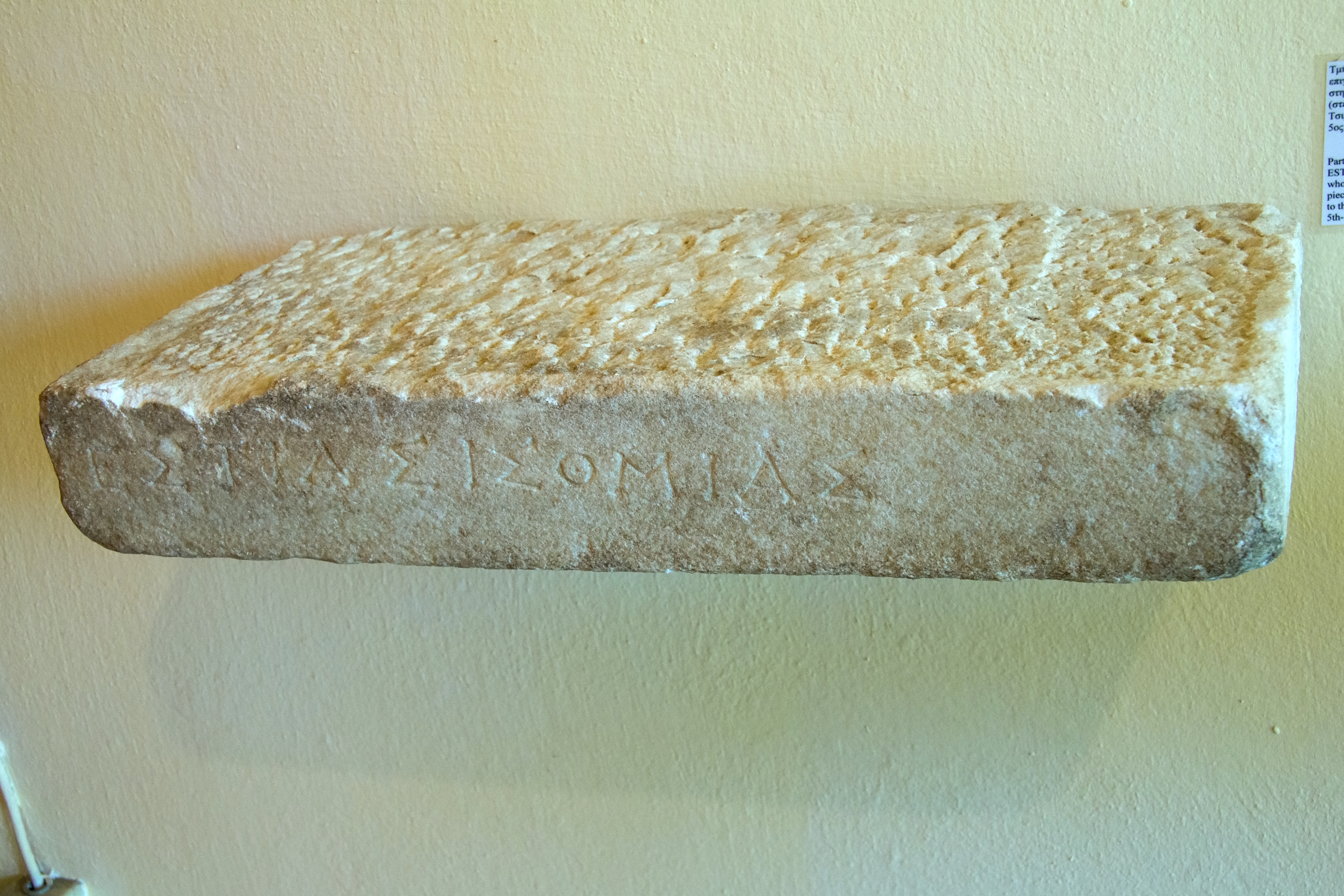
Marble altar with Greek inscription dedicated to "ΕΣΤΙΑΣ ΙΣΘΜΙΑΣ" or "Hestia Isthmia", implying existence of an isthmus between Despotiko and Tsimintiri.

Tsimintiri, also known as Koimitiri, is a small, uninhabited islet in the Cyclades islands of the southern Aegean. Tsimintiri is located between the islands of Antiparos and Despotiko. The strait that separates all three islands is no more than 1 metre (3 ft) deep, so it is believed that the islands were connected as a single landmass in Classical times.

Archaeologists have discovered grave sites on the island, which may be the reason for its alternate name, Koimitiri, meaning "resting place."
