= Lagusa =

Lagusa or Lagousa (Ancient Greek: Λάγουσα) or Lagussa or Lagoussa (Λαγοῦσσα) may refer to:

- Kardiotissa, an island in the Aegean Sea belonging to Greece
- Kızılada, Fethiye, an island in the Mediterranean Sea belonging to Turkey
