= Pounta, Paros, Greece =

Coastal village on the island of Paros

Coordinates: 37.038°N 25.102°E

Pounta is a small coastal village on the west coast of Paros, Greece to the southwest of the main town of Paros. It is located opposite the main town of Antiparos and is the main point of crossing between the islands of Paros and Antiparos. Offshore is the island of Revmatonisi. It has a small harbour and jetty; a ferry passes between the islands every half-hour. The strait between the islands is noted for windsurfing and kiteboarding, and Pounta has the Eurodivers Club.
