= Adriana Crispo =

Adriana Crispo (d. after 1537) was a noblewoman of the Crispo family, lady of Ios, Therasia (1508–1537) and Antiparos (1528–1537) in the Cyclades. She was one of the last rulers before the conquest of the Ottoman Empire.

== Life ==
She was the daughter of Marco II and III of Ios and Santhorini and Lucretia Loredani.

She married Alvise/Alessandro Pisani, a Venetian noble, in 1508.

In 1508, she succeeded her father, Marco, great-grandson of Francesco I Crispo, as lady of Ios and Therasia.

In 1528 she succeeded her grandmother, Lucrezia Loredano (1446–1528) in Antiparos.

She co-ruled with her husband, Alessandro Pisani of Anaphi and Antiparos, jure uxoris.

The islands were conquered by the Osman Turks in 1537.
