= Thira (regional unit) =

Thira Περιφερειακή ενότητα Θήρας
- Regional unit
- Thira within Greece

- Location within Greece
- Coordinates: 36°25′N 25°27′E
- Country: Greece
- Administrative region: South Aegean
- Seat: Fira

Area
  - Total: 314.8 km^{2} (121.5 sq mi)

Population (2021)
  - Total: 19,044
  - Density: 60.50/km^{2} (156.7/sq mi)
- Time zone: UTC+2 (EET)
  - Summer (DST): UTC+3 (EEST)

Thira (Greek: Περιφερειακή ενότητα Θήρας) is one of the regional units of Greece. It is part of the region of South Aegean. The regional unit covers the islands of Thira (Santorini), Anafi, Folegandros, Ios, Sikinos and several smaller islands in the Aegean Sea.

== Administration ==
Municipalities of the Cyclades

As a part of the 2011 Kallikratis government reform, the regional unit of Thira was created out of the former Cyclades Prefecture. It is subdivided into 5 municipalities. These are (number as in the map):

- Anafi (3)
- Folegandros (19)
- Ios (7)
- Santorini (Thira, 6)
- Sikinos (16)

== Province ==
The province of Thira (Greek: Επαρχία Θήρας) was one of the provinces of the Cyclades Prefecture. It had the same territory as the present regional unit. It was abolished in 2006.
