= Antiparos =

Greek island in the Aegean Sea

Antiparos Αντίπαρος
- Municipality
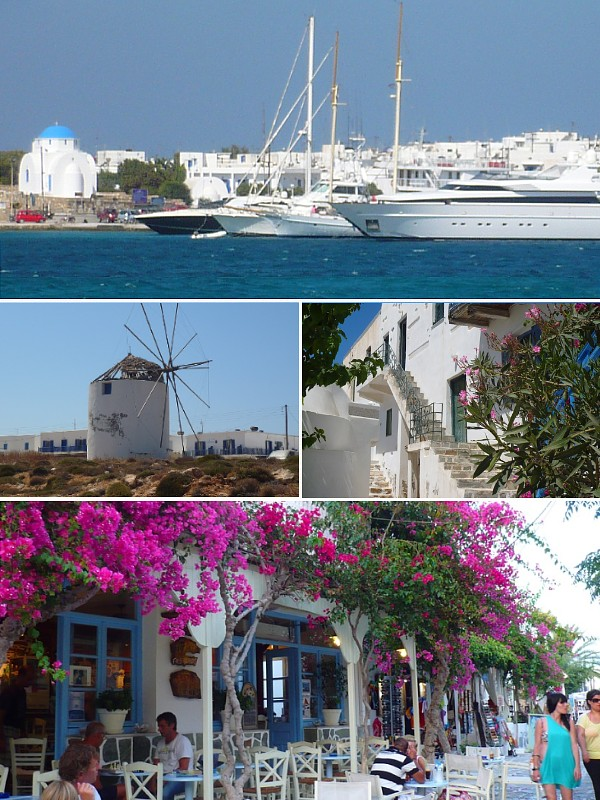
- From top left: The port of Antiparos, windmills, traditional houses in the castle and shopping street

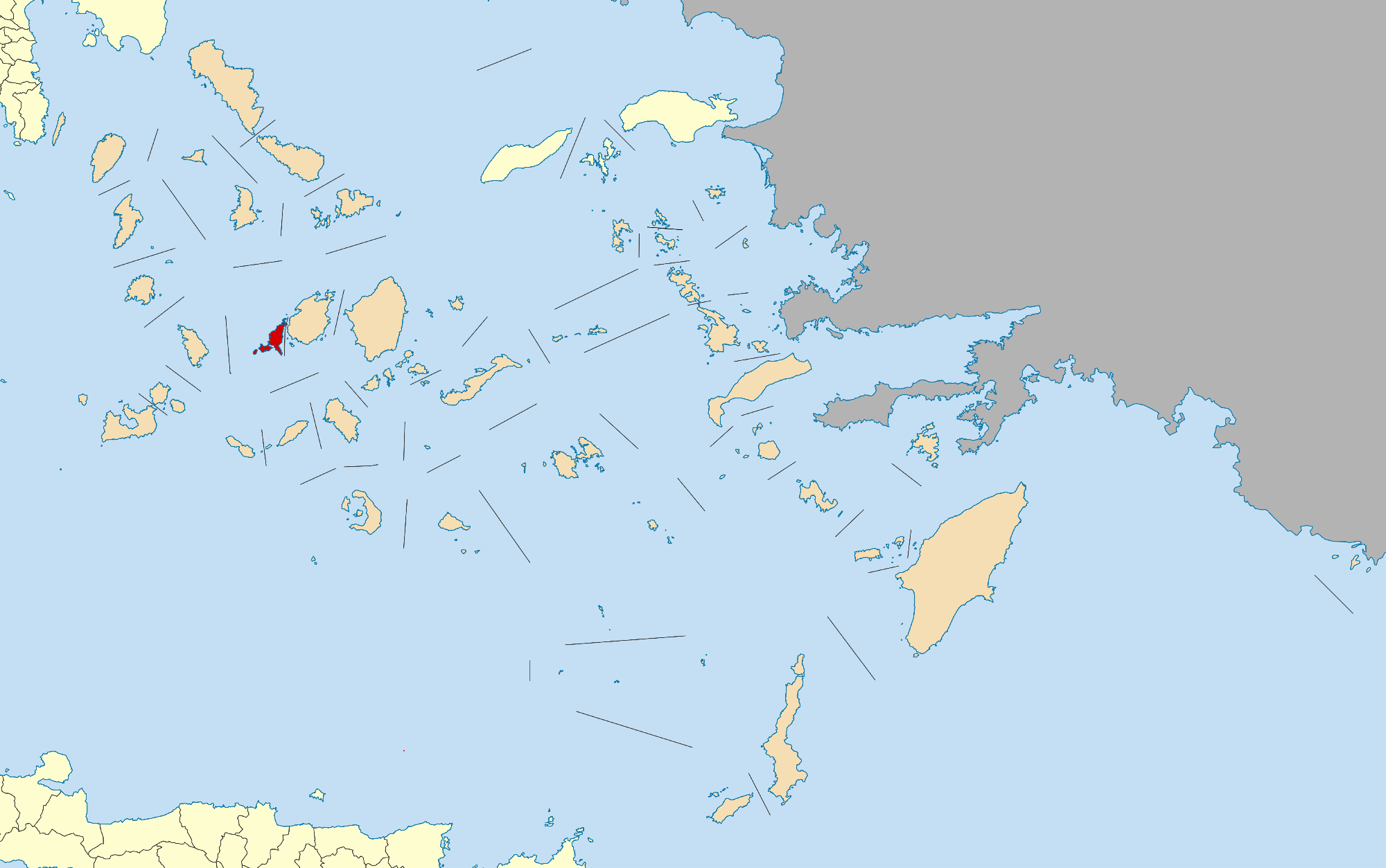

- Location within Greece
- Coordinates: 37°0′34″N 25°3′39″E
- Country: Greece
- Administrative region: South Aegean
- Regional unit: Paros

Area
  - Municipality: 45.182 km^{2} (17.445 sq mi)

Population (2021)
  - Municipality: 1,265
  - Density: 28.00/km^{2} (72.51/sq mi)
- Time zone: UTC+2 (EET)
  - Summer (DST): UTC+3 (EEST)
- Postal code: 840 07
- Area code: 22840
- Vehicle registration: EM
- Website: www.antiparos.gr

Antiparos (Greek: Αντίπαρος; Ancient Greek: Ὠλίαρος, romanized: Oliaros; Latin: Oliarus; is a small island in the southern Aegean, at the heart of the Cyclades, which is less than one nautical mile (1.9 km) from Paros, the port to which it is connected with a local ferry. Saliagos island is the most ancient settlement in the Cyclades, and Despotiko, an uninhabited island in the southwest of Antiparos, is a place of great archaeological importance.

The Community of Antiparos was founded in 1914 and was promoted to a municipality in 2010 with the implementation of the Kallikratis Programme, under the principle of "each island a municipality". It occupies an area of 45.182 square km, including the island of Antiparos and Despotiko. It has, according to the 2021 census, 1,265 permanent residents and a density of 28 inhabitants per km^{2}. The island's economy is based on tourism, fishing, farming and less on agriculture in the plains. It is known for its white houses, cobbled streets and the flowers that thrive in the yards of the houses.

Antiparos is a tourist resort in the summer for Greeks and European visitors, as well as land investors from the United States. Tom Hanks and Rita Wilson own a property on Antiparos. Also, Ioannis Martinos, a Greek shipping businessman, owns a villa on Antiparos, and also Petros Pappas, a Greek shipowner, owns several significant properties on the island.

The main settlement lies at the northeastern tip of the island, opposite Pounda on the main island of Paros, whence a ferry sails for Antiparos harbour. The historical center is located in the Venetian castle of Antiparos, which is connected through the shopping streets to the picturesque coastal street. Other settlements are the resort of St. George in the southwest edge, Soros and Kampos. Beaches in the wider area of the center are Psaralyki, the Sifneiko, Ag Spiridon and the camping beach. Other beaches include: Soros, Glyfa, Apantima, Monastiria.

== Etymology ==
The ancient name of the island was "Oliaros", a word probably of Phoenician origin meaning "wooded mountain". Later the island was named "Antiparos", because of its geographical position, being situated opposite (αντί) the nearby island of Paros.

== Geography and topography ==
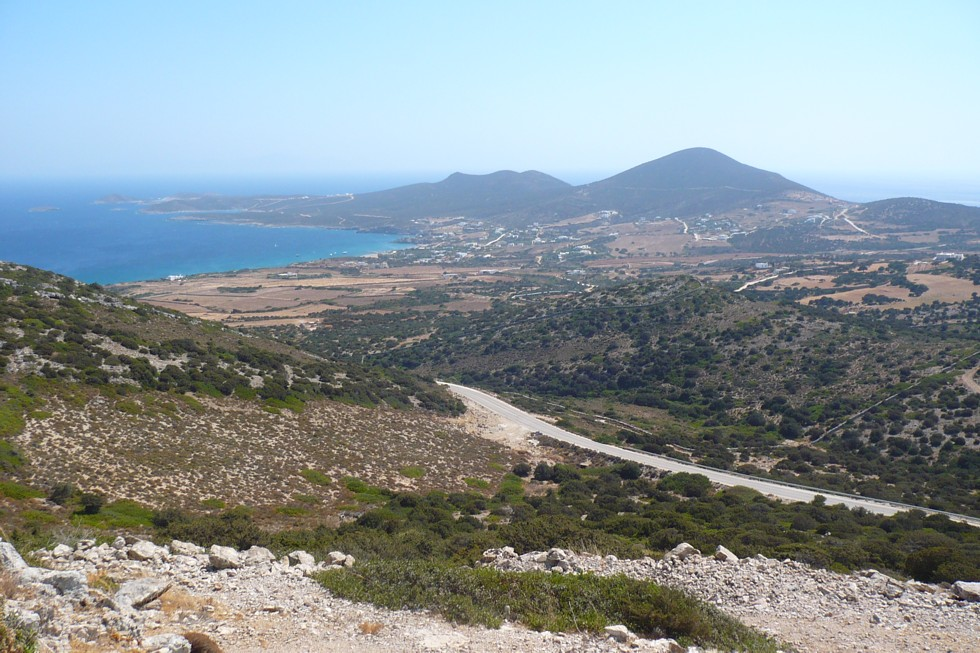
An eastern coast of Antiparos

The island of Antiparos is located 0.8 nautical mi (1.5 km) southwest of Paros, separated by the Strait of Antiparos, known as Amfigeio. It lies 8 kilometres (5.0 miles) from the port of Parikia from which the passenger ferry runs. The maximum length of the island is 11 kilometres (6.8 miles) from north to south, while the maximum width reaches 4.5 kilometres (2.8 miles). The total area is estimated at 37 to 38 km (23 to 24 mi). And the highest peak, St. Elias, in the middle of the island, is at 308 m. The main town is called simply Antiparos. Antiparos is a volcanic rock and dry climate with high moisture, and morphology favors the development of strong winds. The flowers thrive in the region are mainly bougainvillea that adorn the gardens, houses and shops. The morphology of Antiparos is characterised essentially flat, with many small hilly peaks, while the vegetation of the island is low. The island of Antiparos is surrounded by many small uninhabited islands with great historical and archaeological interest, such as Tsimintiri the Round, the Double, snow, Revmatonisi, the Red and Black Tourlos. Particularly well known in the international community is Despotiko, an uninhabited island west of Antiparos, where in recent years excavations of great archaeological importance have been carried out.

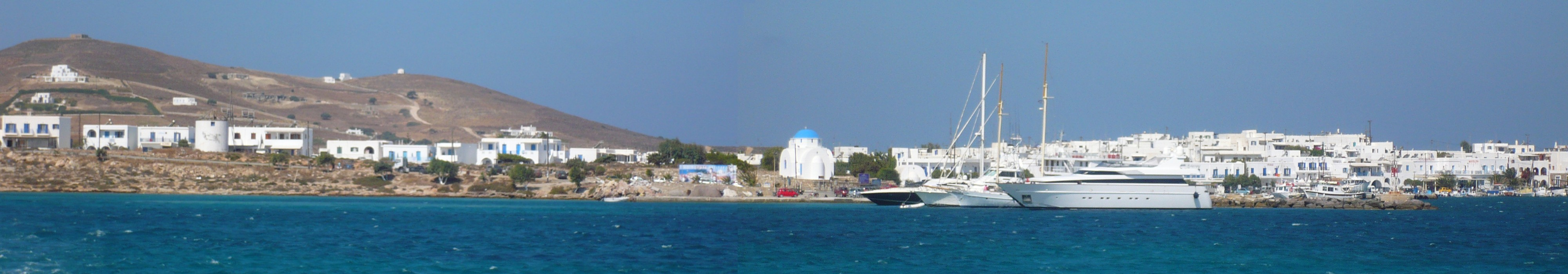

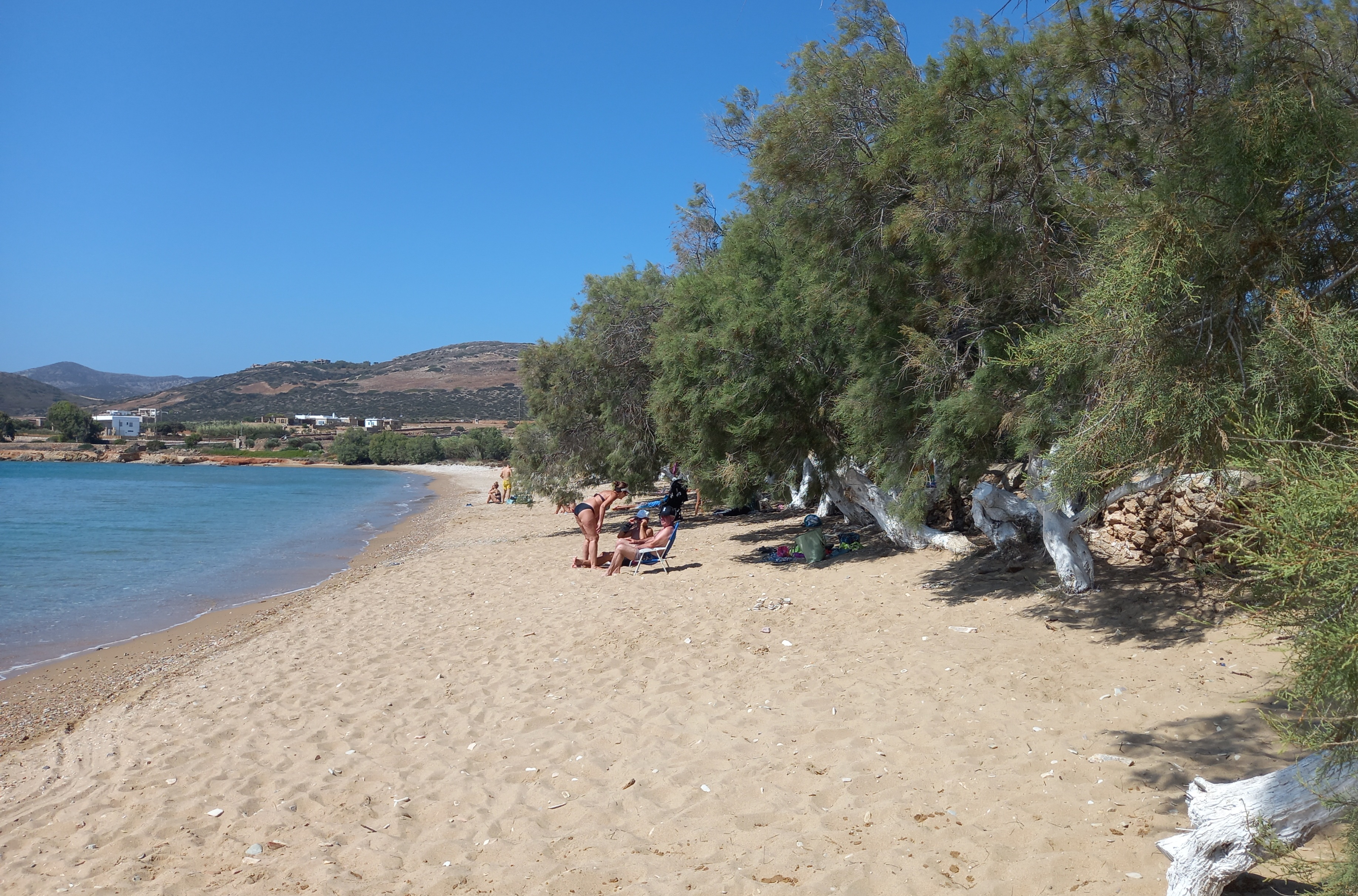
View of the beach Panagia in Antiparos

== Economy ==
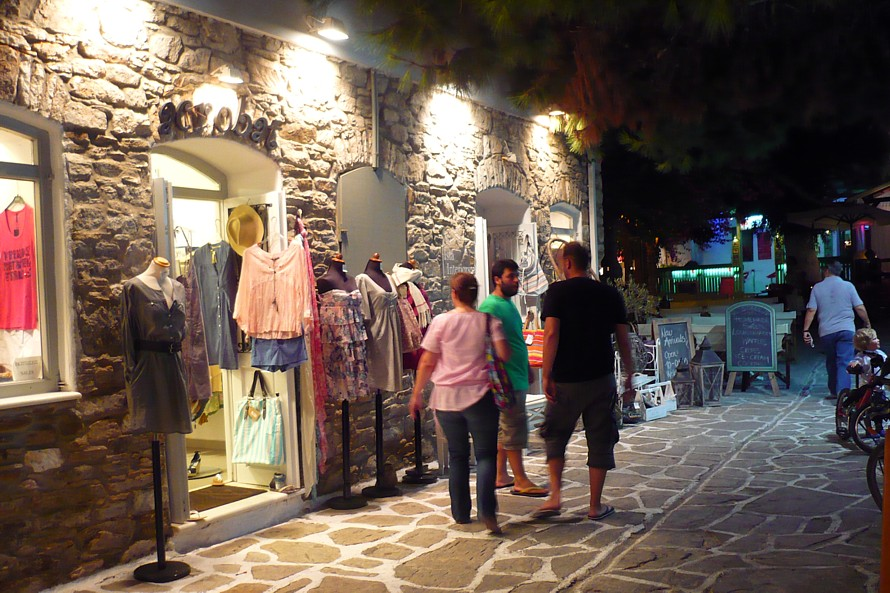
Antiparos stores

The island economy is based largely on tourism: the income from visits to the Cave of Antiparos form a very big part of the budget of the municipality. Most people work in the shops, restaurants and accommodation on the island during the tourist season from Easter to October, with the remainder funded by the Employment Service, or undertaking technical and manual jobs. The island's economy is also helped by agriculture and animal husbandry, and fisheries. Since the 1970s and 1980s, Antiparos has become a popular holiday destination, particularly for nudists, attracted by the remote and sandy beaches. The best known is the Camping, or Theologians beach, at the north of the island, opposite the uninhabited island of Diplo. The far end of the town beach is also nudist, as is the Perigiali beach. However most of the other beaches on Antiparos are textile. Since the 1990s there has been a steady development due to its proximity to Paros, and the infrastructure has been improved to accommodate the growing influx of tourists.

== Archaeology ==
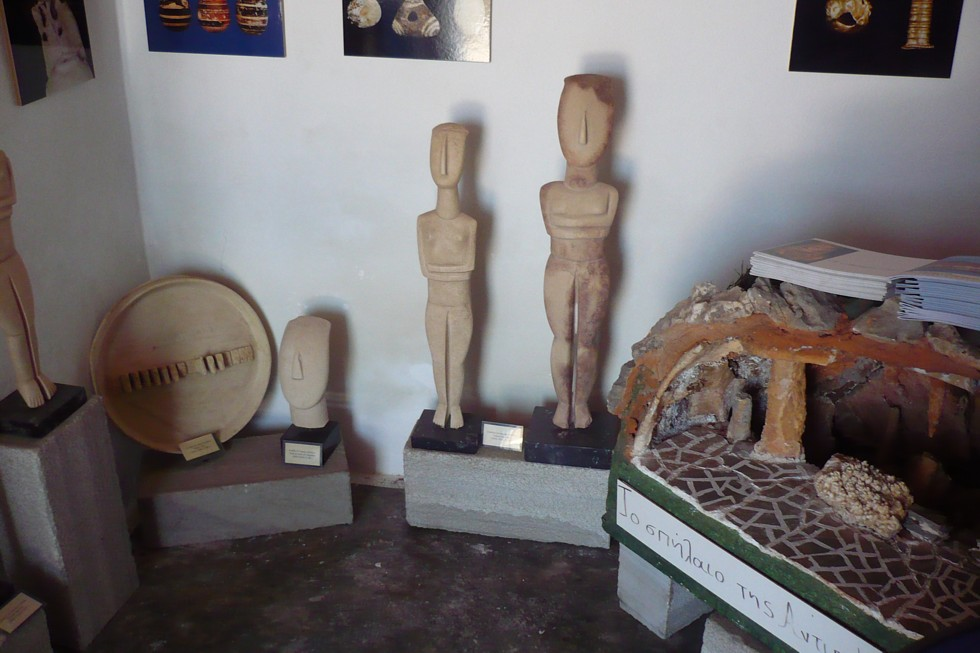
Exhibits at the local museum

There are extensive Neolithic remains on the island. It seems the first excavations were those made by the traveller Theodore Bent, with his wife Mabel, in early 1884, opening up some 40 graves in two cemeteries. In 1889 Christos Tsountas excavated in Despotiko, revealing Cycladic cemeteries. From 1964 to 1965 a Neolithic settlement was excavated on the island of Saliagos by Colin Renfrew and J D Evans for the British School at Athens. Stone foundations of buildings, obsidian arrowheads and pottery were found, together with a marble figurine known as the Fat lady of Saliagos.

Classical remains are concentrated on the island of Despotiko. The Isle of Antiparos was identified with ancient Prepesintho, according to the extant writings of Strabo and Pliny.

In 1959 Nikos Zafiropoulos began excavations at Zoumparia and Mantra, on the northeast coast, where there were architecturally Doric temples from the ancient times, dating to 500 BC.

In 1997, the archaeologist Yiannos Kourayos began new excavations at Mantra, bringing to light some of the ancillary buildings of a sanctuary. The temple itself has not so far been discovered, though a number of architectural elements from an early Doric temple have been discovered built into later walls. The main finding so far has been an elongated building, consisting of five consecutive parallel rooms. In the southern room archaic materials of Eastern Aegean, Rhodian, Cypriot and Egyptian origin have been discovered.

Many marble sculptures were found, including two archaic kouros heads, a naked male statue, part of the Archaic period perirrantiriou inscribed with the inscription "Marda anethiken". Among the significant findings include the built-square marble altar dedicated to Hestia Isthmus of classical times and which is testimony to one of the deities worshiped in the Cyclades.

== History ==
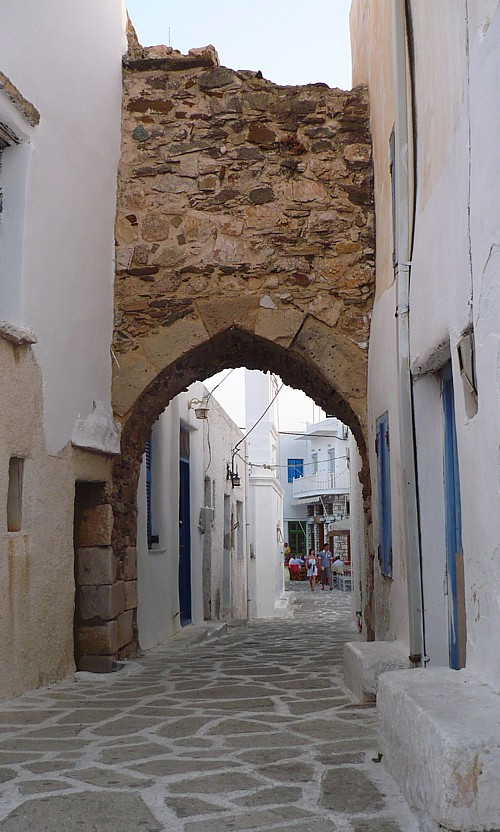
The "Camara" (entrance to the Kastro)

The island, under the name Oliarus or Oliaros, was noted by several ancient authors including Pliny the Elder, Strabo, Virgil, and Stephanus of Byzantium. According to Heraclides Ponticus, it was colonised by Sidonians.

During Byzantine times and down to the 13th century, information about the history of Antiparos is scarce. However, in 1207, Antiparos was seized by the Venetian nobleman Marco I Sanudo, and it remained under the house of Sanudo down to the second half of the 14th century, when it passed to the House of Sommaripa. It then passed to the House of Loredan, with Giovanni Loredan building the Castle of Antiparos in 1440 and bringing inhabitants to the island at his own expense. In 1480 it passed to the Venetian house of Pisani.

The Venetian episode came to an end in 1537, during the reign of lady Adriana Crispo, when Antiparos and the rest of the Cyclades fell to the Ottomans, and it remained under Ottoman rule until the Greek War of Independence in 1821, apart from a period of the Orlov Revolt in 1770–74 when it was ruled by the Russians, who removed many of the magnificent stalactites from the cave to the Hermitage Museum in Russia.

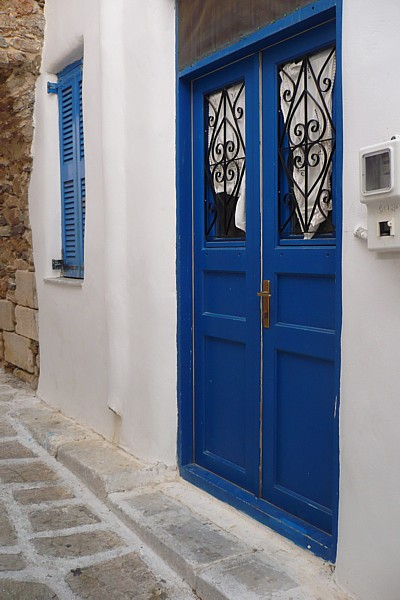
The "Ksopyrga"

The major catastrophe was in 1794, when Kefalonians and Mani pirates arrived on the island and plundered, and kidnapped the daughter of the Venetian vice-Consul.

The Antiparians were among the first in the Cyclades to take part in the War of Independence and in 1832 officially became part of the Greek state.

During World War II, the southwestern tip of the island near the Agios George, was used as a secret submarine base, but after the war it became once more a tranquil place, though now growing as a tourist village.

Antiparos was known to the wider Greek public in 1960 and through the Greek cinema, where workshops hosted by Finos Films in the heart of the movie Madalena by helping to enhance its natural beauty and historical landscape. Since then, the island became a tourist destination for Greek and foreign tourists in the summer and the economy of the town started oriented tourism development.

== Architecture ==
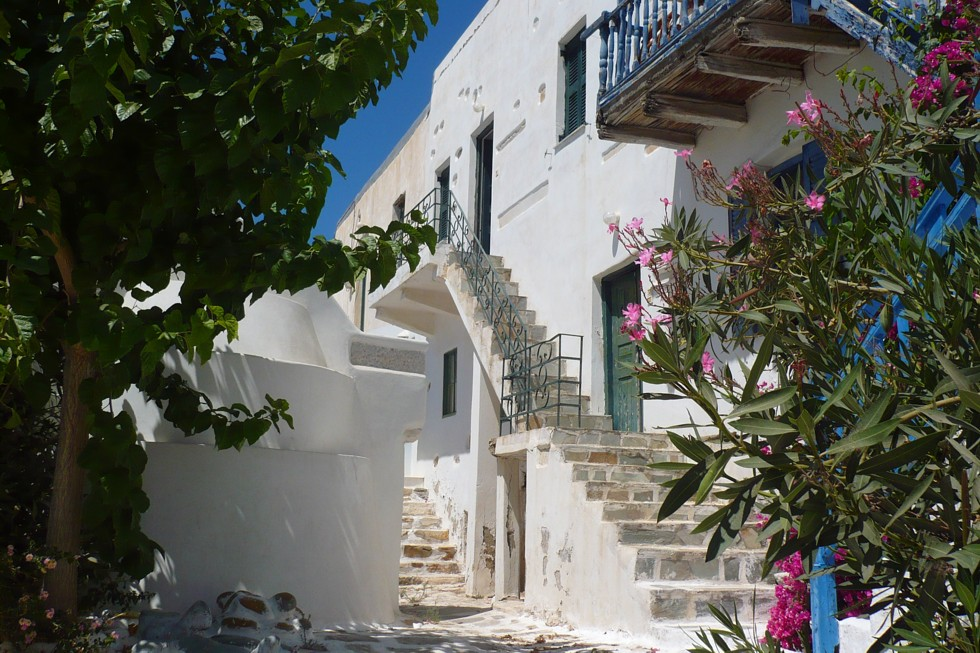
Kastro architecture

The architecture, like all the Cycladic islands, requires strict regulations to preserve the uniformity of the Cyclades, which is composed of the typical white houses with blue doors and windows, yard and gardens decorated with bougainvillea and other flowers. Often these characteristics are consistent with the existence of stone or alleys of the neighborhood or the fences of the churchyard.

The castle was built in 1440 by Giovanni Loredan and seems to have a very specific and unique style of architecture. The houses form a compact complex with 24 two-story houses forming the outer zone, while at the centre there is a motte or mound, till recently occupied by a water reservoir. Among the houses there are three churches and the old aqueduct. The houses have mostly been turned round to face outwards where they act as shops.

== Sights ==
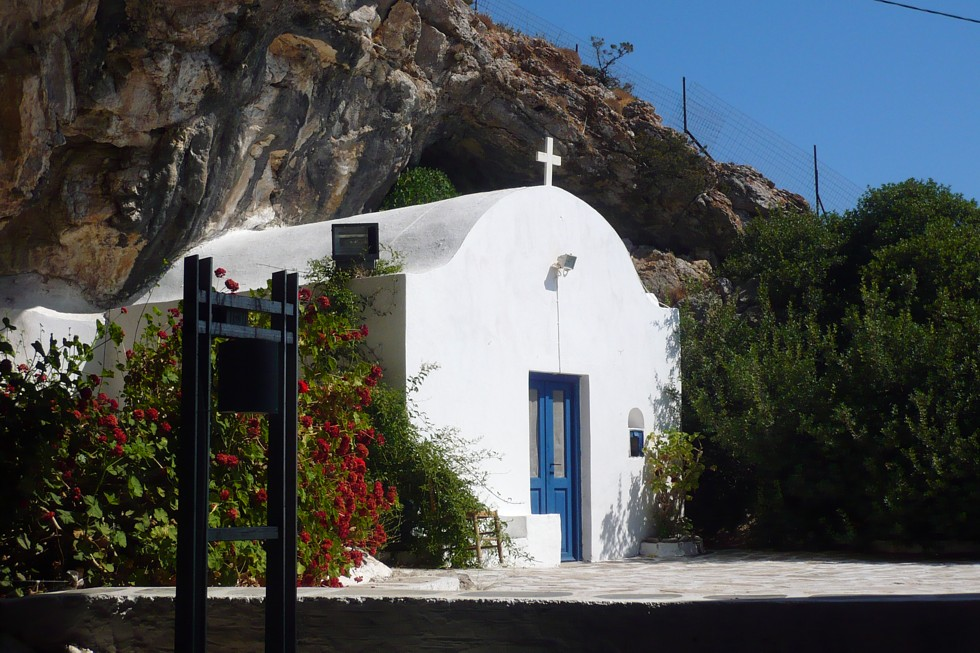
The church of Saint John, "O Spiliotis"

In the center of the island is the cave of Antiparos, one of the most beautiful and mysterious caves in the world. The cave has been used as a natural shelter from the Neolithic period onwards. The area was also used for pottery, and for the worship of the goddess Artemis, while at the entrance to the site is the church of Agios Ioannis Spiliotis.

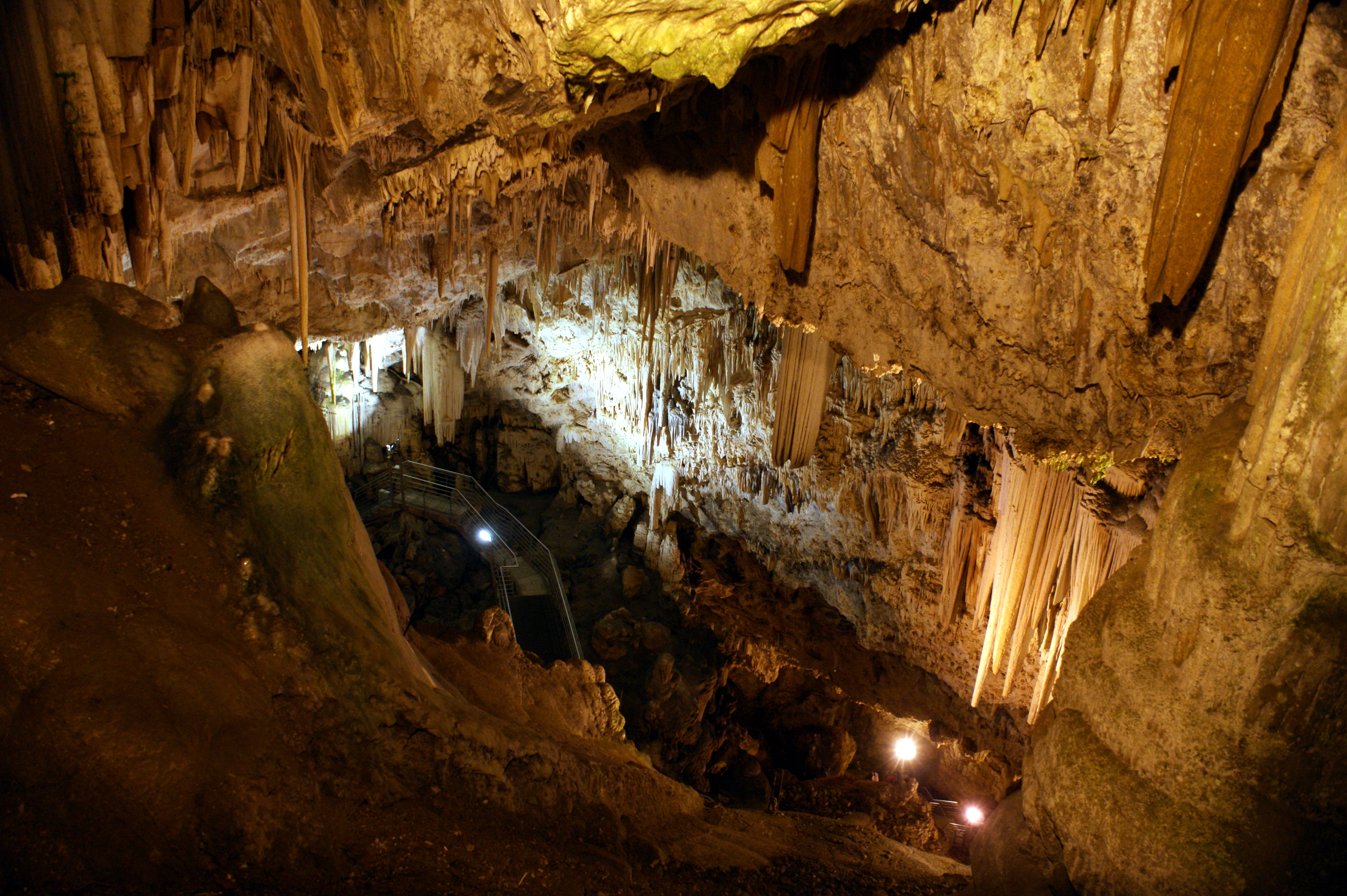
The Antiparos cavern

Signs and scratches on the stalactites and stalagmites attest to the passers, as the inscription on the altar of the generals of Alexander the Great and King Otto.

=== The cave of Antiparos ===
The cave is very extensive, and extends at several levels. The lyric poet Archilochus of Paros is said to have left an inscription in the cave. In 1673, marquis de Nointel, French ambassador to the Ottoman Empire, visited the cave for three days with numerous companions and celebrated mass on Christmas Day in it. Later visitors who carved their names include Lord Byron and the first modern King of Greece, Otto. During the German occupation, part of the cave was destroyed. The cave was renovated extensively in the second half of the 20th century, using funds from the EU by erecting barriers, building adequate steps, installing lighting, security cameras and loudspeakers to inform visitors.

=== Castle (Kastro) of Antiparos ===
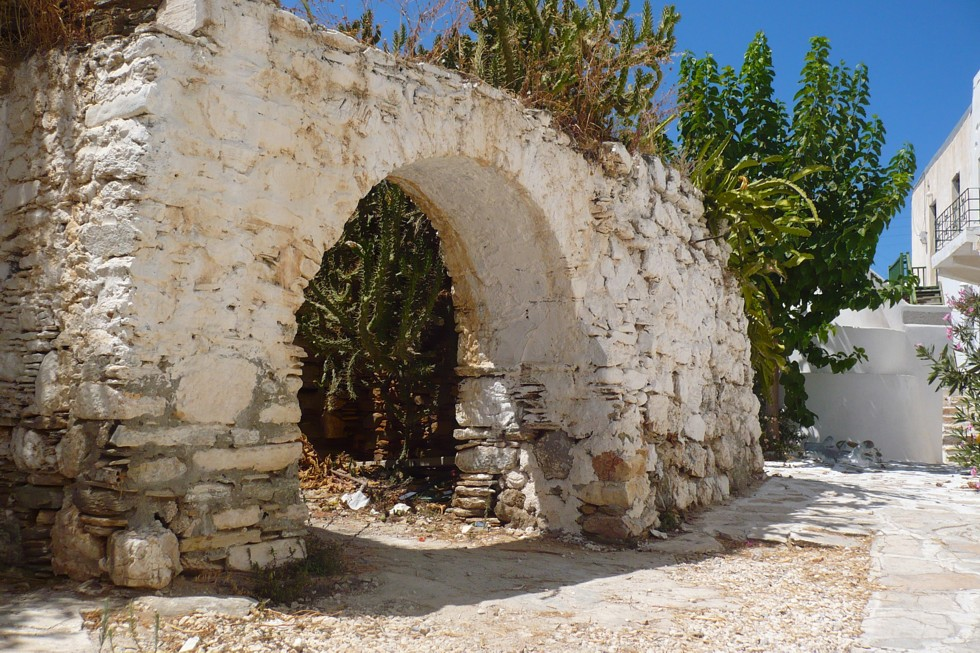
The castle tower

The Venetian Castle of Antiparos is a typical example of the fortified settlements established in the Cyclades during the period of the Latins in 13th-16th century. Its construction dates to the mid-15th century when the Venetian Giovanni Loredano decided to marry Mary Sommaripa of Antiparos.

The original version had a ‘motte’ (mound) at the centre and houses round the perimeter. The houses were built as one continuous block construction, the outer walls providing both the defensive wall of the fortified settlement. The only entrance was at the south wing. Inside the main settlement the houses developed as three-storey structures, each having a separate entrance which leads to an external staircase. In the course of the settlement was extended outside the south wing to form a rectangular ring called "Xopyrga" and within the original enclosure around the base of the circular tower.

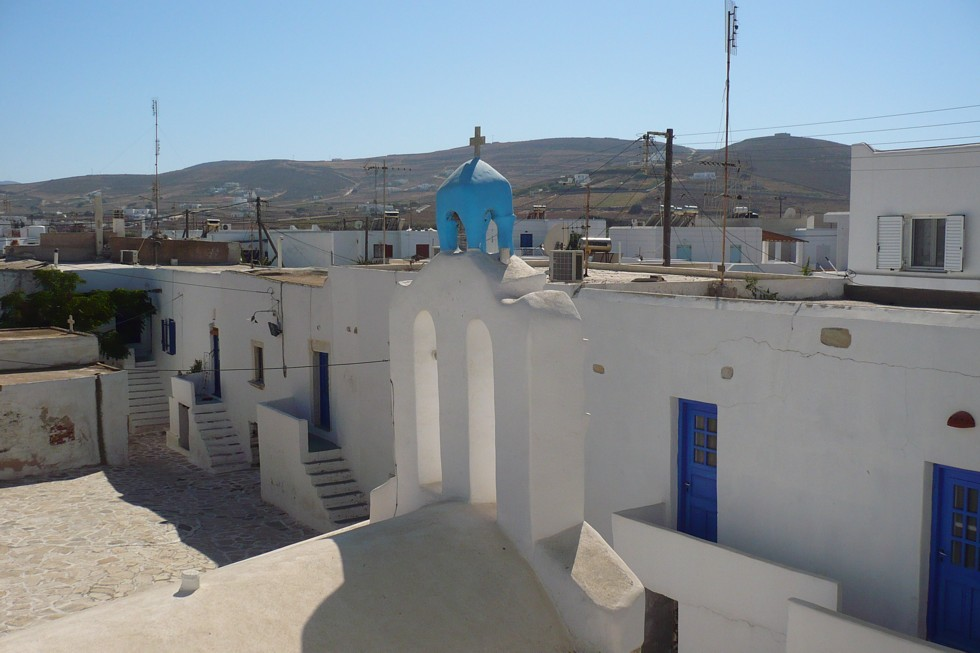
Castle house blocks and the church of Christ

In modern times, the original architectural style of the castle has altered, with the church of Christ being inserted as a religious element, while the central mound was used as a water tank tower. Today, the homes retain a satisfactory level of their original features, despite the collapse of the upper floors, and any intervention required permission from the archaeological department. Today most homes are developed in one with two floors and have a maximum ground-like trapdoor. Many now face outwards and have become shops facing onto the main street.

An integral part of the castle of Antiparos are the small bats that come with dusk and fly around the tower to the east.

== Infrastructure ==
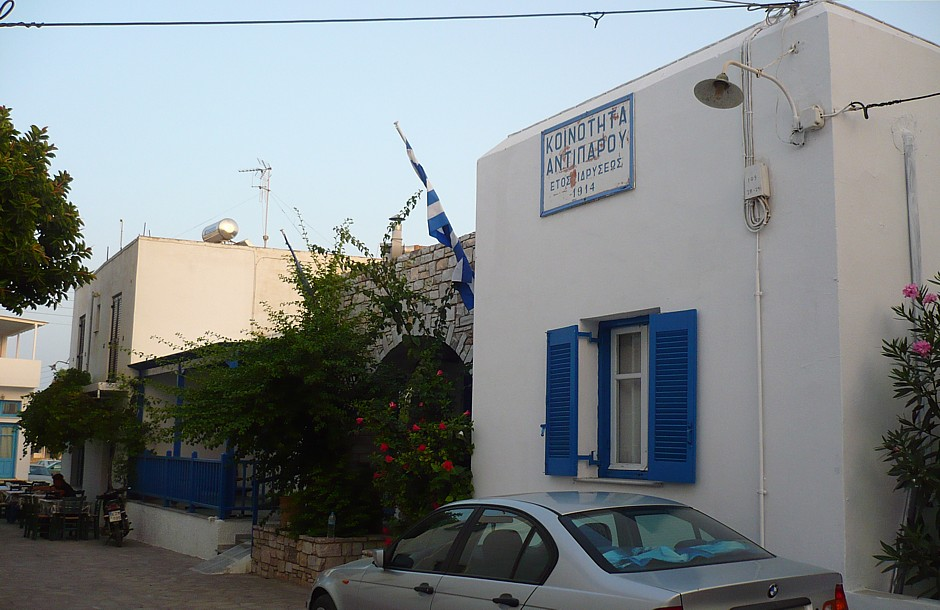
Antiparos Municipality Hall

The town hall of Antiparos lies with the Multi-alley clinic in a commercial road just in front of the castle, near the Plaza Roussos which took its name from the writer of the film Madalena.

Any waste transported to the island a special place in Paros and sewerage and biological treatment have been included in the NSRF to sponsor the Egnatia Odos.

The island has a modern road construction and rehabilitation of the coastal road. The focus of artistic and political events is the stone square of Agia Marina.

The elementary school has a youth club for young people.

== Church ==
The Antiparos church belongs to the Bishopric Paronaxia.

== Cinema ==
- Madalena (1960 film)
- Suntan (2016 film)

== Gallery ==
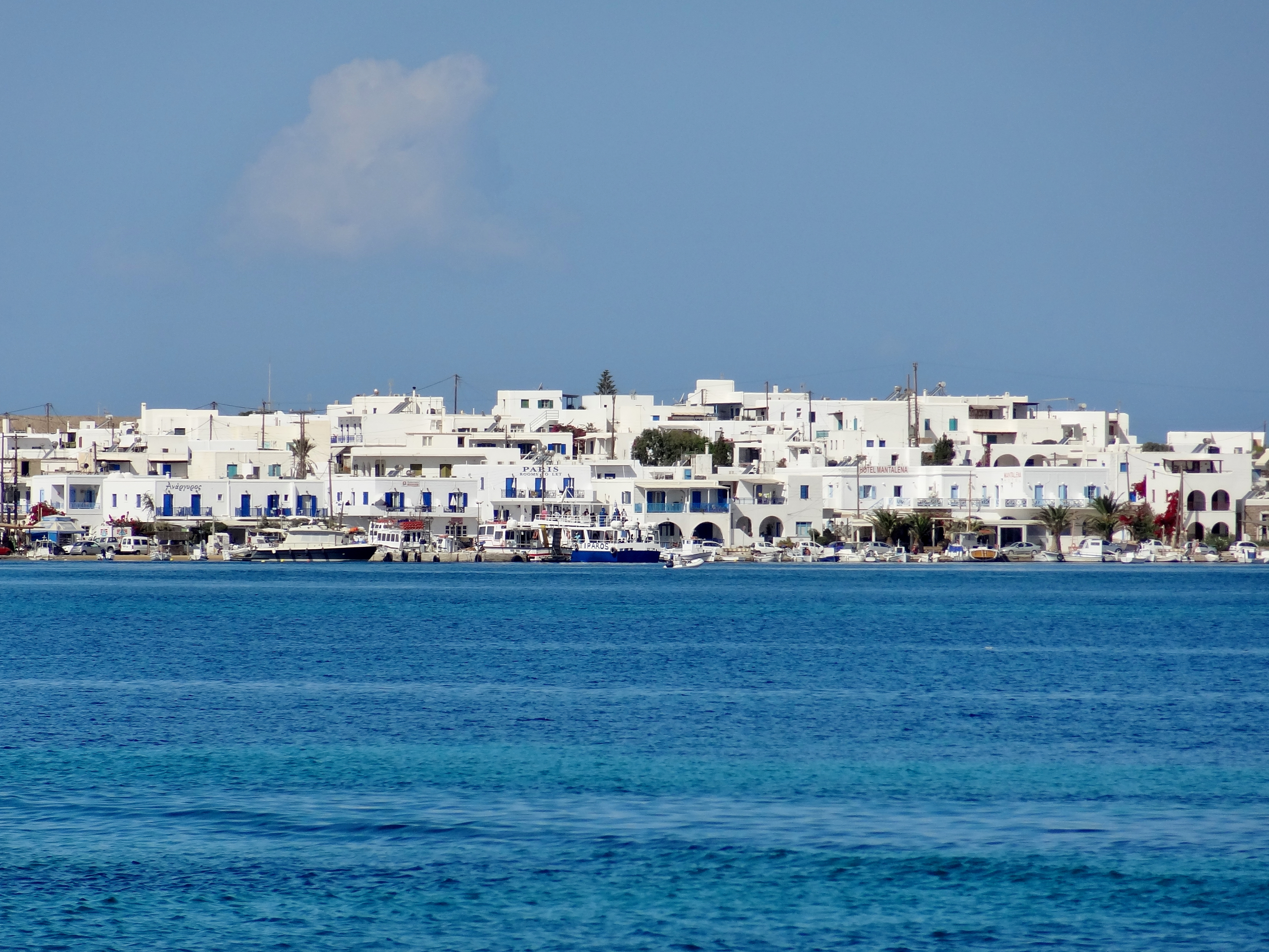
Antiparos, view from Pounta, Paros

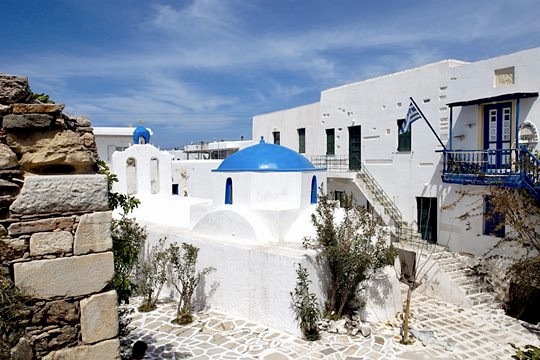
Castle of Antiparos, built by Giovanni Loredan

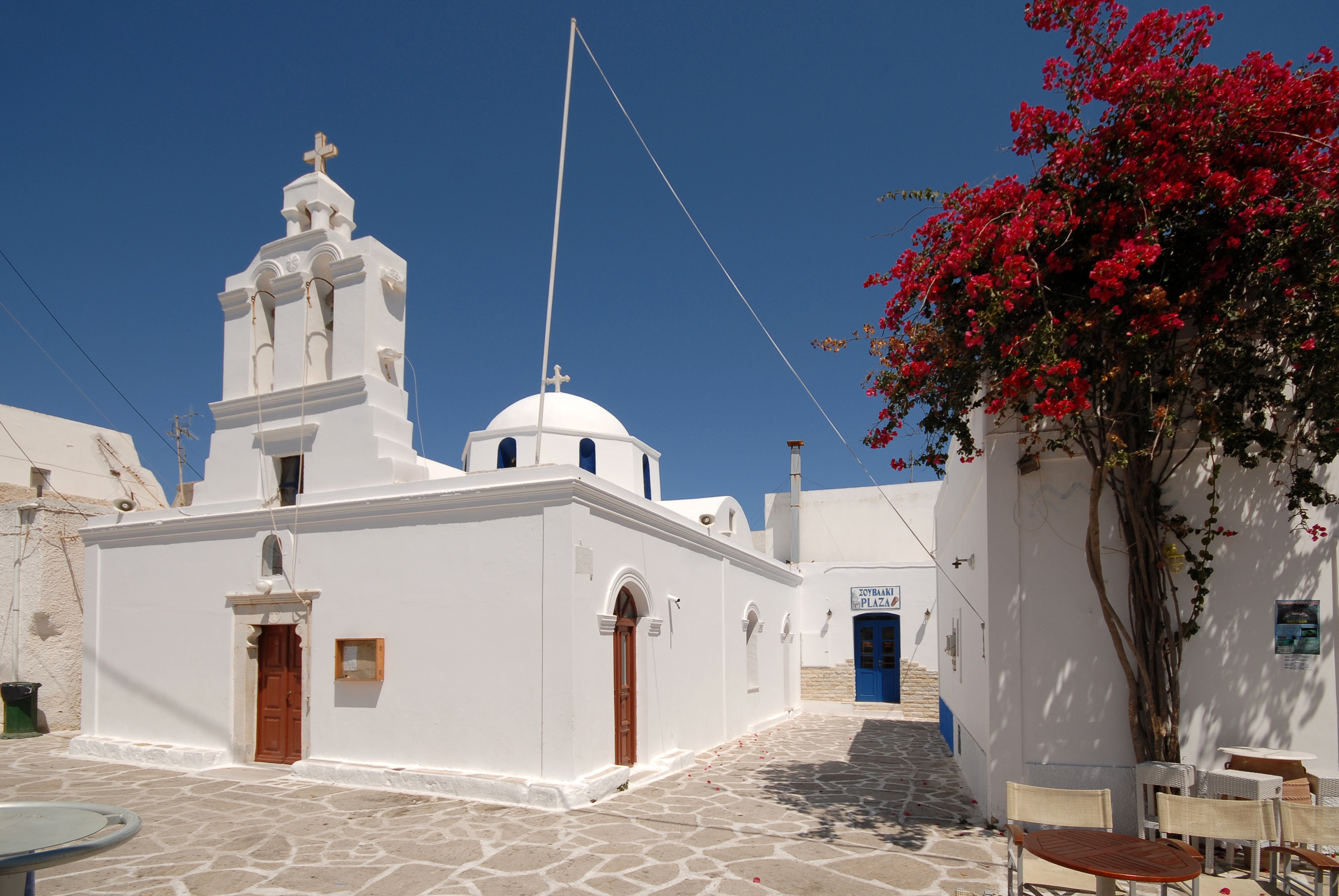
Antiparos Chora

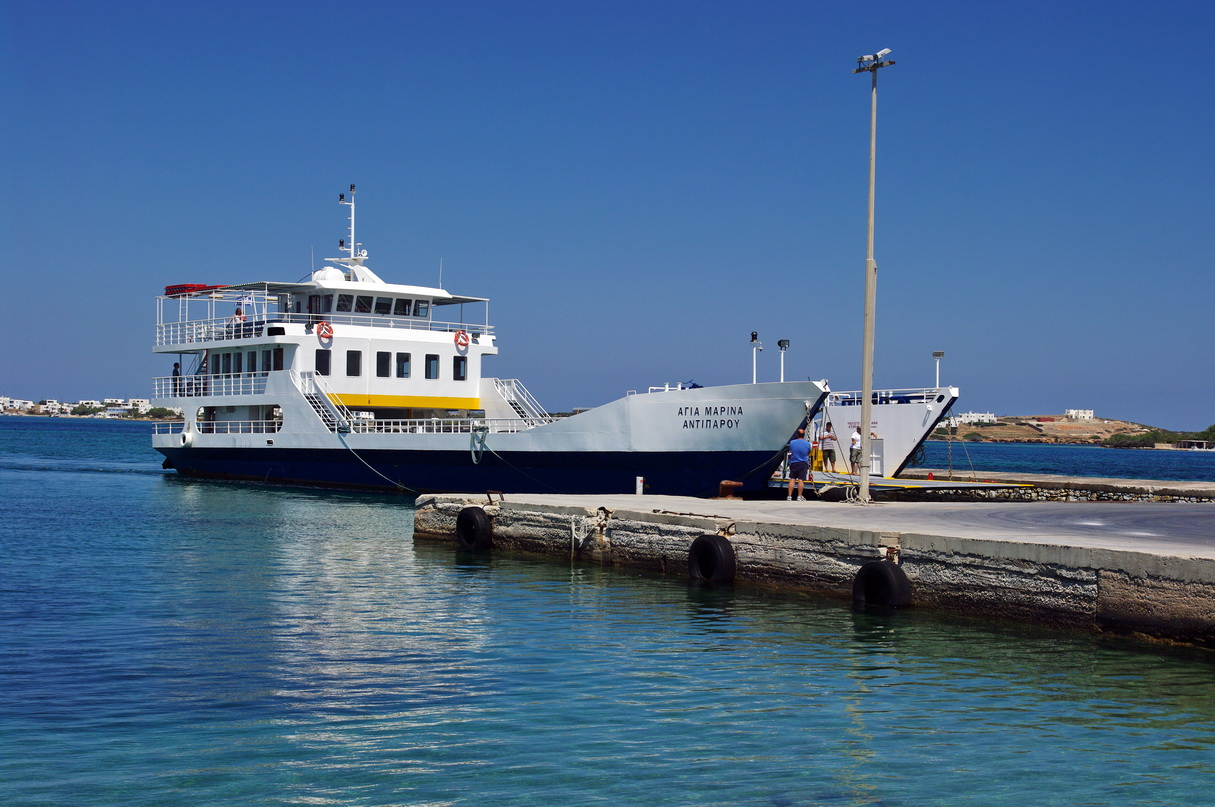
Ferry boat Paros - Antiparos

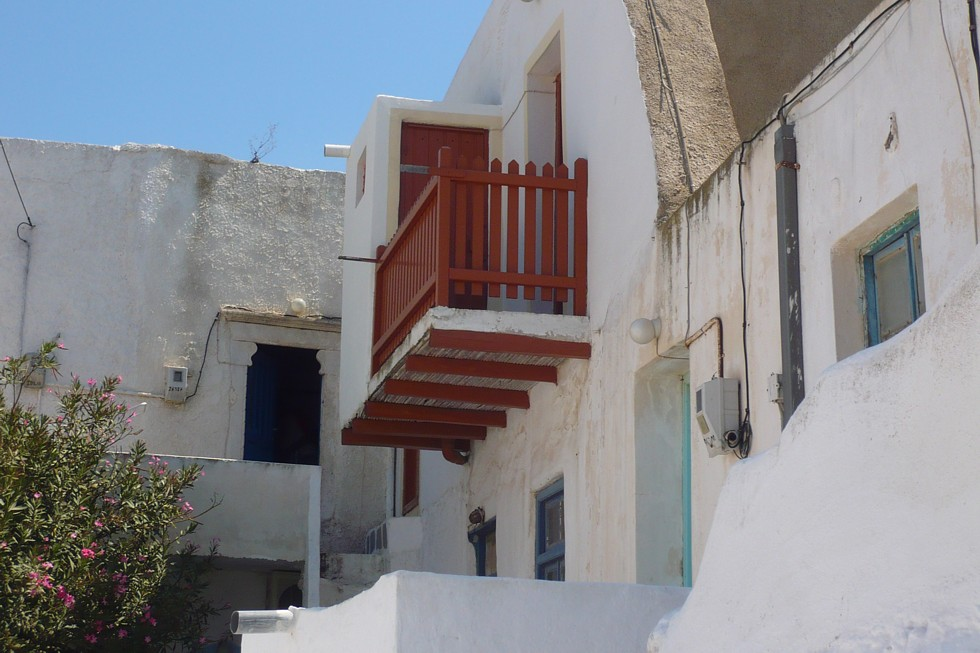
The house where Madalena was filmed, starring Aliki Vougiouklaki, castle district

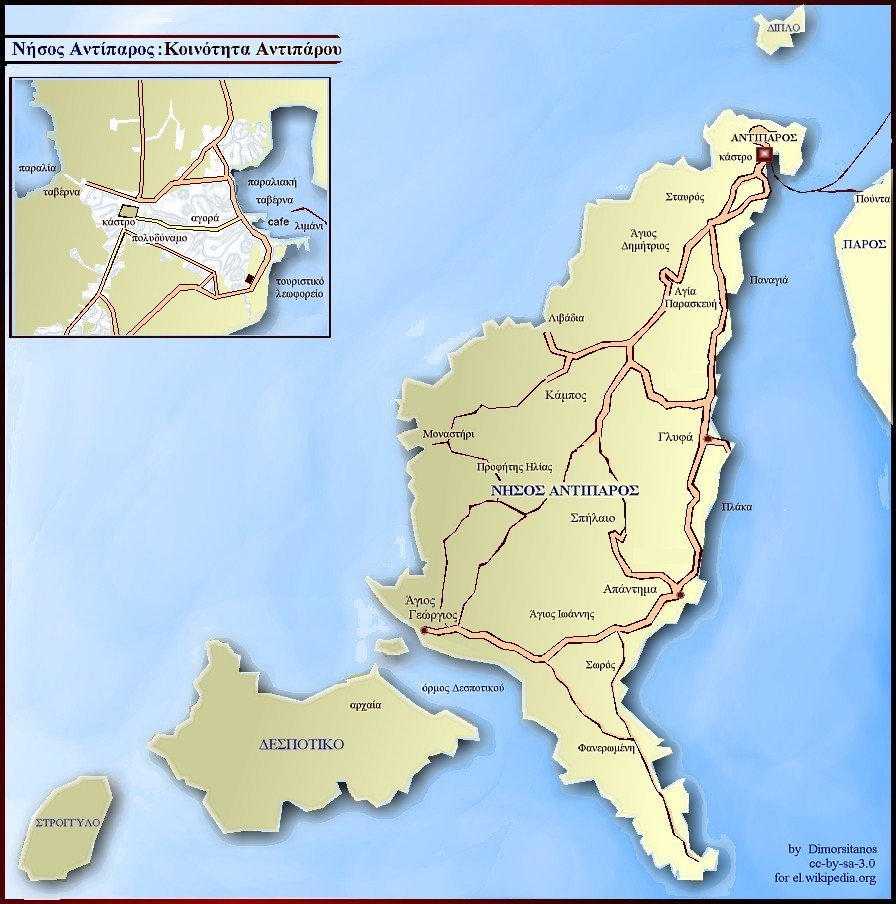
Map of Antiparos & Despotiko islands
