= Sikinos =

Island in the Cyclades, Greece

Sikinos Σίκινος
- Municipality
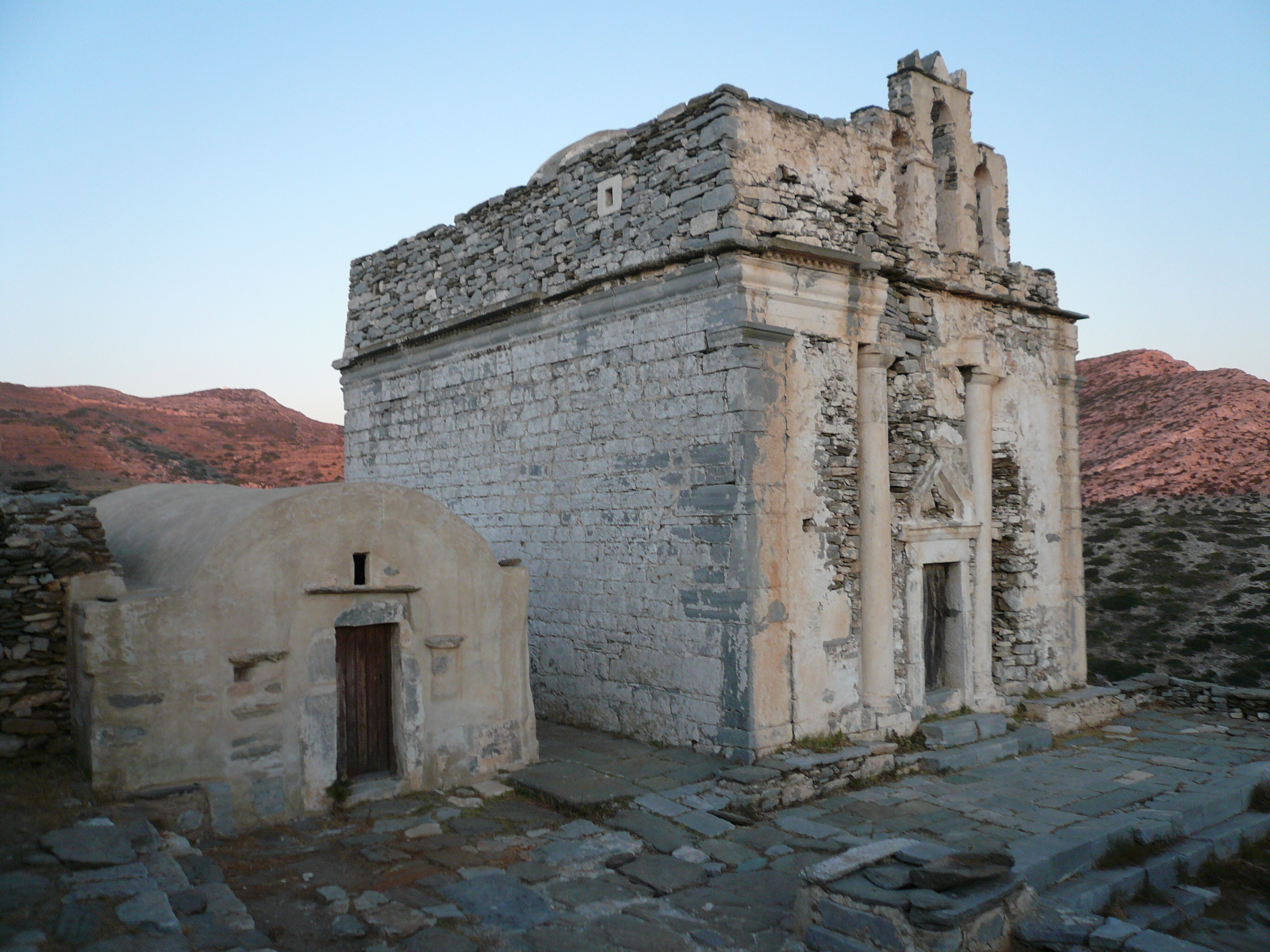
- Remains of the medieval Episkopi church

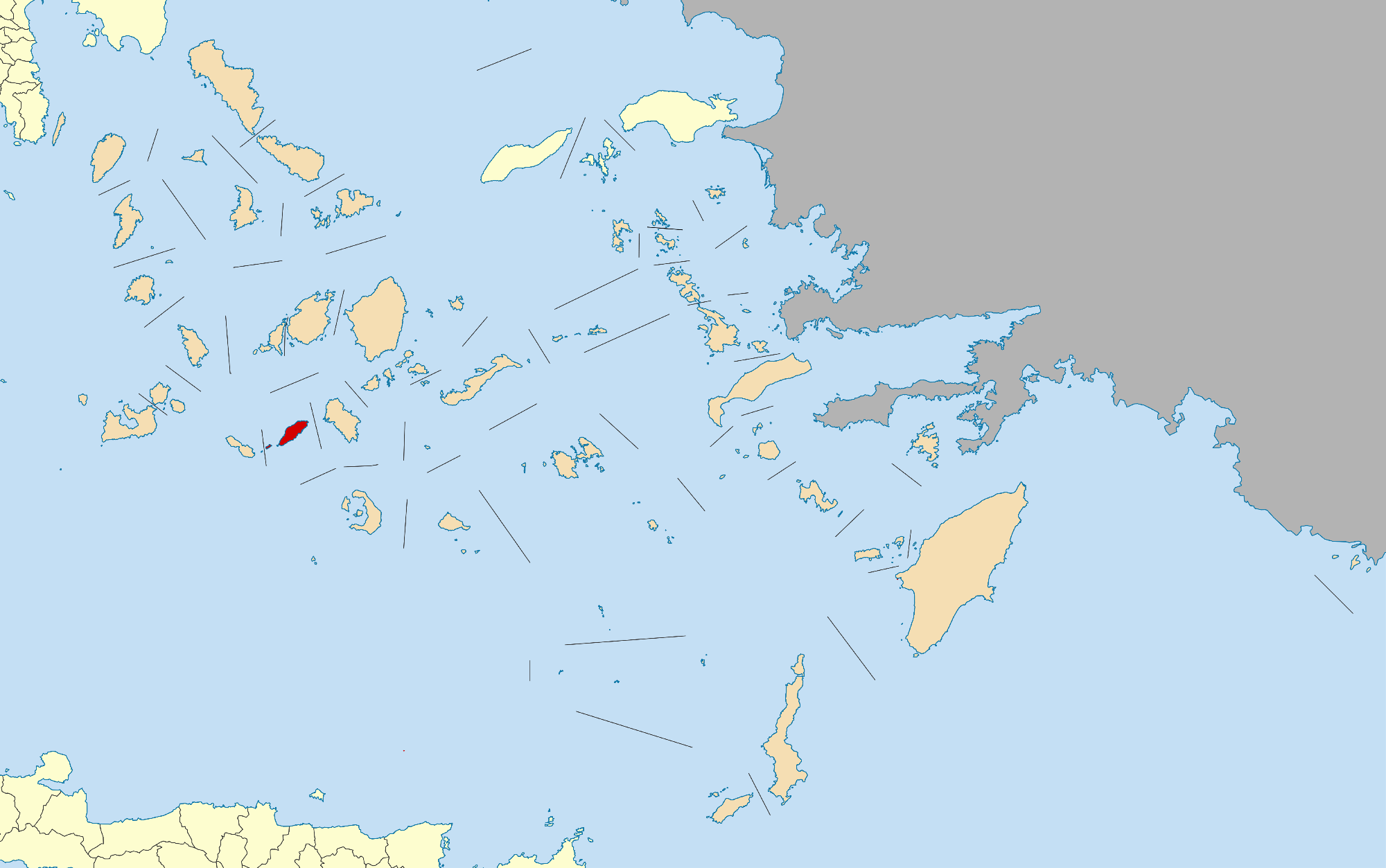

- Location within Greece
- Coordinates: 36°40′32″N 25°6′58″E
- Country: Greece
- Administrative region: South Aegean
- Regional unit: Thira

Area
  - Municipality: 42.507 km^{2} (16.412 sq mi)
- Highest elevation: 552 m (1,811 ft)
- Lowest elevation: 0 m (0 ft)

Population (2021)
  - Municipality: 253
  - Density: 5.95/km^{2} (15.4/sq mi)
- Time zone: UTC+2 (EET)
  - Summer (DST): UTC+3 (EEST)
- Postal code: 840 10
- Area code: 22860
- Vehicle registration: EM
- Website: www.sikinos.gr, http://www.photosikinos.com

Sikinos (Greek: Σίκινος) is a Greek island and municipality in the Cyclades. It is located midway between the islands of Ios and Folegandros. Sikinos is part of the Thira regional unit.

It was known as Oenoe or Oinoe (Ancient Greek: Οἰνόη, Island of Wine) in Ancient Greece. It contrasts with nearby islands, such as Ios, in being quiet and relatively less developed. There are two villages, "Allopronia" on the south sea side, being the port, and another higher up in the hills being the chora. The chora up on the hills is composed of two settlements adjacent to each other, "Castro" to the west and "Chorio" to the east. There are a handful of tavernas in the chora and harbor. The beach at the harbor is one of two large sandy beaches on the island. Several ancient ruins rest on the island, although some are remote. There are three paved roads, one built to connect to the heliport and the other sandy beach, and there are several well-maintained dirt roads, and seven mapped footpaths. Much of the island is very difficult to access due to the terrain. Nearly all of the island's area is covered by terraces once used for extensive agriculture. Now only a handful are used across the island, most operating on government subsidies. The municipality had 253 inhabitants at the 2021 census. It includes the uninhabited island of Kardiotissa and other uninhabited islets. Its total land area is 42.507 square kilometres (16.412 sq mi).

In antiquity, the island contained a town of the same name. It is said to have been originally called Oenoë from its cultivation of the vine, but to have been named Sicinos after a son of Thoas and Oenoe. It was probably colonised by Ionians. Like most of the other Grecian islands, it submitted to Xerxes I in the Greco-Persian Wars, but it afterwards formed part of the Athenian maritime empire. There are some remains of the ancient city situated upon a lofty and rugged mountain.

There is also still extant an ancient temple of the Pythian Apollo, now converted into the church Episkopí (ἡ Ἐπισκοπή). It stands in a depression between the main range of mountains, and the summit lying more to the left, upon which the ruins of the ancient city stand. We learn from an inscription found there by Ross that it was the temple of the Pythian Apollo. The site was visited by the British explorer Theodore Bent and his wife in January 1884. In 2022, the Ephorate of Antiquities of the Cyclades was awarded the Europa Nostra Award for its work excavating and restoring the monument, now considered a Roman mausoleum and later Byzantine church.
