= Folegandros =

Greek island in the Aegean Sea

Folegandros Φολέγανδρος
- Municipality
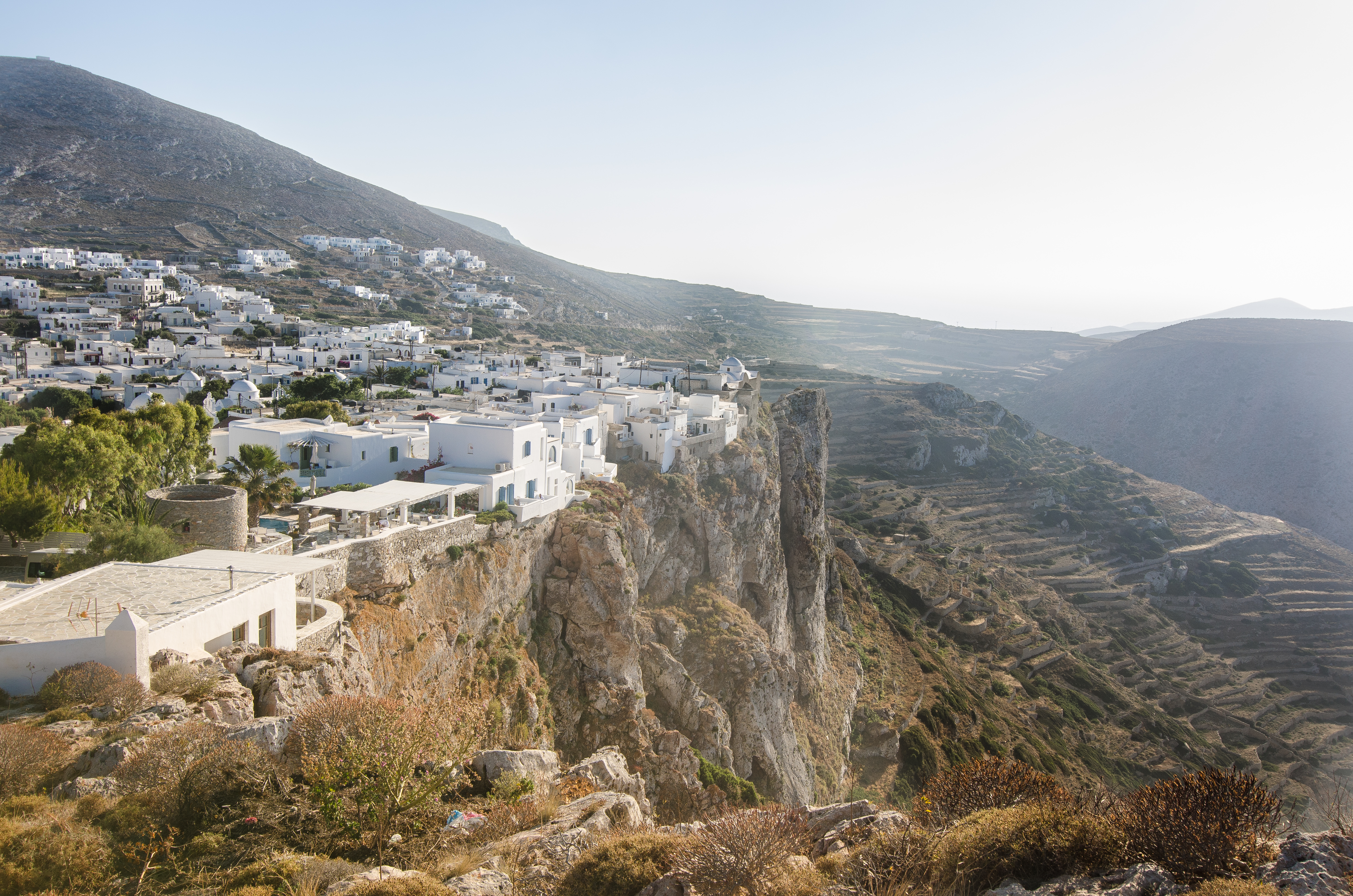
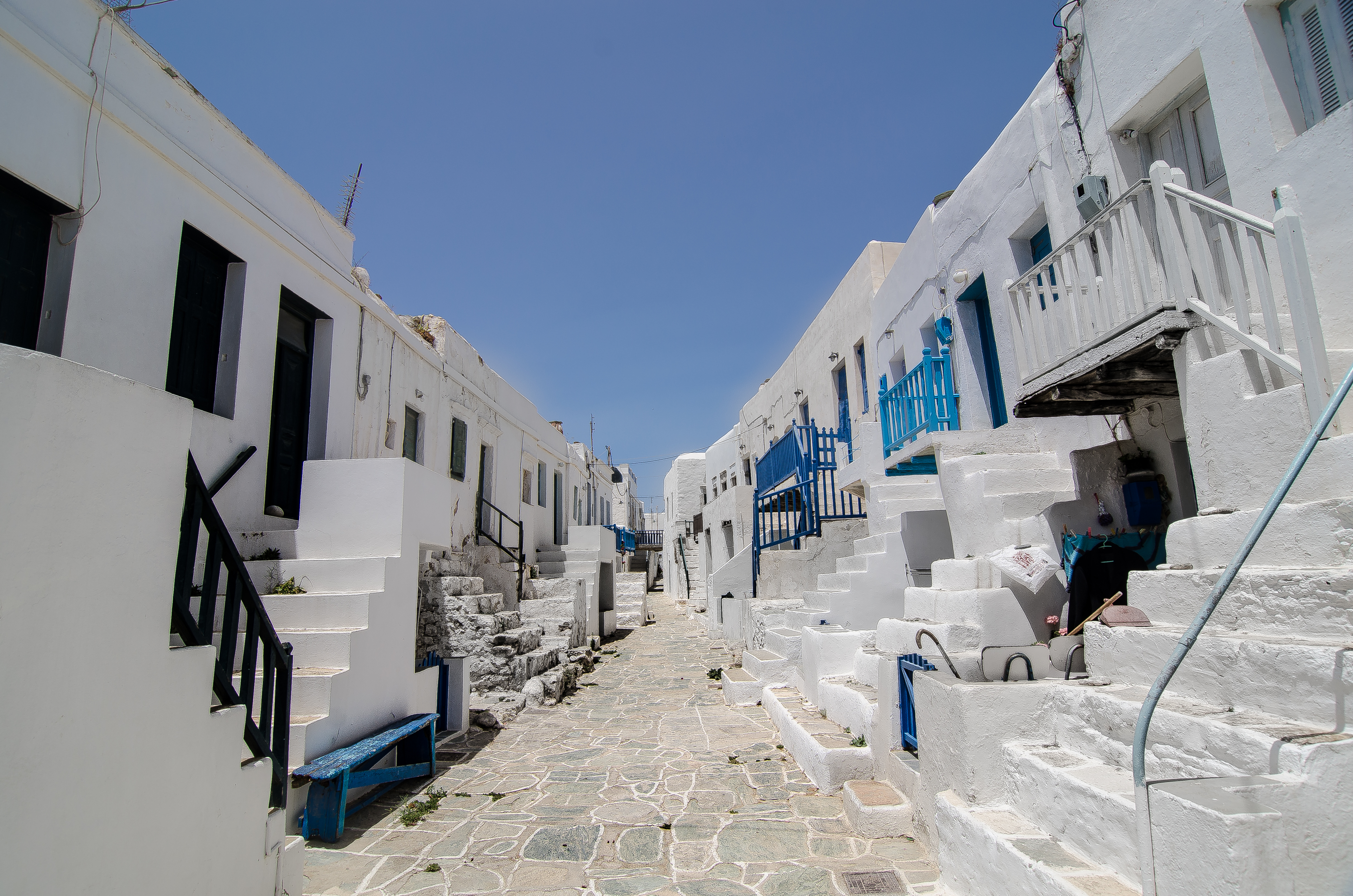
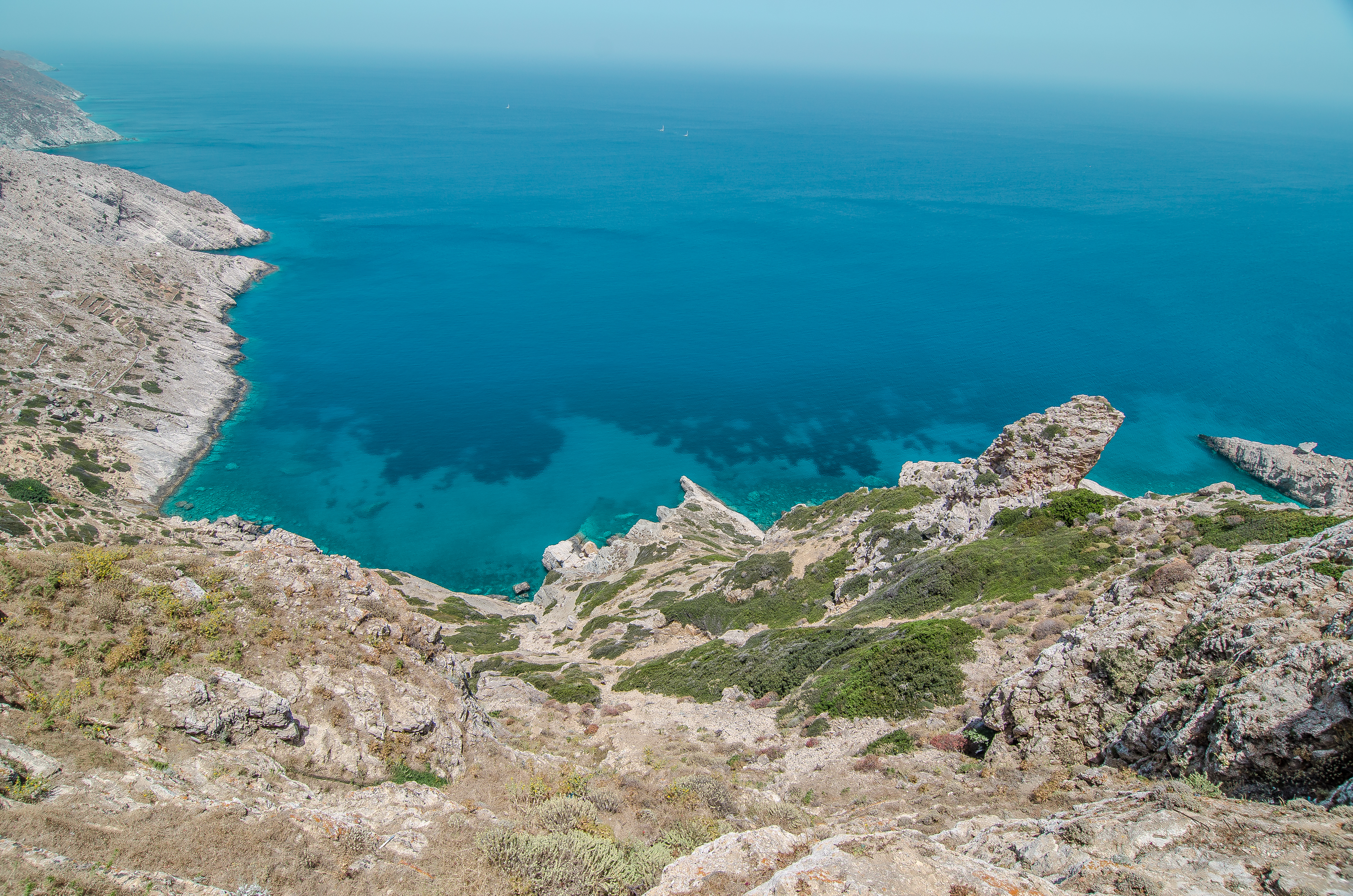
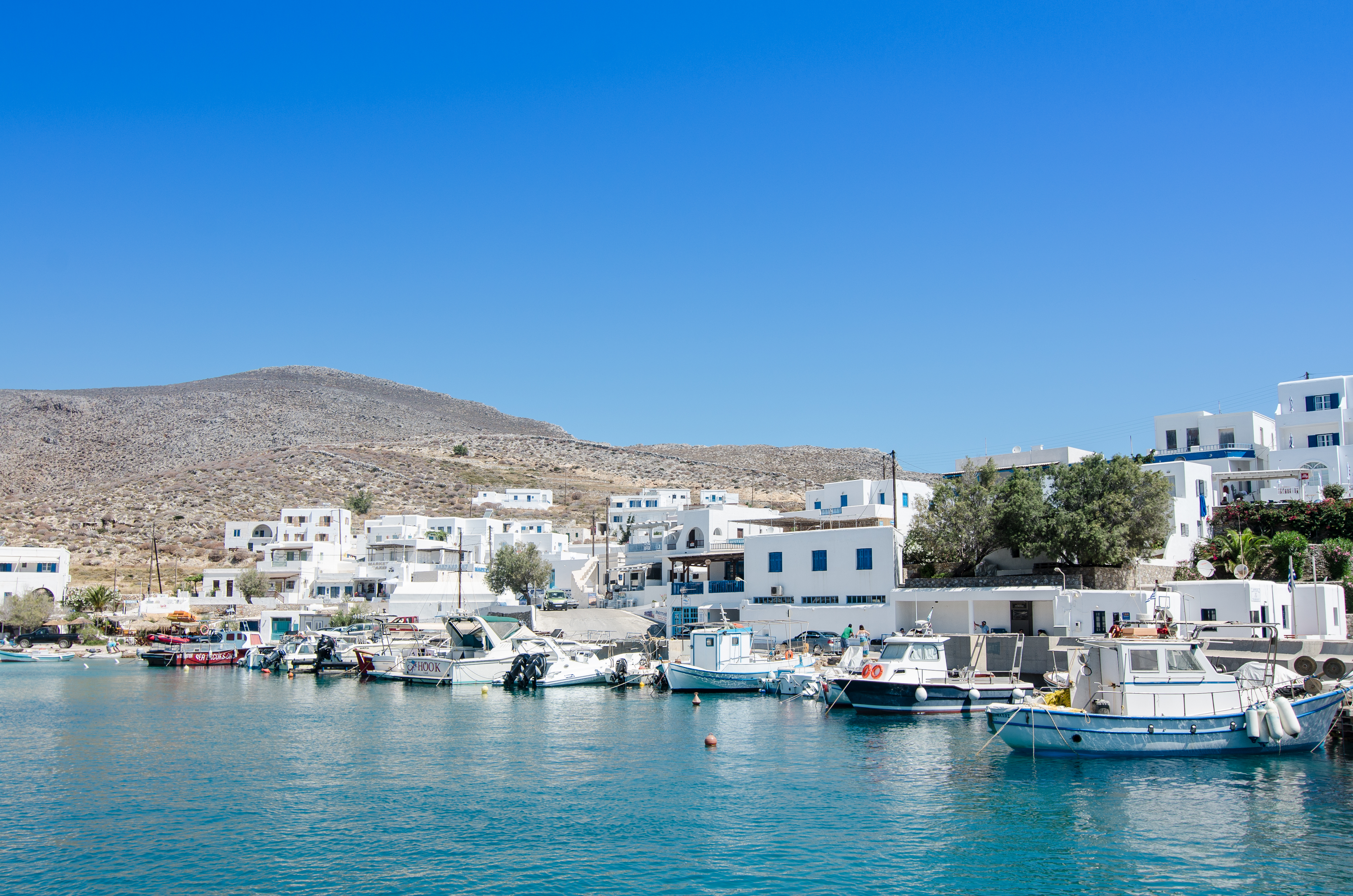
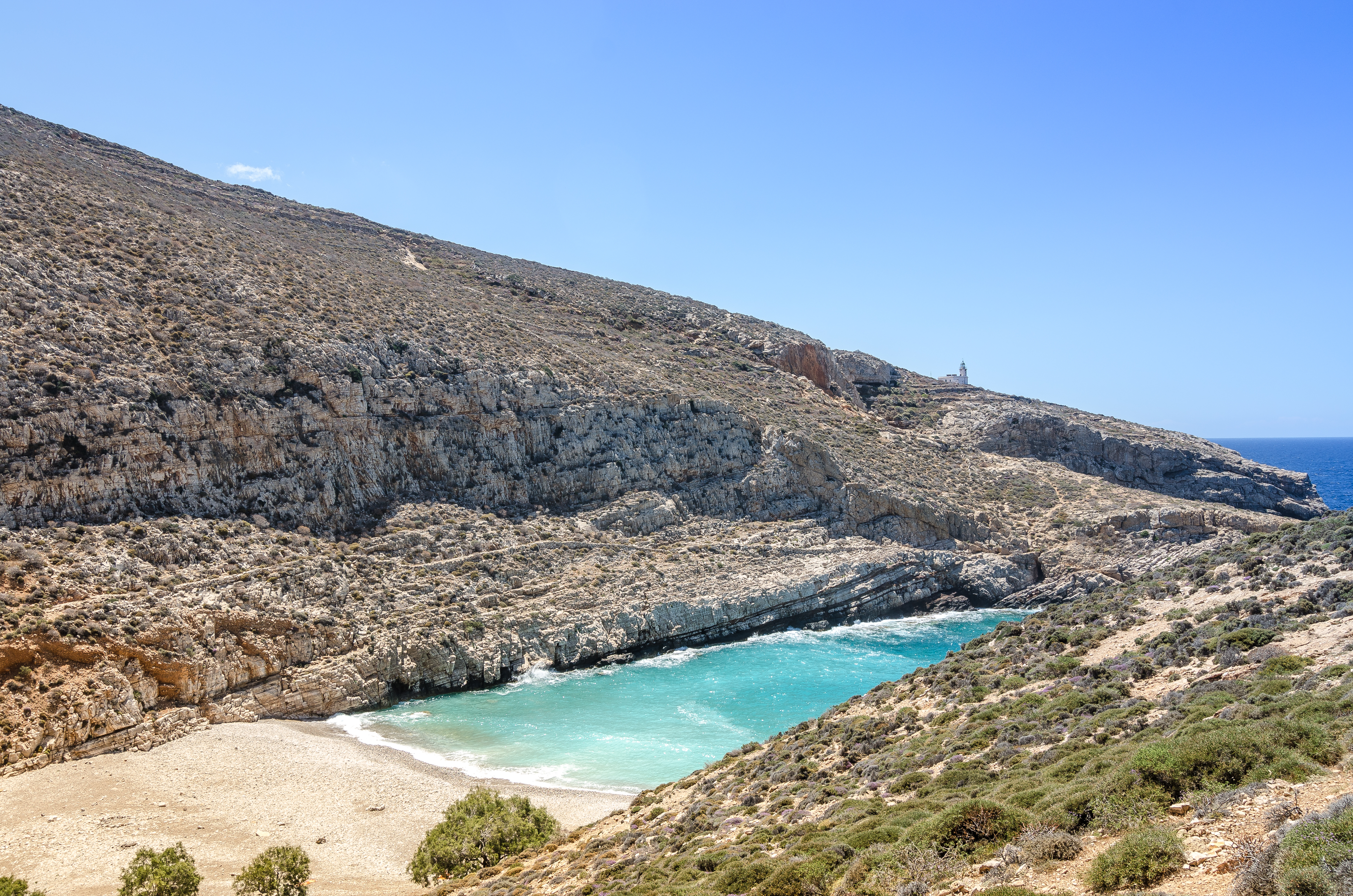
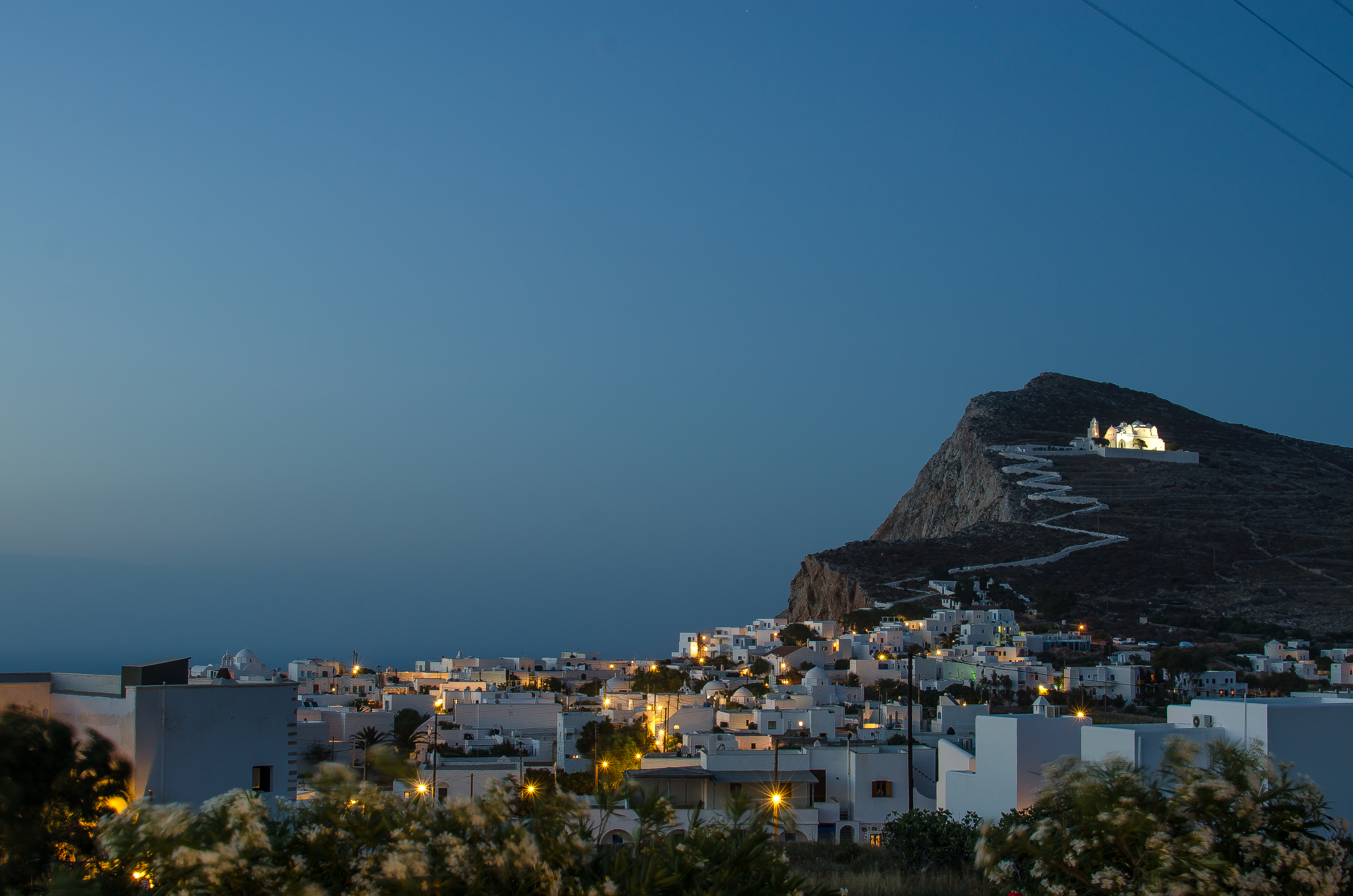
- Cliffs at Chora on Folegandros

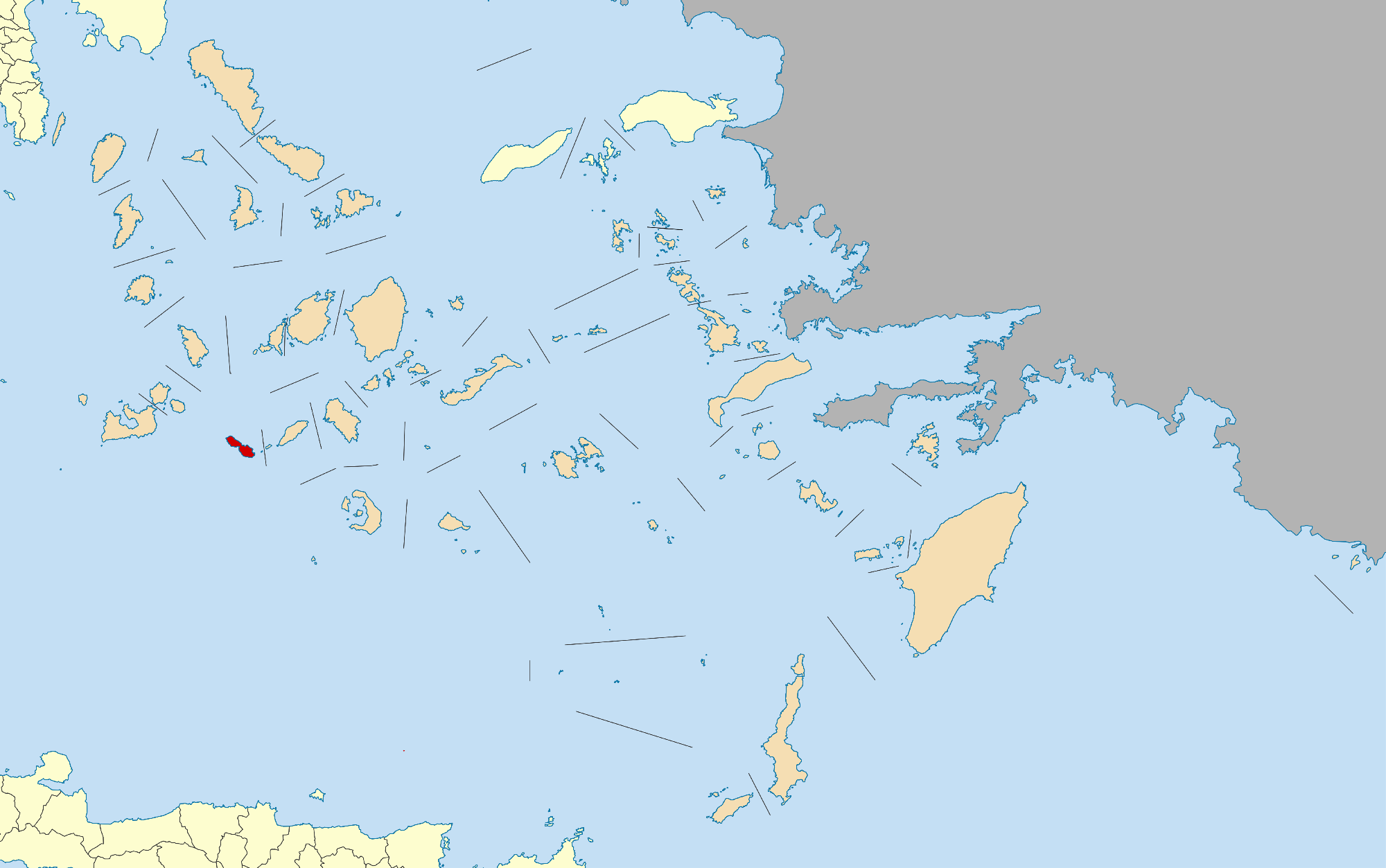

- Location within Greece
- Coordinates: 36°37′N 24°54′E
- Country: Greece
- Administrative region: South Aegean
- Regional unit: Thira

Area
  - Municipality: 32.216 km^{2} (12.439 sq mi)
- Highest elevation: 455 m (1,493 ft)
- Lowest elevation: 0 m (0 ft)

Population (2021)
  - Municipality: 719
  - Density: 22.3/km^{2} (57.8/sq mi)
  - Community: 455
- Time zone: UTC+2 (EET)
  - Summer (DST): UTC+3 (EEST)
- Postal code: 840 xx
- Area code: 22860
- Vehicle registration: EM
- Website: www.folegandros.gr

Folegandros (also Pholegandros; Greek: Φολέγανδρος, Greek pronunciation: [foˈleɣanðros]) is a small Greek island in the Aegean Sea that — together with Sikinos, Ios, Anafi, and Santorini — forms the southern part of the Cyclades.

The island's surface area is 32.216 km^{2} (12 sq mi; 3,222 ha; 7,961 acres).

As of 2021, the island had 719 inhabitants.

Folegandros has three small villages — Chora, Karavostasis, and Ano Meria — that are connected by a paved road. It is part of the Thira regional unit.

== Mythology ==
According to Greek mythology, the island was said to have derived its name from a son of Minos.

== History ==
Little is known about the ancient history of Folegandros. Its inhabitants were Dorians.

Later, the island came under Athenian rule. It contained a polis (city-state) called Pholegandros, which was sited at the modern Chora. It was a member of the Delian League, as which it appears on Athenian tribute lists between 425/424 and 416/415 BCE.

The Greek poet Aratus (c. 315/310 – 240 BCE) called the island the "iron Pholegandros" on account of its ruggedness. It was also noted by the ancient geographers Strabo and Ptolemy, the latter of whom called it Pholekandros (Ancient Greek: Φολέκανδρος).

In 1207, the Venetian Marco Sanudo conquered the island, which remained under the rule of Venice for more than three centuries.

In 1566, the Ottoman Turks took control of the island.

In the early 19th century, during the Greek war of independence from 1821 to 1829, the Greeks reclaimed control of the island, ending more than six centuries of foreign rule.

In early 1884, the island was visited by the British explorers Theodore and Mabel Bent.

During the 20th century, especially during the 4th of August regime from 1936 to 1941, the island was used as a place of exile for political prisoners.

== Geography ==
Folegandros' landscape is varied, including tall cliffs and a large cave. The "capital" of the island, Chora, is built on the edge of a 200 m (660 ft) high cliff.

The port of Folegandros is the small village of Karavostasis. The Ano Meria village contains a small but interesting Ecological and Folklore Museum.

Among the notable beaches on Folegandros is Katergo, accessible only by foot or by boat from Karavostasis. Katergo beach is used by naturists.

== Gallery ==
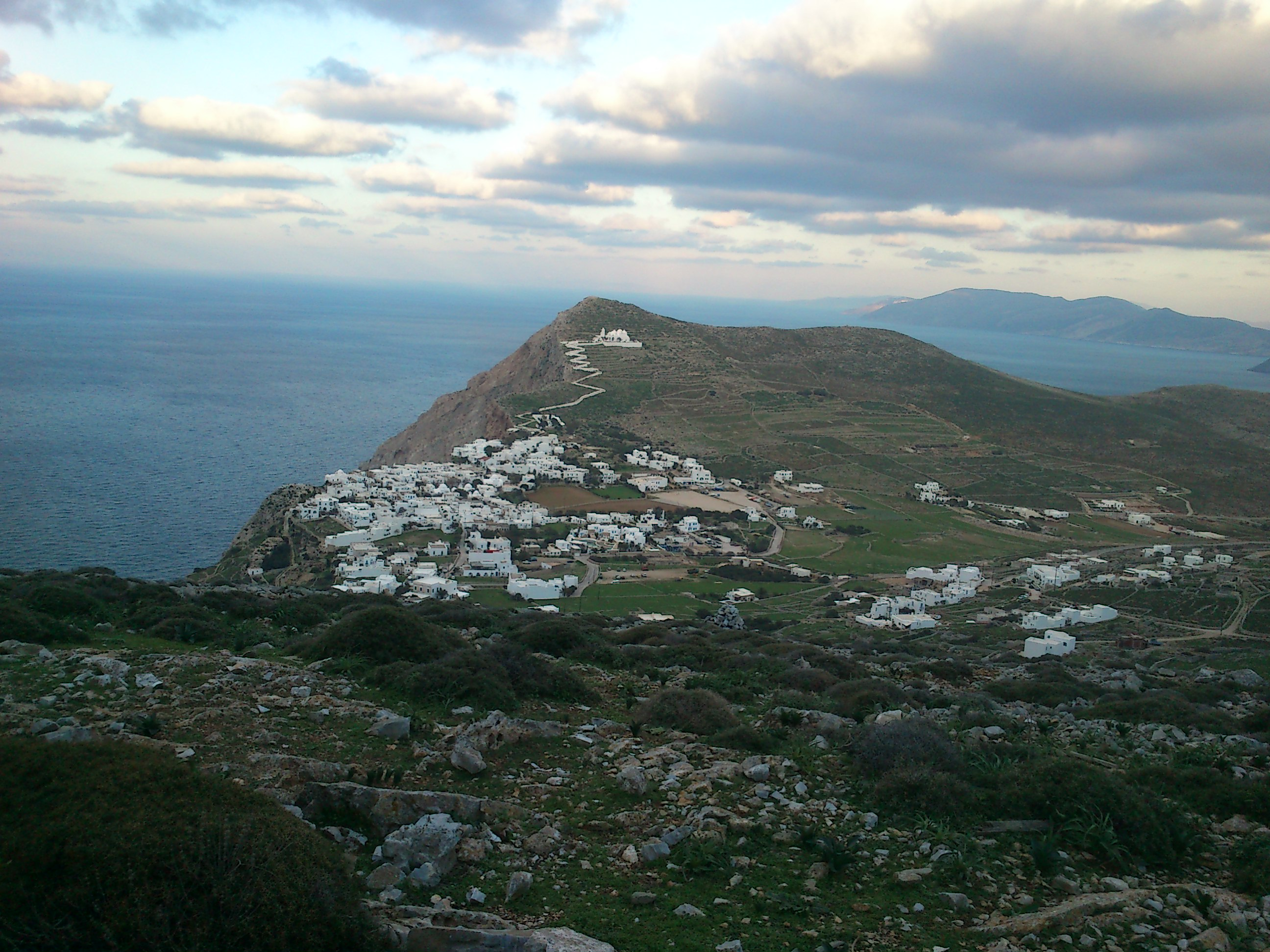
View of Chora

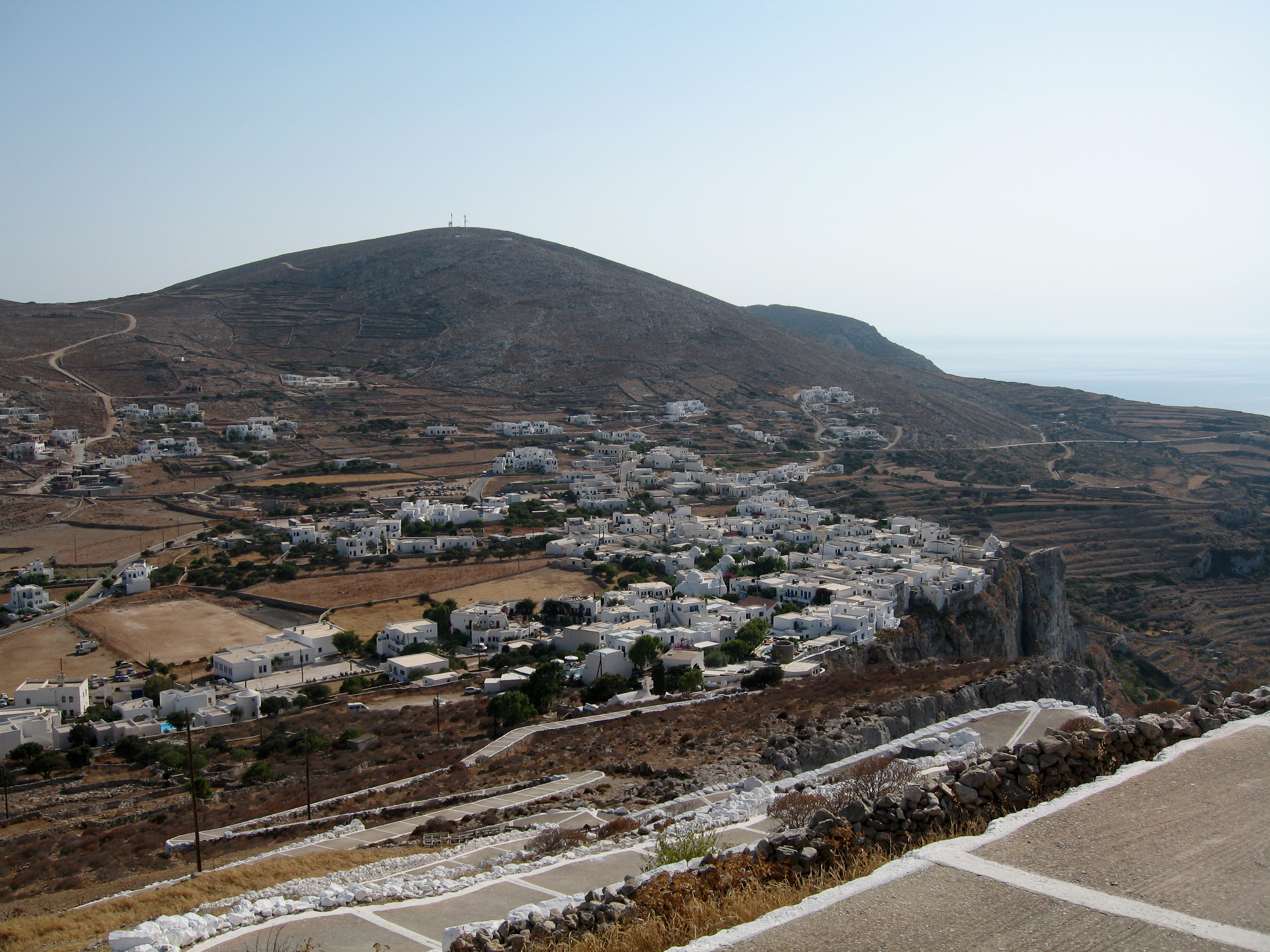
Chora seen from the church of Panagia

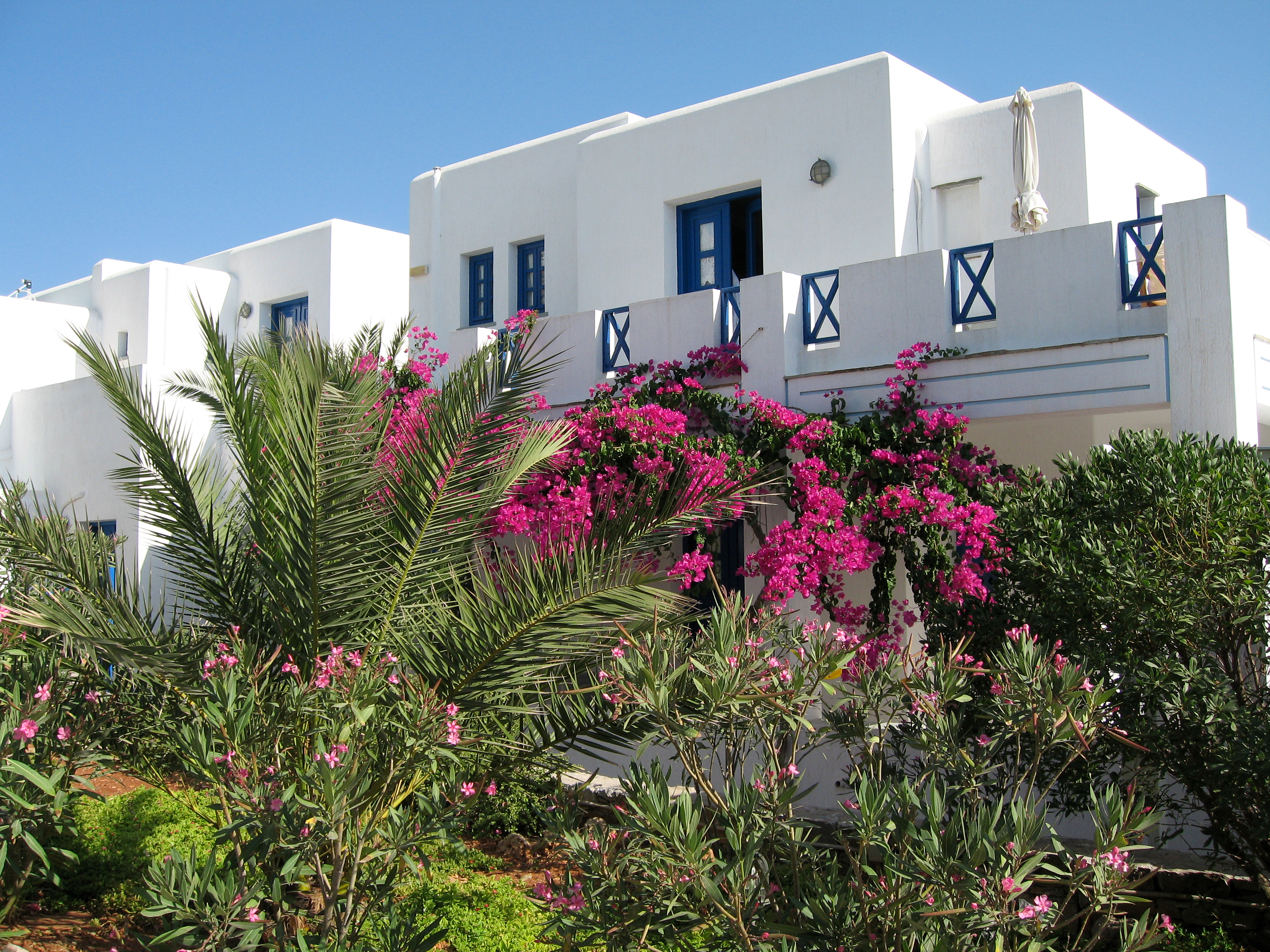
House of the island

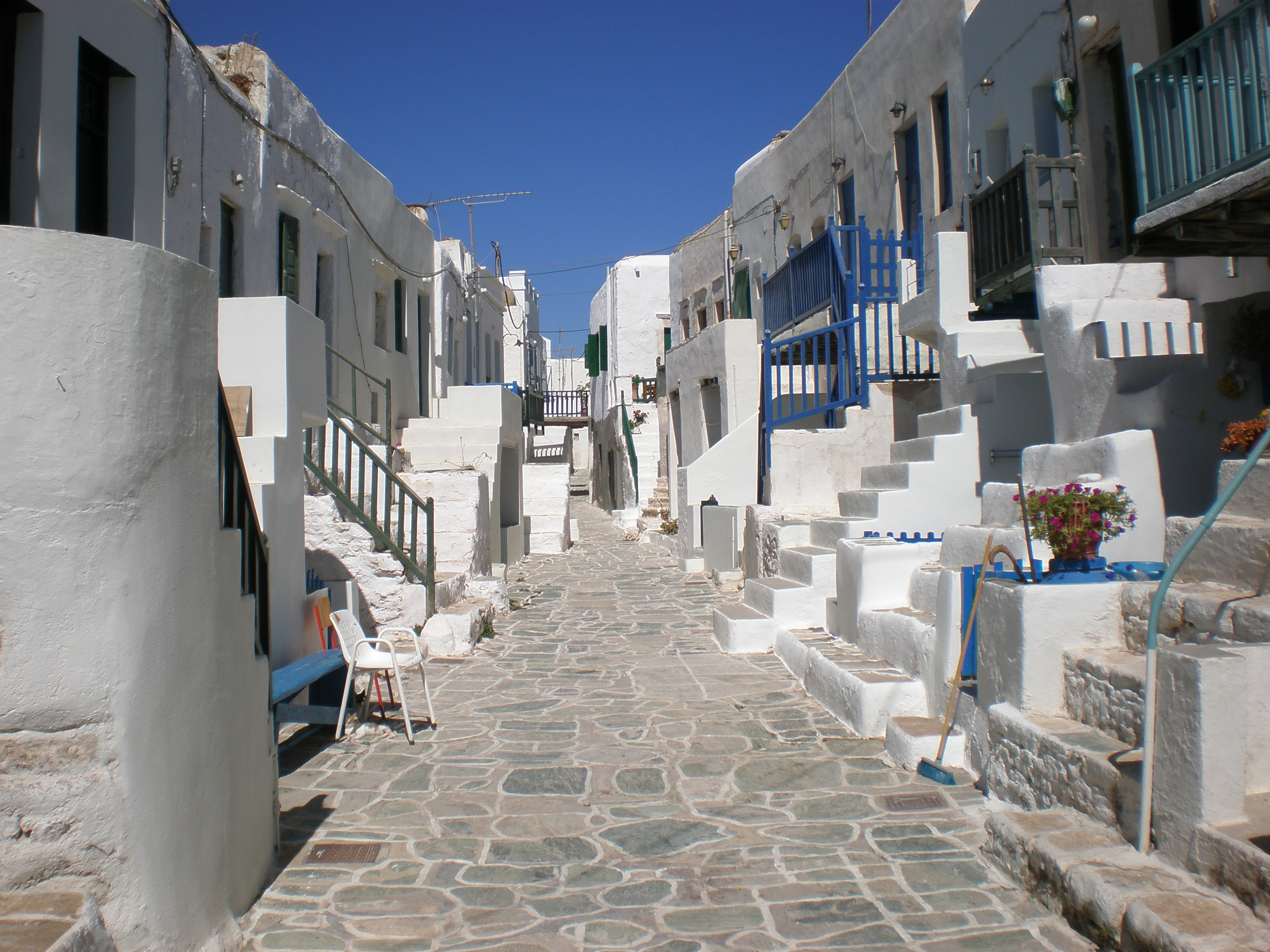
Inside the "Kastro" of Chora

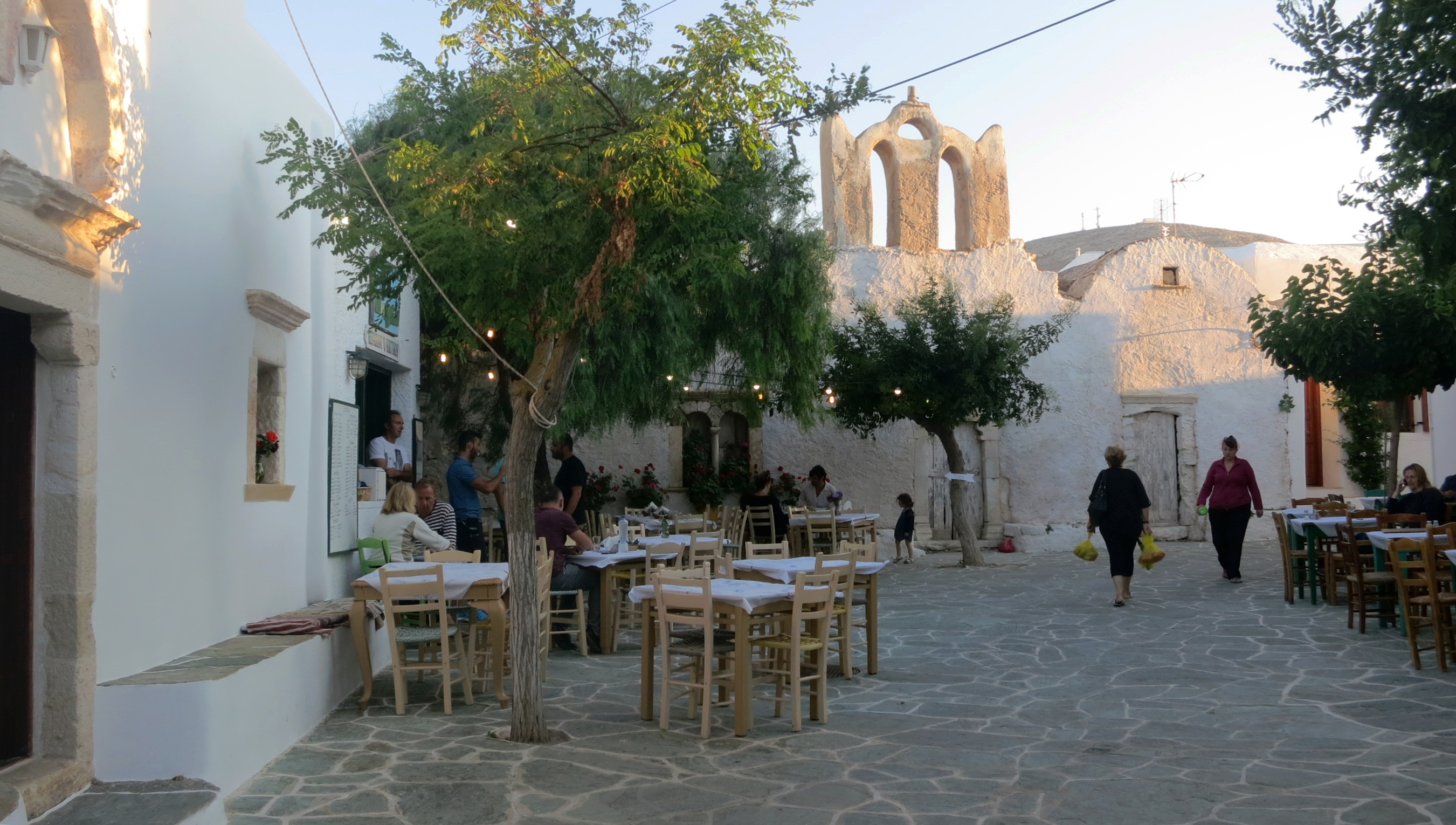
Chora

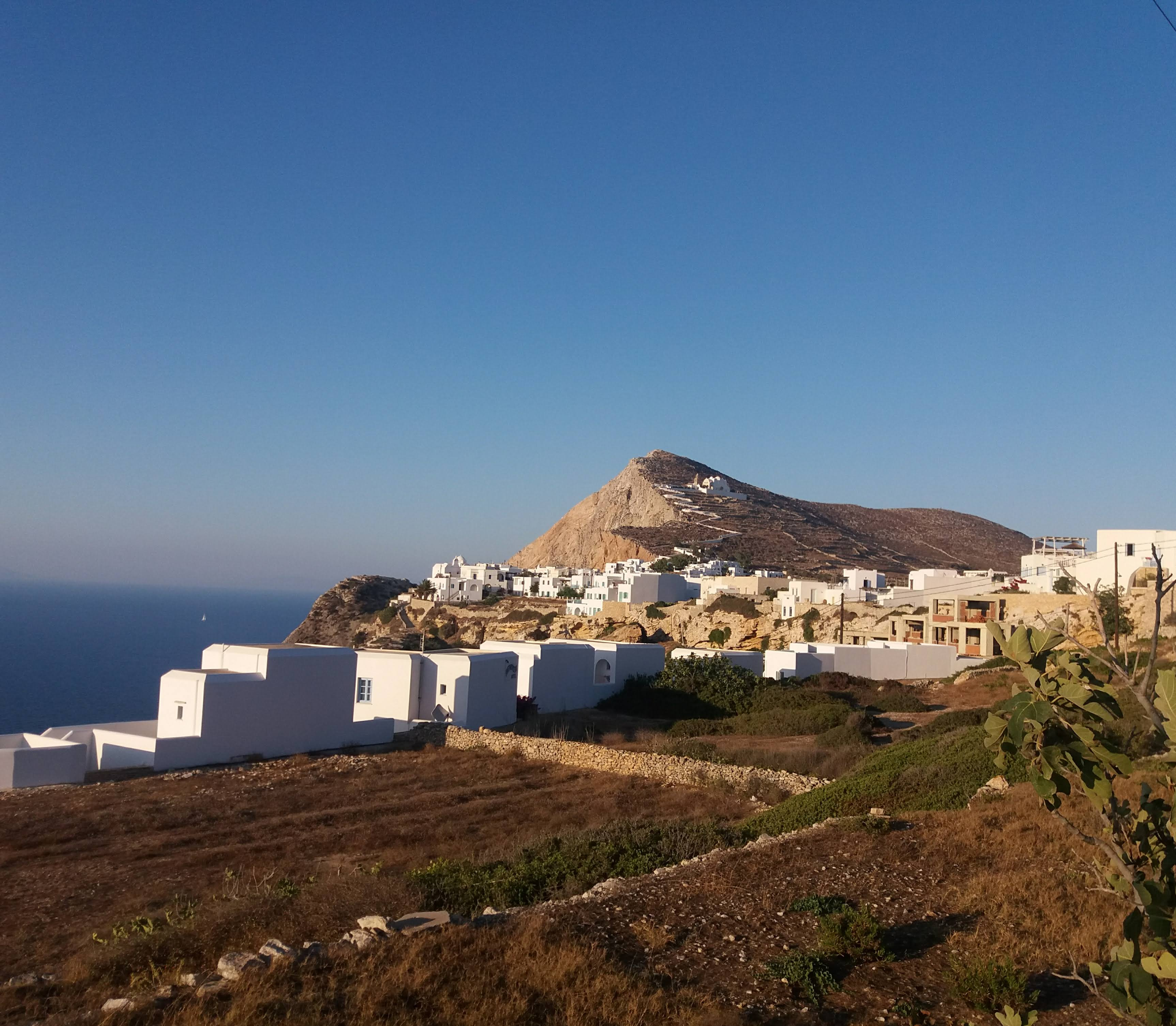
Chora & the church o Panagia to the north

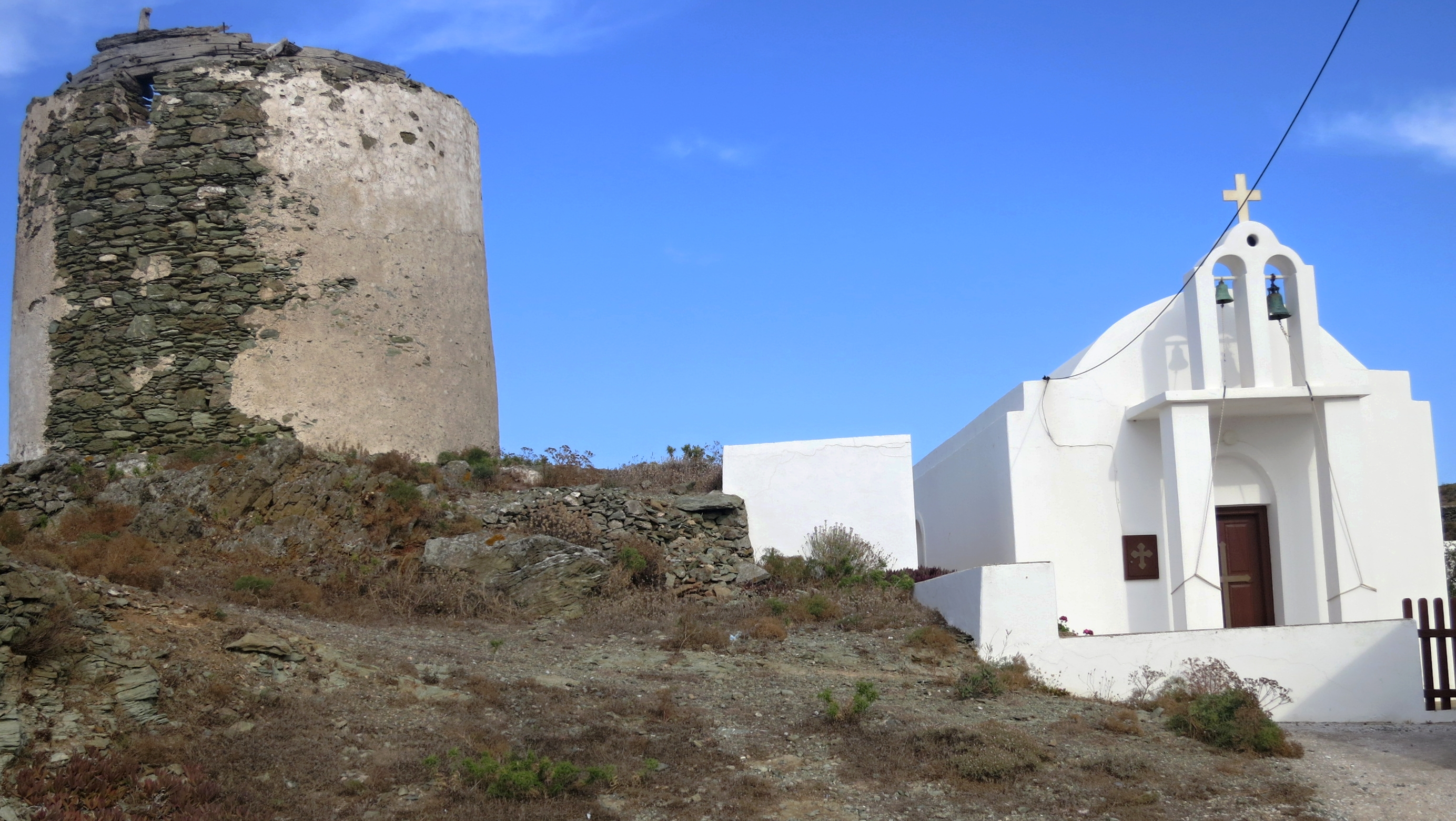
Ano Meria

== See also ==
- Thira (regional unit)
