= List of settlements in the Lefkada regional unit =

This is a list of settlements in the Lefkada regional unit, Greece.

- Agios Ilias
- Agios Nikitas
- Agios Petros
- Alexandros
- Apolpaina
- Asprogerakata
- Athani
- Charadiatika
- Chortata
- Dragano
- Drymonas
- Egklouvi
- Evgiros
- Exatheia
- Fterno
- Kalamitsi
- Kalamos
- Kariotes
- Karya
- Kastos
- Katochori
- Katomeri
- Katouna
- Kavallos
- Komili
- Kontaraina
- Lazarata
- Lefkada (city)
- Marantochori
- Neochori
- Nikolis
- Nydri
- Pigadisanoi
- Pinakochori
- Platystoma
- Poros
- Spanochori
- Spartochori
- Syvros
- Tsoukalades
- Vafkeri
- Vasiliki
- Vathy
- Vlycho
- Vournika

== See also ==
- List of towns and villages in Greece
