= Agios Nikitas =

Agios Nikitas Άγιος Νικήτας
- Community
- Location within Greece
- Coordinates: 38°47′N 20°37′E
- Country: Greece
- Administrative region: Ionian Islands
- Regional unit: Lefkada
- Municipality: Lefkada
- Municipal unit: Lefkada (city)

Population (2021)
  - Community: 63
- Time zone: UTC+2 (EET)
  - Summer (DST): UTC+3 (EEST)

Agios Nikitas (Greek: Άγιος Νικήτας) is a village on the island of Lefkada, Greece, part of the municipal unit of Lefkada. It is a small beach resort, situated on the northwestern coast, 4 km northwest of Karya and 10 km southwest of Lefkada city. The village has a church.

== Population ==
| Year | Population |
|---|---|
| 1981 | 69 |
| 1991 | 112 |
| 2001 | 66 |
| 2011 | 108 |
| 2021 | 63 |

== See also ==
- List of settlements in the Lefkada regional unit
