= Alexandros, Greece =

Alexandros Lefkada Αλέξανδρος Λευκάδας
- Community
- Location within Greece
- Coordinates: 38°45′N 20°43′E
- Country: Greece
- Administrative region: Ionian Islands
- Regional unit: Lefkada
- Municipality: Lefkada
- Municipal unit: Lefkada (city)

Population (2021)
  - Community: 750
- Time zone: UTC+2 (EET)
  - Summer (DST): UTC+3 (EEST)

Alexandros (Greek: Αλέξανδρος) is a village and a community of the municipal unit of Lefkada (city), Greece in the island of Lefkada. The community includes the villages Nikiana, Alexandros and Kollyvata. Nikiana is situated on the east coast of the island, 6 km east of Karya and 8 km south of Lefkada city.

== Population ==
Year	Village population	Community population
1981	-	550
1991	10	-
2001	11	668
2011	22	752
2021	19	750

== See also ==
- List of settlements in the Lefkada regional unit
