= Exanthia =

Exanthia Εξάνθεια
- Community
- Location within Greece
- Coordinates: 38°45′36″N 20°37′12″E
- Country: Greece
- Administrative region: Ionian Islands
- Regional unit: Lefkada
- Municipality: Lefkada

Area
  - Municipal unit: 0.15 km^{2} (0.058 sq mi)
- Highest elevation: 630 m (2,070 ft)
- Lowest elevation: 540 m (1,770 ft)

Population (2021)
  - Municipal unit: 163
  - Municipal unit density: 1,100/km^{2} (2,800/sq mi)
- Time zone: UTC+2 (EET)
  - Summer (DST): UTC+3 (EEST)
- Postal code: 310 80
- Area code: 26290
- Vehicle registration: EY

Exanthia (Greek: Εξάνθεια) is a small village on the island of Lefkada, Ionian Islands, Greece. According to the 2021 census, Exanthia had a population of 163. Until 2011 it was part of the municipal unit Sfakiotes, which has become defunct. It is now part of the unit Lefkada. Exanthia was the largest non-capital village in the old municipality as of 2001.

== Population ==
| Year | Population |
|---|---|
| 1981 | N/A |
| 1991 | N/A |
| 2001 | 374 |
| 2011 | N/A |
| 2021 | 163 |
