= Asprogerakata =

Asprogerakata Ασπρογερακάτα
- Community
- Location within Greece
- Coordinates: 38°47′59″N 20°39′11″E
- Country: Greece
- Administrative region: Ionian Islands
- Regional unit: Lefkada
- Municipality: Lefkada

Area
  - Municipal unit: 0.484 km^{2} (0.187 sq mi)

Population (2021)
  - Municipal unit: 79
  - Municipal unit density: 160/km^{2} (420/sq mi)
- Time zone: UTC+2 (EET)
  - Summer (DST): UTC+3 (EEST)
- Postal code: 310 80
- Area code: 26290
- Vehicle registration: EY

Asprogerakata (Greek: Ασπρογερακάτα) is a small village on the island of Lefkada, Ionian Islands, Greece. It is known for its big plane tree in Fryas Square. It is reported that it was planted in 1845 by Marino and Georgio Asprogerakas, and Christo Karfakis. Until 2011 it was part of the municipal unit Sfakiotes, which has become defunct. It is now part of the unit Lefkada. Asprogerakata was the smallest village in the old municipality as of 2001. It is roughly 7.3 km SW of Lefkada City, 1.4 km NW of Lazarata, 17.5 km NNE of Vasiliki. (As the crow flies.)

== Population ==
Year	Population
1981	98
1991	183
2001	102
2011	138
2021	79
