= Sfakiotes =

Sfakiotes Σφακιώτες
- Municipal unit
- Location within the regional unit

- Location within Greece
- Coordinates: 38°47′N 20°40′E
- Country: Greece
- Administrative region: Ionian Islands
- Regional unit: Lefkada
- Municipality: Lefkada
- Districts: 7

Area
  - Municipal unit: 30.494 km^{2} (11.774 sq mi)

Population (2021)
  - Municipal unit: 1,094
  - Municipal unit density: 35.88/km^{2} (92.92/sq mi)
- Time zone: UTC+2 (EET)
  - Summer (DST): UTC+3 (EEST)
- Postal code: 310 80
- Area code: 26290
- Vehicle registration: EY
- Website: www.sfakiotes.gr

Sfakiotes (Greek: Σφακιώτες) is a former municipality on the island of Lefkada, Ionian Islands, Greece. Since the 2011 local government reform it is part of the municipality Lefkada, of which it is a municipal unit. It is landlocked and located in the northern part of the island, just south of Lefkada. It has a land area of 30.494 km². The seat of the municipality was in the town of Lazarata. The municipal unit also features the Melissa gorge, one of the most beautiful points of interest on the island.

== Subdivisions ==
The municipal unit Sfakiotes is subdivided into the following communities:

- Asprogerakata
- Drymonas
- Exanthia
- Kavallos
- Lazarata
- Pinakochori
- Spanochori

== Twinnings ==
The town is twinned with:

- Leverano, Italy,

== Population ==
Year	Population
1991	1,873
2001	1,862
2011	1,377
2021	1,094

== See also ==
- List of settlements in the Lefkada regional unit
