= Drymonas =

Drymonas Δρυμώνας
- Community
- Location within Greece
- Coordinates: 38°46′15″N 20°37′39″E
- Country: Greece
- Administrative region: Ionian Islands
- Regional unit: Lefkada
- Municipality: Lefkada

Area
  - Municipal unit: 0.08 km^{2} (0.031 sq mi)
- Highest elevation: 560 m (1,840 ft)
- Lowest elevation: 490 m (1,610 ft)

Population (2021)
  - Municipal unit: 54
  - Municipal unit density: 670/km^{2} (1,700/sq mi)
- Time zone: UTC+2 (EET)
  - Summer (DST): UTC+3 (EEST)
- Postal code: 310 80
- Area code: 26290
- Vehicle registration: EY

Drymonas (Greek: Δρυμώνας) is a small village on the island of Lefkada, Ionian Islands, Greece. According to the 2021 census, Drymonas had a population of 54. Until 2011 it was part of the municipal unit Sfakiotes, which has become defunct. It is now part of the unit Lefkada. Drymonas was the 2nd smallest village in the old municipality as of 2001.

== Population ==
Year	Population
1981	N/A
1991	N/A
2001	159
2011	N/A
2021	54
