= Kalamos Island biological field station =

Kalamos island biological field Station
- Research Station
- Interactive map of Kalamos island biological field Station
- Coordinates: 38°37′26.9″N 20°55′46.2″E
- Country: Greece
- Administrative region: Ionian Islands
- Subdivision: Lefkada
- Administered by: Terra Sylvestris non governmental organization
- Founder: Terra Sylvestris non governmental organization
- Named for: Its location
- Time zone: UTC+2 (EET)
- Type: All year-round
- Period: Annual
- Status: Operational
- Facilities: Facilities include: Accommodation with dorm beds and shared bathrooms; Communal sitting areas; A range of amenities including laundry facilities; High speed wireless internet; Laboratories and offices; Library
- Website: www.terrasylvestris.org/biological-field-station

The Kalamos Island biological field station is a research station located in the island Kalamos, in the Ionian Sea, in Western Greece. It is situated in the core of the inner Ionian marine protected area, site GR22220003 of the Natura 2000 network. The marine area is additionally protected under the Agreement on the Conservation of Cetaceans of the Black Sea, Mediterranean Sea and contiguous Atlantic area (ACCOBAMS).

== Activities ==
The station is a base for year-round research activities in ecology, ecosystem management and sustainability issues such as permaculture. It was created as part of the Kalamos and Kastos sustainable development program of Terra Sylvestris, a non-governmental non profit organization that established the program in order to bring about sustainable development through rewilding in the area of the Island of Kalamos, Kastos and adjacent smaller islands and their marine environment.

The station conducts and facilitates a wide variety of research projects, ranging from biodiversity conservation to environmental justice to permaculture. The biological field station is also the base for the volunteer and internship programs of Terra Sylvestris, which enables people from all over the world to participate in the activities of Terra Sylvestris in the area and specifically the biological field station. The station is a member of the Organization of Biological Field Stations and the Global Ecovillage Network. The research station provides facilities for students as well as other visiting researchers and practitioners in the fields of ecology and biodiversity conservation to participate in or conduct projects in scientific research, ecosystem monitoring and ecosystem management.

== Gallery ==
Overview of Kalamos island biological field Station facilities.

The Kalamos Island pine forest, an internationally important area for birds, in the background, with the edge of the inner Ionian marine protected area waters in the foreground.
