= Pinakochori =

Pinakochori Πινακοχώρι
- Community
- Location within Greece
- Coordinates: 38°46′28″N 20°39′38″E
- Country: Greece
- Administrative region: Ionian Islands
- Regional unit: Lefkada
- Municipality: Lefkada

Area
  - Municipal unit: 0.16 km^{2} (0.062 sq mi)
- Highest elevation: 480 m (1,570 ft)
- Lowest elevation: 380 m (1,250 ft)

Population (2021)
  - Municipal unit: 293
  - Municipal unit density: 1,800/km^{2} (4,700/sq mi)
- Time zone: UTC+2 (EET)
  - Summer (DST): UTC+3 (EEST)
- Postal code: 310 80
- Area code: 26290
- Vehicle registration: EY

Pinakochori (Greek: Πινακοχώρι) is a small village on the island of Lefkada, Ionian Islands, Greece. According to the 2021 census, Pinakochori had a population of 293. Until 2011 it was part of the municipal unit Sfakiotes, which has become defunct. It is now part of the unit Lefkada. Pinakochori was the 4th largest village in the old municipality as of 2001.

== Population ==
Year	Population
1981	N/A
1991	N/A
2001	247
2011	N/A
2021	293
