= Lazarata =

Lazarata Λαζαράτα
- Community
- Location within Greece
- Coordinates: 38°47′N 20°40′E
- Country: Greece
- Administrative region: Ionian Islands
- Regional unit: Lefkada
- Municipality: Lefkada
- Municipal unit: Sfakiotes

Population (2021)
  - Community: 332
- Time zone: UTC+2 (EET)
  - Summer (DST): UTC+3 (EEST)

Lazarata (Greek: Λαζαράτα), is a village in the northern part of the island of Lefkada, Greece. It was the seat of the former municipality of Sfakiotes. Lazarata is located 7 km southwest of the main town of Lefkada and 3 km northeast of Karya.

== Population ==
Year	Population
1961	444
1991	453
2001	454
2011	526
2021	332
