= Spanochori =

Spanochori Σπανοχώρι
- Community
- Location within Greece
- Coordinates: 38°46′49″N 20°40′15″E
- Country: Greece
- Administrative region: Ionian Islands
- Regional unit: Lefkada
- Municipality: Lefkada

Area
  - Municipal unit: 0.13 km^{2} (0.050 sq mi)
- Highest elevation: 460 m (1,510 ft)
- Lowest elevation: 390 m (1,280 ft)

Population (2021)
  - Municipal unit: 124
  - Municipal unit density: 950/km^{2} (2,500/sq mi)
- Time zone: UTC+2 (EET)
  - Summer (DST): UTC+3 (EEST)
- Postal code: 310 80
- Area code: 26290
- Vehicle registration: EY

Spanochori (Greek: Σπανοχώρι) is a small village on the island of Lefkada, Ionian Islands, Greece. According to the 2021 census, Spanochori had a population of 124. Until 2011 it was part of the municipal unit Sfakiotes, which has become defunct. It is now part of the unit Lefkada. Spanochori was the 3rd smallest village in the old municipality as of 2001.

== Population ==
Year	Population
1981	N/A
1991	N/A
2001	219
2011	N/A
2021	124
