= Porto Leone =

Porto Leone may refer to:

- A former name of the port and town of Piraeus, Athens, Greece
- A former village on the island of Kalamos (island), Greece
