= Kary (name) =

Kary is both a surname and a given name. Notable people with the name include:

Surname:

- Douglas Kary, Republican member of the Montana Legislature
- Hans Kary (born 1949), former Austrian professional tennis player

Given name:

- Kary Antholis, American executive at the television network HBO
- Kary Arora (born 1977), the first female professional DJ in Delhi, India
- Kary H Lasch (1914–1993), Swedish photographer
- Kary Mullis (1944–2019), a Nobel Prize–winning American biochemist, author, and lecturer
- Kary Ng (born 1986), a pop rock singer in Hong Kong
- Kary Osmond, Canadian television chef
- Kary Vincent (born 1969), American football player
- Kary Vincent Jr. (born 1999), American football player

== See also ==
- Kary (disambiguation)
- Karey (disambiguation)
- Karly
- Karyl
