= Karya =

Karya may refer to:

- Karya (Arcadia), a town of ancient Arcadia, Greece
- Karya Köse (born 1997), Turkish female water polo player
- Karya, Larissa, a municipal unit in Larissa regional unit, Greece
- Karya, Lefkada, a municipal unit on Lefkada island, Greece
- Kārya, cause and effect in Advaita Vedanta

== See also ==
- Karyl
