= Kastos =

Greek island in the Ionian Sea

Kastos Καστός
- Municipal unit
- Location within the regional unit

- Location within Greece
- Coordinates: 38°34′N 20°55′E
- Country: Greece
- Administrative region: Ionian Islands
- Regional unit: Lefkada
- Municipality: Lefkada

Area
  - Municipal unit: 5.901 km^{2} (2.278 sq mi)
- Highest elevation: 142 m (466 ft)
- Lowest elevation: 0 m (0 ft)

Population (2021)
  - Municipal unit: 40
  - Municipal unit density: 6.8/km^{2} (18/sq mi)
- Time zone: UTC+2 (EET)
  - Summer (DST): UTC+3 (EEST)
- Postal code: 300 19
- Area code: 26460
- Vehicle registration: EY

Kastos (Greek: Καστός) is a Greek island and a former community east of the island of Lefkada, Ionian Islands, Greece. Since the 2011 local government reform it is part of the municipality Lefkada, of which it is a municipal unit. Until 1974, when it became part of the Lefkada Prefecture, the island was administered under the Cephalonia Prefecture (Ithaca province). The nearest island is Kalamos, with a deep channel between them; the mainland is approximately 5 kilometres (3 miles) to the northeast in Aetolia-Acarnania.

== Geography ==
The island has only one village, the homonymous Kastos, located on its east coast. It has a population of about 40, involved mainly in tourism services, as well as fishing. During the summer Kastioti of the diaspora return for holidays and together with the fluctuating visitors arriving on yachts, form its seasonal character. The island is 7 km (4 mi) long from north to south, and 800 m wide. The area is 5.901 square kilometres (2.278 sq mi) and its highest point is 142 metres (466 feet) over the Mediterranean Sea level. Kastos has two churches, Agios Ioannis Prodromos, which is located in the centre of the village, and Agios Emilianos, located about 4 km (2 mi) northeastern of the village. Agios Ioannis church is decorated with wall paintings from the notable Eptanesian painter Spyridon Gazis. Also, the island has two windmills and three olive presses, none of them functioning anymore.

== Population ==
Year	Island population
1981	68
1991	50
2001	120
2011	80
2021	40

== Facilities ==
The island has a range of facilities such as a mini-market, three bars, four restaurants and a small gift shop. All facilities are open during the summer, however most close during the winter months of the island. The island has two harbours for boat mooring, one located on the front of the island, the other located at the back, in a bay called Sarakiniko.

== Politics ==
Parliamentary election results since 2000
6/2023	5/2023	2019	9/2015	1/2015	6/2012
1. ND 36.84%; 2. SYRIZA 21.05%; 3. PASOK 7.89%; 4. KKE 7.89%; 5. Spartans 7.89%; 6. EL 5.26%; 7. MERA25 5.26%; 8. PE 2.63%; 9. PS 2.63%; 10. FL 2.63%	1. ND 48.57%; 2. SYRIZA 17.14%; 3. MERA25 11.43%; 4. PASOK 5.71%; 5. KKE 5.71%; 6. PE 5.71%; 7. EL 2.86%; 8. EAN 2.86%	1. ND 58.33%; 2. SYRIZA 21.67%; 3. PASOK 8.33%; 4. EL 6.67%; 5. PE 3.33%; 6. KKE 1.67%	1. SYRIZA 45.95%; 2. ND 16.22%; 3. XA 16.22%; 4. EK 8.11%; 5. KKE 5.41%; 6. PASOK 2.70%; 7. LAE 2.70%; 8. ANTARSYA 2.70%	1. SYRIZA 67.86%; 2. ND 10.71%; 3. PASOK 7.14%; 4. XA 3.57%; 5. River 3.57%; 6. ANEL 3.57%; 7. KIDISO 3.57%	1. SYRIZA 39.39%; 2. ND 21.21%; 3. PASOK 13.64%; 4. XA 13.64%; 5. DIMAR 9.09%; 6. ANEL 1.52%; 7. KKE M-L–M-L KKE 1.52%
5/2012	2009	2007	2004	2000	
1. SYRIZA 24.56%; 2. PASOK 19.30%; 3. XA 19.30%; 4. ND 10.53%; 5. KKE 7.02%; 6. DIMAR 5.26%; 7. KOISY 5.26%; 8. DIMAN-EPAM 5.26%; 9. ANEL 1.75%; 10. ANTARSYA 1.75%	1. PASOK 51.19%; 2. ND 34.52%; 3. KKE 10.71%; 4. LAOS 1.19%; 5. OP 1.19%; 6. DIMAN 1.19%	1. PASOK 51.02%; 2. ND 34.69%; 3. KKE 8.16%; 4. SYRIZA 4.08%; 5. LAOS 1.02%; 6. M-L KKE 1.02%	1. PASOK 39.76%; 2. ND 37.35%; 3. DIKKI 8.43%; 4. KKE 6.02%; 5. SYRIZA 6.02%; 6. LAOS 2.41%	1. PASOK 50.00%; 2. ND 39.19%; 3. KKE 6.76%; 4. Coalition 2.70%; 5. DIKKI 1.35%	

European Parliament election results since 1999
2024	2019	2014	2009	2004	1999
1. MERA25 22.22%; 2. KKE 18.52%; 3. ND 14.81%; 4. PASOK 11.11%; 5. SYRIZA 7.41%; 6. FL 7.41%; 7. Democrats 7.41%; 8. EL 3.70%; 9. PE 3.70%; 10. NA 3.70%	1. SYRIZA 28.33%; 2. ND 25.00%; 3. XA 10.00%; 4. AD 10.00%; 5. EL 8.33%; 6. KKE 3.33%; 7. PASOK 1.67%; 8. LAOS 1.67%; 9. EP 1.67%; 10. ANTARSYA 1.67%; 11. AKKEL 1.67%; 12. ENYPEKK 1.67%; 13. DE 1.67%; 14. EM 1.67%; 15. Rainbow 1.67%	1. SYRIZA 40.68%; 2. XA 16.95%; 3. PASOK 11.86%; 4. ANTARSYA 10.17%; 5. KKE 3.39%; 6. LAOS 3.39%; 7. EPAM 3.39%; 8. LEYKO 3.39%; 9. ND 1.69%; 10. ANEL 1.69%; 11. EPAL 1.69%; 12. KEAN 1.69%	1. PASOK 51.11%; 2. ND 17.78%; 3. KKE 15.56%; 4. LAOS 8.89%; 5. SYRIZA 4.44%; 6. EO 2.22%	1. ND 47.46%; 2. PASOK 30.51%; 3. KKE 11.86%; 4. Coalition 5.08%; 5. OP 3.39%; 6. LAOS 1.69%	1. PASOK 38.60%; 2. DIKKI 24.56%; 3. ND 15.79%; 4. KKE 10.53%; 5. Coalition 3.51%; 6. RAK 3.51%; 7. Liberals 1.75%; 8. MERA 1.75%

== See also ==
- List of settlements in the Lefkada regional unit
