= Kary =

Kary may refer to:

- Kary (name), is both a surname and a given name
- Kary, South Dakota, a ghost town
- KARY-FM, a radio station in Grandview, Washington, United States
- Kary, the fire fiend in the video game Final Fantasy
- K-ary, referring to arity in mathematics and computer science
- Kary, another name for the Malagasy forest cat

== See also ==
- Cary (disambiguation)
- Karey (disambiguation)
