= KAYL =

KAYL may refer to:

- KAYL (AM), a radio station (990 AM) licensed to Storm Lake, Iowa, United States
- KAYL-FM, a radio station (101.7 FM) licensed to Storm Lake, Iowa, United States

== See also ==
- Kayl, a town in Luxembourg
- Karyl
