= Kryl =

Kryl may refer to:

- Kryl, Lubusz Voivodeship, a settlement in Western Poland
- Bohumir (Bohumír) Kryl, Czech-American Concert band leader and top cornet soloist.
- Karel Kryl, a Czech songwriter known for his criticism of the Communist regime

== See also ==
- Karyl
