= Panos G. Rontoyannis =

Panos G. Rontoyannis (Alternate spelling Rontogannis Greek: Πάνος Γ. Ροντογιάννης; June 20, 1911 in Lefkas – December 26, 1996 in Athens) was a philologist-historian of Lefkas.

== Main works ==
- History of the Island of Lefkas, Vol 1 (1980), Vol 2 (1982)
- Education in Lefkas 1613-1950 (1994)
- The Lefkadian Population from the Remote Past to 1991 (1994)
- Seismologio of Lefkas 1469-1971 (1994)
- Founder of the Public Library and the Museum of Post-byzantine Ecclesiastic Art of Lefkas (1953-1965)
- Founder of the Association for Lefkadian Studies (1949)
