= Karyl =

Karyl is a given name that is a variant of Carol.

- Karyl Ross Harris, fullname of Ken Harris (1898 – 1982), American animator
- Karyl McBride American author and psychotherapist
- Karyl Geld Miller, American screenwriter, political cartoonist and commentator
- Karyl Norman stagename of George Francis Peduzzi (1897 – 1947), American female impersonator

== See also ==
- Karel (given name)
- Karl (given name)
- Karol (name)
- Kary (name)
- Karya (disambiguation)
- KAYL (disambiguation)
- Kryl (disambiguation)
