= Egremni =

Remote beach on the coast of the Ionian island of Lefkada, Greece

Coordinates: 38°36′09″N 20°32′58″E

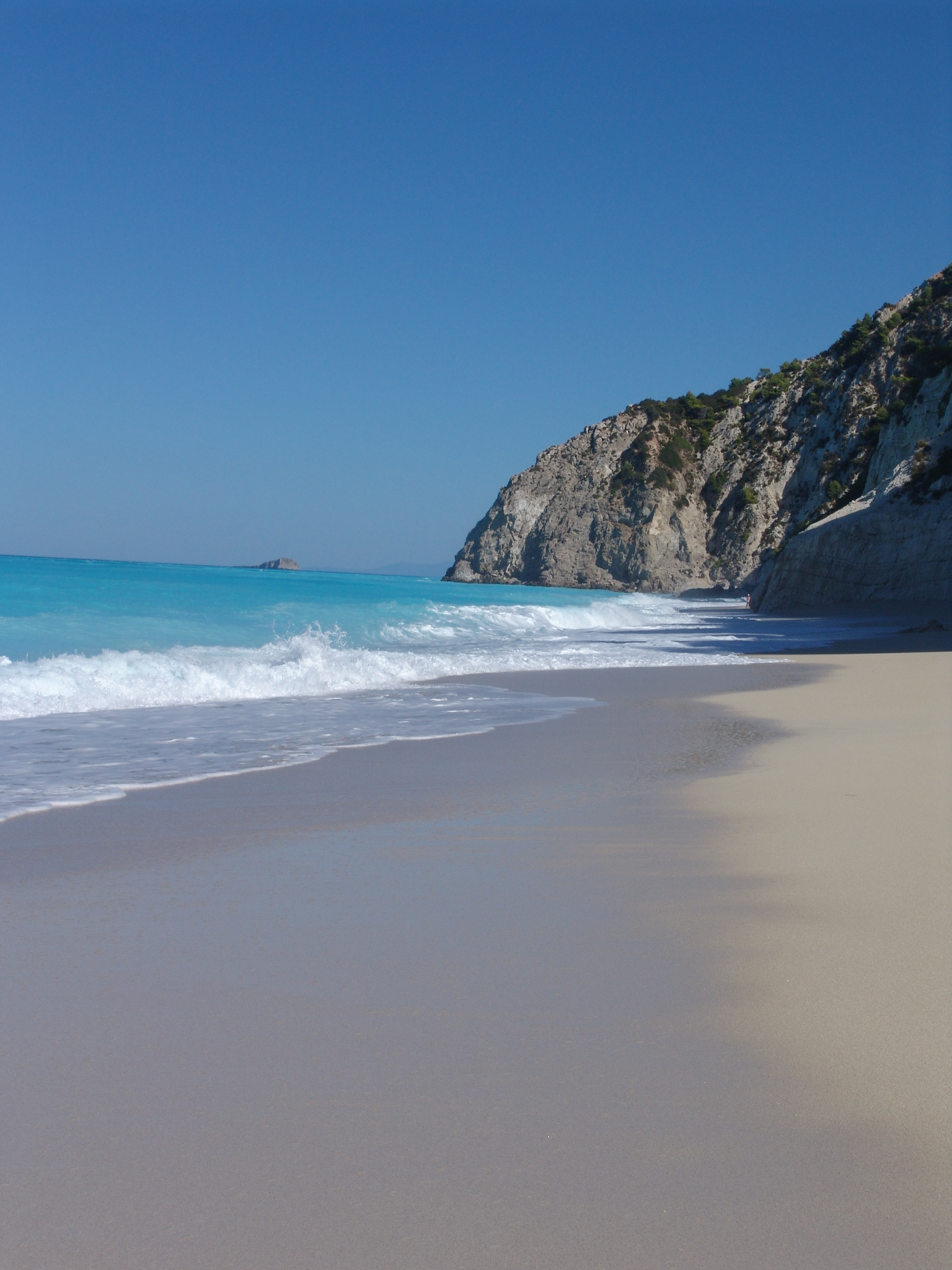
Egremni. Shannon Davis 2006

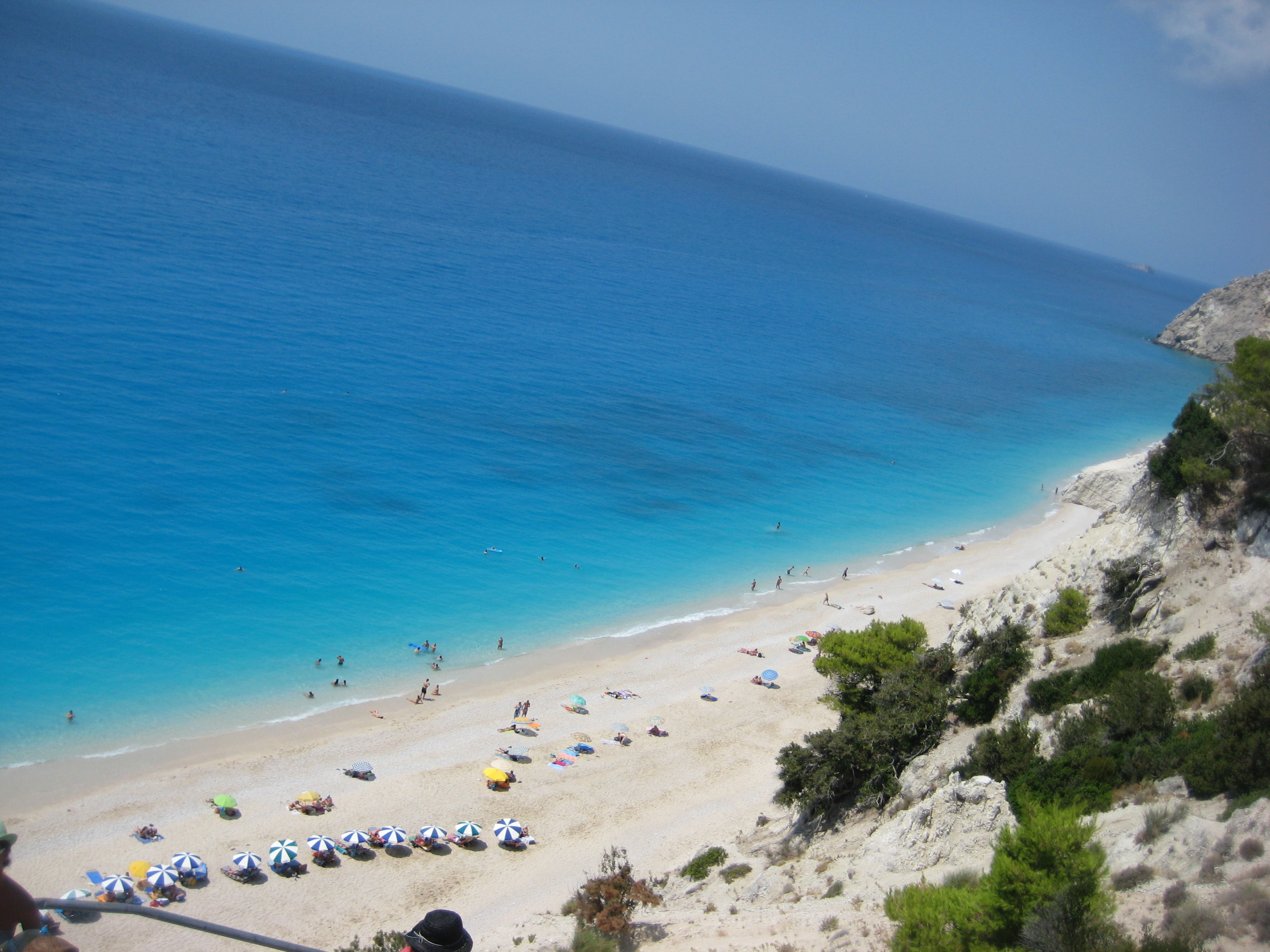
View from the stairs.

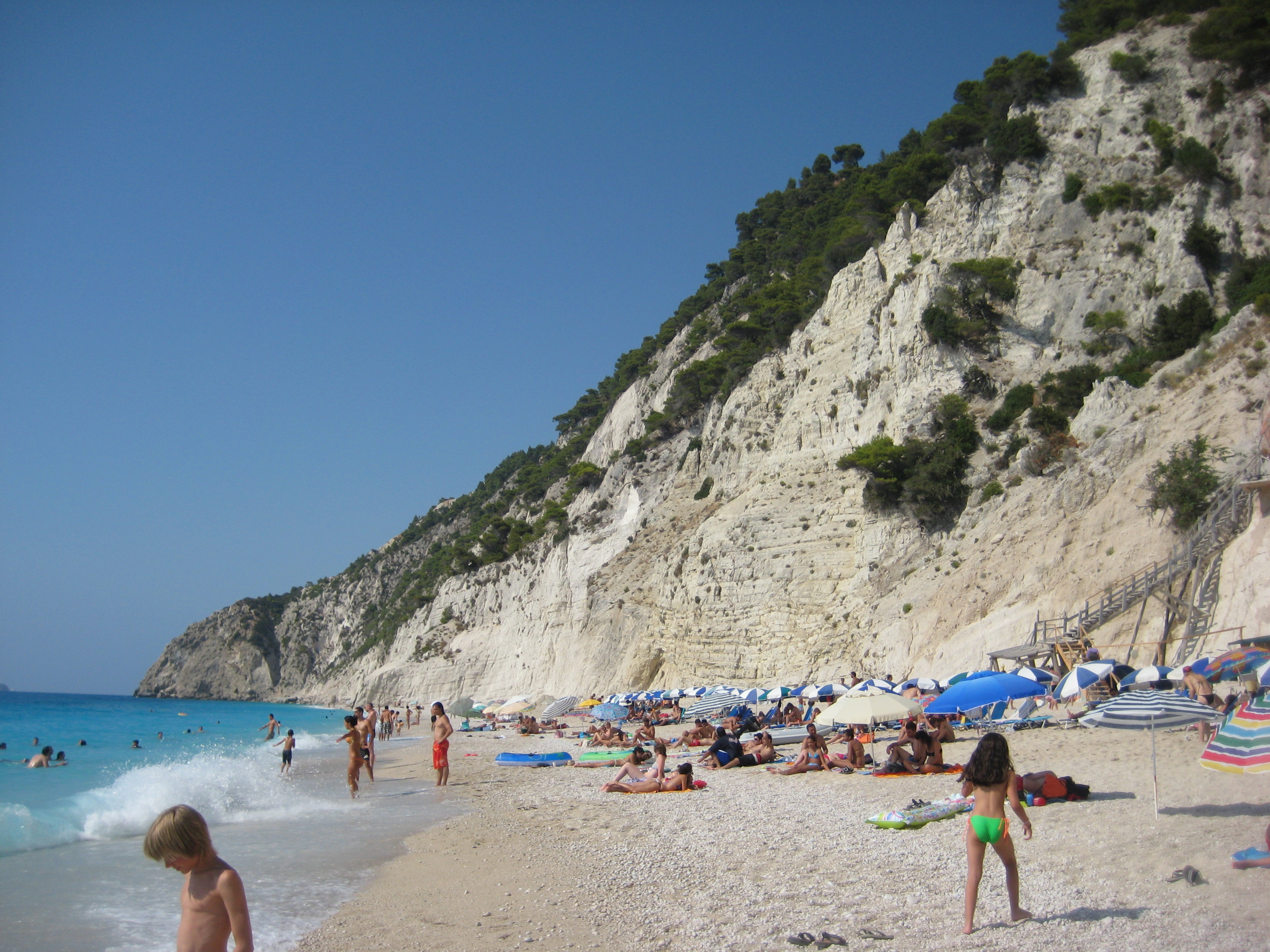
In the right, you can see the stair which is the end of the (consisted of 347 steep steps) path on the mountain

Egremni or Egremnoi (Greek: Εγκρεμνή or Εγκρεμνοί) is a remote beach located on the south-western coast of the Ionian island of Lefkada, north-western Greece. Since the creation of a sealed road during the mid-1990s, this remote beach has become one of the premier tourist destinations on the island, and in Europe as a whole.

The waters of Egremni are clear.

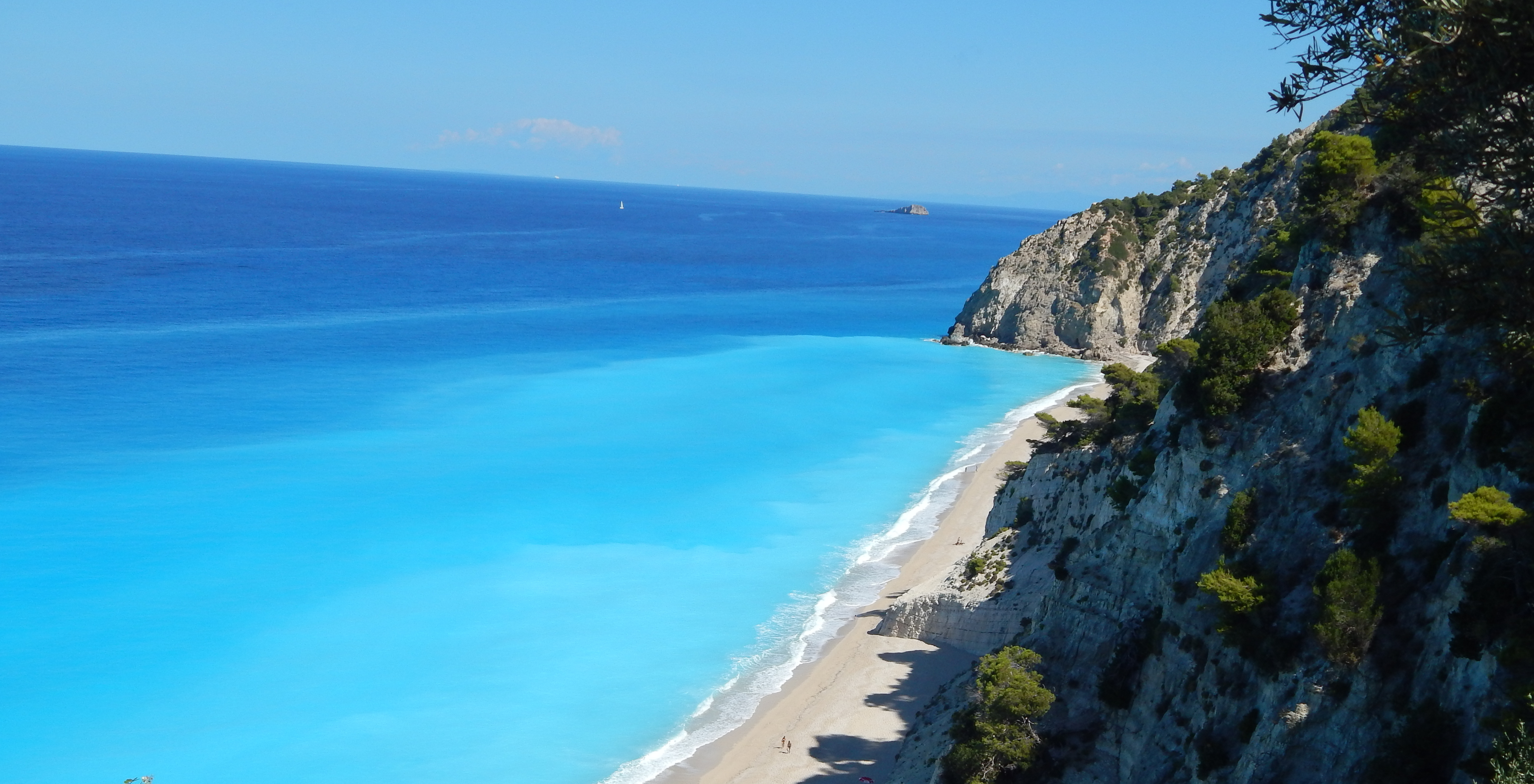
Panoramic view of the beach.

Following the deadly earthquake that struck the island on Tuesday, November 17th 2015 which killed two elderly women, the entire landscape of the area changed, leaving much of the area which once occupied sunbathers and beach towels, covered in rubble.

The Egremnoi beach, according to Travel + Leisure, is one of the "13 Places Where You Can See the Bluest Water in the World".
