= Kary H Lasch =

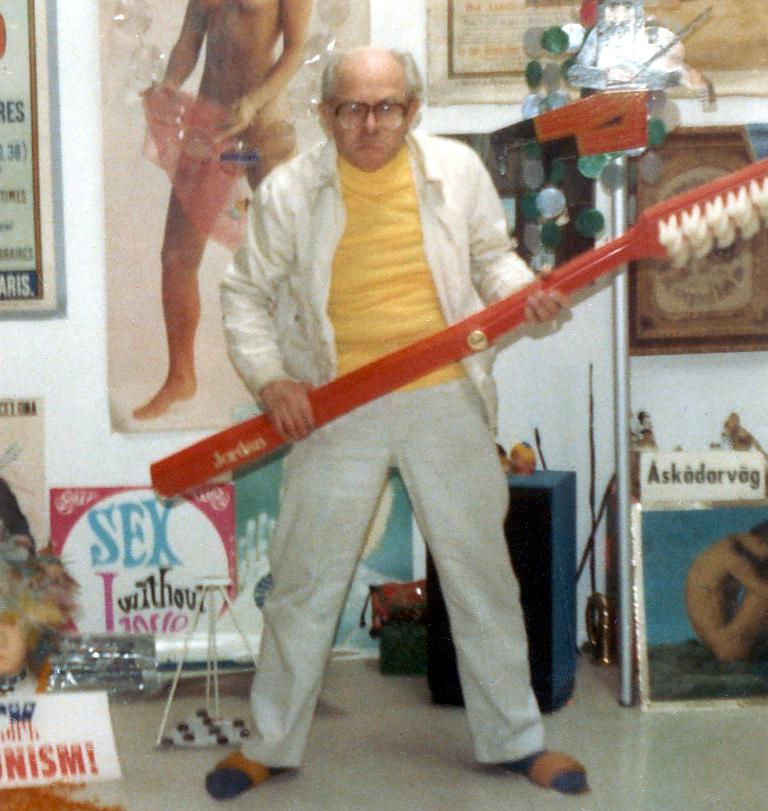
Kary Lasch in the hall of his penthouse studio in 1978.

Kary H. Lasch (1914 – 1993) born Kary Hermann Arthur Wilhelm Lasch on 1 February 1914 in Prague, Austria-Hungary died 27 August 1993 in Danderyd, Sweden) was a photographer who based his international model scouting network in Stockholm. He is known for his photographs of famous people like Pablo Picasso, Salvador Dalí, Federico Fellini, Sofia Loren, and Brigitte Bardot. Kary Lasch visited the Cannes Film Festival consecutively for thirty years. He also did covers for major international magazines like EPOCA of Italy, Popular Photography and many others. His humorous pictures are plentiful but less known.

== Photography ==
As a photographer, Kary H. Lasch was mainly known as a model photographer. He was famous for delivering models and starlets to the world's publications, fashion, and film industries. Few are aware of his profession's wide range and scope: fashion, racing cars, bullfighting, art, travel, and industrial photography, to mention just a few. He loved to travel and could be on the road for eight to 10 months yearly. He traveled impulsively wherever his nose pointed: "I have not been to South America, or maybe Nepal is better." He traveled worldwide using business cards on which the Lufthansa boss had written, "Help Kary H. Lasch with everything he needs." Photography was a tool for meeting people; he carried four address books full of telephone numbers and places. He appeared in ads for Hasselblad as a master photographer and had his pictures on the cover of large magazines worldwide. Lennart Nilsson, Sune Jonsson, and Kary Lasch performed workshops together and traveled around the country for many years in Sweden. "C'est un artiste! Un maître!" Pablo Picasso replied, after he had seen Lasch's images of bullfighting.

== Family ==
Lasch was apparently a photobomber in his early age. In the 1920s, in the light of French photographer Jacques Henri Lartigue and "La Belle Époque" a high standard of living, and the Industrial Revolution, his family apparently adopted all the ingredients. They lived in Prague and had a mansion in Kutná Hora (Kuttenberg) with a tiny railroad in their garden that led to the music pavilion where they entertained the socialites. Max Lasch, Kary's father, and his Austrian wife Margarethe and family were wealthy until 1938, when the Germans invaded and ended the First Czechoslovak Republic. Lasch became stateless without a passport in 1938 and had to stay in Sweden, where he had to create various jobs to survive.
