= Kary, South Dakota =

Coordinates: 43°25′04″N 101°05′14″W

Kary is a ghost town in Mellette County, in the U.S. state of South Dakota.

== History ==
A post office called Kary was established in 1925, and remained in operation until 1946. The town has the name of a local family.
