= Kalamos (island) =

Greek island in the Aegean Sea

Kalamos Κάλαμος
- Municipal unit
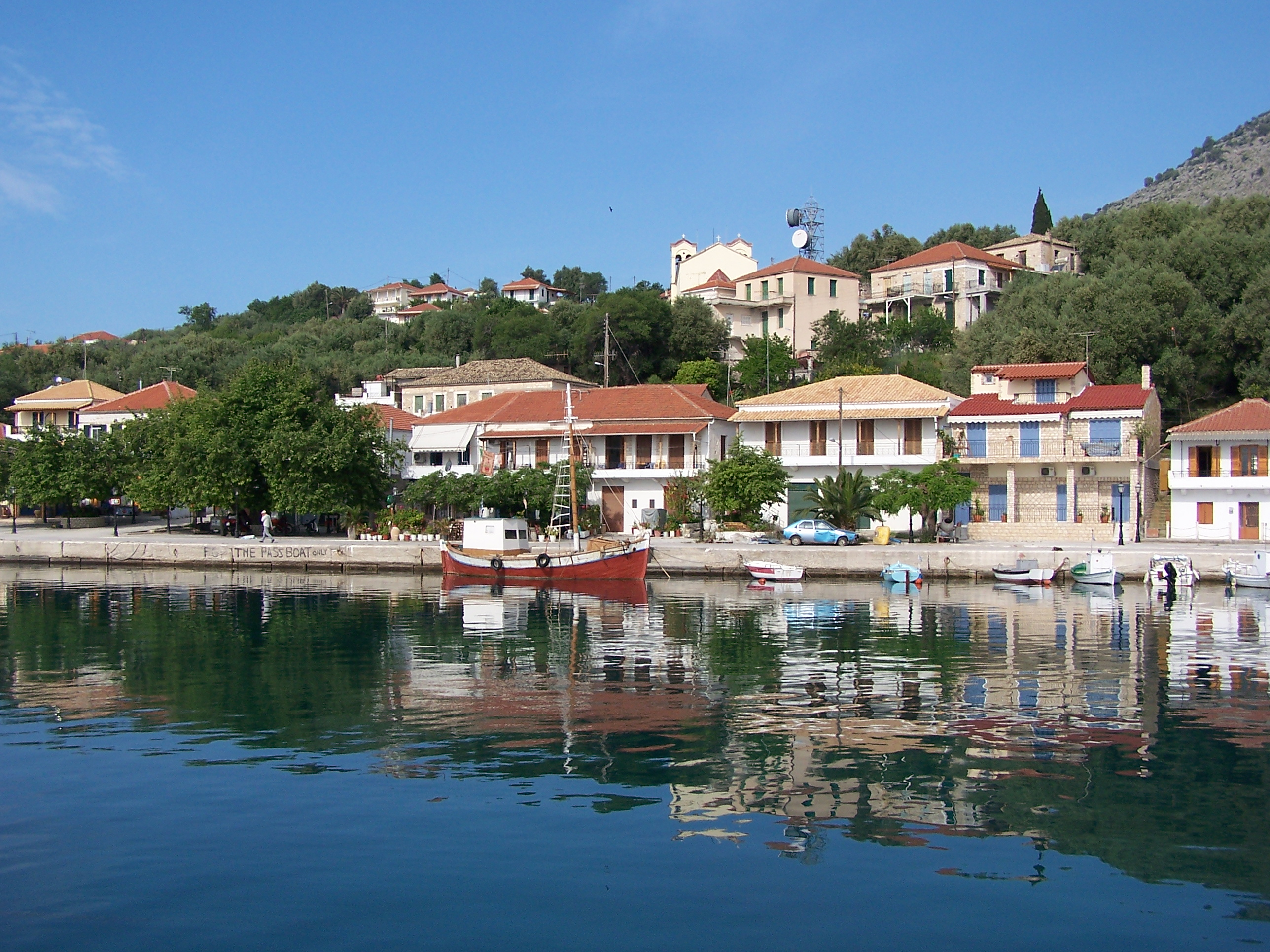
- Kalamos

- Location within the regional unit

- Location within Greece
- Coordinates: 38°37′N 20°55′E
- Country: Greece
- Administrative region: Ionian Islands
- Regional unit: Lefkada
- Municipality: Lefkada

Area
  - Municipal unit: 24.964 km^{2} (9.639 sq mi)
- Highest elevation: 754 m (2,474 ft)
- Lowest elevation: 0 m (0 ft)

Population (2021)
  - Municipal unit: 342
  - Municipal unit density: 13.7/km^{2} (35.5/sq mi)
- Time zone: UTC+2 (EET)
  - Summer (DST): UTC+3 (EEST)
- Postal code: 310 80
- Area code: 26290
- Vehicle registration: EY

Kalamos (Greek: Κάλαμος, known in antiquity as Κάρνος – Karnos) is a mountainous island and a former community in the Ionian Islands, Greece. Since the 2011 local government reform it is part of the municipality Lefkada, of which it is a municipal unit. It lies east of Lefkada, near the Greek mainland. It has a wintering population of around 500 people, which is swelled substantially in the summer by tourists.

The name Kalamos means reed in Greek and the presence of this plant along its coastline in the past may have given its name. Another version is that the island had several beaches with good sand (Kali Ammos in Greek) hence the name given. The land area is 24.964 km^{2} (9.639 sq mi), and its highest point is 754 m (2,474 ft) above sea level.

The main settlement on the island is the port town of Kalamos (pop. 454) on the east coast of the island. A regular ferry service connects the island to Mytikas on the mainland. Episkopi (pop. 42) is the only other inhabited village on the island along with Kastro. The village of Kefali, also known by its Venetian name Porto Leone, was abandoned following the 1953 Ionian earthquake. The main church is still in use and still houses the sacred image of the virgin Mary that is also considered a miracle worker. The church and the image celebrate twice a year (one on 30 June and the other on 15 August). A religious celebration on that day is preceded and followed by traditional celebrations with folk music. People from the island and all the surrounding area come to attend.

In the early 1990s, the water system was rebuilt and now every household has running water. As well, in recent years, all the footpaths that were once dirt have been upgraded to stone or pavement. Kalamos, once a remote island without electricity or a proper water system, now has all the conveniences of the mainland. The nearest lyceum (middle school) and gymnasium (secondary school) are in Aetolia-Acarnania where all of the students from the latter categories attend. There is a public kindergarten, elementary and primary school in the main village of Kalamos where all of the children permanently resident on the island attend.

The island is easily reached from the mainland by a regular ferry service from the nearby port of Mytikas in Aetoloakarnania, year round.

The island is geographically situated in the core of the inner Ionian marine protected area, the largest marine protected area in Greece.

== Population ==
Year	Island Population
1981	454
1991	465
2001	543
2011	496
2021	342

== Education ==
There is an elementary school in Kalamos. In September 2006 it had two sixth grade students and no other students. It is scheduled to close in 2027.

== Notable people ==
- Helen Maroulis
- Paul Skallas (Lindyman)

== See also ==
- List of settlements in the Lefkada regional unit
- Kalamos Island biological field station
