= Karya, Lefkada =

Karya Καρυά
- Municipal unit
- Location within the regional unit

- Location within Greece
- Coordinates: 38°45′N 20°39′E
- Country: Greece
- Administrative region: Ionian Islands
- Regional unit: Lefkada
- Municipality: Lefkada
- Districts: 3

Area
  - Municipal unit: 30.867 km^{2} (11.918 sq mi)

Population (2021)
  - Municipal unit: 663
  - Municipal unit density: 21.5/km^{2} (55.6/sq mi)
  - Community: 429
- Time zone: UTC+2 (EET)
  - Summer (DST): UTC+3 (EEST)
- Postal code: 310 81
- Area code: 26290
- Vehicle registration: EY
- Website: www.karya.gr

Karya (Greek: Καρυά) is a former municipality on the island of Lefkada, Ionian Islands, Greece. Since the 2011 local government reform it is part of the municipality Lefkada, of which it is a municipal unit. It lies in the central part of Lefkada. It has a land area of 30.867 km^{2}. A large part of the population live in the former municipal seat, the town of Karyá.

The village Karya is located on the slopes of Pyrgos at 500 m above sea level. The highest point in the municipal unit is the mountain Stavrota, elevation 1,158 m.

== Subdivisions ==
The municipal unit Karya is subdivided into the following communities (constituent villages in brackets):

- Egklouvi (Egklouvi, Ammokampos)
- Karya
- Pigadisanoi

== Population ==
Year	Village population	Municipality population
1981	1,152	-
1991	957	1,497
2001	989	1,247
2011	589	871
2021	429	663

== Notable people ==
- Apostolos Kaklamanis (1936-) politician

== See also ==
- List of settlements in the Lefkada regional unit
