= Lefkada (regional unit) =

Lefkada Περιφερειακή ενότητα Λευκάδας
- Regional unit
- Municipalities of Lefkada

- Lefkada within Greece

- Location within Greece
- Coordinates: 38°45′N 20°40′E
- Country: Greece
- Administrative region: Ionian Islands
- Seat: Lefkada (city)

Area
  - Total: 359 km^{2} (139 sq mi)

Population (2021)
  - Total: 22,826
  - Density: 63.6/km^{2} (165/sq mi)
- Time zone: UTC+2 (EET)
  - Summer (DST): UTC+3 (EEST)
- Postal code: 31x xx
- Area code: 26450
- Vehicle registration: ΕΥ
- Website: www.lefkada.gr

Lefkada (Greek: Περιφερειακή ενότητα Λευκάδας) is one of the regional units of Greece. It is part of the region of Ionian Islands. The capital of the regional unit is the town of Lefkada. The regional unit consists of the islands of Lefkada, Meganisi, Kalamos, Kastos and several smaller islands, all in the Ionian Sea.

== Administration ==
The regional unit Lefkada is subdivided into 2 municipalities. These are (number as in the map in the infobox):

- Lefkada (1)
- Meganisi (2)

== Prefecture ==
As a part of the 2011 Kallikratis government reform, the regional unit Lefkada was created out of the former prefecture Lefkada (Greek: Νομός Λευκάδας). The prefecture, created in 1864, had the same territory as the present regional unit. At the same time, the municipalities were reorganised, according to the table below.

New municipality	Old municipalities	Seat
Lefkada	Lefkada (city)	Lefkada (city)
Lefkada	Apolloni	Lefkada (city)
Lefkada	Ellomenos	Lefkada (city)
Lefkada	Kalamos	Lefkada (city)
Lefkada	Karya	Lefkada (city)
Lefkada	Kastos	Lefkada (city)
Lefkada	Sfakiotes	Lefkada (city)
Meganisi	Meganisi	Meganisi

== See also ==
- List of settlements in the Lefkada regional unit
