= Lefkada =

Greek island in the Ionian Sea

Lefkada Λευκάδα
- Municipality
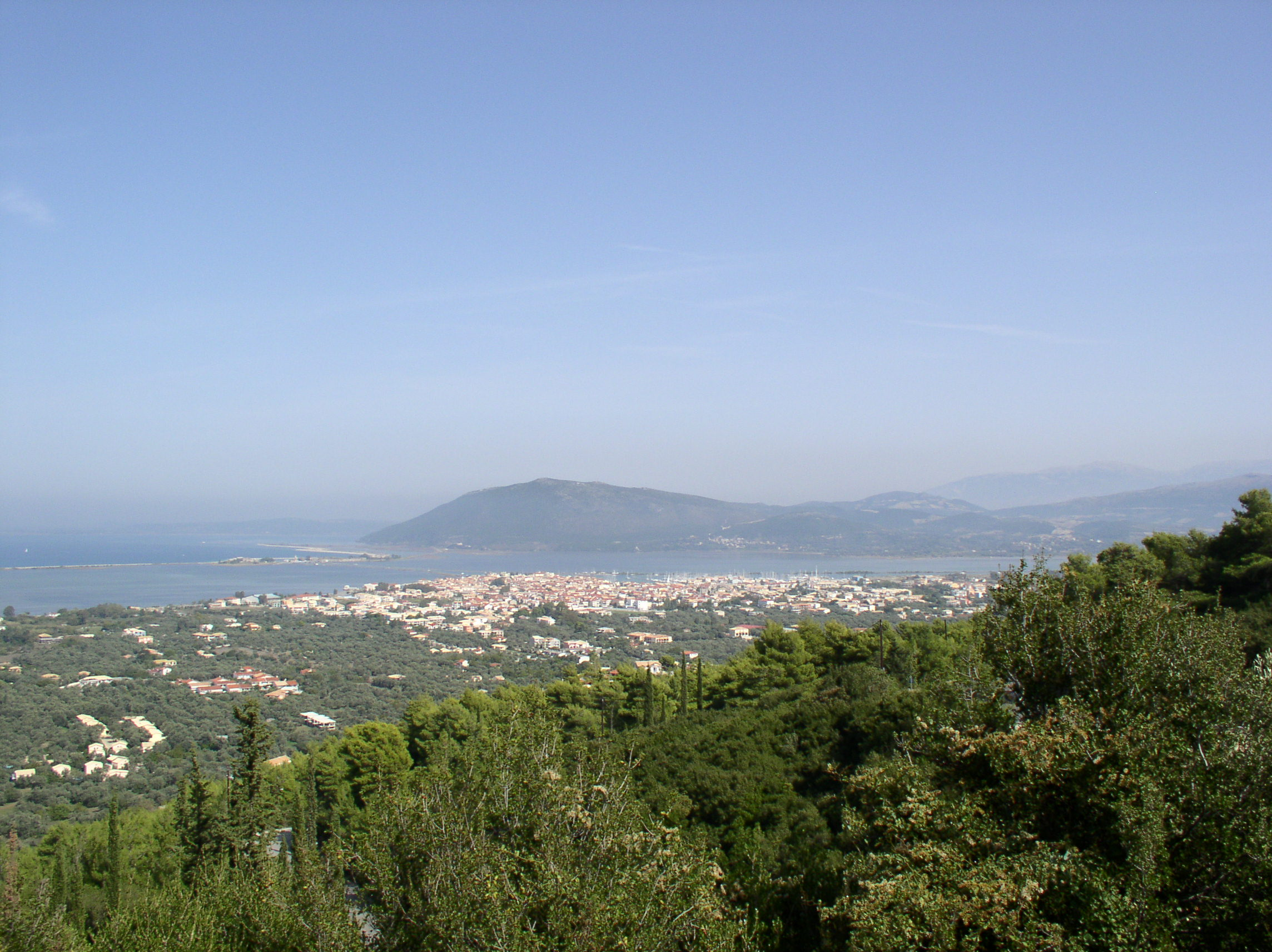
- View of Lefkada (city)

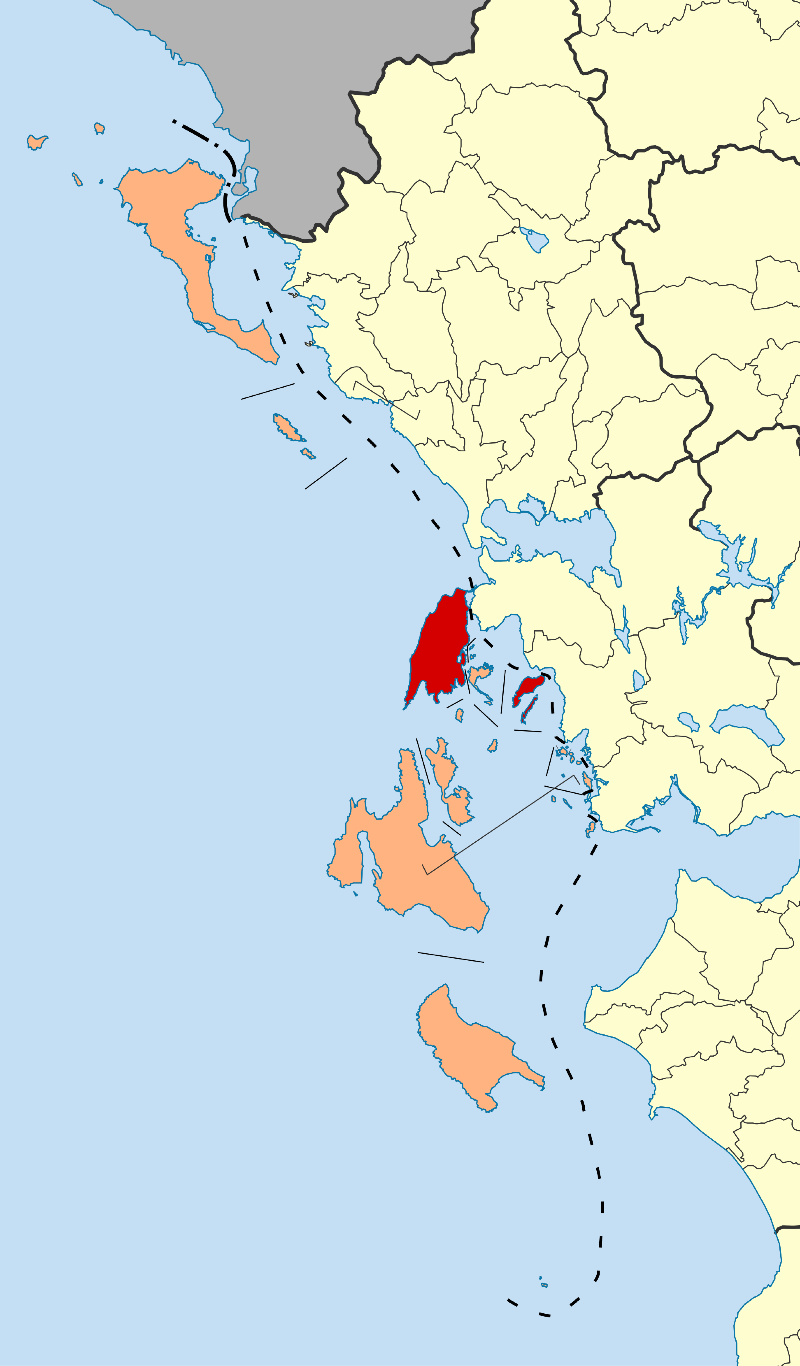

- Location within Greece
- Coordinates: 38°43′N 20°39′E
- Country: Greece
- Administrative region: Ionian Islands
- Regional unit: Lefkada
- Seat: Lefkada City

Area
  - Municipality: 333.6 km^{2} (128.8 sq mi)

Population (2021)
  - Municipality: 21,900
  - Density: 65.6/km^{2} (170/sq mi)
- Time zone: UTC+2 (EET)
  - Summer (DST): UTC+3 (EEST)
- Website: lefkada.gov.gr

Lefkada (Greek: Λευκάδα, Lefkáda, [lefˈkaða]), also known as Lefkas or Leukas (Ancient Greek and Katharevousa: Λευκάς, Leukás, modern pronunciation Lefkás) and Leucadia, is a Greek island in the Ionian Sea on the west coast of Greece, connected to the mainland by a long causeway and floating bridge. The principal town of the island and seat of the municipality is Lefkada. It is situated in the northern part of the island, approximately 25 minutes by automobile away from Aktion National Airport. The island is part of the regional unit of Lefkada.

== Geography ==
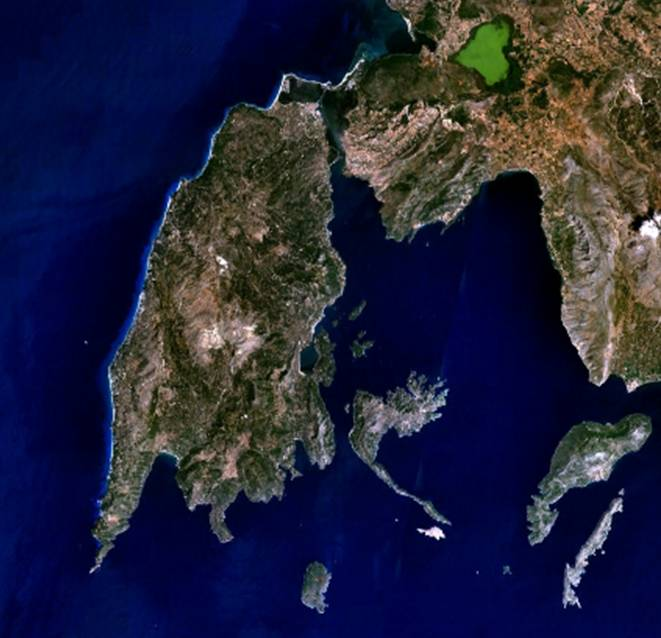
The island of Lefkada in a NASA World Wind satellite picture.

Lefkada measures 35 kilometres (22 miles) from north to south, and 15 kilometres (9 miles) from east to west. The area of the island is about 302 square kilometres (117 sq mi), the area of the municipality (including the islands Kalamos, Kastos and several smaller islets) is 333.58 km^{2} (128.80 sq mi). Its highest point is the mountain Stavrota, at 1,158 metres (3,799 feet) above sea level, situated in the middle of the island. The east coast section of the island has the small resorts of Lygia, Nikiana and Perigiali, all north of Nidri, the largest resort on the island. It is set in a sheltered location, with views across to Skorpios (formerly owned by Aristotle Onassis), Meganisi and other small islands, as well as the Greek mainland. The main coastal road from Lefkada to Vasiliki runs through the village, although a bypass has now been completed which skirts the village to the west. There are regular car ferries to Kefalonia, Ithaca and Meganissi.

20 kilometres (12 miles) south of Nidri is the resort of Vasiliki, a windsurfing center. There are ferries to Kefalonia and Ithaca from Vasiliki. South of Vasiliki is Cape Lefkada, where Cephalus and the Greek female poet Sappho allegedly leapt to their death from the 30 m high cliffs on two separate occasions.

The famous beach of Porto Katsiki is located on Lefkada's west coast. Lefkada was attached to mainland Greece (see below about Homer's Ithaca being Lefkada). The Corinthians dug a trench in the 7th century BC on its isthmus.

The southernmost tip of the island is called Cape Dukato, a name sometimes applied to the whole island.

=== Climate ===
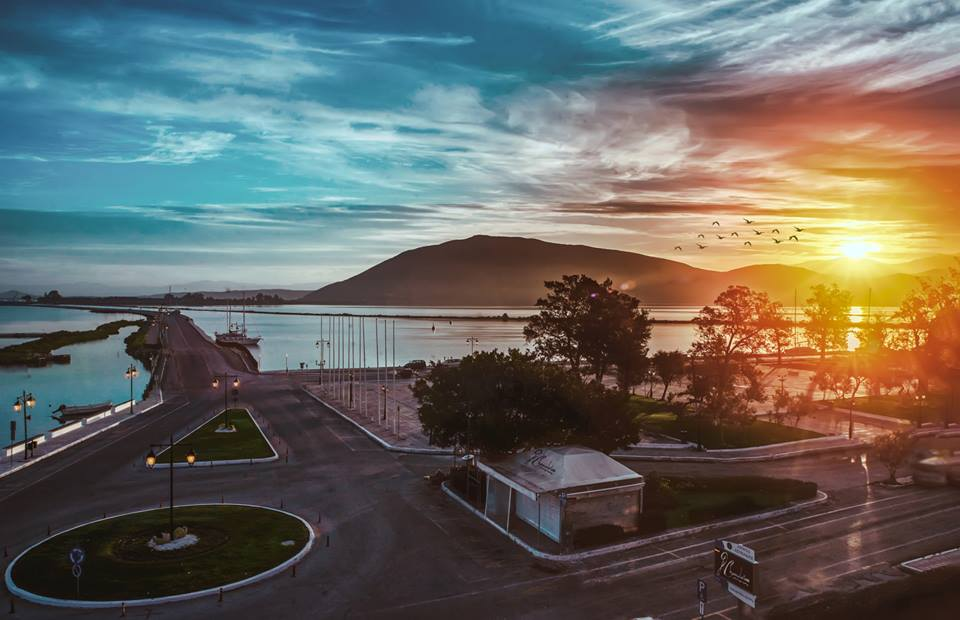
Sunrise in front of the road entrance of the city

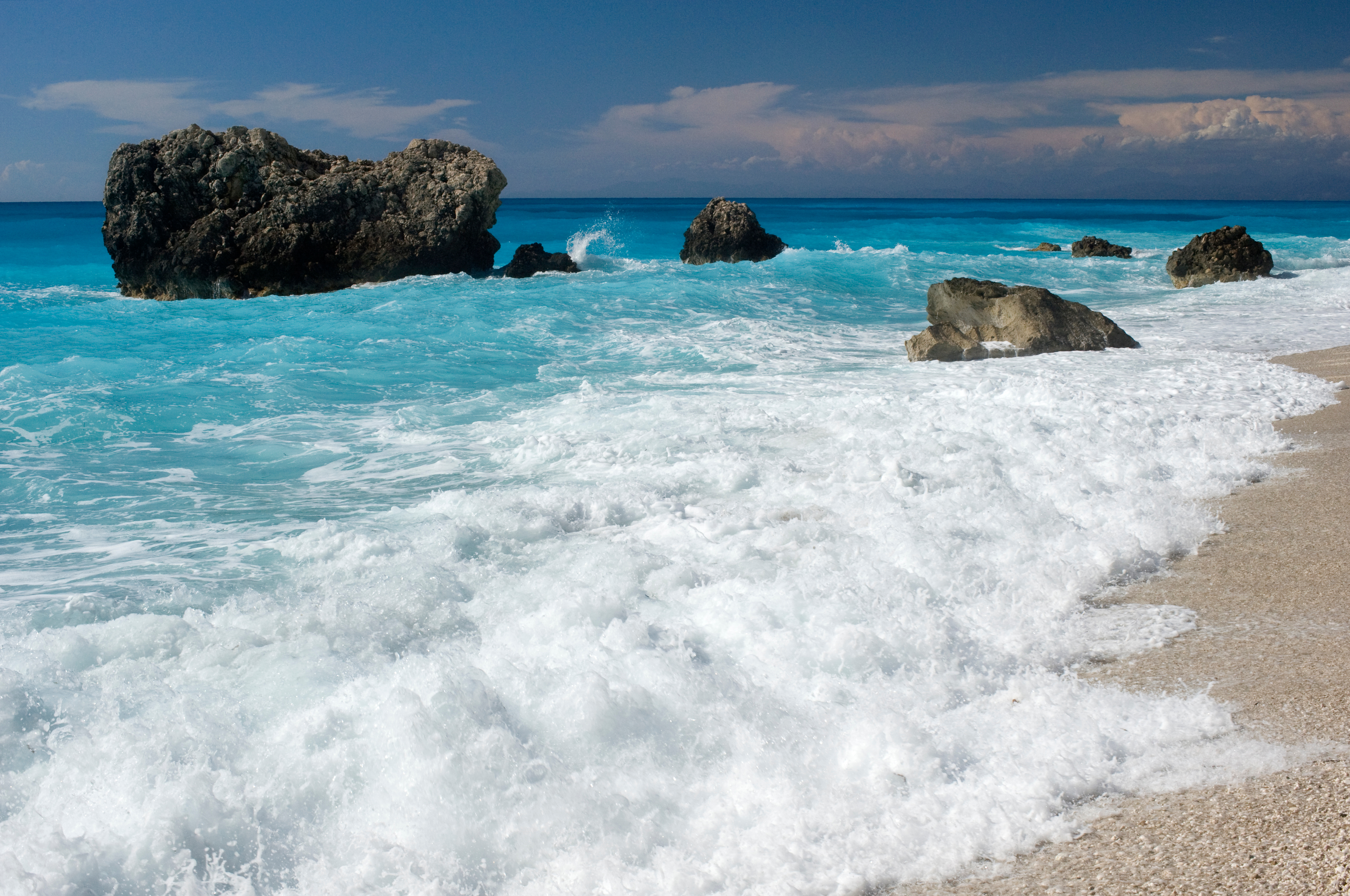
Megali Petra beach

The island has a typical Mediterranean climate with hot summers and cool winters, or Csa according to the Köppen climate classification system.

== History ==
=== Antiquity ===
The island is linked to Odysseus, the hero of Homer's Odyssey, who ruled it and neighbouring islands from Ithaca. The German archaeologist Wilhelm Dörpfeld, having performed excavations at various locations on Lefkada, was able to obtain funding to do work on the island by suggesting that Lefkada was Homer's Ithaca, and the palace of Odysseus was located west of Nydri on the south coast of Lefkada. There have been suggestions by local tourism officials that several passages in the Odyssey point to Lefkada as a possible model for Homeric Ithaca. The most notable of these passages, pushed by the local tourism board, describes Ithaca as an island reachable on foot, which was the case for Lefkada, since it is not really an island, being connected to the mainland by a narrow causeway. According to Strabo, the coast of Acarnania was called Leucas in earlier times.

The ancient sources call Leucas a Corinthian colony, perhaps with a Corcyraen participation. There was a cult to Apollo Leucatos at the south western cape of the island, where white cliffs stand, that may have given its name to the island. This was a site where criminals were thrown (hence "Leucadian trial") in order to judge their guilt or innocence from their injury at the fall. Furthermore, according to legend, it was the jumping spot of Sappho when she committed suicide out of frustrated love and also that of Artemisia of Caria, and therefore may have some connection to Aphrodite.

During the Peloponnesian War, Leucas joined the Peloponnesian League. Later, the town was conquered during the 3rd century BC by Agathocles of Syracuse and was annexed to the Roman Republic in the next century, during their conquest of Greece. The famous naval battle of Actium was fought not far away, to the north east.

In antiquity, the island was connected to the mainland by a bridge, which was the longest stone bridge of ancient Greece.

In medieval British legend, Brutus of Troy found Lefkada abandoned after pirate attacks, and, after offering a sacrifice to a statue of Diana in the temple of a ruined city there, was granted a vision telling him to go to Britain and found an empire.

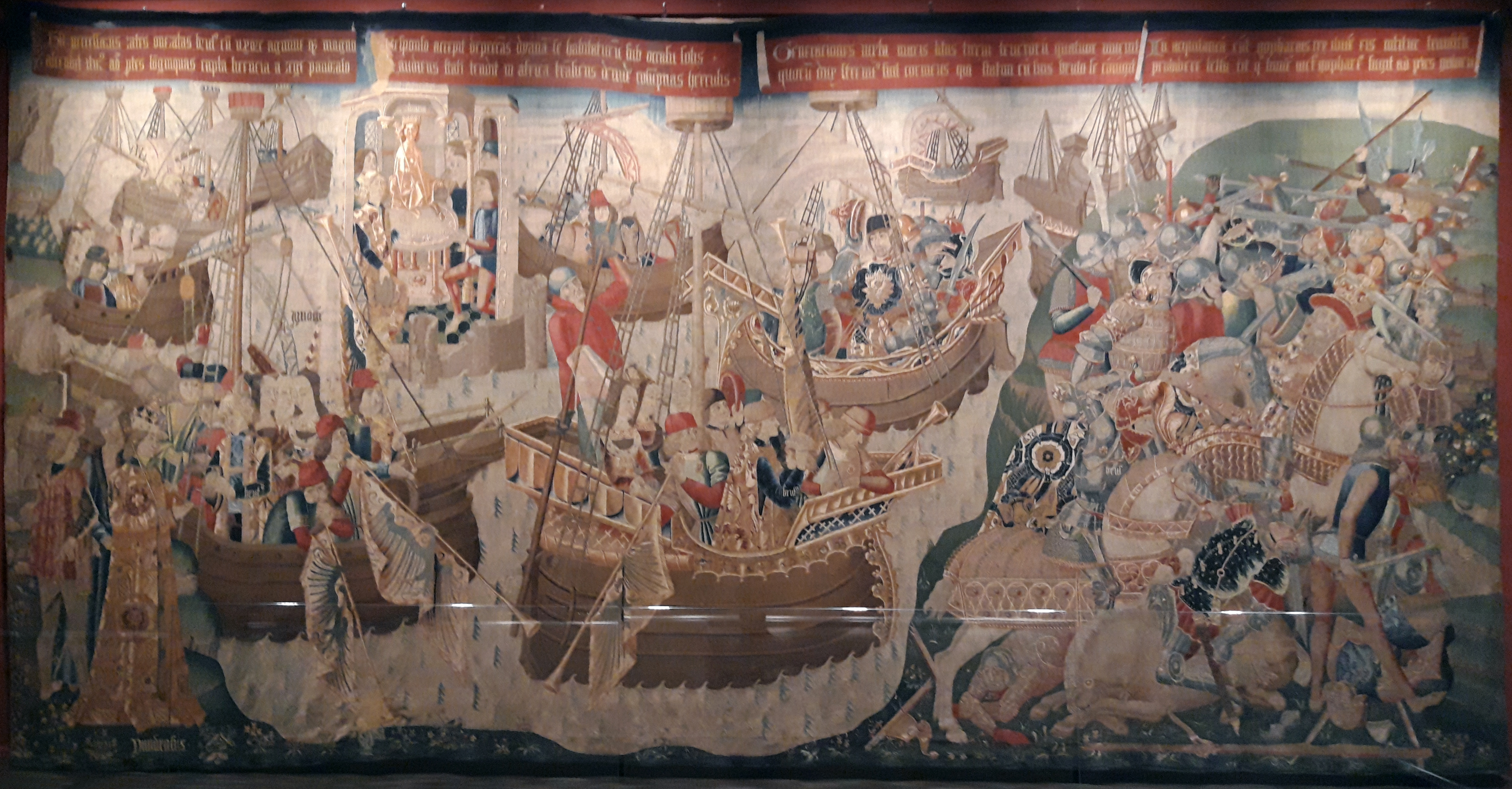
Brutus in the temple on Lefkada (upper left) in a c. 1475 tapestry now in the Cathedral of the Savior of Zaragoza

=== Middle Ages ===
==== Byzantine period ====
No information survives on the island during the early Byzantine period, when the town possibly disappeared in the turmoils of the Migration Period. Nevertheless, unlike the Epirote mainland, where widespread Slavic settlement is attested from the late 6th until mid-8th centuries, only a handful of traces attest to a Slavic settlement in Lefkada.

Information continues to be sparse during the Middle Byzantine period. The island is attested as a bishopric at the Fourth Council of Constantinople in 879, and was raised to archbishopric under Emperor Leo VI the Wise (r. 886–912). Administratively, it was likely part of the Theme of Cephallenia. Liutprand of Cremona visited the island during his 968 embassy to Constantinople. In 1099, it was raided by Dagobert of Pisa, and it is mentioned in al-Idrisi's geography in the mid-12th century.

==== Epirote and Latin rule ====
The Republic of Venice was accorded privileges in the island in 1198 and possession of the island in the treaty of partition of the Byzantine Empire in 1204. Lefkada apparently became part of the Despotate of Epirus, although this is not explicitly attested until 1259.

The name Santa Maura is first attested for the island and its capital in 1292, when Genoese ships in Byzantine employ raided it. In 1295, the Despot of Epirus Nikephoros I Komnenos Doukas ceded the island to his son-in-law, the Count Palatine of Cephalonia and Zakynthos John I Orsini. Orsini soon after received permission from Charles II of Naples to build a castle there, which became the core of the Castle of Santa Maura.

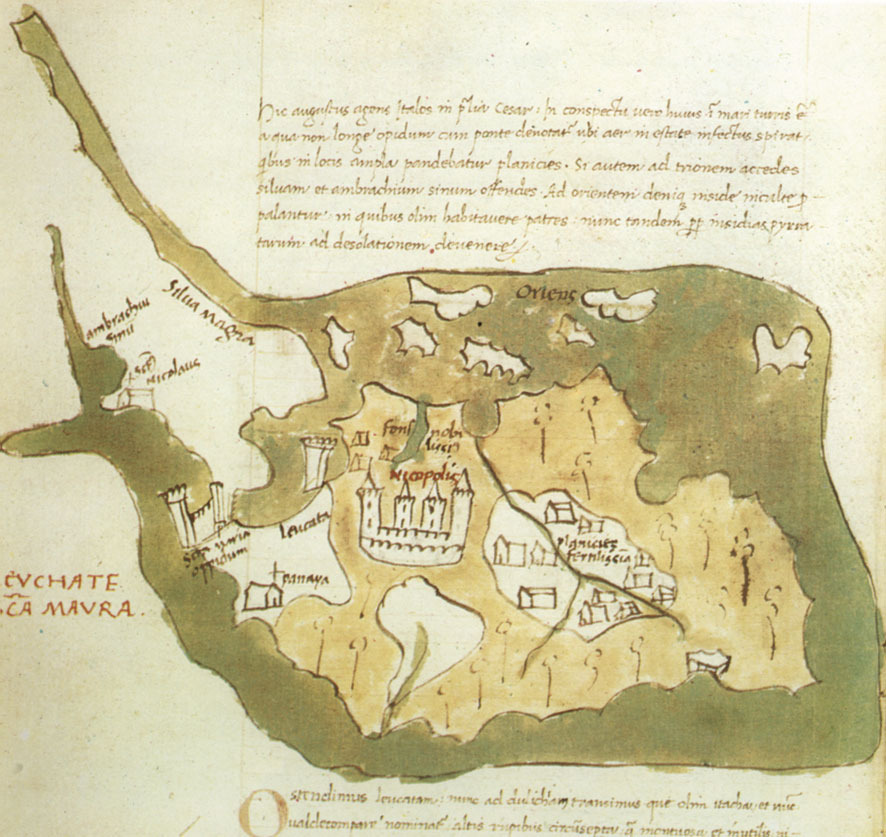
Map of Lefkada by Cristoforo Buondelmonti, c. 1420

The Orsini family lost Lefkada in 1331 to Walter VI of Brienne, who in 1343 ceded the castrum Sancte Maure and the island to the Venetian Graziano Giorgio. In 1360/62, Leonardo I Tocco seized Lefkada, assuming the title of duke (dux Lucate), whence the island is sometimes also referred to as "the Duchy" (el Ducato and variants thereof) in Western sources of the period. The local Orthodox archbishop was evicted. After Albanian clans took over much of Epirus in the 1350s and 1360s, they launched frequent attacks on the island between 1375 and 1395. Carlo I Tocco (r. 1376–1429) made the island the capital of his domains, which apart from the County Palatine of Cephalonia and Zakynthos also included much of the Epirote mainland, and enlarged the fortified town.

In 1413, the Prince of Achaea, Centurione II Zaccaria, launched an attack on Lefkada and its castle with Albanian mercenaries, but were defeated with help from the Republic of Venice. The Ottomans captured most of Epirus and raided the island, leading the Tocci to consider ceding it to the Venetians.

Faced with expanding Ottoman power in the mainland, the Tocci became vassals of the Ottoman sultans. The last of them, Leonardo III Tocco (r. 1448–1479) was helped to maintain his rule through his marriage to Milica Branković, a niece of the highly esteemed stepmother of the Ottoman sultan Mehmed the Conqueror (r. 1444–1446, 1451–1481); but when she died, he married the Aragonese Francesca Marzano. The couple quickly became hated by their Greek subjects due to their oppressive taxation. Lefkada, along with Cephalonia and Zakynthos, was captured by the Ottoman admiral Gedik Ahmed Pasha in 1479. Part of the population was deported to Constantinople as part of Mehmed's policy to repopulate his capital.

=== Ottoman period ===
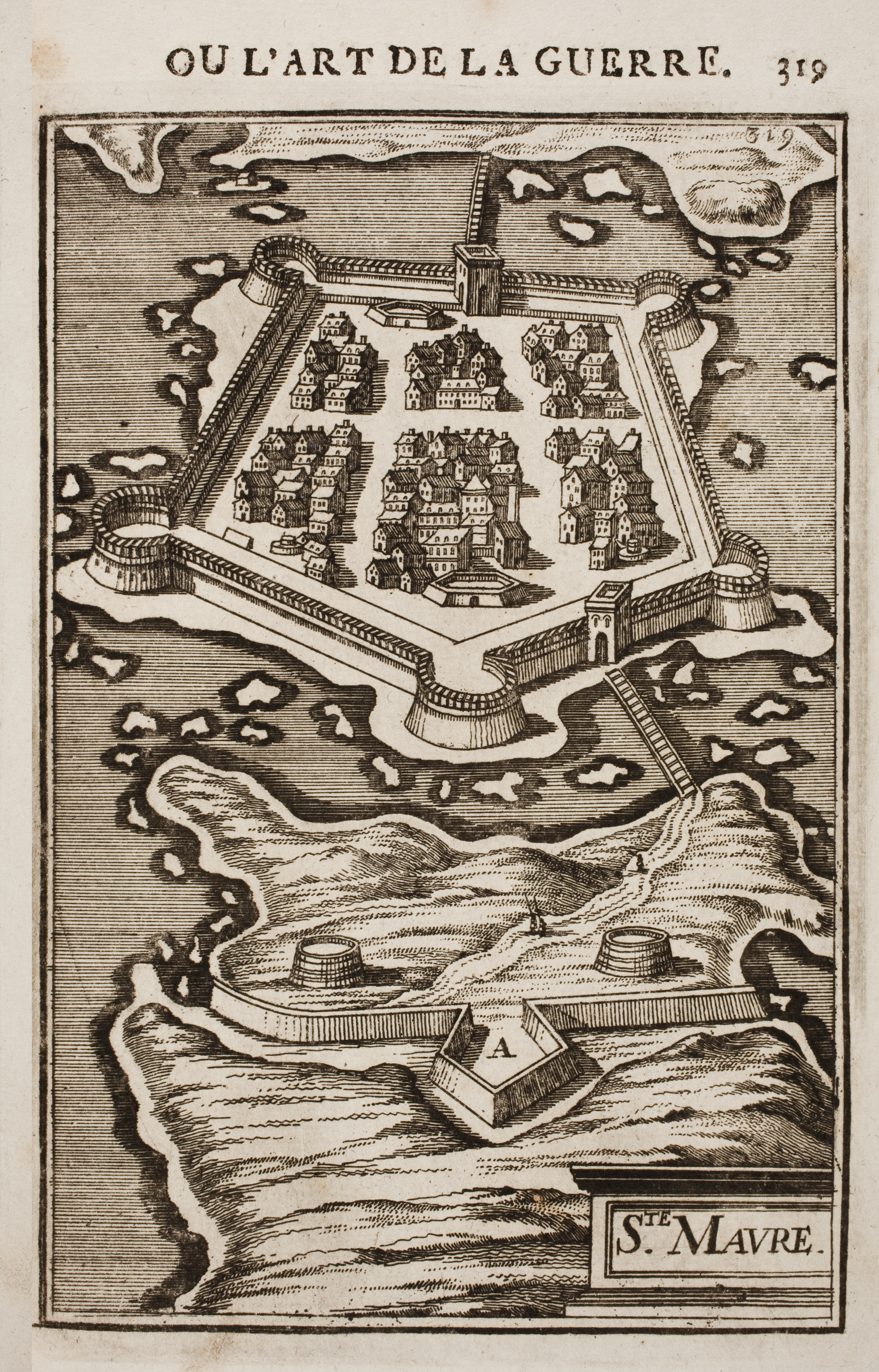
The castle and walled town of Santa Maura ("Ste. Maure"), by Manesson Mallet, 1696

The Ottomans called the island Levkada (Ottoman Turkish: لفكادة or لفقادة), with the name Aya Mavra (ايامورة, from Greek Αγία Μαύρα, meaning "Santa Maura") reserved for the castle and capital of the island, where almost the entire population lived. Under Ottoman rule, it was initially a kaza of the sanjak of Karli-Eli, which from c. 1550 belonged to the Eyalet of the Archipelago, subordinated to the chief admiral of the Ottoman navy, the Kapudan Pasha. The kaza of Lefkada comprised not only the island, but also part of the adjoining mainland. The Venetians briefly occupied the island in 1502–03 during the Second Ottoman–Venetian War, but returned it to the Ottomans in the final peace settlement. With about a thousand inhabitants in c. 1530, the town of Lefkada was both the largest settlement and the main military installation in the sanjak, with 111 soldiers and 9 artillerymen. As with the rest of the sanjak, at the time the entire population appears to have been Christian, and only the fortress garrisons and administrators were Muslim; thus the only mosques were located inside the fortresses.

A lack of water led to the construction of a 3 kilometres (1.9 mi) long aqueduct from the island's interior to the town in 1564, during the reign of Sultan Suleiman the Magnificent (r. 1520–1566). Bringing water to the walled town, as well as to the much larger—some 700–800 houses—open town that had grown around it, was one of the most important works of Ottoman civil architecture in the western Balkans. On top of the aqueduct was a footpath that provided the only access to the island, other than by the sea. In the aftermath of the Ottoman defeat at the Battle of Lepanto, the castle was unsuccessfully besieged by the forces of the Holy League. As a result, it was completely rebuilt and enlarged by the Kapudan Pasha Kılıç Ali Pasha, in 1572–1574, into a hexagonal fortress with large towers as artillery platforms.

In the 17th century, Lefkada became a separate sanjak within the Eyalet of the Archipelago, although, according to Evliya Çelebi it belonged briefly to the Morea Eyalet in the 15th and 17th centuries. Evliya visited the island in 1670/71 and left a long and accurate description of the fortifications, as well as of the town, where Islam had apparently made considerable progress. According to Evliya, the walled town boasted five Friday mosques, including an Imperial Mosque (Hünkar Camii), which was a converted church, a minor mosque (masjid), a madrasa, two schools (maktab), a bath (hammam), and five public fountains (çeshme). The walled town, with its 200 stone houses, was now occupied exclusively by Muslims, while the two suburbs (varosh) to the east and west were built of wood and had a mixed population. The western one was far larger, with 300 houses to 40–50 in the eastern one, and had a wooden mosque and masjid, a tekke, a maktab, two caravanserais, as well as seven small churches. Evliya remarks that this suburb had many wine shops, which were popular with both the inhabitants and the garrison. Another suburb (the Varosh-i Lefqada) was located on the island itself, with some 700 houses, all of them inhabited by Christian Greeks, who had 20 churches. Evliya's account is corroborated by Jacob Spon and George Wheler's account that the town had about 5,000 to 6,000 inhabitants, mostly Greeks or Turks.

According to the descriptions of travellers like Evliya, Lefkada was an urban centre of some importance, boasting "two of the largest works of Ottoman civil and military architecture in the Western Balkans", namely the aqueduct built by Sultan Suleiman the Magnificent (r. 1520–1566) and the Castle of Santa Maura, which was completely rebuilt by Kılıç Ali Pasha in the reign of Sultan Selim II (r. 1566–1574).

=== Venetian period ===
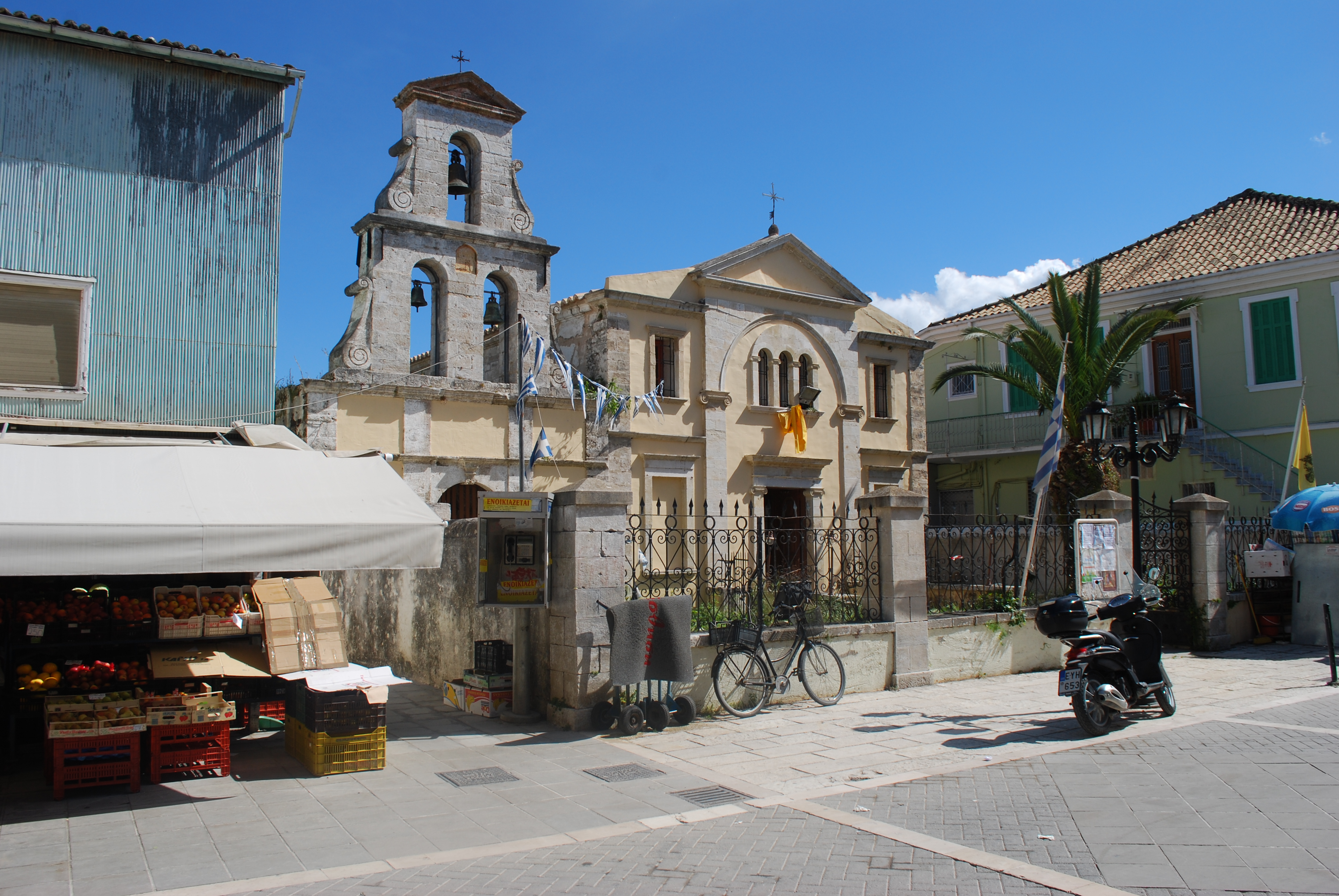
Church of the Theotokos, Lefkada city.

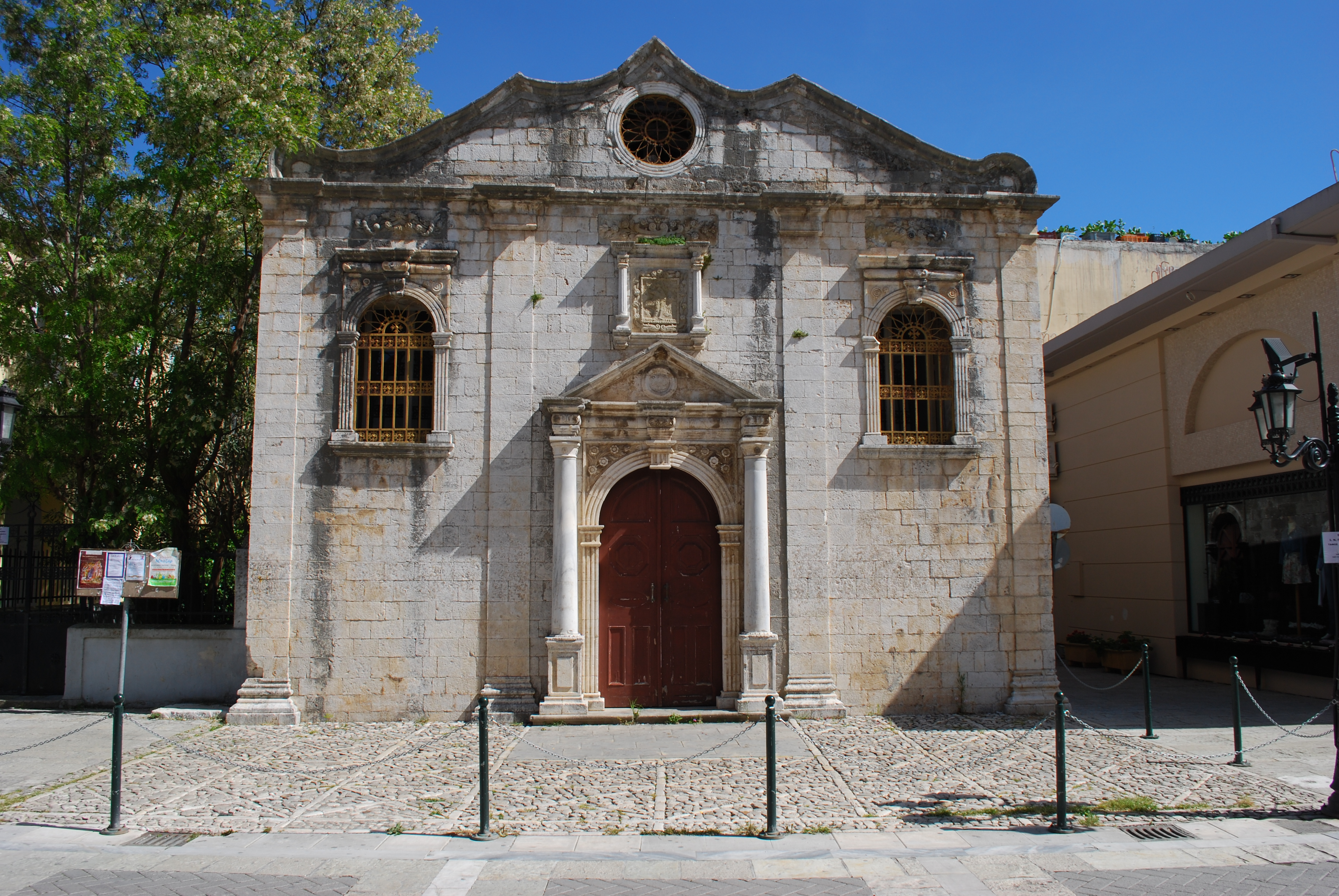
Church of the Pantokrator, Lefkada city.

The island was conquered by the Venetians under Francesco Morosini following a sixteen-day siege in 1684, during the opening stages of the Morean War. Morosini evacuated the walled town and demolished both it and the two suburbs directly outside the walls, turning them into the castle's glacis. Only the island suburb remained, known as "Amaxiki" until the 19th century. With the evicted inhabitants settling there, this became the main town of the island, the predecessor of the modern city of Lefkada. The Venetians also removed all buildings associated with Islam.

The Venetians modernized the castle in the 1710s, removing the last traces of the medieval castle and adding outworks towards the eastern, mainland side. During the Seventh Ottoman–Venetian War, following the Ottoman reconquest of the Morea in 1715, the Venetians initially abandoned Lefkada to focus their resources on the defence of Corfu. The castle was abandoned and partly demolished, but after the Siege of Corfu ended in a Venetian victory, the island was reoccupied and the fortifications restored.

Venetian rule over the island was uninterrupted, apart from a rebellion of the local Greeks in 1769, until the Fall of the Republic of Venice in 1797.

=== Post-Venetian period until the union with Greece ===
Following the end of the Republic of Venice in 1797, Lefkada, like the other Venetian Ionian Islands, was occupied by the French, who held it until a Russo-Turkish expedition under Fyodor Ushakov captured it in 1799. In 1800, the Septinsular Republic was established, a Russian protectorate under de jure Ottoman suzerainty. The Russian Empire employed troops recruited from fugitive klephts and armatoloi in the Ionian Islands, particularly of Lefkada. Among these were captains Anastasios Tselios and Apostolos Levendakis; in 1802, Levendakis offered to raise a company of 60 fighters on Lefkada to support the Russians. Ali Pasha of Ioannina, who coveted possession of the Ionian Islands, besieged Lefkada in 1807. For this purpose he erected two forts on the mainland shore, the Tekke Castle and the St. George's Castle, but his attacks on the Castle of Santa Maura were successfully repulsed by the local Russian and Greek forces of the Septinsular Republic. French rule was restored in 1807 after the Treaty of Tilsit, but in 1810, the British captured the island. In 1815, the United Kingdom set up the United States of the Ionian Islands as a protectorate, including Lefkada.

Much of the town, including the Ottoman aqueduct, was destroyed in an earthquake in 1825. After this, the town was rebuilt in wood to prevent similar damage. In 1864 the islands were ceded to Greece. The island then numbered about 24,000 inhabitants.

== Lafcadio Hearn Historical Center ==
The first museum in Europe for Lafcadio Hearn, who was born on the island and is named after it, was inaugurated in Lefkada on July 4, 2014, as Lafcadio Hearn Historical Center. It is located within the Cultural Center of Lefkada, in the same building as the Archaeological Museum. It contains early editions, rare books and Japanese collectibles. The visitors, through photos, texts and exhibits, can wander among the significant events of Lafcadio Hearn's life, and also in the civilizations of Europe, America and Japan of late 19th and early 20th centuries, through the open mind of his lectures, writings, and tales. The municipalities of Kumamoto, Matsue, Shinjuku, Yaizu, as well as Toyama University, the Koizumi family, and other people from Japan and Greece contributed to the establishment of the Lafcadio Hearn Historical Center.

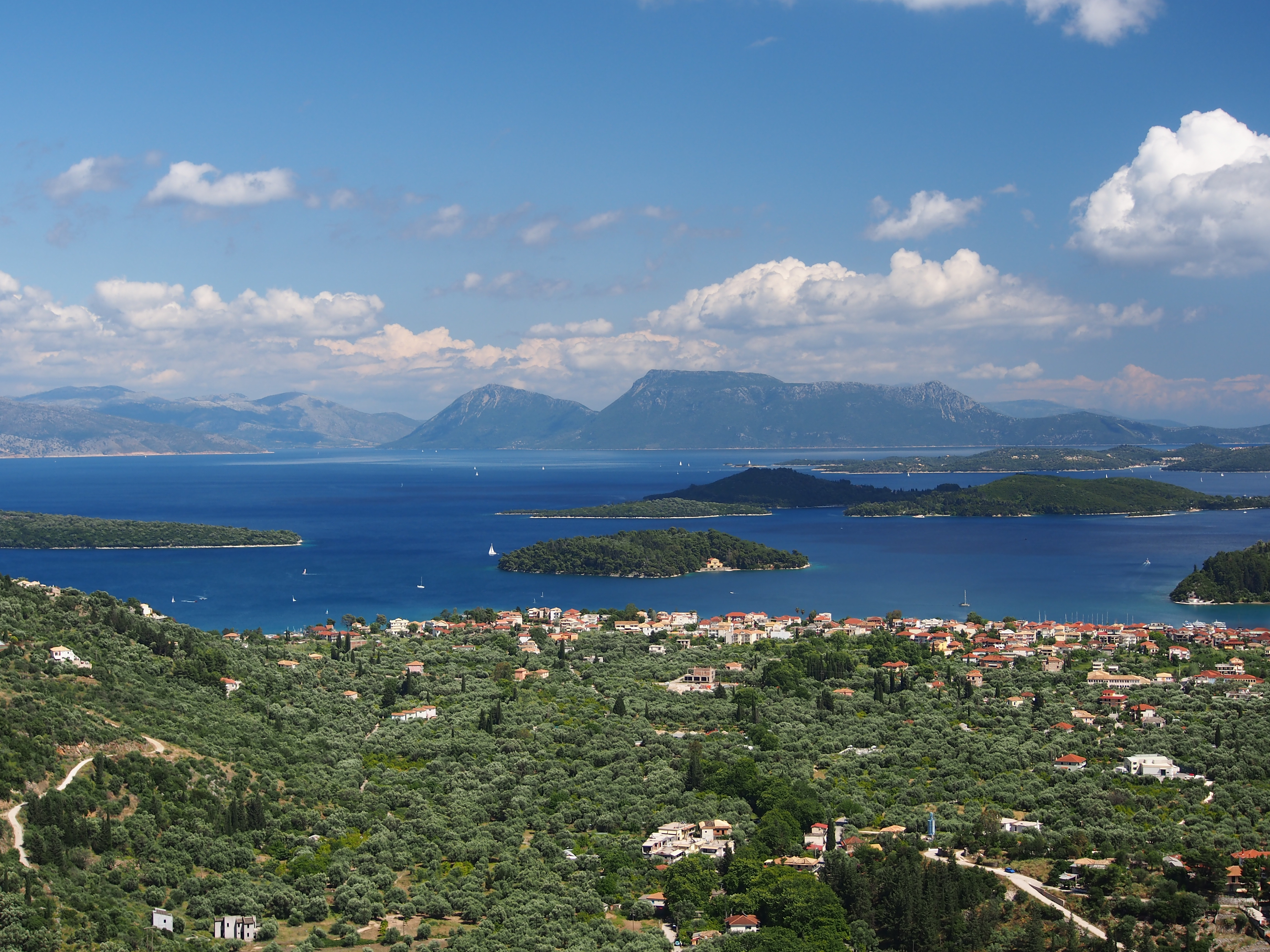
View of Nydri

Note: as of May 2026, the Lafcadio Hearn Historical Center is closed due to works in the building.

== Municipality ==
The present municipality of Lefkada was formed in the 2011 local government reform by the merger of the following 7 former municipalities, which became municipal units:

- Apollonioi
- Ellomenos
- Kalamos
- Karya
- Kastos
- Lefkada (city)
- Sfakiotes

The municipality covers the island of Lefkada and the smaller islands of Kastos and Kalamos.

== Education ==
Regional Development Department, part of Ionian University based in Lefkada.

== Sport ==
The island of Lefkada and the town of Vasiliki are known as a hotspot for extreme sport lovers. The island has become a favourite spot for windsurfers. Another sport is the 4X4 events and opportunities for offroad activities.

== Transport ==
- Greek National Road 42
- Aktion (Preveza) Airport

== Notable people ==
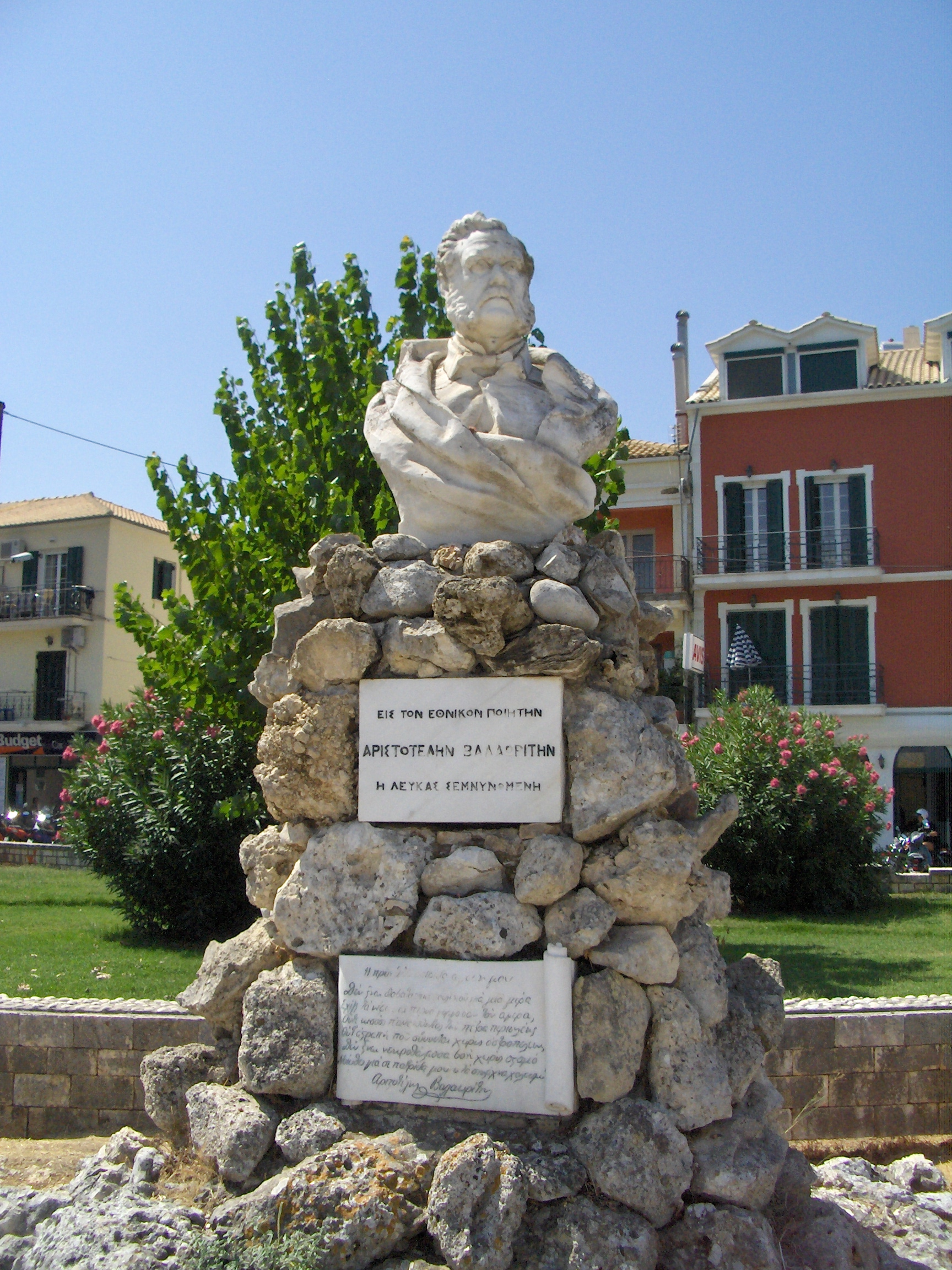
Bust of Aristotelis Valaoritis

(in chronological order)

- Marcos Christino Fioravanti (1775–1862), co-founder of Santo Antônio da Patrulha in Brazil
- Frederick Temple (1821–1902), Archbishop of Canterbury
- Aristotelis Valaoritis (1824–1879), poet and politician
- Lafcadio Hearn (1850–1904), Greco-Irish orientalist and writer, born on and named after the island
- Petros Soumilas (1861–1955), Greek Army officer who reached the rank of lieutenant general.
- Dimitrios Golemis (1874–1941), athlete
- Aggelos Sikelianos (1884–1951), poet and playwright
- Tzavalas Karousos or Karoussos (1904–1969), actor
- Panos Rontoyannis (1911–1996), philologist and historian
- Theodoros Stamos (1922–1997), Greek-American painter
- Apostolos Kaklamanis (1936-), politician
- Evaggelos Vlassopoulos (1935–2002), politician
- George Ktenas (1938–2004), politician
- Agnes Baltsa (1944-), opera singer
- George Maragos (1949-), Greek-American politician
- Maria Vamvakinou (1959- ), Australian politician
- Spyros Vrettos (1960-), poet
- Spiros Marangos (1967-), footballer
- Marina Lambrini Diamandis (1985-), singer and songwriter

== Gallery ==
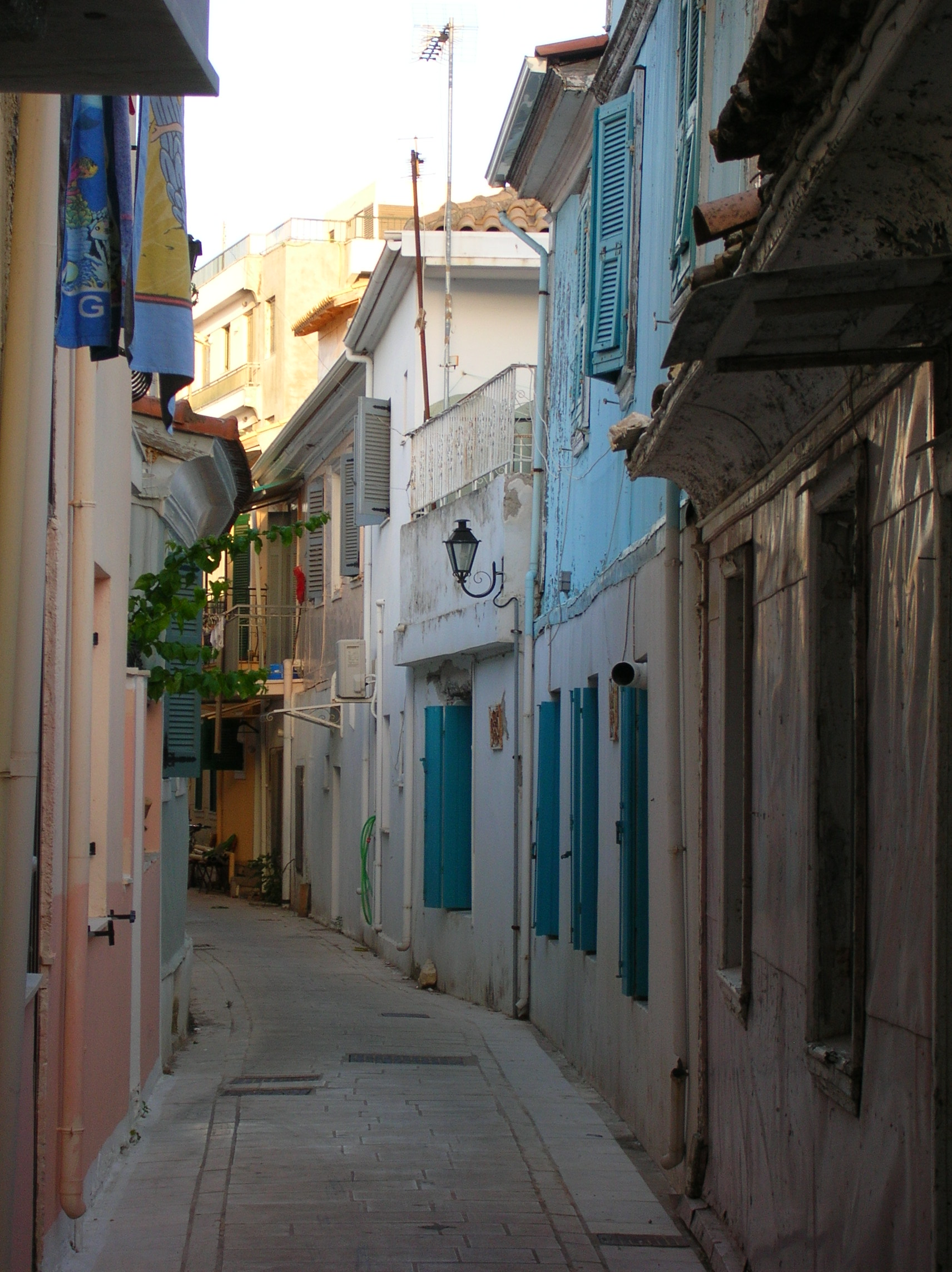
Traditional street of Lefkada (city)

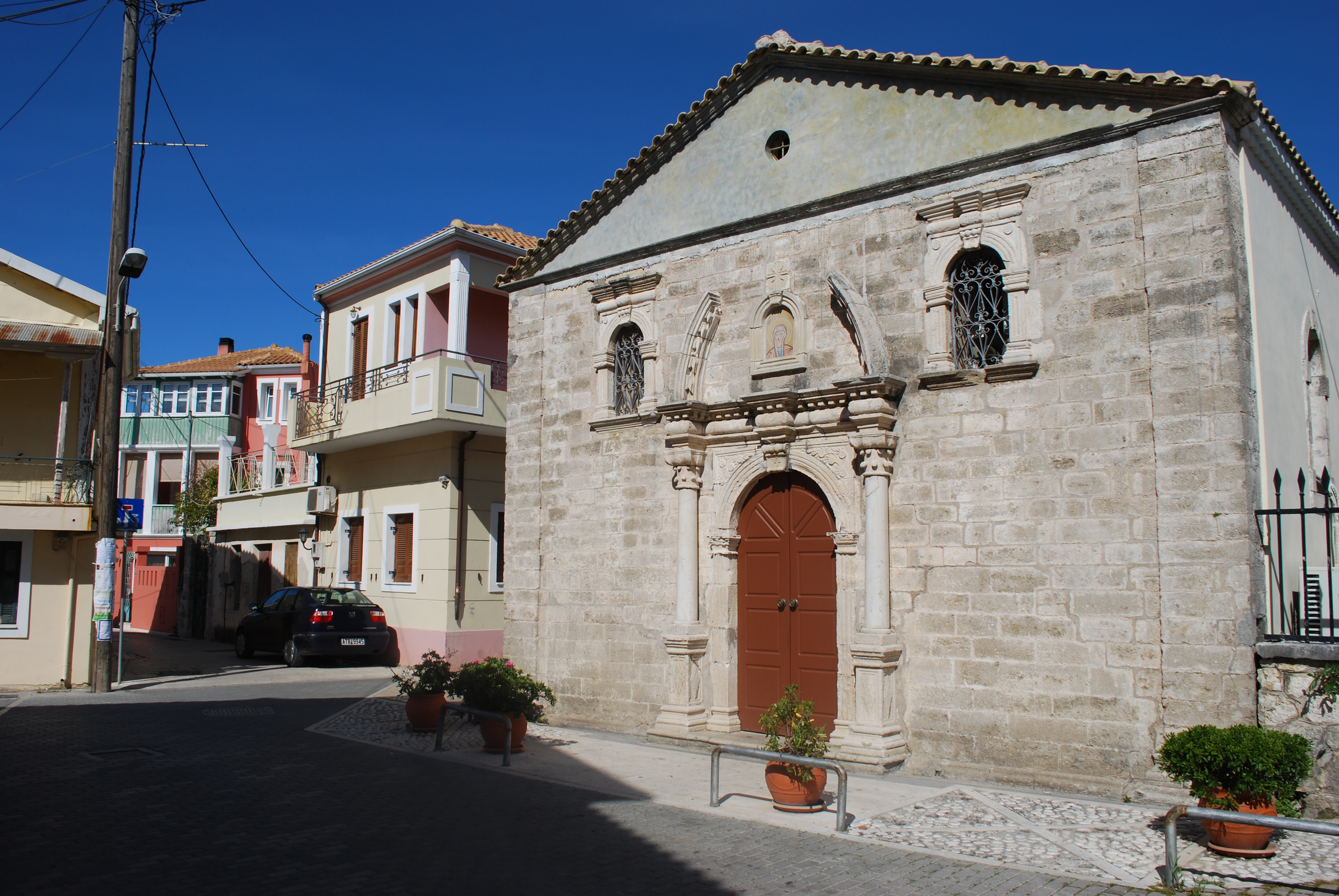
Panagia ton Xenon, Lefkada city

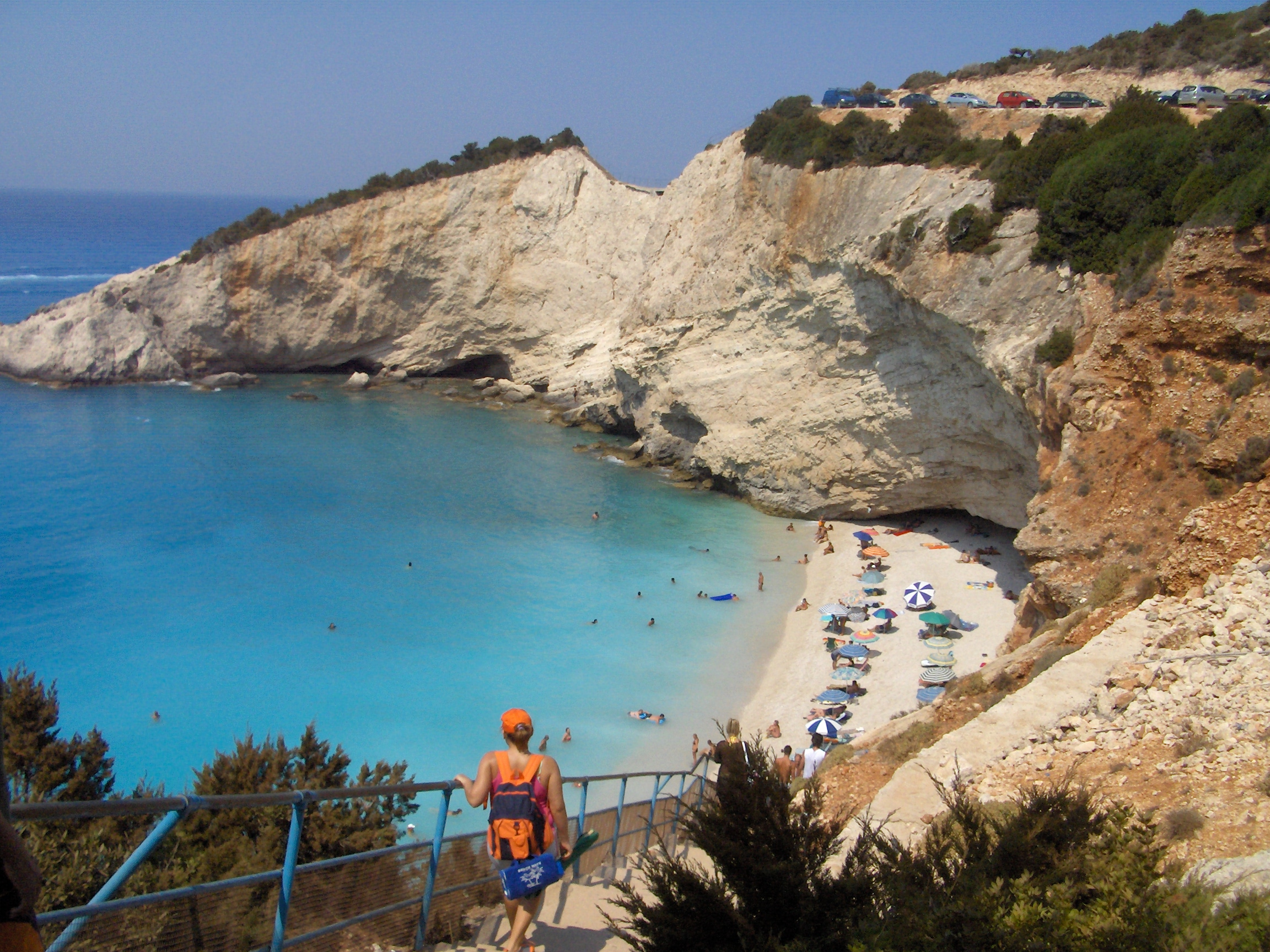
Porto Katsiki beach

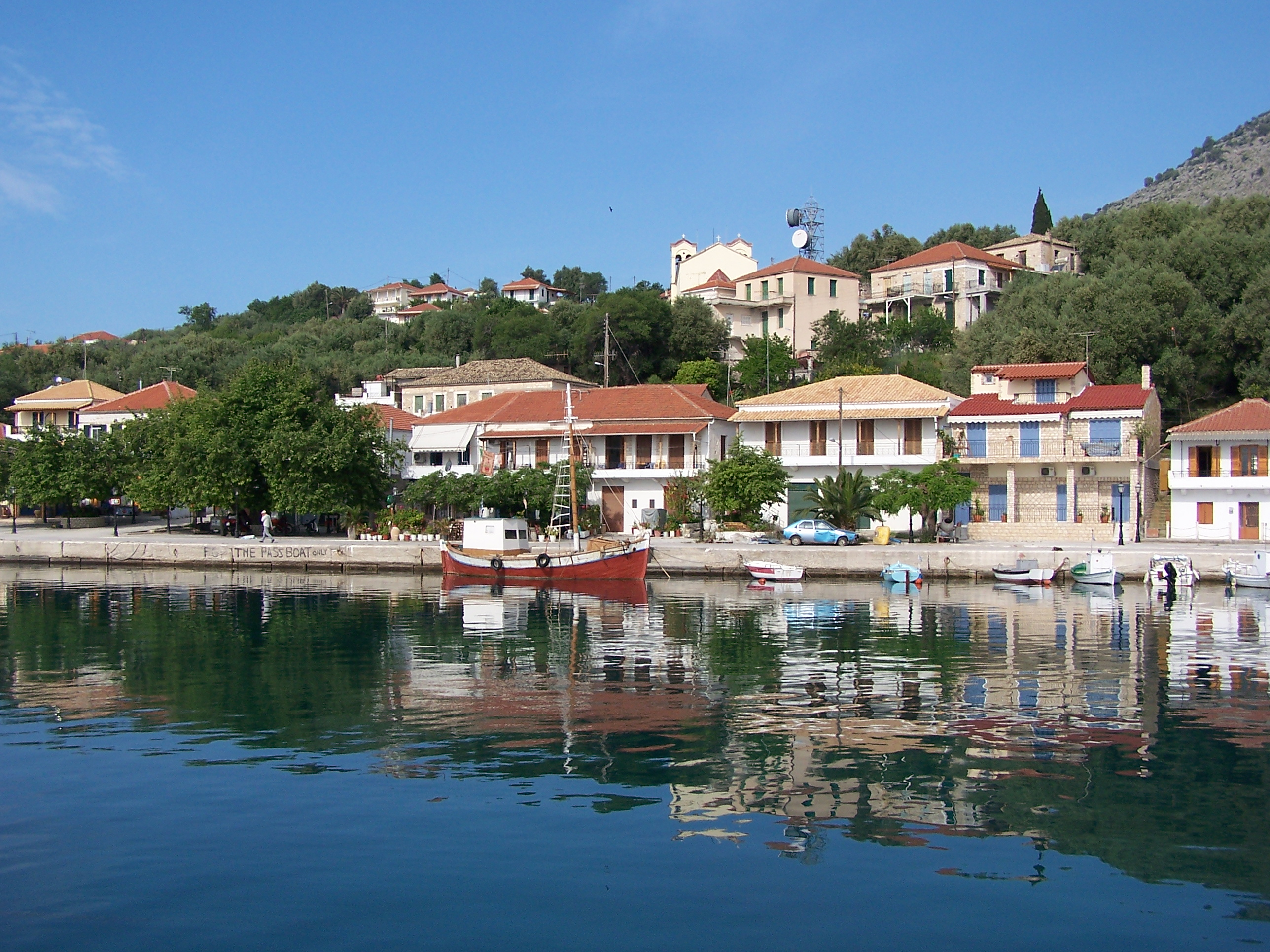
Kalamos village

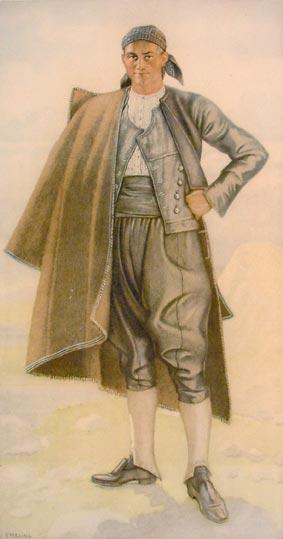
Traditional dress

== See also ==
- Egremni

== Sources ==
- Birken, Andreas [in German] (1976). Die Provinzen des Osmanischen Reiches [The Provinces of the Ottoman Empire]. Beihefte zum Tübinger Atlas des Vorderen Orients, 13 (in German). Reichert. ISBN 3-920153-56-1.
- Brooks, Allan (2013). Castles of Northwest Greece: From the Early Byzantine Period to the Eve of the First World War. Aetos Press. ISBN 978-0-9575846-0-0.
- Fine, John V. A. (1994) [1987]. The Late Medieval Balkans: A Critical Survey from the Late Twelfth Century to the Ottoman Conquest. Ann Arbor, Michigan: University of Michigan Press. ISBN 978-0-472-10079-8.
- Fiedler, Manuel; Hermanns, Marcus Heinrich (2011). "Die hellenistische Brücke über die Meerenge von Leukas (Akarnanien). Die längste Steinbrücke des antiken Griechenlands" [The Hellenistic bridge over the strait of Leukas (Acarnania). The longest stone bridge of ancient Greece]. Archäologie der Brücken. Vorgeschichte, Antike, Mittelalter, Neuzeit. Archaeology of Bridges. Prehistory, Antiquity, Middle Ages, Modern Era. Regensburg: Pustet. pp. 48–52. ISBN 978-3-7917-2331-0.
- Kiel, M. (1986). "Levkas". In Bosworth, C. E.; van Donzel, E.; Lewis, B. & Pellat, Ch. (eds.). The Encyclopaedia of Islam, Second Edition. Volume V: Khe–Mahi. Leiden: E. J. Brill. pp. 725–728. doi:10.1163/1573-3912_islam_SIM_4663. ISBN 978-90-04-07819-2.
- Moschonas, Nikolaos (1975). "Τα Ιόνια Νησιά κατά την περίοδο 1797-1821" [The Ionian Islands in the period 1797-1821]. Ιστορία του Ελληνικού Έθνους, Τόμος ΙΑ′: Ο ελληνισμός υπό ξένη κυριαρχία, 1669–1821 [History of the Greek Nation, Volume XI: Hellenism under foreign rule, 1669–1821] (in Greek). Athens: Ekdotiki Athinon. pp. 382–402.
- Soustal, Peter; Koder, Johannes (1981). Tabula Imperii Byzantini, Band 3: Nikopolis und Kephallēnia (in German). Vienna: Verlag der Österreichischen Akademie der Wissenschaften. ISBN 978-3-7001-0399-8.
- Zečević, Nada (2014). The Tocco of the Greek Realm: Nobility, Power and Migration in Latin Greece (14th-15th centuries). Belgrade: Makart. ISBN 9788691944100.
