= Ionian Islands (region) =

Administrative region of Greece

Ionian Islands Region Περιφέρεια Ιονίων Νήσων
- Administrative region
- Logo

- Coordinates: 38.7°N 20.3°E
- Country: Greece
- Decentralized Administration: Peloponnese, Western Greece and the Ionian
- Capital: Corfu
- Regional units: List: Corfu; Ithaca; Kefalonia; Lefkada; Zakynthos

Government
  - Governor: Giannis Trepeklis (New Democracy (Greece))

Area
  - Total: 2,306.94 km^{2} (890.71 sq mi)

Population (2021)
  - Total: 204,532
  - Density: 88.6594/km^{2} (229.627/sq mi)
- Demonym: Heptanesian

GDP
  - Total: €4.151 billion (2024)
  - Per capita: €20,965 (2024)
- Time zone: UTC+2 (EET)
  - Summer (DST): UTC+3 (EEST)
- ISO 3166 code: GR-F
- HDI (2023): 0.886 very high · 10th of 13
- Website: www.pin.gov.gr

The Ionian Islands Region (/aɪˈoʊniən/ eye-OH-nee-ən; Greek: Περιφέρεια Ιονίων Νήσων, romanized: Periféria Ioníon Níson, [periˈferia ioˈnion ˈnison]) is the smallest by area of the thirteen administrative regions of Greece located in the Ionian Sea. It comprises all the Ionian Islands except Kythera, which, although historically part of the island group, was separated and integrated to the Attica Region.

== Demographics ==
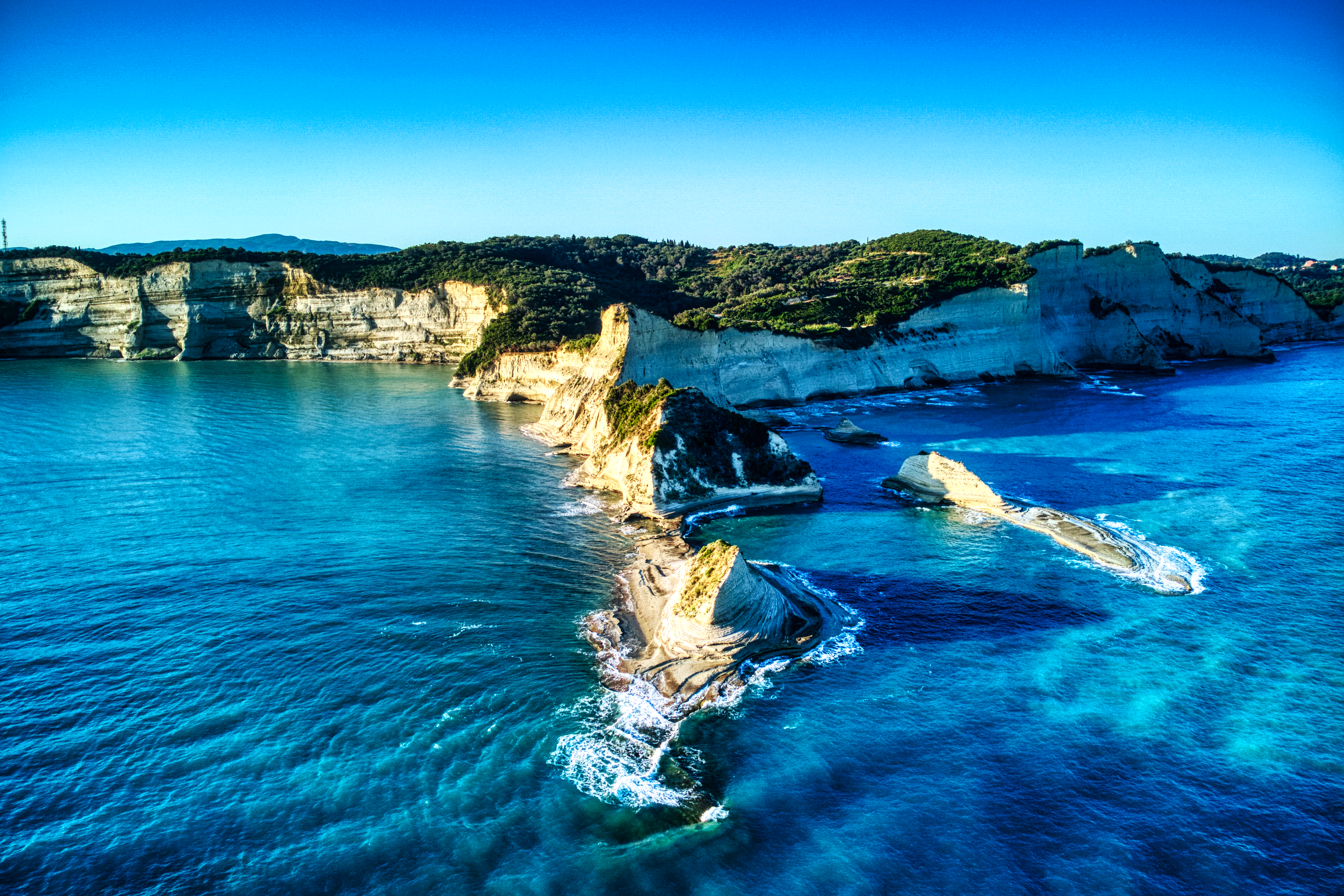
Cape Drastis

The population of the Ionian Islands in 2011 was 207,855, decreased by 1.5% compared to the population in 2001. Nevertheless, the region remains the third by population density with 90.1/km^{2} nationwide, well above the national of 81.96/km^{2}. The most populous of the major islands is Corfu with a population of 104,371, followed by Zante (40,759), Cephalonia (35,801), Leucas (23,693) and Ithaca (3,231). In 2001, the foreign-born population was 19,360 or 9.3%, the majority of which was concentrated in Corfu and Zante. Most of them originate from Albania (13,536). The fertility rate for 2011 according to Eurostat was 1.35 live births per woman.

== Economy ==
The regional gross domestic product for 2010 was 4,029 million euros. The GDP per capita for the same year was 18,440 euros per capita which was lower than the national median of 20,481. However, the GDP per capita of Cephalonia and Zante, 23,275 and 24,616 respectively, was much higher than the national figure. Additionally, unemployment for 2012 was 14.7, the lowest among all Greek regions, and much lower compared to the national unemployment of 24.2.

== Tourism ==
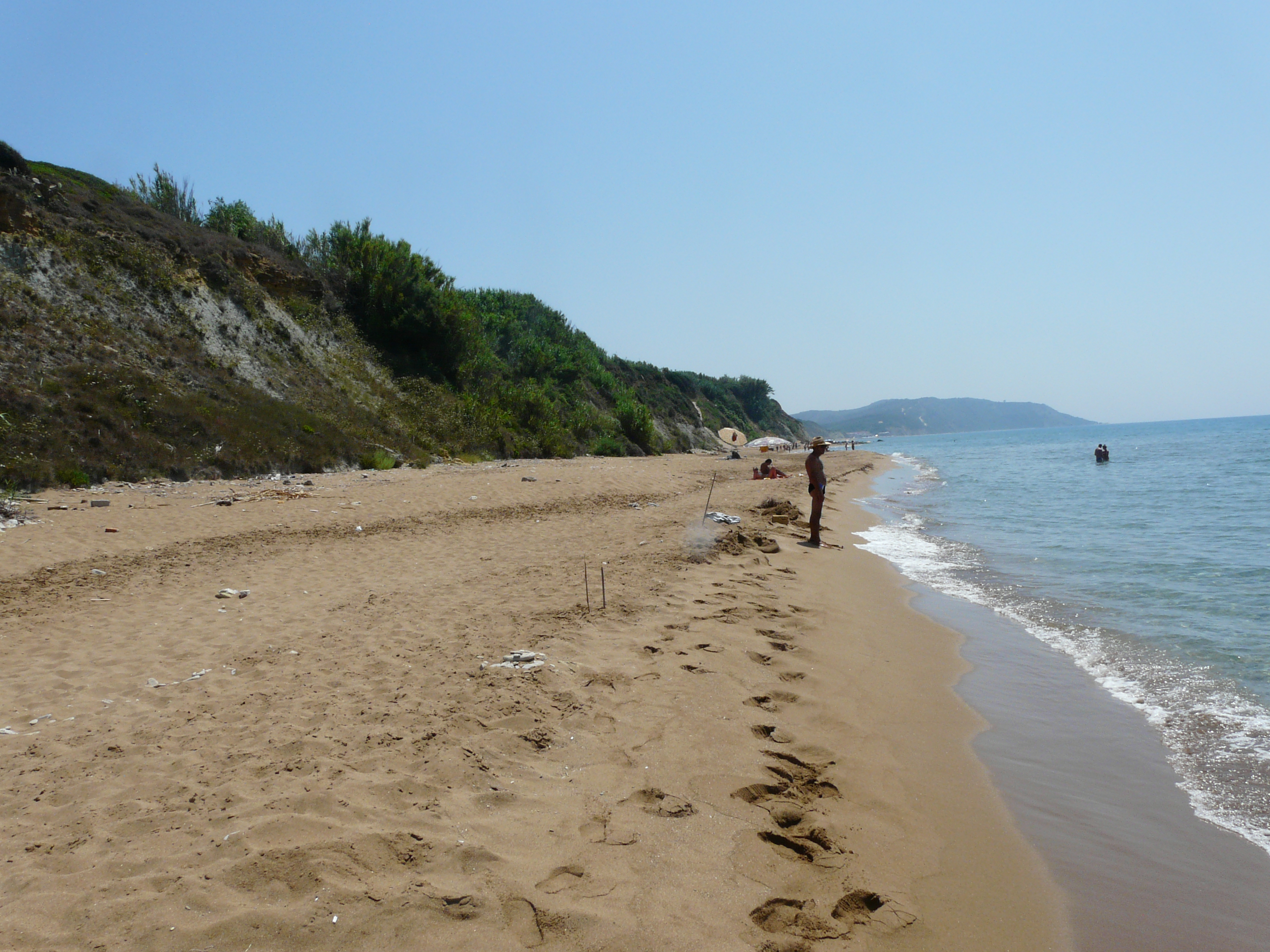
A Corfu beach

The region is a popular tourist destination. The airports of Corfu, Zante and Cephalonia were in the top ten in Greece by number of international arrivals, with 1,386,289 international arrivals for 2012, with Corfu being the sixth airport by number of arrivals nationwide, while Zante and Cephalonia also being in the top ten. Cephalonia Airport had the biggest increase nationwide by 13.11% compared to 2011, while Corfu had an increase of 6.31%.

== Administration ==
The region was established in the 1987 administrative reform, comprising the prefectures of Corfu, Kefalonia and Ithaca, Lefkada and Zakynthos.

With the 2010 Kallikratis plan, its powers and authority were redefined and extended. Along with West Greece and Peloponnese regions, it is supervised by the Decentralized Administration of the Peloponnese, West Greece and the Ionian Islands based at Patras. The region is based at Corfu and is divided into 5 regional units:

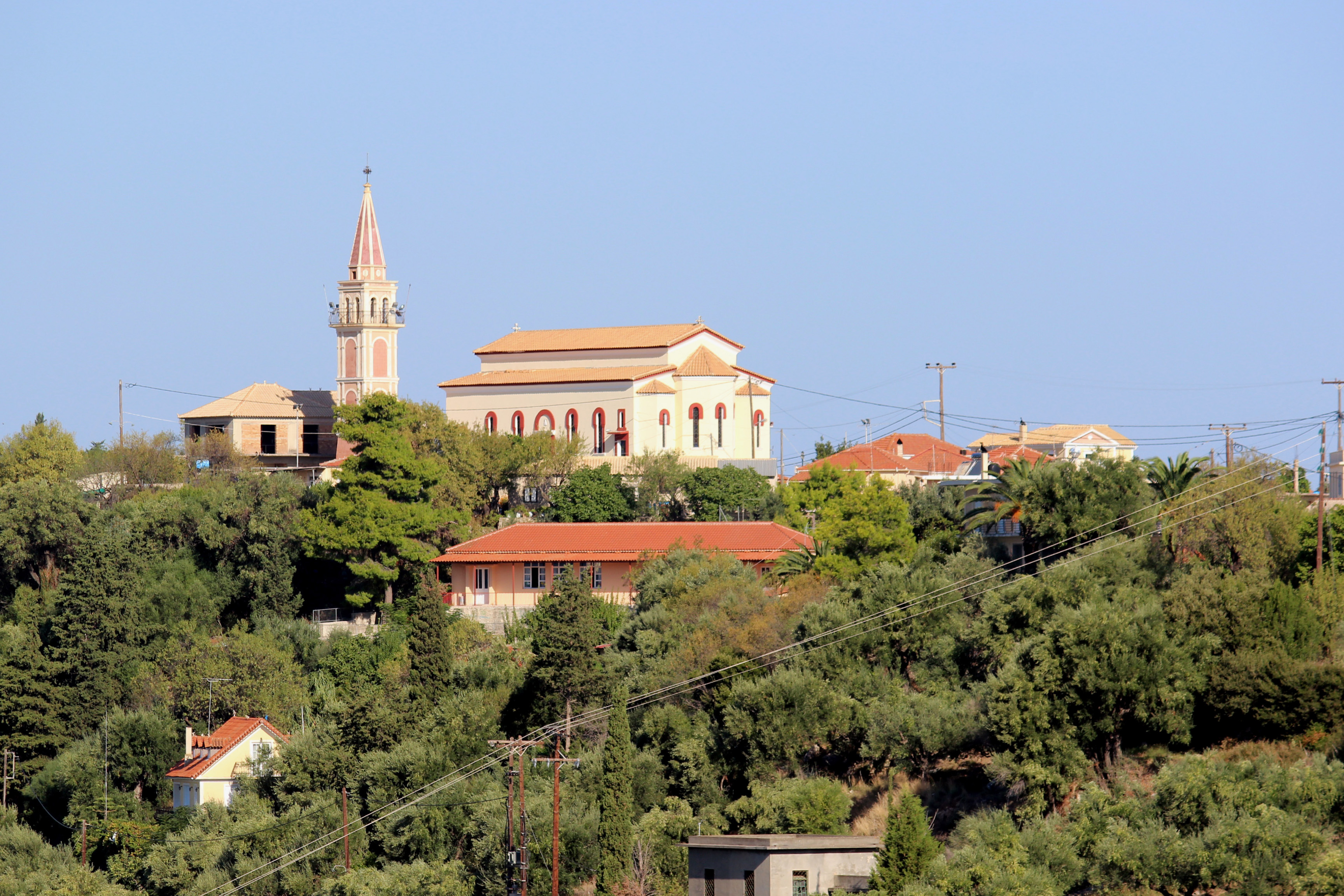
Paraskeví Church, Kipséli, Zakynthos

- Corfu (Kerkyra)
- Ithaca (Ithaki)
- Kefalonia
- Lefkada
- Zakynthos

== Historical population ==
Year	Population	Density
1862	228,631	87.8/km^{2}
1864	229,516	
1879	244,433	106.0/km^{2}
1889	238,783	
1896	282,853	
1907	254,494	
1920	224,189	97.1/km^{2}
1928	213,157	92.4/km^{2}
1940	219,562	95.1/km^{2}
1951	228,597	99.0/km^{2}
1961	207,061	89.7/km^{2}
1971	184,443	
1981	182,651	79.1/km^{2}
1991	193,734	83.9/km^{2}
2001	212,984	92.3/km^{2}
2011	207,855	90/km^{2}
2021	200,726	
