= Mr Wilder & Me =

2020 novel by Jonathan Coe

First edition

Mr Wilder and Me is a novel by Jonathan Coe, published in the UK by Viking Books on 5 November 2020. It is a historical novel set in the late 1970s, and tells the story of Hollywood director Billy Wilder's struggles to write, finance and shoot his penultimate film Fedora, as observed through the eyes of a young Greek interpreter. The novel contains a mixture of real and invented characters.

== Plot ==
Calista Frangopoulou, a 57-year-old, London-based film composer, is facing a crisis in her life, as her offers of work dry up and her daughter Fran struggles with an unwanted pregnancy. The departure of her other daughter Ariane for Australia triggers a reminiscence about the time she left her then family home in Athens to travel round America in 1976.

On that trip, Calista makes friends with a young English woman, Gill Foley. It's been arranged for Gill to have dinner in Los Angeles with an old friend of her father's, the Hollywood director Billy Wilder. She invites Calista to join her, but disappears halfway through the meal, leaving Calista in the company of Wilder, I.A.L. Diamond and their wives. Calista gets drunk and has to crash out at the Wilders' apartment. The next day she leaves them a thank-you note with her parents' name and address.

One year later, she receives a phone call at her parents' apartment, asking her to work for two weeks as interpreter on the set of Wilder's latest film Fedora. She is flown to Corfu, and then to the village of Nydri on the island of Lefkada. In Nydri, as her work comes to an end, she tells Diamond that she doesn't want to return to her parents just yet, and he arranges for her to be taken on as his assistant in Munich, where the film's interiors are to be shot.

In Munich, at a dinner in honour of the film's composer Miklós Rózsa, Calista listens as Wilder confronts a young German diner who is a proponent of holocaust denial. In a fifty-page flashback presented as a screenplay, Wilder recounts his experience of fleeing Nazi Germany in the 1930s, then returning to Germany in 1945 to make Death Mills, his documentary about Nazi atrocities, and to search in vain for his mother and other family members, who he concludes must have died in the death camps.

The production of Fedora moves to Paris, where Calista has long conversations with Wilder's and Diamond's wives, and sleeps with Matthew, a young man whose mother is working on the film. After the shooting wraps, an exhausted Wilder and Diamond drink a brief toast, telling each other that "We made it".

A brief epilogue tells of the unsuccessful release of Fedora, and the resolution of Calista's present-day family crisis.

== Real characters ==
- Billy Wilder: Veteran film director, just turned 70 as the novel begins, co-writer and director of such movies as Double Indemnity, Sunset Boulevard, Some Like It Hot and The Apartment.
- I.A.L. (Iz) Diamond: Wilder's friend and co-screenwriter, with whom he wrote a total of twelve films between 1957 and 1981.
- William Holden: American actor, the star of four Billy Wilder films including Fedora
- Marthe Keller: Swiss actress, star of Fedora
- Al Pacino: American actor, boyfriend of Marthe Keller when Fedora was made
- Audrey Wilder: Billy's second wife
- Barbara Diamond: wife of I.A.L. Diamond
- Miklós Rózsa: Hungarian-born composer, famous for many Hollywood film scores including Quo Vadis, Spellbound and Ben-Hur, who wrote the score for Fedora
- Emeric Pressburger: Hungarian-born screenwriter
- Peter Lorre: Hungarian-American actor
- Friedrich Hollaender: German film composer

=== Invented characters ===
- Calista Frangopoulou: a Greek musician and composer, in her early twenties when the main events of the novel take place, 57 as she looks back and narrates them
- Geoffrey: Calista's husband
- Fran: Calista's daughter (possibly named after Fran Kubelik, the character played by Shirley Maclaine in Wilder's film The Apartment)
- Ariane: Fran's twin sister (possibly named after Ariane Chavasse, the character played by Audrey Hepburn in Wilder's film Love in the Afternoon)
- Matthew: a young man with whom Calista has a fling on the set of Fedora, later a successful film director
- Gill Foley: a young Englishwoman Calista meets while travelling around the US in 1976, and who introduces her to Billy Wilder. The character previously appeared in Coe's novels The Rain Before It Falls and Expo 58 (as 'Baby Gill')
- Thomas Foley: Gill's father. As a young man working for the British Ministry of Information, he assists Wilder during his work in London in 1945. The character previously appeared briefly in Coe's novel The Rain Before It Falls, and is the main character in Expo 58.

== Reception ==
The novel was generally well received. Alex Preston, writing for The Observer, described it, along with Middle England, as being part of the 'renaissance of Jonathan Coe' after some disappointing novels, and concluded that it was "as good as anything he's written". Writing for The Scotsman, Allan Massie described it as "a bittersweet delight with a dark and horrible background", while Mark Lawson in The Guardian wrote that 'Wilder, charismatically wise-cracking but haunted by history, and Diamond, agonised by the lengthy complexity of turning words into pictures, give the book the feel of a real movie memoir.'

== Film Adaptation ==
As of 2022, a film version is in preparation directed by Stephen Frears with the novel being adapted by Christopher Hampton. Wilder will be played by Oscar winner Christoph Waltz, who, like the director, was born in Austria. In February 2024, it was announced that Maya Hawke, John Turturro, and Jon Hamm would join Waltz as Calista, I. A. L. Diamond, and William Holden, respectively.
