= What a Carve Up! =

What a Carve Up! may refer to:

- What a Carve Up! (film), a 1961 film starring Sid James and Kenneth Connor
- What a Carve Up! (2020 film), a 2020 film starring Sharon D. Clarke and Griff Rhys Jones
- What a Carve Up! (novel), a 1994 novel by Jonathan Coe
