= The Terrible Privacy of Maxwell Sim =

2010 novel by Jonathan Coe

- First edition
- Author: Jonathan Coe
- Cover artist: gray318
- Language: English
- Publisher: Penguin Books
- Publication date: 2010
- Publication place: United Kingdom
- English publication date: 27 May 2010
- Media type: Print (hardcover)
- Pages: 339
- ISBN: 978-0-670-91738-9
- Preceded by: The Rain Before It Falls

The Terrible Privacy of Maxwell Sim is the ninth novel by British author Jonathan Coe, first published in the UK on 27 May 2010. It has a picaresque plot, told by the title character in the first person as he journeys first from Australia to his home in Watford, England and then on a promotional race for a toothbrush manufacturer to a remote chemist in the Shetland Islands. The story includes narratives written by other characters that greatly impact on Maxwell Sim, who is also preoccupied and influenced by the life and death of yachtsman Donald Crowhurst.

The book examines identity and isolation, exploring the paradox of loneliness experienced at a time when technology makes connections with other humans easier than ever. Coe has said of his novel that Crowhurst's “story is retold as a parable of loneliness, exploring how post-1968 advances in technology might only have increased our sense of isolation.”

In The Independent's Robert Epstein commented "it takes real panache to write with such flowing comedic ease; his pacing throughout is superb and delivers realistic dialogue and, hence, believable characters". Writing in The Observer the critic Jeremy Paxman wrote that Coe had "noticed something interesting about modern Britain, and fashioned an engaging parable from it".

The Very Private Life of Mister Sim, a French film based on the novel, directed by Michel Leclerc and produced by Delante Films and Karé Productions, was released on 16 December 2015.
