= Valaoritis =

Valaoritis (Greek: Βαλαωρίτης) is a surname. Notable people with the surname include:

- Aristotelis Valaoritis (1824–1879), Greek poet and politician, great-grandfather of Nanos
- Nanos Valaoritis (1921–2019), Greek poet, novelist, and playwright
