= Félix Moati =

French actor, director and screenwriter

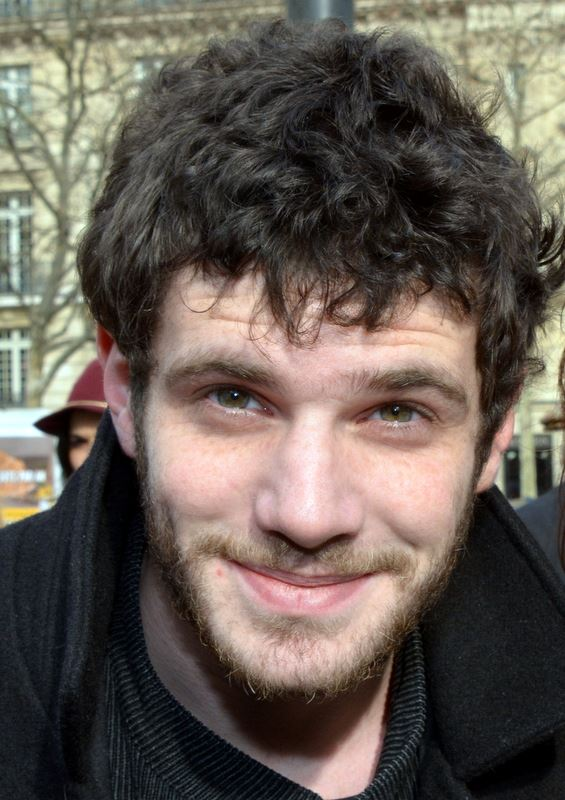
- Félix Moati in 2016
- Born: 24 May 1990 (age 35); Paris, France
- Occupations: Actor, film director, screenwriter
- Years active: 1996–present

Félix Moati (born 24 May 1990) is a French actor, film director and screenwriter. He is the son of the journalist and filmmaker Serge Moati.

He was nominated for Most Promising Actor at the 2013 and 2016 César.

== Filmography ==
=== As actor ===
Year	Title	Role	Director	Notes
1996	Tendre piège		Serge Moati	TV movie
2008	LOL (Laughing Out Loud)	Arthur	Lisa Azuelos	
2009	Les incroyables aventures de Fusion Man	Raphael	Xavier Gens & Marius Vale	Short
2009	Rech JF : pour court-métrage rémunéré	The young man	Manuel Schapira	Short
2009	Sweet Dream	Julien	Jean-Philippe Amar	TV series (1 episode)
2010	Depuis demain	Félix	Simon Lahmani	Short
2011	Livid	William	Julien Maury and Alexandre Bustillo	
2012	Pirate TV	Victor	Michel Leclerc	Cabourg Romantic Film Festival - Best Male Revelation; Nominated - César Award for Most Promising Actor
2014	Hippocrate	Stéphane	Thomas Lilti	
2014	Valentin Valentin	Romain	Pascal Thomas	
2014	Libre et assoupi	Bruno	Benjamin Guedj	Alpe d'Huez International Comedy Film Festival - Best Acting
2014	Gaby Baby Doll	Vincent	Sophie Letourneur	
2015	All About Them	Micha	Jérôme Bonnell	Nominated - César Award for Most Promising Actor; Nominated - Lumière Award for Best Male Revelation
2015	The Very Private Life of Mister Sim	Francis	Michel Leclerc (2)	
2015	Langue noire	Erwan	Victor Boyer	Short
2015	Bête noire	Nicolas	Stéphanie Carreras & Philippe Pujo	Short
2016	Irreplaceable	Vincent Werner	Thomas Lilti (2)	
2016	L'enfance d'un chef	Félix	Antoine de Bary	Short
2016	Petit homme	Léo	Nathanaël Guedj	Short
2017	Some Like It Veiled	Armand	Sou Abadi	
2018	Gaspard va au mariage	Gaspard	Antony Cordier	
2018	Simon et Théodore	Simon	Mikael Buch	
2020	Resistance	Alain	Jonathan Jakubowicz	
2021	The French Dispatch	Head Caterer	Wes Anderson	
2023	Voleuses (Wingwomen)	Clarence	Mélanie Laurent	
2024	Close to the Sultan (Dans la chambre du sultan)	Gabriel Veyre		
2025	Two Women (Deux femmes en or)		Chloé Robichaud	

=== As filmmaker ===
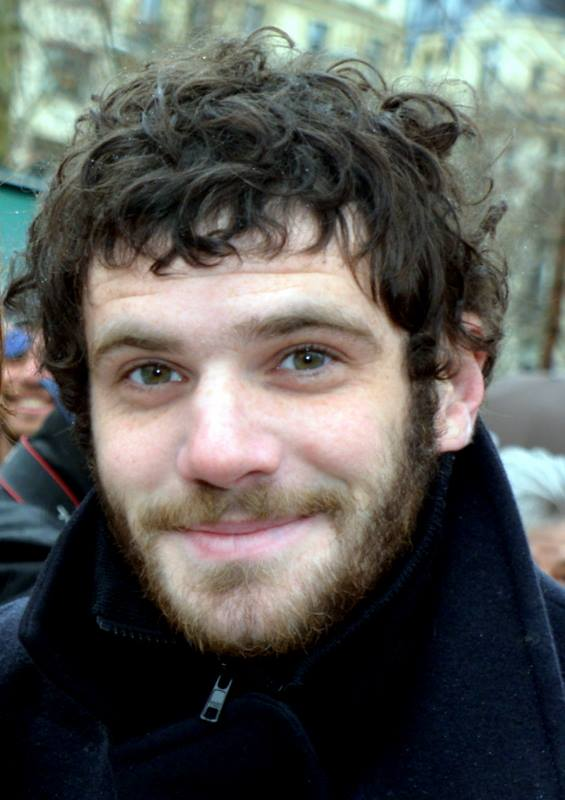
Félix Moati at the lunch for the 42nd César Awards, in 2017

Year	Title	Credited as		Notes
Year	Title	Director	Screenwriter	Notes
2016	Après Suzanne	Yes	Yes	Short; Nominated - Cannes Film Festival - Short Film Palme d'Or; Nominated - César Award for Best Short Film
