= Middle England (novel) =

2018 novel by Jonathan Coe

- First edition cover
- Author: Jonathan Coe
- Language: English
- Genre: Literary fiction
- Publisher: Viking Press
- Publication date: 8 November 2018
- Publication place: United Kingdom
- Pages: 423pp
- ISBN: 978-0-241-30946-9
- Preceded by: Number 11

Middle England is a 2018 novel by Jonathan Coe. It is the third novel in a trilogy, following The Rotters’ Club (2001) and The Closed Circle (2004). The novel explores the experiences of characters from those earlier novels against the backdrop of the major events taking place before, during and after the Brexit referendum.

== Characters ==
- Benjamin Trotter: At the start of the novel, Benjamin is happily divorced from Cicely and lives in semi-retirement in Shropshire, having become fairly wealthy in London prior to the housing crisis. Since the events of The Closed Circle, he no longer speaks to his brother Paul.
- Colin Trotter: After the death of his wife Sheila, Colin moves in with his son Benjamin. During the course of the novel, he begins to experience the psychological effects of old age.
- Lois Potter (née Trotter): Lois continues to experience trauma as a result of the Birmingham pub bombings, where her then-boyfriend was killed shortly after proposing to her in The Rotters' Club. She lives separately from her husband Christopher and isn't in love with him, but cannot bring herself to admit this.
- Christopher Potter: Despite being married to Lois, Christopher lives separately from his wife and is happy when he discovers that his daughter, Sophie, temporarily moves in with him.
- Sophie Potter: Near the beginning of the novel, Sophie has to attend a driving safety class as a result of being caught speeding, and she falls in love with Ian, one of the instructors. She works as a lecturer in art history.
- Ian: Ian is a driving safety instructor. He meets Sophie at one of his classes and eventually becomes her husband.
- Helena: Helena is Ian's mother. Her political views become a point of tension with Sophie and, to a lesser extent, Ian. She is Eurosceptic and anti-immigration, at one point showing solidarity with the views expressed by Enoch Powell in his Rivers of Blood speech.
- Doug Anderton: Doug is a left-wing journalist who primarily writes op-eds for The Guardian and other publications. Despite growing up in a staunchly socialist family, Doug is married to an heiress and lives in Chelsea. He attended school with Benjamin and Philip in the 1970s.
- Philip Chase: Benjamin and Doug's friend from secondary school. In Middle England, Philip runs his own publishing house, creating artbooks that contain archival images of British towns and cities. He offers to help Benjamin edit and publish his novel.
- Claire Newman: Ex-wife of Philip. Claire attended King William's sixth form with Benjamin, Doug and Philip, and she continues to keep in contact with them.
- Charlie Chappell: Benjamin's childhood friend. Although he attended a different secondary school to Benjamin, they rekindle their friendship as adults. Charlie works as a children's entertainer, performing as a clown.
- Ronald Culpepper: Culpepper was in the same year as Benjamin, Doug and Philip at King William's School. At the time, he expressed racist views towards a black classmate of theirs; by the time of the novel, he has become the leader of a group called Imperium, a right-wing think tank focused on English nationalism.
- Sohan: Sophie's Sri Lankan colleague. After same sex couples are given the right to get married in the UK, Sophie attends the wedding of Sohan and his partner.

Other characters from Coe's previous works appear in the novel including author Lionel Hampshire and his assistant Hermione (from his short story "Canadians Can't Flirt", collected in Tales from a Master’s Notebook), while characters from The Rotters’ Club and The Closed Circle, such as Cicely Boyd and Paul Trotter, are mentioned in passing.

== Development ==
In an author's note at the end of the novel, Coe states that there were two main inspirations behind his desire to revisit the characters from his earlier novels. After an interview with the novelist Alice Adams, in which she praised The Closed Circle, he entered into a correspondence with her, and “her enthusiasm” persuaded him that he “should revisit these abandoned characters”. In addition, after seeing Richard Cameron's theatrical adaptation of The Rotters’ Club, he became aware of the importance of Benjamin and Lois's relationship to the series of novels, and felt the desire to explore it further. In addition, Coe states that the character of Emily Shamma is named after a woman who made the winning bid to have a character in Coe's next novel named after her at an auction for the charity Freedom from Torture. Coe incorporated information about the origin of Shamma's name into the novel.

In an article he wrote for The Guardian a few days before the publication of the novel, the author stated that he “wanted to convey a strong and specific sense of the texture of English public life in the last eight years”. Although he had many doubts about whether or not this would affect the longevity of the novel, he ultimately concluded that it was important for novelists to focus on contemporary events, since their works become “vital resources in trying to understand what happened”.

== Reception ==
Alex Preston, writing for The Guardian, felt that Coe's use of characters spanning multiple generations, covering almost a decade in British history, made him “the first author to address our current crisis of national identity using the form that feels most suited to the task”, contrasting the novelist's work with contemporaneous efforts by Ali Smith and Amanda Craig. In The Irish Times, John Boyne ended his review by saying: “Millions of words have been and will be written on Brexit but few will get to the heart of why it is happening as incisively as Middle England.” A number of reviewers compared Coe's series of novels to the works of Anthony Powell, with Ian Sansom calling it “the closest thing we have to a contemporary middle-class, middle-England Dance to the Music of Time”.

Both Preston and Sam Leith, however, felt that the novel's closeness to contemporary events created flaws in the narrative, with the former saying the ending felt “slightly cobbled together”, while the latter described the novel as a whole as “less than completely successful” in its attempt to depict the state of the nation. Some reviewers questioned how relevant the more overtly political aspects of the novel would be outside the time of its publication, with Leith saying that “certain passages of exposition feel clunky” as a result of Coe's attempt to explain topics like the rise of European populism or the Kalergi plan conspiracy theory.

Regarding Coe's political stance, Leith felt that it was a “great big Centrist Dad of a novel” that only asks the reader to sympathise with people who voted Remain in the Brexit referendum. In his review for Prospect, Ian Sansom called it a “brilliant Brexit novel”, but noted that “everyone who votes for Brexit in the novel [...] is portrayed as either mildly or explicitly racist, and at least a little bit stupid.” By comparison, Jonathan Derbyshire of the Financial Times noted that Coe's writing was interesting for its “ambivalent embrace” of Englishness despite the author's professed Eurocentrism, while Allan Massie in The Scotsman praised the author for showing “abundant sympathy for his characters” and recognizing that “much of the anger at political correctness and the resentment of people who feel no longer at home in their own country [isn’t] unjustified.”

Many critics praised the quality of Coe's prose, plotting, characterization and humour. Leith called it “as smoothly accomplished as ever” and praised the humour of the author's set pieces. In his review for The Spectator, Jon Day commended Coe's “slick and precise” prose, along with the author's skill in handling transitions between scenes. However, he felt that while the novelist writes “compelling, humane and funny novels”, the lack of experimentation in his otherwise pleasurable style “confirms rather than challenges” the reader's prejudices. By comparison, Mark Lawson, writing for Literary Review, felt that Coe had evolved from a more experimental mode to a “low-key prose” style with a “talent for characterisation and captivating narrative”, and that this transformation is echoed in the scene in the novel where “Benjamin’s vast postmodern masterwork becomes, during an editing session, a conventional novella” that goes on to be nominated for the Booker Prize.
