= Madouri =

Greek islet in the Ionian Sea

Native name: Μαδουρή
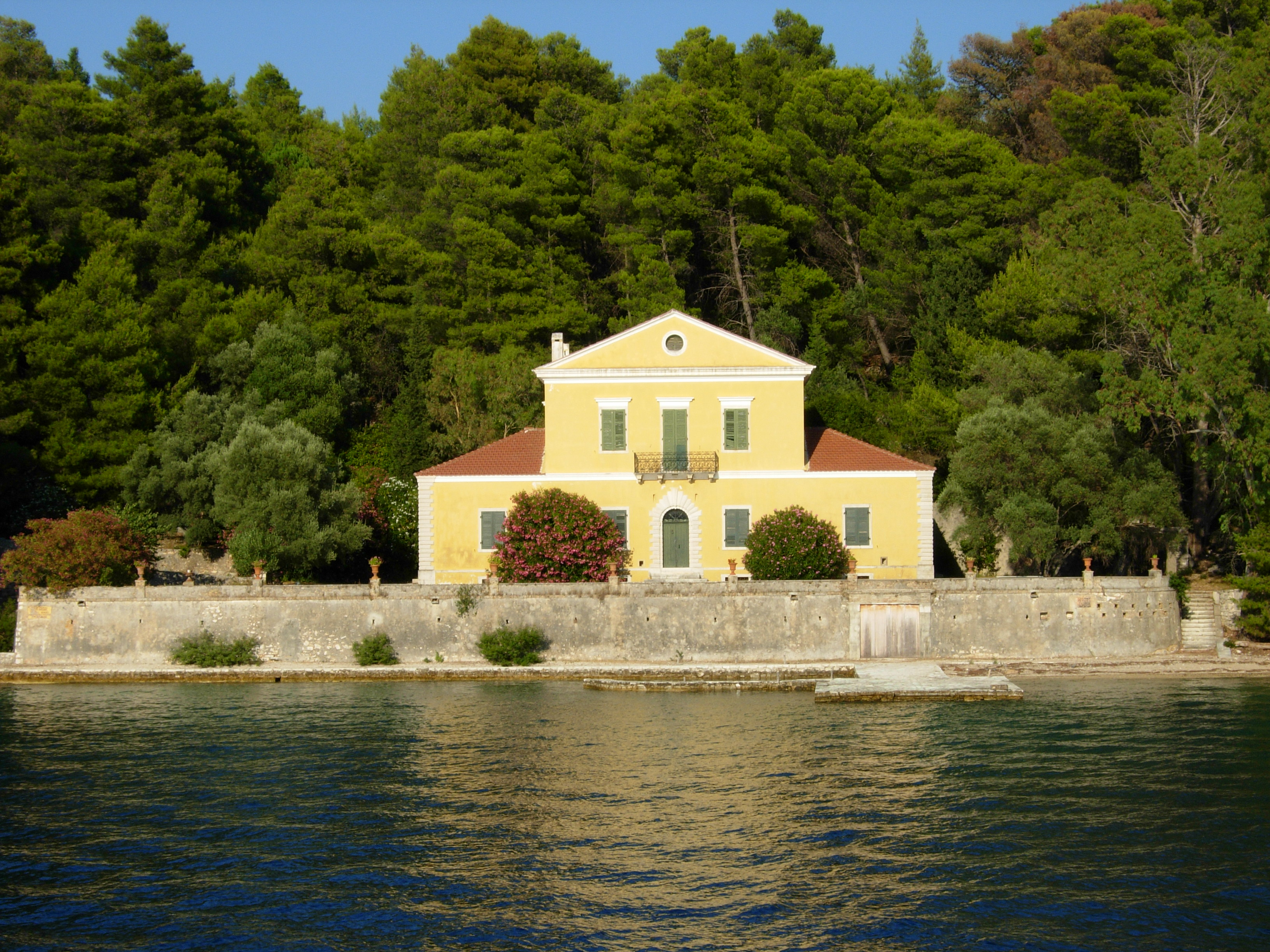
- The mansion on the island of Madouri was the home of the 19th-century poet Aristotelis Valaoritis.

- Location within Greece

Geography
- Location: Ionian Sea
- Coordinates: 38°42′25″N 20°43′30″E
- Archipelago: Ionian Islands

Administration
- Greece
- Region: Ionian Islands
- Municipality: Lefkada

Demographics
- Population: 0

Madouri (Greek: Μαδουρή) is a small uninhabited island in the Ionian Sea, near Lefkada, Greece. It is part of the municipal unit Ellomenos. Madouri lies 700 m from the east coast of the island Lefkada, opposite the town Nydri. The island is heavily forested. It is about 400 metres (1,312 feet) in diameter.

This privately owned island is in the possession of the Valaoritis family. It was the place where Aristotelis Valaoritis, a 19th-century poet, grew up. The last owner was the writer Nanos Valaoritis. The villa was the principal location in Billy Wilder's 1978 film, Fedora.
