= Jonathan Coe =

English novelist

Jonathan Coe FRSL
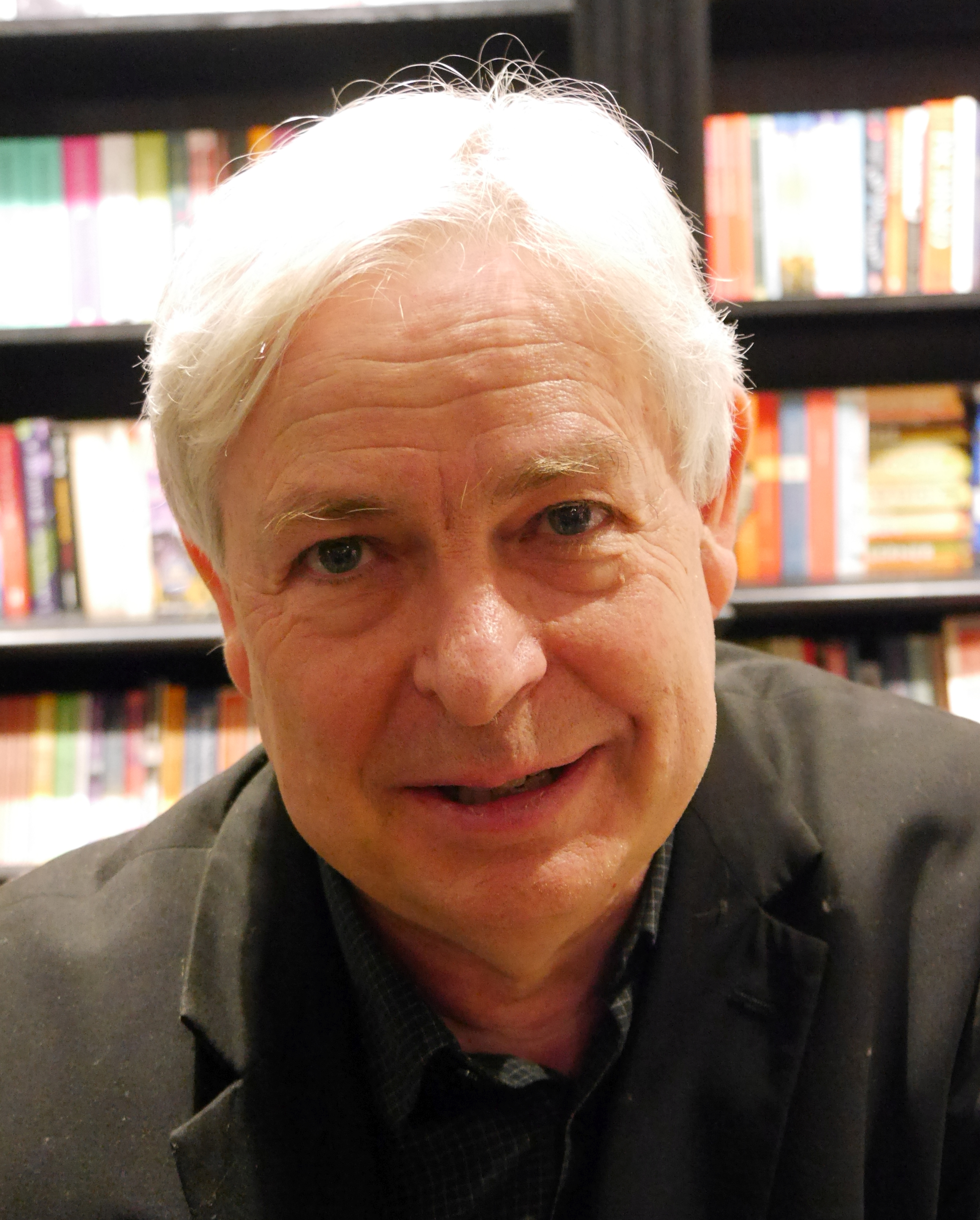
- Coe at Hatchards London in 2022
- Born: 19 August 1961 (age 65); Bromsgrove, Worcestershire, England
- Occupation: Novelist
- Writing career
- Period: 1987–present
- Genre: Satire
- Notable works: What a Carve Up! (1994); The House of Sleep (1997); The Rotters' Club (2001); Middle England (2019)
- Notable awards: John Llewellyn Rhys Prize; Samuel Johnson Prize; Prix Médicis; Bollinger Everyman Wodehouse Prize; Costa Book Award
- Website: jonathancoewriter.com

Jonathan Coe (/koʊ/; born 19 August 1961) is an English novelist and writer. His work has an underlying preoccupation with political issues, although this serious engagement is often expressed comically in the form of satire. For example, What a Carve Up! (1994) reworks the plot of an old 1960s spoof horror film of the same name. It is set within the "carve up" of the UK's resources that was carried out by Margaret Thatcher's Conservative governments of the 1980s.

== Early life ==
Coe was born in Bromsgrove, Worcestershire, on 19 August 1961 to Roger and Janet (née Kay) Coe. He studied at King Edward's School, Birmingham, and Trinity College, Cambridge. He taught at the University of Warwick, where he completed an MA and PhD in English Literature.

== Career ==
Coe has long been interested in both music and literature. In the mid-1980s he played with a band (The Peer Group) and tried to get a recording of his music. He also wrote songs and played keyboards for a short-lived feminist cabaret group, Wanda and the Willy Warmers.

He published his first novel, The Accidental Woman, in 1987. In 1994 his fourth novel What a Carve Up! won the John Llewellyn Rhys Prize, and the Prix du Meilleur Livre Étranger in France. It was followed by The House of Sleep, which won the Writers' Guild of Great Britain Best Novel award and, in France, the Prix Médicis. As of 2022, Coe has published fourteen novels.

Besides novels, Coe has written a biography of the experimental British novelist B. S. Johnson, Like a Fiery Elephant, which D. J. Taylor described in Literary Review as "a deeply unconventional biography," won the Samuel Johnson Prize in 2005. Also in 2005 Penguin published his "collected shorter prose", a volume consisting of only 55 pages, under the title 9th & 13th. The same collection was published in France in 2012 under the title Désaccords imparfaits.

He has written a short children's adaptation of Gulliver's Travels by Jonathan Swift, and a children's story called The Broken Mirror. Both titles are published in Italy only, as La storia di Gulliver (2011) and Lo specchio dei desideri (2012).

A handwritten manuscript page from The Rotters' Club was displayed as part of the "Writing Britain: Wastelands to Wonderlands" exhibition that ran at the British Library during 2012.

Coe was a judge for the Booker Prize in 1996 and has been a jury member at the Venice Film Festival (in 1999, under the chairmanship of Emir Kusturica) and the Edinburgh Film Festival in 2007.

In 2012 Coe was invited by Javier Marías to become a duke of the kingdom of Redonda. He chose as his title "Duke of Prunes", after a favourite piece of music by Frank Zappa.

Coe read an excerpt of The Terrible Privacy of Maxwell Sim to crowds at the Latitude Festival in July 2009. The central character was to be "a product of the social media boom", and "the sort of person with hundreds of Facebook friends but no one to talk to when his marriage breaks up."

Coe's 2019 book Middle England won the European Book Prize and also won the Costa Book Award in the Novel category.

== Film and TV adaptations ==
Both What a Carve Up! (1994) and The Rotters' Club (2001) have been adapted as drama serials for BBC Radio 4. What a Carve Up! was adapted by David Nobbs. The Rotters' Club was adapted for television by Dick Clement and Ian La Frenais and broadcast on BBC Two in January–February 2005. The Dwarves of Death (1990) was filmed as Five Seconds to Spare in 1999, for which Coe himself co-wrote the screenplay.

The Very Private Life of Mister Sim, a French film based on The Terrible Privacy of Maxwell Sim, directed by Michel Leclerc and produced by Delante Cinema and Kare Productions, was released on 16 December 2015.

== Musical collaborations ==
Music is a constant thread in Coe's work. He played music for years and tried to find a record label as a performer before becoming a published novelist. He had to wait until 2001 to make his first appearance on a record with 9th & 13th (Tricatel, 2001), a collection of readings of his work, set to music by jazz pianist/double bass player Danny Manners and indiepop artist Louis Philippe.

Coe is a lifelong fan of Canterbury progressive rock. His novel The Rotters' Club is named after an album by Hatfield and the North. He has contributed to the liner notes for that band's archival release Hatwise Choice. He once said: "I'd love to find a pianist to collaborate with – maybe Alex Maguire, who is now playing with the reformed line-up of Hatfield and the North". In fact, this collaboration did come to fruition, at the Cheltenham Literature Festival in 2009, where Maguire performed a suite of piano pieces to accompany readings from the novel The Rain Before It Falls. Coe has also performed live with flautist Theo Travis.

Coe wrote the sleevenotes "Reflections on The High Llamas" for the 2003 compilation of The High Llamas Retrospective, Rarities and Instrumentals. He has also written lyrics for songs on the albums My Favourite Part of You and The Wonder of It All by Louis Philippe, and Earth to Ether by Theo Travis, for which the vocalist was Richard Sinclair.

In 2008 Coe wrote Say Hi to the Rivers and the Mountains, a 60-minute piece of what he calls "spoken musical theatre", with dialogue to be delivered continuously by three actors over a sequence of songs and instrumentals by The High Llamas. The work was premiered at the Analog Festival in Dublin that summer, and subsequently performed at various venues in the UK and Spain. The most recent performance was as part of the Notes and Letters Festival at Kings Place in London in September 2011, with Henry Goodman in the leading role of Bobby. The piece is inspired by the proposed demolition of Robin Hood Gardens, an East London council estate designed by Alison and Peter Smithson.

In March 2011, at the City Winery in New York, Coe took the keyboard solos on a live version of "Nigel Blows A Tune" from the Caravan album In the Land of Grey and Pink, along with the musician/novelist Wesley Stace and his band The English UK.

Coe's 2026 novel Lessons in Harmony explores the relationship between Maurice Ravel and Ralph Vaughan Williams, who spent three months together in 1908 in a master-pupil relationship, leading to a warm friendship over the following decade.

== Personal life ==
Coe married Janine McKeown in 1989, and they have two daughters born in 1997 and 2000.

In 2009, Coe took part in Oxfam's first annual book festival, "Bookfest". Along with William Sutcliffe, Coe volunteered for the Oxfam Bloomsbury Bookshop in London on Thursday 9 July. Coe and Sutcliffe were each asked to choose a theme, and to find books from the stockroom to set up in the shop's window. Coe chose satire as the theme for his display. He chose books by or about Michael Moore, Bill Hicks, Peter Cook and Steve Bell. He also unearthed a script of Terry Gilliam’s film Brazil.

Coe donated a story to Oxfam's "Ox-Tales" project, four collections of UK stories written by 38 authors. Coe's story was published in the Earth collection.

He is a trustee of the charity Cleared Ground Demining, and in spring 2007 visited Guinea-Bissau to write an article about their operations there.

In a 2001 newspaper interview, Coe described himself as an atheist.

== Honours and awards ==
Literary prizes

- 1994 : John Llewellyn Rhys Prize — for What a Carve Up!
- 1995 : Prix du Meilleur Livre Étranger — for What a Carve Up!
- 1997 : Writers' Guild of Great Britain Award for Best Fiction Book — for The House of Sleep
- 1998 : Prix Médicis étranger — for The House of Sleep
- 2001 : Bollinger Everyman Wodehouse Prize — for The Rotters' Club
- 2004 : Premio Literario Arcebispo Juan de San Clemente — for The Rotters' Club
- 2005 : Samuel Johnson Prize — for Like a Fiery Elephant
- 2019 : European Book Prize — for Middle England
- 2019 : Costa Book Award for Novel — for Middle England
- 2019 : Bauer Ca' Foscari Award at the Incroci di civiltà Festival — for the ensemble of his work

Learned offices

- 2004 : Chevalier of the Ordre des Arts et des Lettres
- 2012 : Fellow of the Royal Society of Literature

Honorary degrees

- 2006 : DLitt, University of Birmingham
- 2006 : DLitt, University of Wolverhampton
- DUniv : Birmingham City University

== Bibliography ==
=== Novels ===
- The Accidental Woman, Duckworth, 1987
- A Touch of Love, Duckworth, 1989
- The Dwarves of Death, Fourth Estate, 1990
- What a Carve Up!, Viking, 1994 — winner of the John Llewellyn Rhys Prize; published in the U.S. as The Winshaw Legacy
- The House of Sleep, Viking, 1997 — winner of the Prix Médicis étranger
- The Rotters' Club, Viking, 2001 — winner of the Bollinger Everyman Wodehouse Prize
- The Closed Circle, Viking, 2004
- The Rain Before It Falls, Viking, 2007
- The Terrible Privacy of Maxwell Sim, Viking, 2010
- Expo 58, Viking, 2013
- Number 11, Viking, 2015
- Middle England, Viking, 2018
- Mr Wilder and Me, Viking, 2020
- Bournville, Viking, 2022
- The Proof of My Innocence, Viking, 2024
- Lessons in Harmony, Viking, 2026

=== Books for children ===
- La storia di Gulliver, L'espresso 2011
- Lo specchio dei desideri, Feltrinelli 2012

=== Non-fiction ===
- Humphrey Bogart: Take It and Like It, London: Bloomsbury, 1991
- James Stewart: Leading Man, London: Bloomsbury, 1994
- Like a Fiery Elephant: The Story of B. S. Johnson, London: Picador, 2004 — winner of the Samuel Johnson Prize for non-fiction
