= The Closed Circle (novel) =

2004 novel by Jonathan Coe

- First edition
- Author: Jonathan Coe
- Language: English
- Publisher: Viking Press
- Publication date: 2 September 2004
- Publication place: United Kingdom
- Media type: Print (hardcover, paperback)
- Pages: 432
- ISBN: 0-670-89254-8
- Preceded by: The Rotters' Club
- Followed by: The Rain Before It Falls

The Closed Circle is a 2004 novel by British author Jonathan Coe, and is the sequel to his 2001 novel The Rotters' Club. We re-encounter the main characters from The Rotters' Club - Benjamin Trotter, Doug Anderton and Philip Chase, and also become better-acquainted with some of the more minor characters, most notably Paul Trotter, Benjamin's younger brother, and Claire Newman, an old school friend of the boys.

== Characters ==
- Paul Trotter: Paul is a Labour MP, so keen to ingratiate himself with Prime Minister Tony Blair that he named his first child Antonia. However, he battles with his politics internally, and is unsure whether to vote for or against the Iraq War. Although keen to climb the political ladder, he is a deeply flawed, weak man, and attempts to seduce Malvina, his 'media advisor'.
- Benjamin Trotter: Benjamin has not come a long way from the introverted boy we met in The Rotters' Club. He and his wife Emily are unhappily unable to conceive and as their marriage deteriorates, the only thing they have in common is their Christian faith, although during the course of the novel his faith is shaken. Not only is Benjamin still working on his great book, a fusion of music and the written word, he is also yet to forget about Cicely Boyd, his first love.
- Doug Anderton: Now living in Chelsea, London, Doug writes for a broadsheet newspaper and lives with his wife and young children. He is passionate about politics, persuading his editor to allow him to write a piece about the Longbridge plant in the midst of the factory's closure. Doug involves himself in the developing relationship between Paul and Malvina, but is powerless to stop the events that take place.
- Philip Chase: Like Doug, Philip is now a journalist, although not for a national newspaper, but the Birmingham Post. Although he eventually married Claire Newman, they later divorced, and he is now remarried to a woman named Carol. He and Claire had one son together, Patrick, who has lived with Philip since Claire went to live in Italy. Philip is compelled to investigate racism in Britain after an old school friend, Steve Richards, contacts him to say he is being sent abuse through the post.
- Claire Newman: Claire returns from Italy at the beginning of the novel following a failed love affair, and tries to re-establish a relationship with her son, Patrick. Despite initial resistance, Claire agrees to reawaken the past and try to solve the mystery of her sister Miriam's disappearance after some persuasion by Patrick.
