= Pirate TV (film) =

- Film poster
- French: Télé gaucho
- Directed by: Michel Leclerc
- Written by: Michel Leclerc; Thomas Lilti
- Produced by: Emmanuel Barraux; Agnès Vallée; Genevieve Lemal
- Starring: Félix Moati; Éric Elmosnino; Sara Forestier; Maïwenn; Emmanuelle Béart; Zinedine Soualem; Samir Guesmi
- Cinematography: Guillaume Deffontaines
- Edited by: Annette Dutertre
- Music by: Jérôme Bensoussan
- Production companies: 31 Juin Films; Scope Pictures
- Distributed by: UGC Distribution
- Release date: 12 December 2012
- Running time: 108 minutes
- Country: France
- Language: French
- Budget: $4.6 million
- Box office: $662.986

Pirate TV (French: Télé gaucho) is a 2012 French comedy film directed by Michel Leclerc.

== Plot ==
Life of a local independent TV in the 1990s in France run by Jean Lou, Yasmina, Stephen and Adonis, anarchists and provocateurs of the first hour, ready to make revolution.

== Cast ==
- Félix Moati as Victor
- Éric Elmosnino as Jean-Lou
- Sara Forestier as Clara
- Maïwenn as Yasmina
- Emmanuelle Béart as Patricia Gabriel
- Yannick Choirat as Étienne
- Zinedine Soualem as Jimmy
- Samir Guesmi as Bébé
- François-Éric Gendron as Victor's father
- Christiane Millet as Victor's mother
- Lionel Girard as Adonis
- Anne Benoît as Madame Serrano
- Carla Besnaïnou as Justine
- Aristide Demonico as Poliakov
- Flora Tonnelier as Flora
- Franc Bruneau as Juan
- Laurent Firode as A protester

== Accolades ==
Award	Category	Recipient	Result
Cabourg Film Festival	Best Male Revelation	Félix Moati	Won
César Award	César Award for Most Promising Actor	Félix Moati	Nominated
