= Marie Wilson (painter) =

Surrealist painter (1922–2017)

- Born: 1922; Cedarville, California
- Died: 2017 (aged 94–95); Athens, Greece
- Education: Mills College, BFA; University of California, Berkeley, MFA
- Known for: surrealist paintings, drawing, ceramics
- Movement: Surrealism
- Spouse: Nanos Valaoritis

Marie Wilson (1922–2017) was an American surrealist painter. Wilson worked in the style of surrealism, creating oil paintings, lithographs, drawings and ceramics.

== Early life and education ==
Wilson was born in 1922 in Cedarville, California. She attended Mills College in the San Francisco Bay Area where she received a BFA degree in 1944. She went on to pursue a graduate degree at the University of California, Berkeley, earning an MFA in 1948.

== Career ==
In 1950, Wilson met the American artist Gordon Onslow Ford and the Turkish-born Greek artist Jean Varda in Sausalito, California. Through these professional relationships, she became engaged with the Dynaton movement and its associated intellectual community.

In 1952, Wilson moved to Paris where her work was curated into exhibitions by André Breton.The paintings were influenced by Indigenous cultures of the Americas, spirituality, and the occult. Wilson's semi-abstract paintings incorporated geometric and biomorphic formal elements. The compositions of her later work were highly symmetrical. It has been described as having "a transcendental artistic language that was uniquely her own: a poetic, masterful, and harmonious fusion of the sacred and the surreal." In Paris she met the painters, Max Ernst and Pablo Picasso, the conceptual artist, Marcel Duchamp, the sculptor Alberto Giacometti, and other modernist artists. She became interested in Zen Buddhism and Hinduism as well as the mythology of pre-Columbian cultures.

The poet Lawrence Ferlinghetti organized a one-person show of Wilson's works in 1984, titled, Apparitions: The Mythical World of Marie Wilson.

In 2024–2025, Her work is included in the Vital Signs exhibition at the Museum of Modern Art in New York.

In 2026, Wilson's work was presented in a solo exhibition at the Wendy Norris Gallery in San Francisco; it had been forty years since she had a solo exhibition.

The book, The Occult, in Modernist Art, Literature, and Cinema includes a chapter on Wilson's work.

== Personal life ==
Wilson met the Greek poet, Nanos Valaoritis in 1954, whom she introduced to André Breton. They collaborated on a book project in 1958 Terre de Diamant, that included 16 of Wilson's lithographs with mandala motifs which were partnered with 16 poems by Valaoritis who wrote them in response to the imagery. They were married in 1960, and moved to Greece. The couple had three children, and in 1968 moved to Oakland, California.

== Death and legacy ==
Wilson died in 2017 in Athens, Greece.

A selection of Wilson's papers, manuscripts, works and ephemera are held in the archives and collections of André Breton.
