= Ellomenos =

Ellomenos Ελλομένος
- Municipal unit
- Location within the regional unit

- Location within Greece
- Coordinates: 38°44′N 20°43′E
- Country: Greece
- Administrative region: Ionian Islands
- Regional unit: Lefkada
- Municipality: Lefkada
- Districts: 9

Area
  - Municipal unit: 56.017 km^{2} (21.628 sq mi)
- Elevation: 6 m (20 ft)

Population (2021)
  - Municipal unit: 3,832
  - Municipal unit density: 68.41/km^{2} (177.2/sq mi)
- Time zone: UTC+2 (EET)
  - Summer (DST): UTC+3 (EEST)
- Postal code: 311 00
- Area code: 26290
- Vehicle registration: EY
- Website: ellomenou.gr

Ellomenos (Greek: Ελλομένος) is a former municipality on the island of Lefkada, Ionian Islands, Greece. Since the 2011 local government reform it is part of the municipality Lefkada, of which it is a municipal unit. It is located in the southeastern part of the island, and has a land area of 56.017 km². Its population was 3,832 at the 2021 census. The seat of the municipality was in the town of Nydri.

== Subdivisions ==
The municipal unit Ellomenos is subdivided into the following communities (constituent villages in brackets):

- Charadiatika (Charadiatika, Alatro, Steno)
- Fterno
- Katochori (Katochori, Desimi)
- Neochori (Neochori, Kallithea, Agios Christoforos, islet Madouri)
- Nydri (Nydri, Rachi)
- Platystoma (Platystoma, Perigiali)
- Poros (Poros, Mikros Gialos)
- Vafkeri
- Vlycho (Vlycho, Geni)

== Population ==
Year	Municipality population
1991	2,921
2001	3,352
2011	3,570
2021	3,832

== See also ==
- List of settlements in the Lefkada regional unit
