= I'm All Yours (film) =

- Theatrical release poster
- Je suis à vous tout de suite
- Directed by: Baya Kasmi
- Written by: Baya Kasmi; Michel Leclerc
- Produced by: Antoine Rein; Antoine Gandaubert; Fabrice Goldstein; Caroline Adrian
- Starring: Vimala Pons; Mehdi Djaadi; Agnès Jaoui; Ramzy Bedia
- Cinematography: Guillaume Deffontaines
- Edited by: Monica Coleman
- Music by: Jérôme Bensoussan
- Production companies: Karé Productions; Delante Cinéma
- Distributed by: Le Pacte
- Release dates: 28 August 2015 (Angoulême); 30 September 2015 (France)
- Running time: 100 minutes
- Country: France
- Language: French
- Budget: $4.5 million
- Box office: $565.000

I'm All Yours (original title: Je suis à vous tout de suite) is a 2015 French comedy-drama film directed by Baya Kasmi, and co-written by Kasmi and Michel Leclerc.

== Cast ==
- Vimala Pons as Hanna Belkacem
- Mehdi Djaadi as Hakim / Donnadieu Belkacem
- Agnès Jaoui as Simone Belkacem
- Ramzy Bédia as Monsieur Belkacem
- Laurent Capelluto as Paul
- Claudia Tagbo as Ébène
- Camélia Jordana as Kenza
- Anémone as The grandmother
- Zinedine Soualem as Omar
- Carole Franck as Paul's sister
- Bruno Podalydès as Christophe
- Michel Leclerc as a grocery customer
