= Kyra Frosini =

Greek socialite (c. 1773 – 1800)

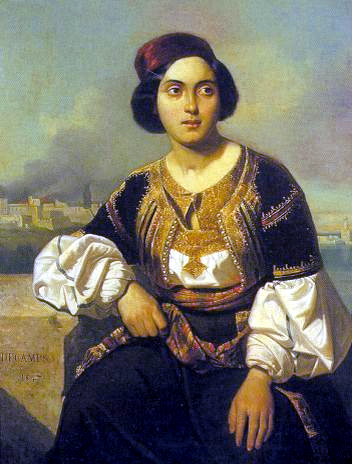

Euphrosyne Vasileiou (Greek: Ευφροσύνη Βασιλείου; c. 1773 – 11 January 1800), better known as Kyra Frosini (Κυρά Φροσύνη, "Lady Phrosyne"), was an ethnic Greek socialite who was executed for adultery in Ioannina by the Ottoman governor Ali Pasha of Ioannina along with 17 other women. In legend, she was allegedly executed for political reasons and was thereby viewed as a national heroine. The case of Kyra Frosini has been portrayed in fiction as a novel, an opera, a film as well as in folk songs.

== Life ==
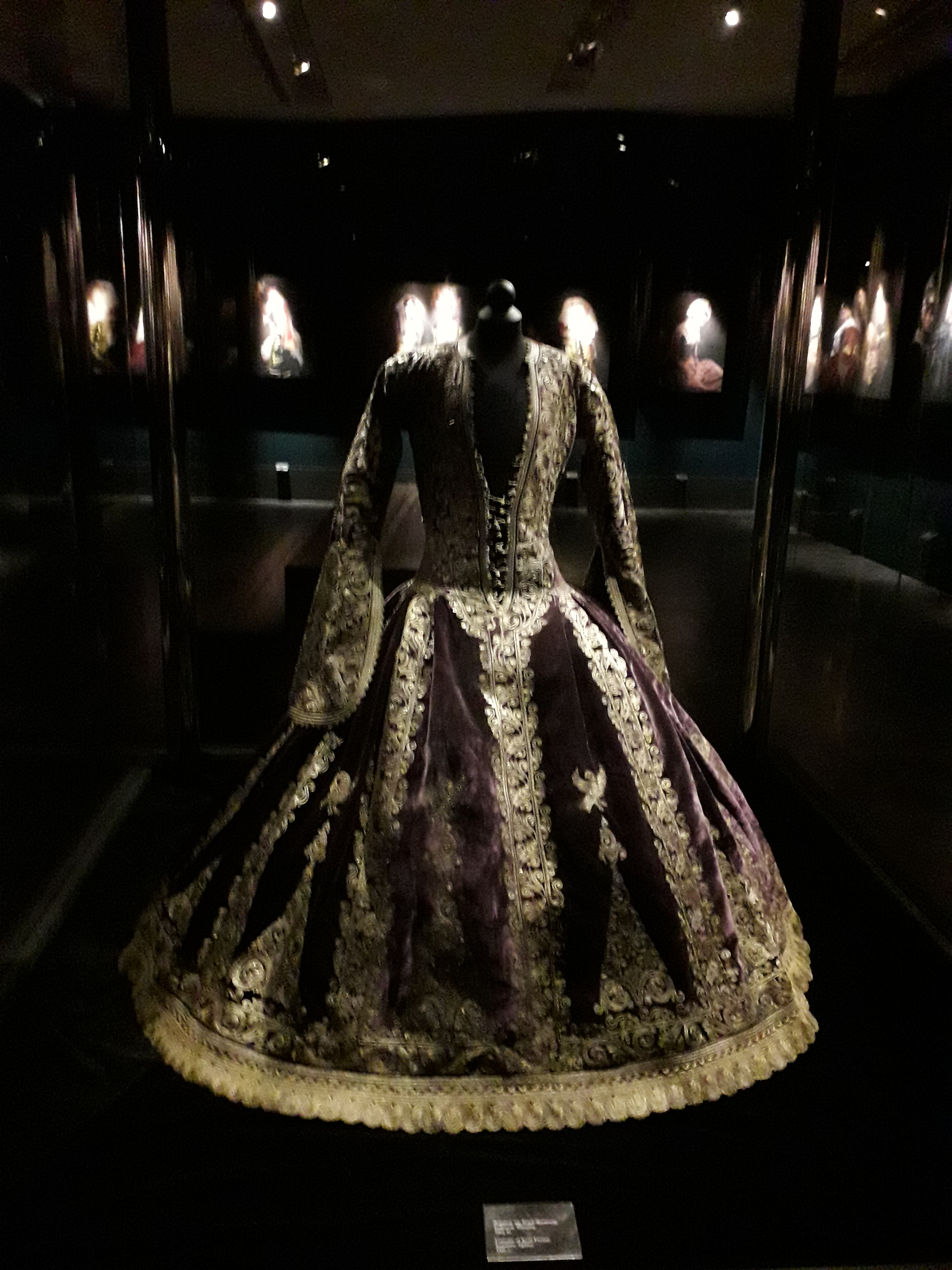
Costume of Kyra Frosini

Kyra (Euphrosyne) Frosini was the niece of the Bishop of Ioannina and married to the wealthy merchant Dimitrios Vasileiou, with whom she had two children. She was a leading member of the local aristocracy in Ioannina and known for her beauty and intelligence. Ali Pasha had carved out his own semi-autonomous state within the Ottoman Empire centered in Ioannina. In his court he brought in intellectuals from all over Europe. Euphrosyne was the central figure and leader of a local parlour and group of intellectuals that celebrated the arts and literature.

It is within this framework that Ali Pasha's son, Muhtar Pasha, attended the society's gatherings and had gotten to know and admire Euphrosyne. Her spouse was often absent due to business, and Kyra Frosini is known to have had a love affair with Muhtar Pasha. Over time the local Turkish women began to complain to Ali Pasha about this society led by Euphrosyne.

=== Execution ===
On 10 January 1800, Ali Pasha had Kyra Frosini arrested alongside 17 other women pointed out for the crime of adultery and had them all imprisoned. The arrest attracted attention and protests from the Greek community in the sensitive political climate in Ottoman Greece. Only 1 of the 18 women arrested was released from custody.

On the night of 11 January 1800, all 17 women, including Kyra Frosini, were executed by drowning in Lake Pamvotida by the order of Ali Pasha. The women were reportedly sewn in sacks and pushed in the lake from a boat in the night.

The reason for the swift execution was reportedly the immediate rage that had occurred in the community because of the arrests, and the willingness of the next of kin of the accused to forgive their purported crimes. According to one version, Dimitrios Vasiliou had been given the question if he wished to continue to live with a prostitute (his wife), and he had answered yes. Conversely, Muhtar Pasha was never punished for his dalliance with Eyphrosyne.

=== Aftermath ===
Kyra Frosini and the other women were buried with all honors at the convent of St Anargyroi by the grace of her uncle bishop Gabriel. Reportedly, the women were regarded as martyrs of the Ottomans by their contemporary Greeks.

Ali Pasha had taken many measures and building projects to cultivate favor among the Greek Epirote community. However the execution of Euphrosyne and the other Greek women turned the local population against him. This became significant during the Greek War of Independence. The Turkish Sultan in Constantinople, Selim III, was more concerned with Ali Pasha's rising power than the Greek rebellion in the Peloponnesus. When Ottoman forces moved on Ali Pasha he was all but abandoned.

== The case in history ==
Several theories have been presented as the cause of this event.

One theory claims that Ali Pasha was asked by his daughter-in-law to arrest Kyra Frosini for being the lover of her spouse, and that he followed her wish because his daughter-in-law was well connected and he did not wish to lose the support of her powerful family.

A local rumour says that, Ali Pasha himself was deep in love with her and couldn't bear her affair and feelings for his son and her influence over him and that he executed the other women only as a cover up.

Another theory was that Ioannina was at that point a society strongly influenced by the West and that Kyra Frosini was a representative of the liberal sexual values within the European aristocracy, where women could take lovers, and that Ali Pasha wished to exterminate what he viewed as decadence and restore conservative sexual double standards. Adultery committed by a woman was considered a very serious crime in Islamic law, and Ali Pasha was at that point in a difficult position against the Ottoman authorities. He did not wish to seem to be a weak ruler in his province, particularly since there had been some problems with robberies and kidnappings in the province at that time.

In Greece, however, the most popular theory was that the women, at least Frosini, had been executed for political reasons after having been discovered for their taking part in the resistance against the Ottoman Empire, and she was therefore hailed as a national heroine.

The real reason may very well be a combination of the above scenarios.

== Legacy ==
The case of Kyra Frosini became subject of a poem by Aristotelis Valaoritis in 1859, an opera by Pavlos Carrer, and a film in 1959 Grigoris Grigoriou with Irene Papas in the part of Kyra Frosini.
