= Close to the Sultan =

- French: Dans la chambre du sultan
- Directed by: Javier Rebollo
- Screenplay by: Javier Rebollo; Luis Bértolo
- Starring: Félix Moati; Pilar López de Ayala; Ilies Kadri; Jan Budař; Farouk Saïdi
- Cinematography: Santiago Racaj
- Edited by: Marine de Contes
- Production companies: Paraíso Production; Sideral; Eddie Saeta; Noodles Productions
- Distributed by: Sideral Cinema (es)
- Release dates: 7 October 2024 (Cinespaña); 15 November 2024 (Spain)
- Countries: France; Spain
- Languages: French; Arabic; English; Spanish

Close to the Sultan (French: Dans la chambre du sultan; Spanish: En la alcoba del sultán) is a 2024 comedy-drama film directed by Javier Rebollo starring Félix Moati, Pilar López de Ayala, Ilies Kadri, Jan Budař, and Farouk Saïdi. It is a French-Spanish co-production.

== Plot ==
The plot follows Lumière Brothers collaborator Gabriel Veyre as he ventures into the land of Nour in 1901 in order to introduce the cinematograph to the sultan.

== Cast ==
- Félix Moati as Gabriel Veyre
- Pilar López de Ayala as Juanita / Jeanne
- Farouk Saïdi as Abraham
- Ilies Kadri as the Venerable Sultan
- Jan Budař as caïd MacLean

== Production ==
Close to the Sultan is a French-Spanish co-production by Paraíso Production, Sideral, Eddie Saeta and Noodles Productions and it had the collaboration of CNC, ICAA, ICEC, Eurimages and the backing of Creative Europe MEDIA.

== Release ==
The film premiered at the Toulouse Spanish Film Festival (Cinespaña) on 7 October 2024. It also made it to the main competition of the 69th Valladolid International Film Festival (for its Spanish premiere). Distributed by Sideral Cinema, it was released theatrically in Spain on 15 November 2024.

== Reception ==
Elsa Fernández-Santos of El País deemed the film to be "a delicate and stimulating oddity within the Spanish film scene".

Rubén Romero Santos of Cinemanía rated the film 4 out of 5 stars, declaring Rebollo's return "a celebration of the joy of storytelling, in any format and in any situation".

Eulàlia Iglesias of Fotogramas rated the film 3 out of 5 stars, singling out the recovery for cinema of López de Ayala as the best thing about the film.

== Accolades ==
Year	Award	Category	Nominee(s)	Result	Ref.
2025	12th Feroz Awards	'Arrebato' Special Award (Fiction)		Pending	

== See also ==
- List of Spanish films of 2024
