= The Very Private Life of Mister Sim =

- Theatrical release poster
- Directed by: Michel Leclerc
- Screenplay by: Baya Kasmi; Michel Leclerc
- Based on: The Terrible Privacy of Maxwell Sim by Jonathan Coe
- Produced by: Caroline Adrian; Fabrice Goldstein; Antoine Rein
- Starring: Jean-Pierre Bacri
- Cinematography: Guillaume Deffontaines
- Edited by: François Gédigier
- Music by: Vincent Delerm
- Production companies: Karé Productions; Delante Films
- Distributed by: Mars Distribution
- Release dates: 7 October 2015 (Busan); 16 December 2015 (France)
- Running time: 102 minutes
- Country: France
- Language: French
- Budget: $5 million
- Box office: $1.1 million

The Very Private Life of Mister Sim (original title: La Vie très privée de Monsieur Sim; also known as The Terrible Privacy of Mr. Sim) is a 2015 French comedy-drama film directed by Michel Leclerc and starring Jean-Pierre Bacri. It is an adaptation of the 2010 novel The Terrible Privacy of Maxwell Sim by English author Jonathan Coe. It was released in France on 16 December 2015.

== Cast ==
- Jean-Pierre Bacri as François Sim
- Isabelle Gélinas as Caroline
- Vimala Pons as Poppy
- Sixtine Dutheil as Lucy
- Christian Bouillette as Jacques Sim
- Vincent Lacoste as Jacques Sim (20 years old)
- Félix Moati as Francis
- Carole Franck as Audrey
- Jeanne Cherhal as Emmanuelle (voice)
- Mathieu Amalric as Samuel
- Valeria Golino as Luigia
- Linh Dan Pham as Liam
- Venantino Venantini as Monsieur Matteotti
- Francine Olivier as Madame Matteotti
- Daniel Di Grazia as François Sim (19 years old)
- Patrick d'Assumçao as Neighbour on the plane
- Daniel-Jean Colloredo as Gabriel
- François Bureloup as Patrio Biobuccal
- Jean-Pierre Lorit as Lino (50 years old)
- Lucile Krier as Luigia (18 years old)

== Accolades ==
Award / Film Festival	Category	Recipients and nominees	Result
César Awards	Best Actor	Jean-Pierre Bacri	Nominated
