= The Rotters' Club (novel) =

2001 novel by Jonathan Coe

- First edition
- Author: Jonathan Coe
- Cover artist: gray318
- Language: English
- Publisher: Viking Press
- Publication date: 22 February 2001
- Publication place: UK
- Media type: Print (hardcover, paperback) and audio book
- Pages: 405pp (hardcover edition), 416 pp (paperback edition)
- ISBN: 978-0-670-89252-5
- OCLC: 45338345
- Dewey Decimal: 823/.914 21
- LC Class: PR6053.O26 R68 2001
- Preceded by: The House of Sleep
- Followed by: The Closed Circle

The Rotters' Club is a 2001 novel by British author Jonathan Coe. It is set in Birmingham during the 1970s, and inspired by the author's experiences at King Edward's School, Birmingham. The title is taken from the album The Rotters' Club by experimental rock band Hatfield and the North. The book was followed by two sequels.

The book contains one of the longest sentences in English literature, with 13,955 words. The Rotters' Club was inspired by Bohumil Hrabal's Dancing Lessons for the Advanced in Age: a Czech-language novel that consisted of one great sentence.

== Plot summary ==
Three teenage friends grow up in 1970s Britain watching their lives change as their world gets involved with IRA bombs, progressive and punk rock, girls and political strikes.

== Characters ==
- Ben Trotter: A romantic musician and writer who has fallen for Cicely Boyd, the most beautiful pupil at the adjoining girls' school.
- Philip Chase: Best friend of Ben. He is heavily into progressive rock and attempts to form a band named "Gandalf's Pikestaff".
- Doug Anderton: A passionate writer and opinionated young man, Doug attempts to transfer the socialist values of his father Bill to his mostly middle-class school.
- Claire Newman: Closest female friend of Benjamin, Philip and Doug, and the younger sister of Miriam. She has bitter feelings about religion due to the Christianity forced upon her and her sister by their ill-tempered father.
- Colin Trotter: In middle management at British Leyland's Longbridge plant. He interacts obliquely with Derek Robinson or "Red Robbo" as he was dubbed by the media.
- Sheila Trotter: Ben's mother.
- Paul Trotter: Ben's younger brother.
- Lois Trotter: Paul and Ben's sister. She attends the adjoining girls' school.
- Malcolm: Amiable guitarist and self-professed 'Hairy Guy' Malcolm is Lois's boyfriend, whom she met when she answered his personal ad in the newspaper.
- Bill Anderton: Shop steward at the Longbridge factory and an active Union man, he begins an affair with one of his colleagues, Miriam.
- Irene Anderton: Bill's wife and Doug's mother.
- Miriam Newman: The attractive secretary at the Longbridge factory.
- Sam Chase: Philip's dad, who works as a bus driver; friend of Ben, Philip and Doug.
- Barbara Chase: Wife of Sam and mother of Philip, she begins an affair with Miles Plumb, her son's art teacher.
- Miles Plumb: The flamboyant art teacher at King William's, the school the teenagers attend.
- Cicely Boyd: The most beautiful girl at the adjoining girls' school. She is the object of many of the boys' affections, particularly Ben Trotter's.
- Sean Harding: Attends King William's. Harding is viewed as a practical joker. He writes letters to the school newspaper, The Billboard, under the pseudonym Arthur Pusey-Hamilton.

== Adaptation ==
In 2003, a four-part BBC Radio 4 adaptation written by Simon Littlefield was broadcast with David Tennant playing the part of Bill Anderton and Frank Skinner as Sam Trotter. In early 2005, a three-part television adaptation written by Dick Clement and Ian La Frenais was broadcast on BBC Two, starring Geoff Breton as Ben Trotter, Nicholas Shaw as Doug Anderton, Peter Bankole as Steve Richards, and Rasmus Hardiker as Phillip Chase.

The UK indie band Neils Children featured as the band playing at the 'live' concert in the programme. The song used was one of their own, after the band turned down the song supplied by the musical director of the show.

== Reception ==
In a 2002 review, The New York Times praised The Rotters' Club as "richly constructed and brilliantly ornamented." The Daily Telegraph characterized the book as an "ambitious... moving, richly comic novel," according to the publisher's website. A review in The Guardian was more ambivalent, critiquing Coe's tendency to introduce larger social and political issues into a coming-of-age story, arguing that various characters "undergo rites of passage that make no difference."

== Sequels ==
Coe has published two sequels to the book. The Closed Circle picked up the characters' lives at the very end of the 1990s. Middle England opens in 2010 and addresses issues such as Brexit and climate change.

== Influence ==
- The British Punk band The Rotters named themselves after the novel. The band was known for featuring a young Faris Badwan on drums.
