= What a Carve Up! (film) =

1961 film by Pat Jackson

- Theatrical release poster
- Directed by: Pat Jackson
- Written by: Ray Cooney; Tony Hilton
- Based on: The Ghoul by Frank King
- Produced by: Robert S. Baker; Monty Berman
- Starring: Sid James; Kenneth Connor; Shirley Eaton
- Cinematography: Monty Berman
- Edited by: Gordon Pilkington
- Music by: Muir Mathieson
- Production company: New World Pictures
- Distributed by: Regal Films
- Release date: 15 September 1961
- Running time: 87 minutes
- Country: United Kingdom
- Language: English

What a Carve Up! (Note: The exclamation point does not appear onscreen in original prints.) is a 1961 British comedy horror film directed by Pat Jackson and starring Sid James, Kenneth Connor, and Shirley Eaton. It was released in the United States in 1962 as No Place Like Homicide. It was written by Ray Cooney and Tony Hilton, loosely based on the 1928 novel The Ghoul by Frank King. A previous adaptation, titled The Ghoul, was filmed in 1933 by Gaumont-British Pictures.

The film is set in Yorkshire, in a moorland area. Following the supposed death of the latest owner of an isolated country house, his family gathers there for the reading of his will. They learn that they are disinherited, and then find themselves trapped in the house. The family and guests start being killed one by one, and they suspect that the house's owner has faked his death.

The film was used extensively within Jonathan Coe's 1994 satirical novel What a Carve Up! The book's protagonist, Michael Owen, becomes obsessed with the film after first watching it as a young boy, and the last part of the book follows the plot of the film.

== Plot ==
The relatives of Gabriel Broughton are summoned to Blackshaw Towers, an old, isolated country house in the middle of moorlands in Yorkshire, to hear the reading of his will. Gabriel's nervous nephew Ernest Broughton brings along his flatmate Syd Butler for support. At the large, gloomy mansion, they meet Guy Broughton, Ernest's alcoholic cousin; Malcolm Broughton, a deranged piano player who claims everyone is "quite mad"; shrewish, nagging Janet Broughton and Dr Edward Broughton, Guy's sister and father, respectively; Emily Broughton, a senile old spinster aunt who believes the First World War is still on; and Linda Dixon, Gabriel's blonde, beautiful nurse. To their surprise and the fury of the avaricious Janet, the solicitor Everett Sloane reveals that they have all inherited nothing, except for Linda, who is bequeathed Gabriel's medicines and syringe, much to her amusement.

The lights go out, and Ernest and Syd accompany Fisk, the butler, outside to try to effect repairs. They are unsuccessful, but on the way back, they find the body of Dr. Broughton. Syd states it was murder, but when he tries to telephone the police, he discovers the wire has been cut. With everyone stranded for the night, Sloane recommends they all lock themselves in their rooms. Ernest gets lost and enters Linda's room by mistake. She proposes that he stay the night with her, but he beats a hasty retreat and persuades the imperturbable Syd to share his room.

When Ernest goes to use the toilet, someone tries to stab the sleeping Syd, then desists when he speaks up. Ernest starts playing "Chopsticks" on the organ. Malcolm joins him in a duet, but is stabbed in the back. Ernest's screams bring the others, and Sloane observes that the room was locked from the inside, so the solicitor recommends locking him in. Syd stays with Ernest, certain he is not the killer. They discover a secret passage, uncovering the means by which the murderer was able to leave the locked room.

The survivors decide to remain together in the lounge for safety, but Janet is struck by a poison dart, shot from behind a painting on the wall. They suspect Fisk, who was not present, but he has an airtight alibi. Sloane decides on his own to go to the village and fetch the police. When the others return to the room, Emily, who remained behind, insists she spoke to Gabriel. Syd and Guy check the coffin, but Gabriel's body is there. Then Ernest claims he also saw Gabriel. He finds another secret passage that leads to the now empty coffin, and then Guy also disappears, along with a small pistol he had in his possession.

Finally Police Inspector Arkwright arrives. He is sceptical that murders have been committed, especially since there are no bodies, but then Guy's is found. When Ernest goes to fetch Syd, they find the dead Sloane in a fountain outside, proving he could not have sent the policeman. However, the inspector – Gabriel in disguise – still manages to take them all prisoner with Guy's pistol.

Gabriel explains his motive, that his relatives sponged off of him for years and treated him badly. He then locks up Syd, Ernest, Emily and Linda and sets starving dogs on them. When he tries to shoot the fleeing Fisk, Gabriel misses and triggers a lethal trap instead, which drops a chandelier on him. The dogs, it turns out, were fed by Fisk, so they constitute no danger. The next day, to Ernest's disappointment, Linda's boyfriend comes to collect her.

== Cast ==
- Sid James as Syd Butler
- Kenneth Connor as Ernest Broughton
- Shirley Eaton as Linda Dixon
- Dennis Price as Guy Broughton
- Donald Pleasence as Everett Sloane
- Michael Gough as Fisk
- Esma Cannon as Emily Broughton
- Valerie Taylor as Janet Broughton
- Michael Gwynn as Malcolm Broughton
- George Woodbridge as Dr Edward Broughton
- Philip O'Flynn as Gabriel Broughton and Arkwright
- Frederick Piper as the hearse driver
- Timothy Bateson as the porter
- Adam Faith as Linda's boyfriend (uncredited)

== Production ==
Filming took place at Twickenham starting 3 April 1961. It was the ninth film from Regal Films.

Production manager John Goodman recalled they were asked to make suggestions for the title. "So everything came in from 'There's no Ghoul like an Old Ghoul' and 'Ghoul's step in' and 'The Singing Ghoul' and God knows what! Eventually it came out as What a Carve Up!"

Although George Woodbridge plays Valerie Taylor's father, he was in fact five years younger than her.

== Reception ==
When the film was released in London Kinematograph Weekly declared " So far it hasn't hit the jack pot. but it's hardly a West End solo feature. Suburban and provincial 'ninepennies' will go for it all right." Later in the year the same magazine said the film "proved popular with the industrial masses."

=== Critical ===
Variety thought "it doesn't quite come off."

Monthly Film Bulletin wrote: "Based on a battered Old Dark House story called The Ghoul, filmed straight by T. Hayes Hunter in 1933 as a Boris Karloff vehicle, the picture evenly measures the farcical against the frightening, and has a lot of fun parodying both the Hammer product and familiar Boileau-Narcejac situations. Kenneth Connor and Sidney James are an effective comedy team; Donald Pleasence, Dennis Price, Michael Gough, Michael Gwynn and Valerie Taylor make unusually high-class suspects, excellently played; and for once this sort of thing – which is hardly original – really looks as though it has been directed. But though Pat Jackson's wit of cutting and angle is first-rate, the film goes sadly off the rails with the late introduction of a new and badly acted character, and finally throws in the sponge with the 'guest' appearance of Adam Faith. Dialogue and atmosphere are otherwise most apt."

The New York Times wrote: "At one point in No Place Like Homicide, a giggling maniac threatens to feed the rest of the cast to a pack of starving mongrels. 'Oh, blimey', smirks one of the victims, 'we're going to the dogs'. The rest of the humour in this ostensible British farce is on a similar level. The fact that a film of this degree of vulgarity and ineptitude should have managed a week's booking at neighbourhood theatres throughout Manhattan demonstrates just how acute the motion picture product shortage really is."

The Radio Times Guide to Films gave the film 3/5 stars, writing: "An old dark house comedy, co-written by that master of the double entendre, Ray Cooney. Carry On regulars Sid James and Kenneth Connor are among those gathering at a musty mansion in the hope of inheriting a fortune, but, as anyone who has seen The Cat and the Canary can tell you, the chances of a will being read without blood being shed are pretty slim. The cast works wonders with a script that too often settles for a cheap laugh."

Leslie Halliwell said: "Spooky house farce, allegedly a remake of The Ghoul but bearing little resemblance to it."

In his book Comedy-Horror Films: A Chronological History, 1914-2008, Bruce G. Hallenbeck called What a Carve Up! "one of the better horror spoofs of the decade", citing its mixture of Carry On-style comedy and haunted house plot, charming period tone, and "creepy atmosphere that ranks with some of the best serious horror films."

== Home media ==
What a Carve Up! was released on DVD in the U.K. on 11 August 2008.
