= Expo 58 (novel) =

Expo 58 is the tenth novel by Jonathan Coe. First published by Viking in 2013, much of the novel's action centres around the British pavilion at the Brussels World's Fair. The work was nominated to the 2015 longlist for the International Dublin Literary Award.
