= Number 11 (novel) =

2015 novel by Jonathan Coe

- First edition
- Author: Jonathan Coe
- Language: English
- Genre: Novel
- Publisher: Viking Press
- Publication date: 2015
- Pages: 350
- ISBN: 9780670923809
- OCLC: 923731419

Number 11 is a novel by British writer Jonathan Coe, published in 2015. The book explores the changing social, economical and cultural landscape of the United Kingdom in the early 21st century. It is connected to Coe's previous novel What a Carve Up!, through shared themes and references to characters and events from the latter.

== Plot summary ==
The book comprises five parts with interconnected plot lines and multiple points of view.

The Black Tower takes place in rural Yorkshire in 2003, soon after the invasion of Iraq and the death of David Kelly. It follows the beginning of the friendship between ten-year-old girls Rachel and Alison as they try to decipher mysterious happenings around the village where Rachel's grandparents live. The Comeback is set in 2011 and focuses on Alison and her mother Val, now living in Birmingham. Alison, estranged from Rachel due to a misunderstanding after coming out as gay to her, is trying to form new relationships. Val, a former one-hit-wonder singer and a librarian facing reduced working hours, is offered the chance to appear on a reality show, which she accepts in the hopes of reviving her career. Although she gets along with the other participants, the footage is heavily edited to paint her in a bad light, leading to a hugely negative response from the audience. Alison watches horrified as her mother is made to undertake very unpleasant and humiliating tasks, until she returns home traumatised. The Crystal Garden follows Laura, a lecturer at Oxford University. Over the course of a weekend in 2011, she tells Rachel, now a student there, the story of her recently deceased husband's obsession with a short film he had seen as a child, and how the search for it led to his death. The Winshaw Prize is the story of how young policeman Nathan Pilbeam tries to find the connection between the apparently accidental deaths of two comedians. His approach, which advocates understanding the political and social context of a crime, allows him to not only predict the next target but identify the killer, a man who believes that comedy is making people complacent and is a danger to democracy.

In What a Whopper!, Rachel is hired as a private tutor for the children of a very rich family. She lives in their house in Kensington, in a section reserved for staff, while work to build an extravagant eleven-level basement to the house is being undertaken. She meets Laura again, who has a new post trying to promote humanitarian values in a financial organisation. A chance encounter with Val, who now has to attend food banks for sustenance, leads to her reconnecting with Alison, serving a brief term in prison after being framed for benefit fraud. At the same time, secondary characters from throughout the novel who are wealthy residents of the area mysteriously go missing, with a promoted Pilbeam researching the case. Rachel struggles to understand and adapt to her employers' mentality, lifestyle and activities, which, along with personal difficulties, culminates in her having a breakdown. The final chapters show that Rachel, Alison and Val are recovering from their problems, while the missing people are implied to have been abducted in retribution for their past behaviour.

== Critical reception ==
In a review for the Financial Times, Suzi Feay described the novel as "a richly enjoyable, densely textured and thought-provoking entertainment". In The Scotsman, Allan Massie wrote a good review, concluding that "one should be grateful for any novel which, like this one, is devoted to the great cause of cheering us all up, no matter how indignant the author may often be." Meanwhile, Erica Wagner of the New Statesman concluded that while the novel could be seen as preachy, it makes good points about London under austerity measures.

However, Robert Epstein of The Independent deplored that the novel was "too obvious, both in its targets and in their subsequent takedown". In The London Evening Standard, Andrew Neather conceded that the novel was "first-class entertainment", but he lamented that it did not live up to a proper satire. Reviewing it for The Guardian, Alex Clark called it "a political novel" as well as an "interrogation of the purposes and efficacy of humour in exposing society’s ills, and a spoof on horror B-movies"
