= What a Carve Up! (novel) =

1994 novel by Jonathan Coe

- First edition
- Author: Jonathan Coe
- Language: English
- Genre: Mystery/Drama
- Publisher: Viking
- Publication date: 28 April 1994
- Publication place: United Kingdom
- Pages: 502 Pgs.
- ISBN: 0-670-85362-3
- OCLC: 30438295
- Dewey Decimal: 823/.914 20
- LC Class: PR6053.O26 W48 1994

What a Carve Up! is a satirical novel by Jonathan Coe, published in the UK by Viking Press in April 1994. It was published in the United States by Alfred A Knopf in January 1995 under the title The Winshaw Legacy: or, What a Carve Up!

== Synopsis ==
The novel concerns the political and social environment in Britain during the 1980s, and covers the period up to the beginning of aerial bombardment against Iraq in the first Gulf War in January 1991. It is a critique of British politics under the Conservative government of Margaret Thatcher (and, briefly, John Major) and of the ways in which national policy was seen to be dictated by the concerns of narrow, but powerful, interest groups with influence in banking, the media, agriculture, healthcare, the arms trade and the arts. Coe creates the fictitious Winshaw family to embody these different interests under one name and, ultimately, one roof.

== Plot summary ==
Godfrey, son of the wealthy Matthew and Frances Winshaw of Yorkshire, is shot down by German anti-aircraft fire during a secret wartime mission over Berlin, on 30 November 1942. His sister Tabitha alleges that he was betrayed by their brother Lawrence, but no-one believes her, and she is committed to a mental institution. Nineteen years later, after a party to mark the 50th birthday of their other brother Mortimer, Lawrence is attacked in the night by an intruder, but survives, killing the intruder in the process. The intruder, a middle-aged man, remains unidentified.

Later, in the 1980s, a young novelist, Michael Owen, is commissioned to write a history of the Winshaw family, receiving a generous stipend from Tabitha Winshaw to do so. He works on this on and off, but with no deadline or pressure to complete, the project stagnates and Michael becomes reclusive, staying in his London flat watching videotapes of old films – in particular the 1961 British comedy What a Carve Up! starring Kenneth Connor, Shirley Eaton and Sid James. He emerges back into society, and resumes his interest in the project, following a visit from a neighbour, Fiona, seeking sponsorship for a 40-mile bicycle ride.

The novel focuses by turns on the various figures in the Winshaw family: the lazy, hypocritical, populist tabloid newspaper columnist Hilary, the ambitious and ruthless career politician Henry, the brutal chicken and pork farmer Dorothy, the predatory art-gallery owner and art dealer Roderick (Roddy), the investment banker Thomas, and the arms dealer Mark. In each of these sections the novel depicts the way in which actions by individuals from the same family, serving their own greedy interests, have distressing and far-reaching consequences.

Michael's renewed interest in the Winshaws coincides with the appearance in his life of Findlay Onyx, a private detective hired by Tabitha to pursue the mystery of whether or not Lawrence was complicit in Godfrey's death. Michael develops a warm, but platonic, relationship with Fiona. She suffers from the symptoms of some mysterious illness, but her consultations are constantly delayed, or her records are misplaced, by underresourced health service professionals. She is eventually admitted to hospital, but because treatment was not administered soon enough, she dies shortly after New Year, 1991.

Very soon afterwards Michael is surprised to be invited by Mortimer Winshaw's solicitor, Everett Sloane, to attend the reading of Mortimer's will at the remote Winshaw Towers in Yorkshire. Until this point he believes he was invited to write the history by chance, but as events transpire he is more deeply related to the family than he realises. He attends the reading of the will along with the artist Phoebe, one of Roddy's conquests and lately Mortimer's personal nurse. The family members learn that they will inherit nothing from Mortimer but his debts. As the night progresses events begin to shadow those of the film of What a Carve Up! more and more, with the various members of the family meeting violent deaths that accord with their professional sins. It is the night that allied warplanes embark on the bombing of Iraq following the Iraqi invasion of Kuwait in 1990. It is revealed that Michael is the son of Godfrey's surviving co-pilot, who was also Lawrence's mystery attacker. The following morning Tabitha ensures that she is piloting Hilary Winshaw's seaplane to take Michael home, but deliberately destroys the plane, killing them both.

== Characters ==
Lawrence Winshaw (1902–1984) – The eldest of the Winshaw children and original heir to Winshaw Towers, the family mansion. Father of Dorothy.

Tabitha Winshaw (b. 1906) – Lawrence's sister though not next after him by birth, who was Olivia (1903-1980), mother of Thomas and Henry. Never married as she spends most of her life in a mental asylum after brother Godfrey's death.

Godfrey Winshaw (1909–1942) – Brother of Lawrence and Tabitha. Killed by enemy fire over Berlin during World War II. His young wife Mildred is pregnant with their son Mark when he dies.

Mortimer Winshaw (b. 1911) – Youngest of the Winshaw siblings of that generation. Apart from Godfrey and Tabitha, Mortimer despises all the Winshaws. He tells Phoebe, "let me give you a warning about my family, in case you hadn’t worked it out already. They’re the meanest, greediest, cruellest bunch of backstabbing, penny-pinching bastards who ever crawled across the face of the Earth. And I include my own offspring in that Statement" (209). Father of Roddy and Hilary.

Thomas Winshaw (b. 1924) – Banker, son of Olivia and brother of Henry. Invests in the film industry and has a private fascination with cinema. Installs elaborate surveillance systems in his offices and has voyeuristic tendencies.

Henry Winshaw (b. 1926) – Brother of Thomas, career politician. Attended Oxford University in the 1940s where he was a member of the Conservative Association under the presidency of a chemistry student named Margaret Roberts - who would later become prime minister Margaret Thatcher. Instrumental in policies to "reform" the National Health Service.

Dorothy Winshaw (b. 1936) – Daughter and only child of Lawrence Winshaw. Runs an intensive farm business with her rather sentimental husband George who despairs of her disregard for even the least humane treatment of animals. Creates a business empire of highly processed, slogan-promoted cheap meat-based foods.

Mark Winshaw (b. 1943) – Son of Godfrey but disinterested in his aunt Tabitha's theories that Godfrey was murdered. He is an unscrupulous arms dealer deeply involved with arming the regime of Saddam Hussein.

Roddy Winshaw (b. 1952) – Son of Mortimer and brother of Hilary. Roddy is an art-dealer who seduces female artists by promising to promote their work in his gallery, before dropping them immediately afterwards.

Hilary Winshaw (b. 1954) – Tabloid journalist. Networks her way to senior positions in the media by taking advantage of others' generosity, before betraying the people who help her. Purveyor of populist, right-wing, self-contradictory, lowest common-denominator opinion pieces.

Michael Owen – A young writer with a couple of moderately successful novels behind him who is commissioned to write the history of the Winshaws by Tabitha.

Fiona – A neighbour of Michael who becomes a close friend. Falls ill but, owing to cutbacks to the Health Service, fails to get treatment before her condition is too advanced to treat, and dies from Lymphoma.

Joan – A female friend of Michael's from his childhood, a social worker, who he visits at her home in Sheffield in 1982, meeting Phoebe and Graham for the first time there.

Findlay Onyx – A private investigator with a weakness for cottaging that gets him into constant trouble with the law. Helps Michael in his investigation into the death of Godfrey and discloses to Michael the truth about his biological father.

Graham Packard – A young film maker with strong left-wing views. While a student he lodges with Joan alongside Phoebe Barton. After graduating he starts his own production company but by chance is able to work alongside Mark Winshaw, seeing closely into the business of arms dealing. He is caught by Mark taking video footage for a planned documentary and is almost killed by the beating that follows.

Phoebe Barton – An aspiring artist who is tricked into sleeping with Roddy by his promises of artistic patronage. She is offered a position working for Mortimer Winshaw, Roddy's father, as his nurse, which she accepts. At the final night in Winshaw Towers, she and Michael become lovers.

== Style ==
What a Carve Up! is considered an example of a postmodern novel, employing multiple narrative styles, different perspectives, movement between first- and third-person narrative voices and a highly fragmented timeline.

== Critical appreciation ==
Robert McCrum called it "the finest English satire from the 1980s – a memorable and explicit commentary on Thatcherism."

== Awards ==
- John Llewellyn Rhys Prize in 1995.
- Prix du Meilleur Livre Étranger (France) in 1995.

== Sequel, of sorts ==
In 2015, the author published a related novel set in the early 21st century, Number 11. The latter novel is sometimes described as a sequel but elsewhere using other phrases such as a "sequel, of sorts." The relationship between the two books is suggested in the later novel (describing the relationship between two films, What a Carve Up! and What a Whopper) as: "Sequels which are not really sequels. Sequels where the relationship to the original is oblique, slippery." The later book contains some characters from the earlier book, more characters who are descendants or proteges of its characters, and several references to its plot and themes.

== Adaptations ==
BBC Radio 4 broadcast an eight-part dramatisation between February and April 2005. It was scripted by Reginald Perrin creator David Nobbs, produced by Lucy Armitage, and starred Robert Bathurst. A supporting cast included Rebecca Front, Charlie Higson, Geoffrey Palmer, Lucy Punch and Jeff Rawle. The radio adaptation won a Sony Radio Silver Award in 2006.

The Lawrence Batley Theatre's Henry Filloux-Bennett wrote a play based on the book. The theatre recorded a film featuring Fiona Button, Alfred Enoch, Rebecca Front, Stephen Fry, Celia Imrie, Derek Jacobi, Griff Rhys Jones and Tamzin Outhwaite and streamed it on-line.
