= Aristotelis Valaoritis =

Greek poet, representative of the Heptanese School and politician

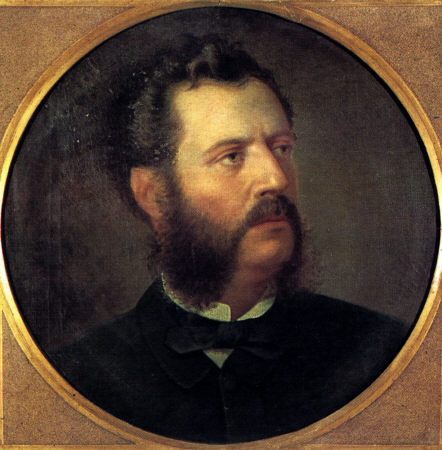
- Portrait of Aristotelis Valaoritis by Spyridon Prosalentis
- Born: 1824; Lefkada, United States of the Ionian Islands
- Died: 24 July 1879 (aged 54–55); Lefkada, Kingdom of Greece
- Education: University of Pisa
- Occupations: Poet, politician
- Spouse: Eloisia Typaldou (m. 1852)

Aristotelis Valaoritis (Greek: Αριστοτέλης Βαλαωρίτης; 1824 – 24 July 1879) was a Greek poet and politician, one of the main representatives of the Heptanese School. Writing in the spoken, demotic language on themes drawn from the Greek War of Independence, he came to be regarded as a national poet of Greece. He served as a deputy in the parliament of the United States of the Ionian Islands, where he advocated union with Greece, and later in the Greek Parliament. His best-known works include Kyra Frosini (1859), Athanasios Diakos (1867) and the unfinished O Fotinos. He was the great-grandfather of the poet and writer Nanos Valaoritis.

== Early life and education ==
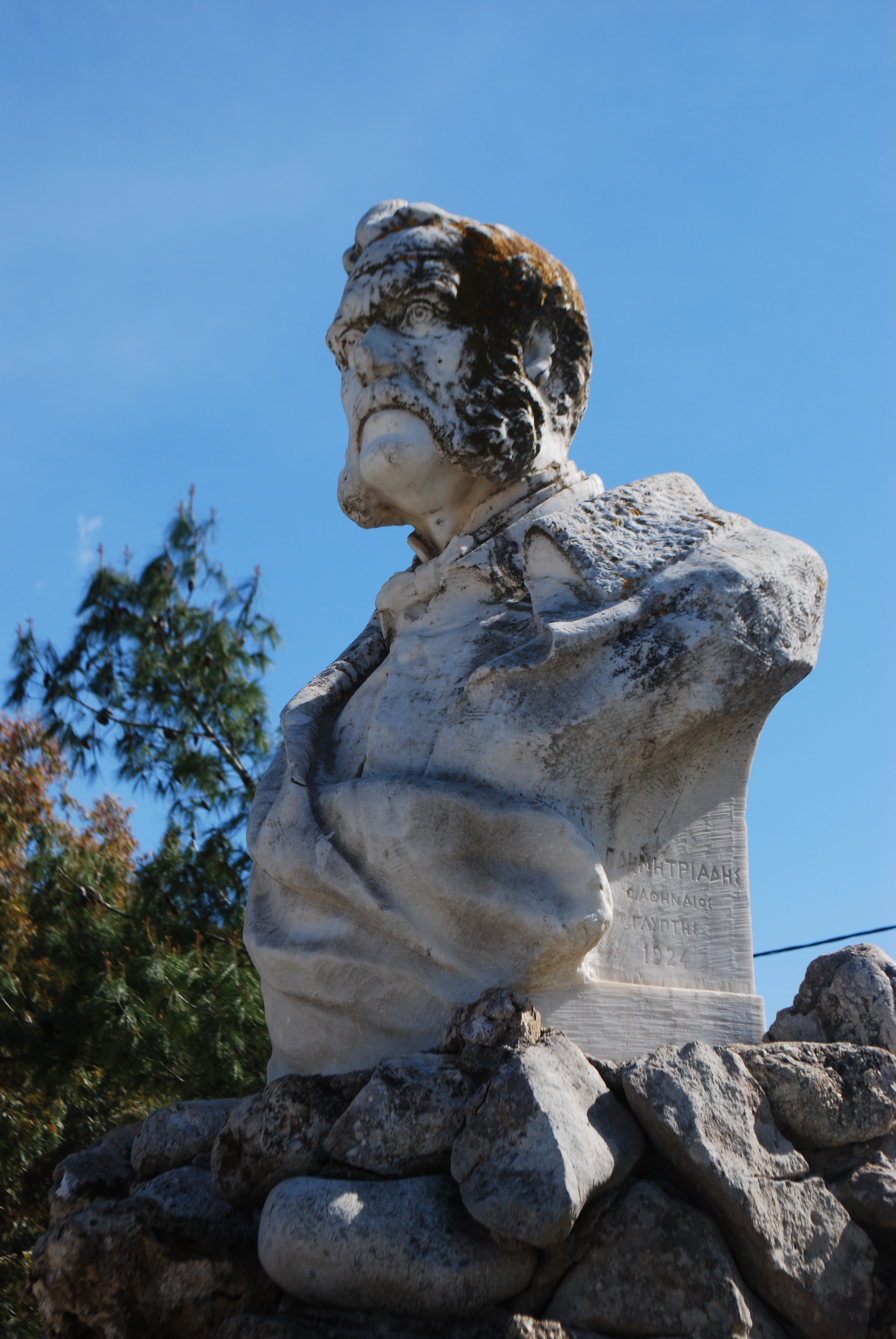
Aristotelis Valaoritis' bust in his birthplace, Lefkada

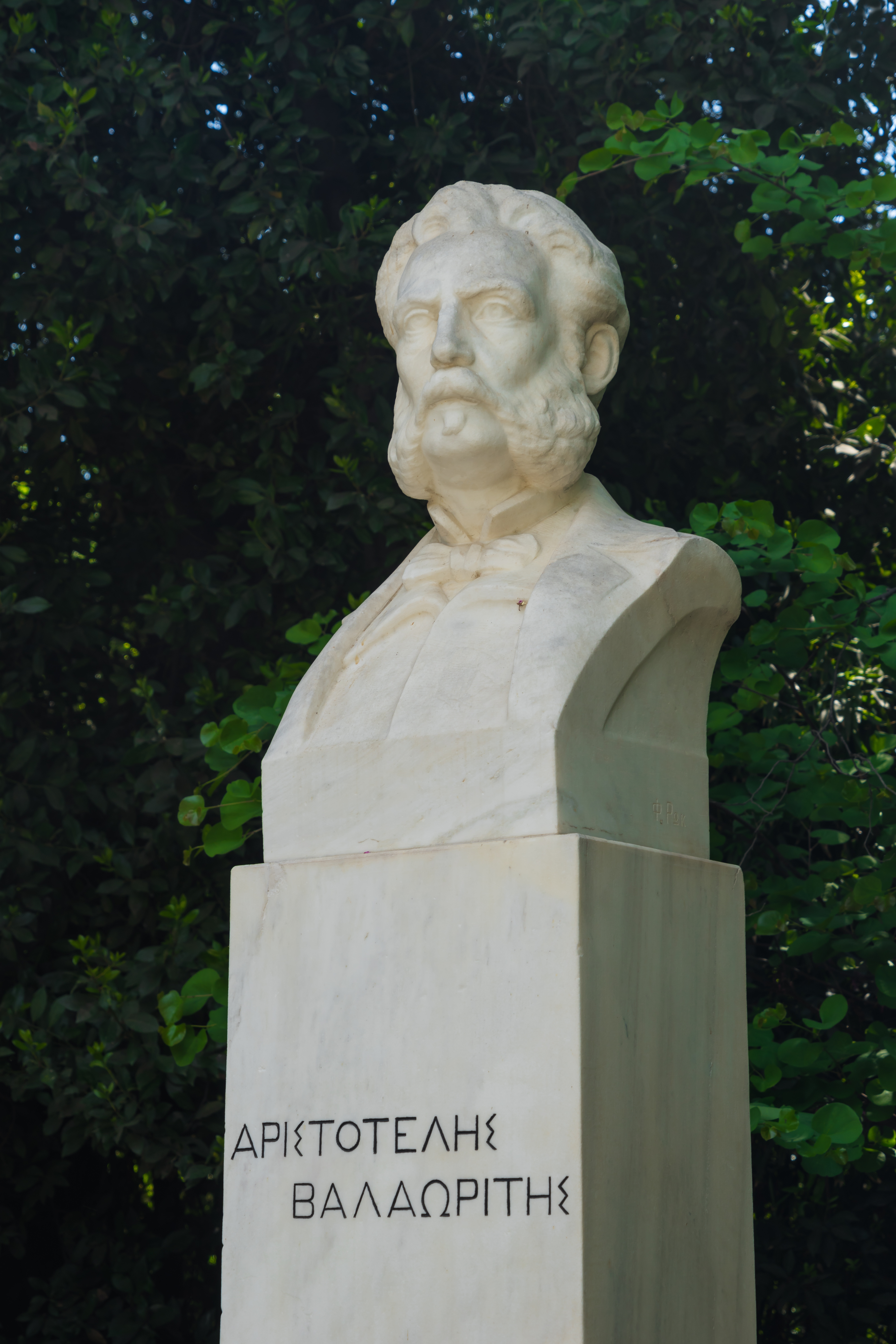
Bust in the National Garden, Athens

Valaoritis was born in Lefkada in 1824 and was of Aromanian descent. His father, Ioannis Valaoritis, was a senator and rich merchant from the region of Epirus, while his mother, Anastasia Typaldou-Foresti, came from a noble family of Cephalonia.

Valaoritis attended school in Lefkada and then studied at the Ionian Academy in Corfu from 1838 to 1841. He continued his education in Geneva and from 1844 studied law in Paris, before completing his studies at the University of Pisa. In 1847 he was arrested in Venice for anti-Austrian activity and deported to Naples. He received his doctorate in law from Pisa in 1848, where as a student he had taken part in the movement supporting the Italian uprisings. He never practised law, devoting himself instead to poetry.

== Literary career ==
Valaoritis published his first collection, Stichourgimata, in 1847, while still a student. His second collection, Mnemosyna (1857, Corfu), took as its subject the deaths of heroes of the Greek War of Independence; to it he added "The Laurel and the Nightingale", a poem written on the death of Dionysios Solomos. In 1859 he published Kyra Frosini, a long narrative poem with a dramatic structure inspired by the drowning of Frosyni on the orders of Ali Pasha. The poems Athanasios Diakos and Astrapogiannos followed in 1867.

On 25 March 1872, Valaoritis recited a poem he had been commissioned to write for the unveiling of the statue of Patriarch Gregory V of Constantinople at the University of Athens; the occasion marked his public recognition as a national poet. In 1879 he began his final work, O Fotinos, a narrative poem set in 14th-century Lefkada. Left unfinished at his death, it was published posthumously in 1891. His romantic style was shaped by his admiration of Victor Hugo.

Valaoritis spent much of his later life on the small island of Madouri, off Lefkada, which belonged to his family and where he composed O Fotinos.

== Political career ==
In 1853 Valaoritis joined the Radical faction, which sought the union of the Ionian Islands with Greece. In 1854 he supported the revolutionary movement in Epirus with men and money, bringing him into conflict with the British commissioner, and spent a year in Venice as a result. In 1857 he was elected to the parliament of the United States of the Ionian Islands as a deputy for Lefkada. After the union of the Ionian Islands with Greece in 1864, he was elected to the Greek Parliament in 1865 and 1868 with the party of Alexandros Koumoundouros, and was noted for his oratory. He withdrew from politics in 1869, following an altercation in parliament the previous year, and retired to Madouri. In his later years he devoted himself to supporting the struggle for the liberation of Epirus.

== Personal life and death ==
In 1852, in Venice, Valaoritis married Eloisia, daughter of the Venetian scholar Emilio De Tipaldo; the couple settled permanently in Lefkada in 1853. They had seven children. Three of their daughters died young: Maria in 1855, aged two, a second daughter also named Maria in 1866, and Nathalia in 1875. Valaoritis died on 24 July 1879 of a heart attack.

== Works ==
=== Poems ===
- Kyra Frosini (Η Κυρά Φροσύνη, 1859)
- Athanasios Diakos (Αθανάσιος Διάκος, 1867)
- Thanasis Vagias (Θανάσης Βάγιας, 1867)
- Astrapogiannos (Αστραπόγιαννος, 1867)
- O andrias tou aoidimou Grigoriou tou E (Ο ανδριάς του αοιδίμου Γρηγορίου του Ε, 1872)
- O Fotinos (Ο Φωτεινός; incomplete, published posthumously in 1891)

=== Collections ===
- Stichourgimata (Στιχουργήματα, 1847)
- Mnemosyna (Μνημόσυνα, 1857)

=== Posthumous editions ===
- Poiemata (Ποιήματα, 1891)
- Erga (Εργα, 1893)
- Vios kai erga (Βίος και έργα, 1907)
- Poiemata anekdota (Ποιήματα ανέκδοτα, 1937)
- Ta Apanta (Τα Άπαντα, 1968)
