= Nydri =

Nydri Νυδρί
- Community
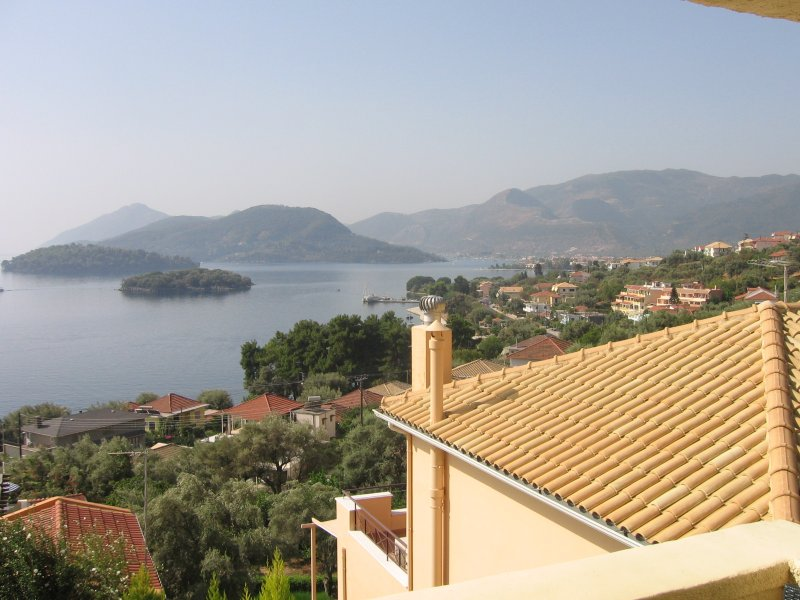

- Location within Greece
- Coordinates: 38°43′N 20°42′E
- Country: Greece
- Administrative region: Ionian Islands
- Regional unit: Lefkada

Population (2021)
  - Community: 1,402
- Time zone: UTC+2 (EET)
  - Summer (DST): UTC+3 (EEST)

Nydri (Greek: Νυδρί) is a town and a community on the eastern coast of the island of Lefkada, Greece. It is part of the municipal unit Ellomenos. The community includes the small village Rachi. The Greek National Road 42 (Vasiliki - Lefkada (city) - Amfilochia) passes through the town. Nydri is a popular tourist town. In the sea in front of Nydri are several small islands including Madouri, Skorpios, Skorpidi and Sparti. The island Skorpios is the property of the Ribolovlev family.

The German archaeologist Wilhelm Dörpfeld, having examined the geographical descriptions of Homer in the Iliad and the Odyssey believed that Lefkada was Homer's Ithaca, and that the palace of Odysseus was located west of Nydri on the south coast of Lefkada. He performed extensive excavations at Nydri and uncovered Mycenaean tombs, walls, ruins and artefacts which supported his hypothesis. Dörpfeld spent the last years of his life at Nydri and he is buried there.

== Population ==
Year	Village population	Community population
1961	694	-
1991	692	-
2001	1,248	1,394
2011	971	1,218
2021	1,110	1,402

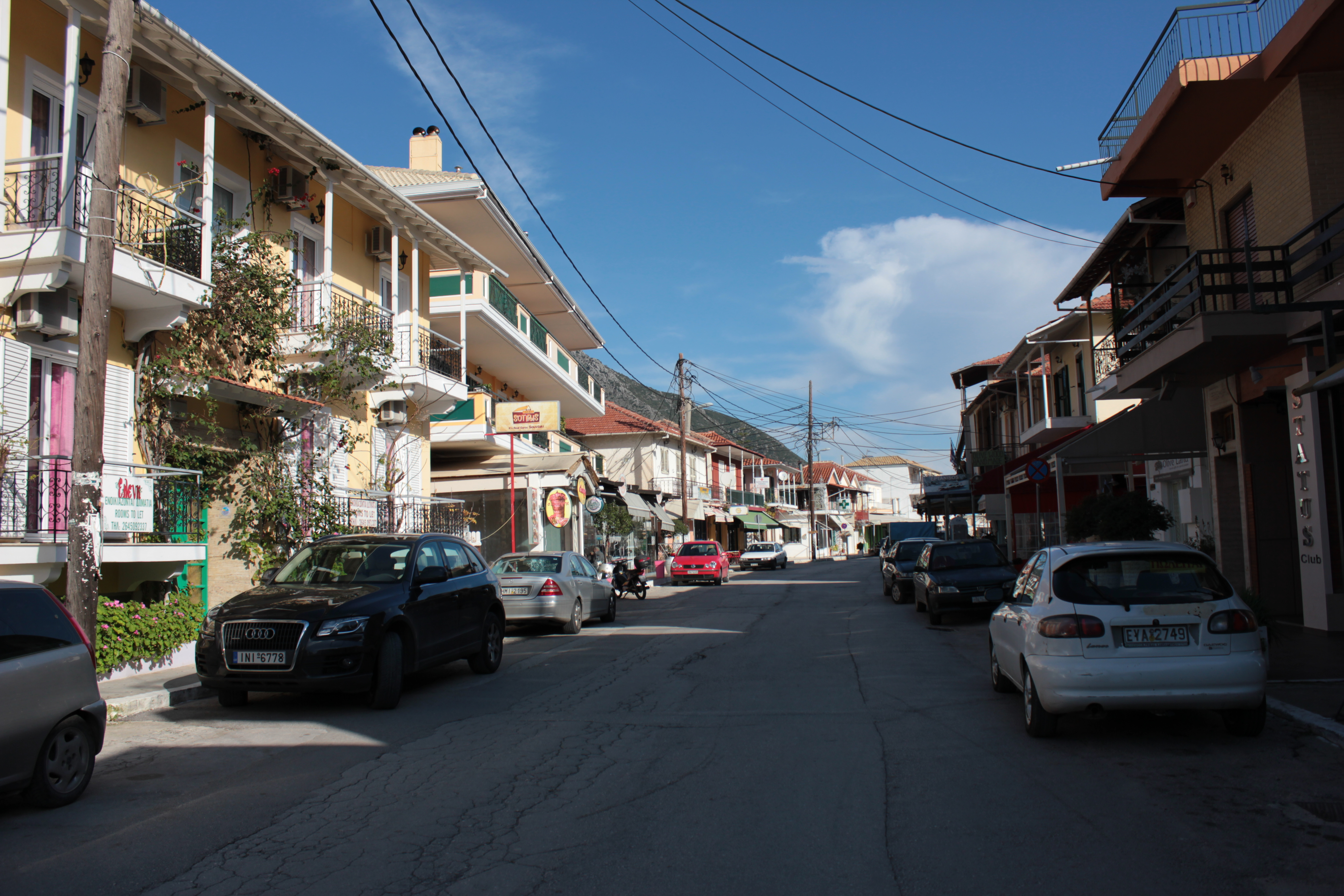
Nydri main street

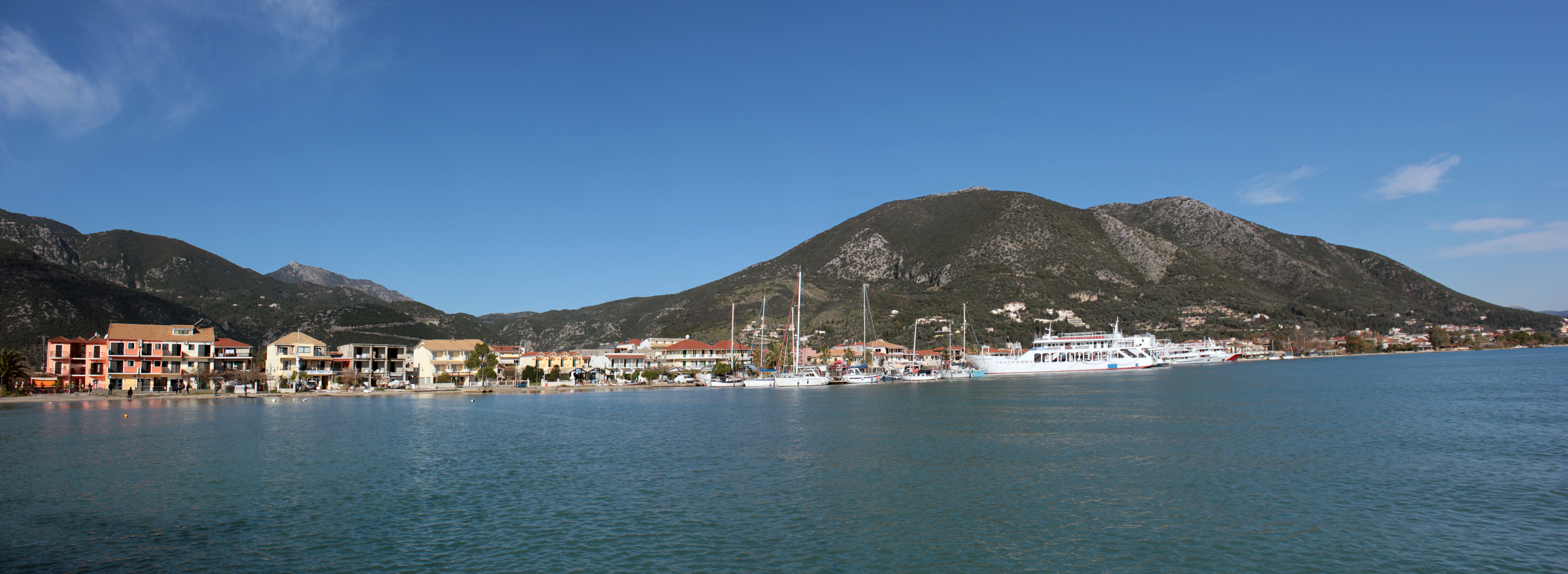
Panorama of Nydri

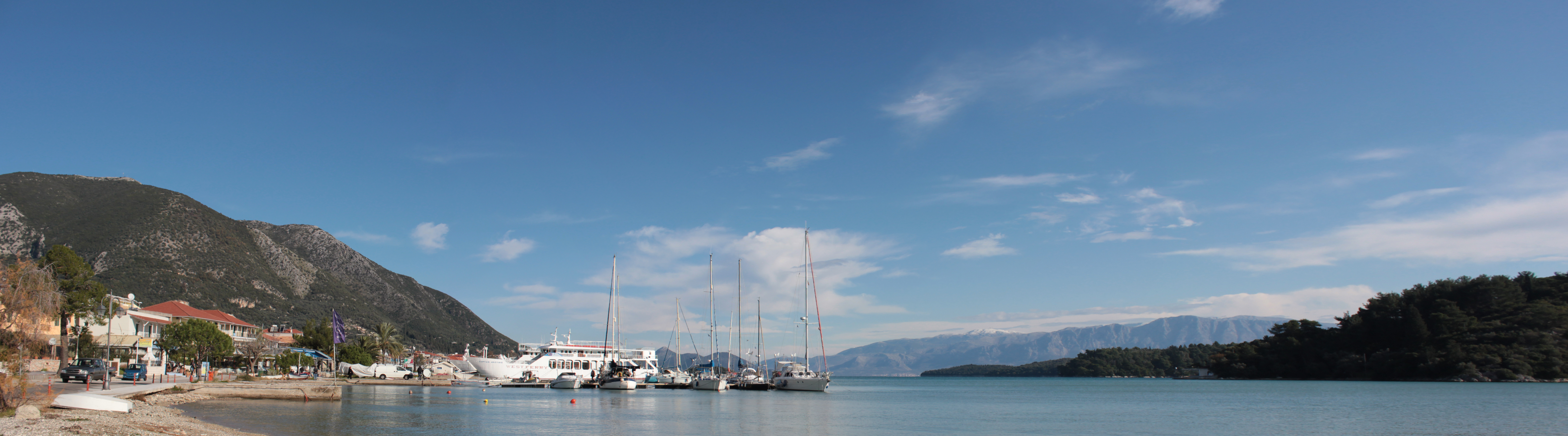
Nydri port
