= Nanos Valaoritis =

Greek writer (1921–2019)

Ioannis (Nanos) Valaoritis (Greek: Ιωάννης (Νάνος) Βαλαωρίτης; 5 July 1921 – 12 September 2019) was a Greek writer, widely published as a poet, novelist and playwright since 1939; his correspondence with George Seferis (Allilographia 1945-1968, Ypsilon, Athens 2004) was a bestseller. The quality, the international appeal, and the influence of his work led Valaoritis to be described as the most important poet of the Hellenic diaspora since Constantine Cavafy.

== Life ==
=== Early years ===
Valaoritis was born to Greek parents in Lausanne in Switzerland in 1921 but grew up in Greece where he studied classics and law at Athens University. He was also writing poetry, and in 1939 when he was barely eighteen, he saw himself published in the pages of George Katsimbalis’ review Nea Grammata alongside contributions from Odysseas Elytis and George Seferis, and was immediately taken into their literary circle. It was an ominous yet heady time, those early months of the war, during which Valaoritis was witness to the seminal encounter of Seferis and Katsimbalis with Henry Miller and Lawrence Durrell, which was to resonate within both Greek and Anglo-Saxon literature for years to come.

=== Training years ===
In 1944 Valaoritis escaped from German-occupied Greece across the Aegean to Turkey and from there through the Middle East to Egypt, where he made contact with Seferis who was serving the Greek government in exile as First Secretary of the Greek Legation in Cairo. In 1944, at the instigation of Seferis, Valaoritis went to London to develop literary links between Greece and Britain. He met T. S. Eliot, W. H. Auden, Dylan Thomas and Stephen Spender, and he worked for Louis MacNeice at the BBC. As well as studying English literature at the University of London, he translated modernist Greek poets, among them Elytis and Embirikos, and contributed to Cyril Connolly's Horizon and to John Lehman's New Writing. His own first volume of collected poems, E Timoria ton Magon (Punishment of Wizards), with decorations by John Craxton, was published in London in 1947. He paved the way for Seferis' success in the English-speaking world by editing and translating, along with Durrell and Bernard Spencer, Seferis' King of Asine which was published in 1948 to enthusiastic reviews.

Then in 1954 he moved to Paris where, as well as studying Mycenaean grammar at the Sorbonne, he was prominent among surrealist poets under André Breton for e.g., Nicolas Calas. Valaoritis met his wife Marie Wilson (1922-2017) one evening at a large gathering in Paris full of Greek writers and artists. Marie Wilson was an American surrealist artist and the author of Apparitions: Paintings and Drawings. Wilson was embedded in the surrealist movement and had a very close relationship with Andre Breton and Picasso. Nanos and Marie moved in together and lived there for six years, leading to marriage, which continued for forty years. They had three children together.

=== Later years ===
After his return to Greece in 1960, he edited the literary review Pali. When the military junta came to power in 1967, he once again chose exile, this time to the United States. Beginning in 1968, he taught comparative literature and creative writing at San Francisco State University for 25 years. He won a National Poetry Association award in 1996. Nanos Valaoritis returned to Greece in 2004, where he has been honored by the Academy of Athens and by the Greek president with the Golden Cross of the Order of Honor, also receiving numerous literary prizes.

== Works ==
=== Poetry ===
- The Punishment of the Mages (Η Τιμωρία των Μάγων, 1947)
- Central Arcade (Κεντρική Στοά, 1958)
- Terre de Diamant 1958
- Hired Hieroglyrhs 1970
- Diplomatic Relations 1971
- Anonymous Poem of Foteinos Saintjohn (Ανώνυμνο Ποίημα του Φωτεινού Αηγιάννη, 1977)
- Εστίες Μικροβίων 1977
- The Hero of Random (Ο Ήρωας του Τυχαίου, 1979)
- Flash Bloom 1980
- The Feathery Confession (Η Πουπουλένια Εξομολόγηση, 1982)
- Some Women (Μερικές Γυναίκες, 1983)
- Ο Διαμαντένιος Γαληνευτής 1981
- Poems 1 (Ποιήματα 1, 1983)
- Στο Κάτω Κάτω της Γραφής 1984
- The Color Pen (Ο Έγχρωμος Στυλογράφος, 1986)
- Poems 2 (Ποιήματα 2 1987)
- Anideograms (Ανιδεογράμματα, 1996)
- Sun, the Executioner of a Green Thought (Ήλιος, ο δήμιος μιας πράσινης σκέψης, 1996)
- Allegoric Cassandra (Αλληγορική Κασσάνδρα, 1998)

=== Prose ===
- The Traitor of the Written Words (Ο Προδότης του Γραπτού Λόγου, 1980)
- Rising from the Bones (Απ' τα Κόκκαλα Βγαλμένη, 1982)
- Xerxes; Treasure (Ο Θησαυρός του Ξέρξη, 1984)
- The Murder (Η Δολοφονία, 1984)
- The Talking Ape or Paramythologia (Ο Ομιλών Πίθηκος ή Παραμυθολογία, 1986)
- My Afterlife Guaranteed, 1990
- Paramythologia (Παραμυθολογία, 1996)
- God's Dog (Ο Σκύλος του Θεού, 1998)

=== Essays ===
- Andreas Empeirikos (Ανδρέας Εμπειρίκος, 1989)
- To a Theory of Writing (Για μια Θεωρία της Γραφής, 1990)
- Modernism, Avant Garde, and Pali (Μοντερνισμός, Πρωτοπορία και Πάλι, 1997)
- Aristotelis Valaoritis, A Romantic (Αριστοτέλης Βαλαωρίτης, Ένας Ρομαντικός, 1998)

== See also ==
- Aristotelis Valaoritis (the great-grandfather of Nanos Valaoritis)
