= The Rain Before It Falls =

2007 novel by Jonathan Coe

- First edition
- Author: Jonathan Coe
- Publisher: Viking Press
- Publication date: 2007
- Pages: 277 pp.
- ISBN: 9780670917334
- Dewey Decimal: 823/.914
- LC Class: PR6053.O26 R35 2007

The Rain Before It Falls is a lyrical novel written by British author Jonathan Coe. It describes the history of three generations of women directly or indirectly affected by events in post-war London and rural Shropshire. The novel contrasts with Coe's previous works in that it is almost apolitical, examining both the welcome and the undesirable legacies parents leave their children.

The title comes from a tune by jazz composer Michael Gibbs.

Most of the story is told through recordings of an old lady called Rosamond who describes on tape twenty photographs that represent a family's history. The main part of the book consists of descriptions of the various photographs, framed by a background story. While each of these descriptions comprises a chapter there is also a central chapter interrupting this structure which gives a piece of the background story.

The book was first published in 2007 by the Penguin Group.
