= Michel Leclerc =

French director and screenwriter (born 1965)

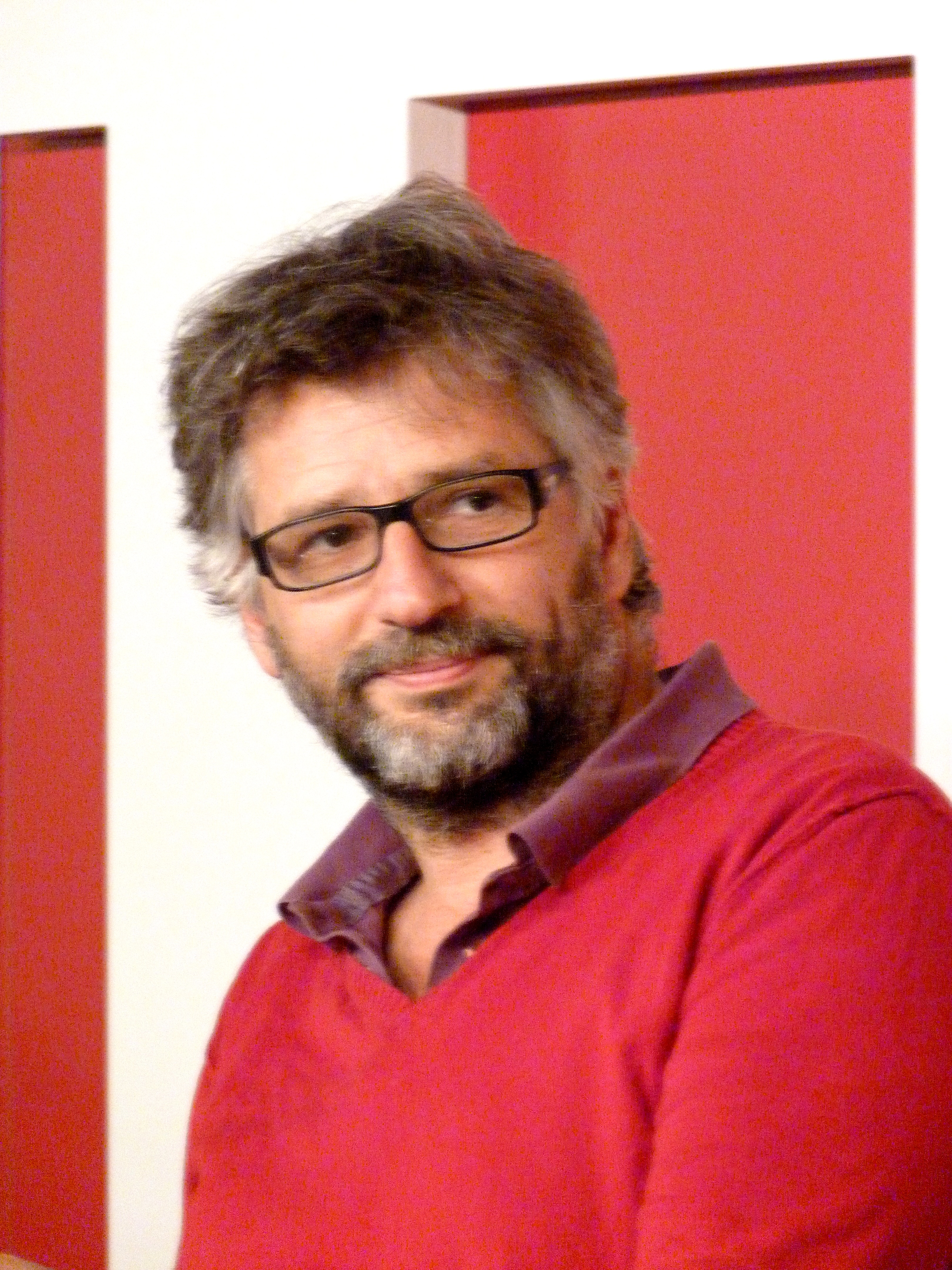
- Michel Leclerc in 2011
- Born: 24 April 1965 (age 61); Paris, France
- Occupations: Director, screenwriter
- Years active: 1989–present
- Partner: Baya Kasmi

Michel Leclerc (French: [miʃɛl ləklɛʁ]; born 24 April 1965) is a French director and screenwriter.

== Career ==
During the 1990s, Leclerc worked as a TV editor and cameraman. He also wrote and directed a number of shorts. For years, he was a columnist on television shows such as C'est ouvert le samedi and Nulle part ailleurs on Canal+, and Mon Kanar on France 3. He is also the singer and songwriter of the group Minaro. In 2011, he won the César Award for Best Original Screenplay for the film The Names of Love.

== Filmography ==
Year	Title	Credited as		Notes
Year	Title	Director	Screenwriter	Notes
1989	Le Test Robert	Yes	Yes	Animated short film
1993	Le Mal en patience	Yes	Yes	Short film
1994	Hélène et Lulu	Yes	Yes	Short film
1996	Le Tutu	Yes	Yes	Short film
1997	Oh la la la la	Yes	Yes	Short film
1999	Facture détaillée	Yes	Yes	Short film
2001	Les Chimères de Švankmajer	Yes		Documentary film
2002	Le Poteau Rose	Yes	Yes	Short film (also as cinematographer, sound engineer, actor, editor and composer); Clermont-Ferrand International Short Film Festival - Special Mention of the Jury
2002	College Days		Yes	TV series
2003	La Valse des étiquettes	Yes	Yes	Short film
2006	J'invente rien	Yes	Yes	
2007	La Tête de maman		Yes	
2010	The Names of Love	Yes	Yes	Cabourg Film Festival - Audience Award; César Award for Best Original Screenplay; Nominated—César Award for Best Film; Nominated—Lumière Award for Best Screenplay; Nominated—Globes de Cristal Award for Best Film
2012	Pirate TV	Yes	Yes	
2014	Fais pas ci, fais pas ça	Yes	Yes	TV series
2015	Les Chaises musicales		Yes	
2015	I'm All Yours		Yes	Also as actor
2015	The Very Private Life of Mister Sim	Yes	Yes	
