= Race Across the World series 6 =

Sixth series of Race Across the World

Race Across the World
- Series 6
- Presented by: John Hannah (narrator)
- No. of days: 51
- No. of contestants: 10
- Winners: Jo Diop and Kush Burman
- No. of legs: 8
- Distance traveled: 12,000 km (7,500 mi)
- Companion show: Race Across the World: The Detour
- No. of episodes: 9

Release
- Original network: BBC One
- Original release: 2 April – 21 May 2026

Additional information
- Filming dates: September 2025 – October 2025

Season chronology
- ← Previous; Series 5 Next → Series 7

The sixth series of Race Across the World began airing on 2 April 2026. The racers start from Palermo in Sicily, and travel 12,000km across Europe and Asia to finish in Hatgal by Lake Hövsgöl in Mongolia.

The five pairs of contestants are Jo & Kush, Katie & Harrison, Molly & Andrew, Puja & Roshni, and Mark & Margo.

Start and end points
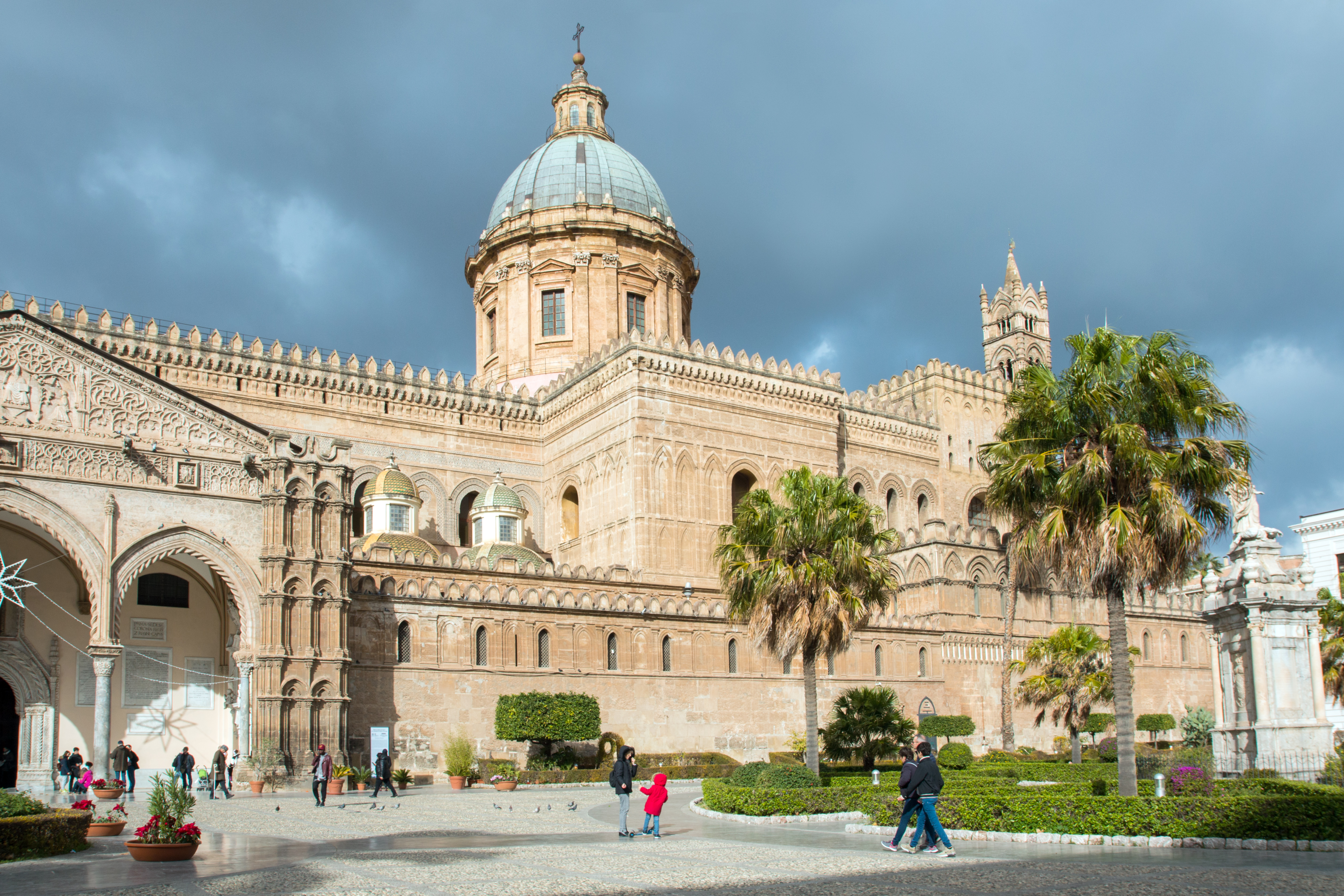
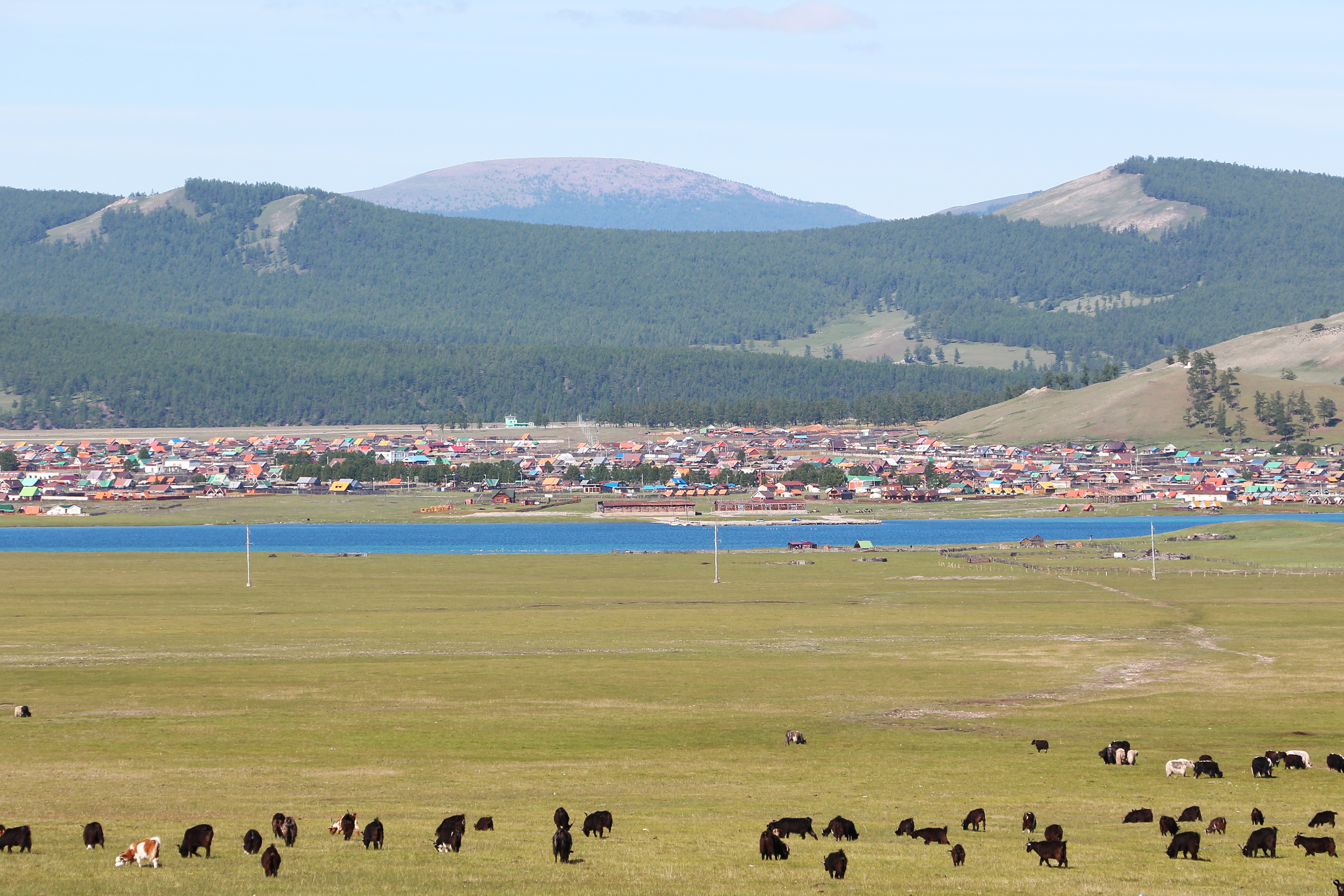
Palermo Cathedral, Palermo, Italy (top) and Hatgal, Mongolia (bottom)

== Overview ==
The teams in the sixth series of Race Across the World raced from Palermo in Italy to Hatgal in Mongolia, a distance of over 12,000 km, passing through Greece, Turkey, Georgia, Kazakhstan, Uzbekistan, and Kyrgyzstan. The route retraced the Silk Road for much of its journey and took the teams through extreme temperatures, from 30°C in the Mediterranean to minus 20°C in Mongolia. The teams are given £1,297 each, or £23.16 per person per day, the cost of flying the route. Filming took place in September and October 2025.

A companion podcast Race Across the World: The Detour was announced on 12 March, with previous Celebrity Race Across the World series 2 winner Scott Mills scheduled to present with Race Across the World series 4 winner Alfie Watts. Watts' contribution was scheduled to include a segment featuring tips for travellers. Following Mills' dismissal from the BBC, former contestant Tyler West was announced as the replacement host on the day of the series' launch. The first episode featured West's partner Molly Rainford and Kola Bokinni, also both former contestants; a further BBC Sounds-exclusive episode also featured Yinka Bokinni.

== Contestants ==
Name	Relationship	Occupation	Age	From	Ref.
Jo Diop	Childhood best friends	Student	19	Liverpool	
Kush Burman	Childhood best friends	Student	19	Liverpool	
Katie Devine	Brother and sister	Account manager	21	Manchester	
Harrison Devine	Brother and sister	Finance assistant	23	Manchester	
Molly Clifford	Daughter and Father	Junior doctor	23	Maghera	
Andrew Clifford	Daughter and Father	Teacher	54	Maghera	
Puja Khajuria	Cousins	Doctor	31	London	
Roshni Ghelani	Cousins	Software engineer	32	London	
Mark Blythen	In Laws	Retired architect	66	London	
Margo Oakley	In Laws	Hypnotherapist	59	Liverpool	

== Results summary ==
Colour key:

– Team eliminated
– Series winners

Teams	Position (by leg)							
Teams	1	2	3	4	5	6	7	8
Jo & Kush	2nd	5th	3rd	2nd	2nd	1st	1st	Winners
Andrew & Molly	3rd	4th	4th	3rd	3rd	3rd	2nd	2nd
Katie & Harrison	1st	1st	1st	4th	1st	4th	3rd	3rd
Mark & Margo	4th	3rd	2nd	1st	4th	2nd	4th	4th
Puja & Roshni	5th	2nd	5th					

== Route ==
Leg	From	To
1	Palermo Cathedral Square; Palermo, Sicily, Italy	Emelisse Nature Resort; Fiskardo, Kefalonia, Greece
2	Emelisse Nature Resort; Fiskardo, Kefalonia, Greece	Legacy Ottoman Hotel; Istanbul, Turkey
3	Legacy Ottoman Hotel; Istanbul, Turkey	Rumkale Cam Teras; Halfeti, Turkey
4	Rumkale Cam Teras; Halfeti, Turkey	Qarvasla Hotel; Tbilisi, Georgia
5	Aktau International Airport; Aktau, Kazakhstan	Zamindor Resort Hotel; Zaamin National Park, Uzbekistan
6	Zamindor Resort Hotel; Zaamin National Park, Uzbekistan	Almaty Hotel; Almaty, Kazakhstan
7	Ulgii International Airport; Ulgii, Mongolia	Ikh Khorum Hotel; Kharkhorin, Mongolia
8	Ikh Khorum Hotel; Kharkhorin, Mongolia	Camp Ashihai; Hatgal, Mongolia

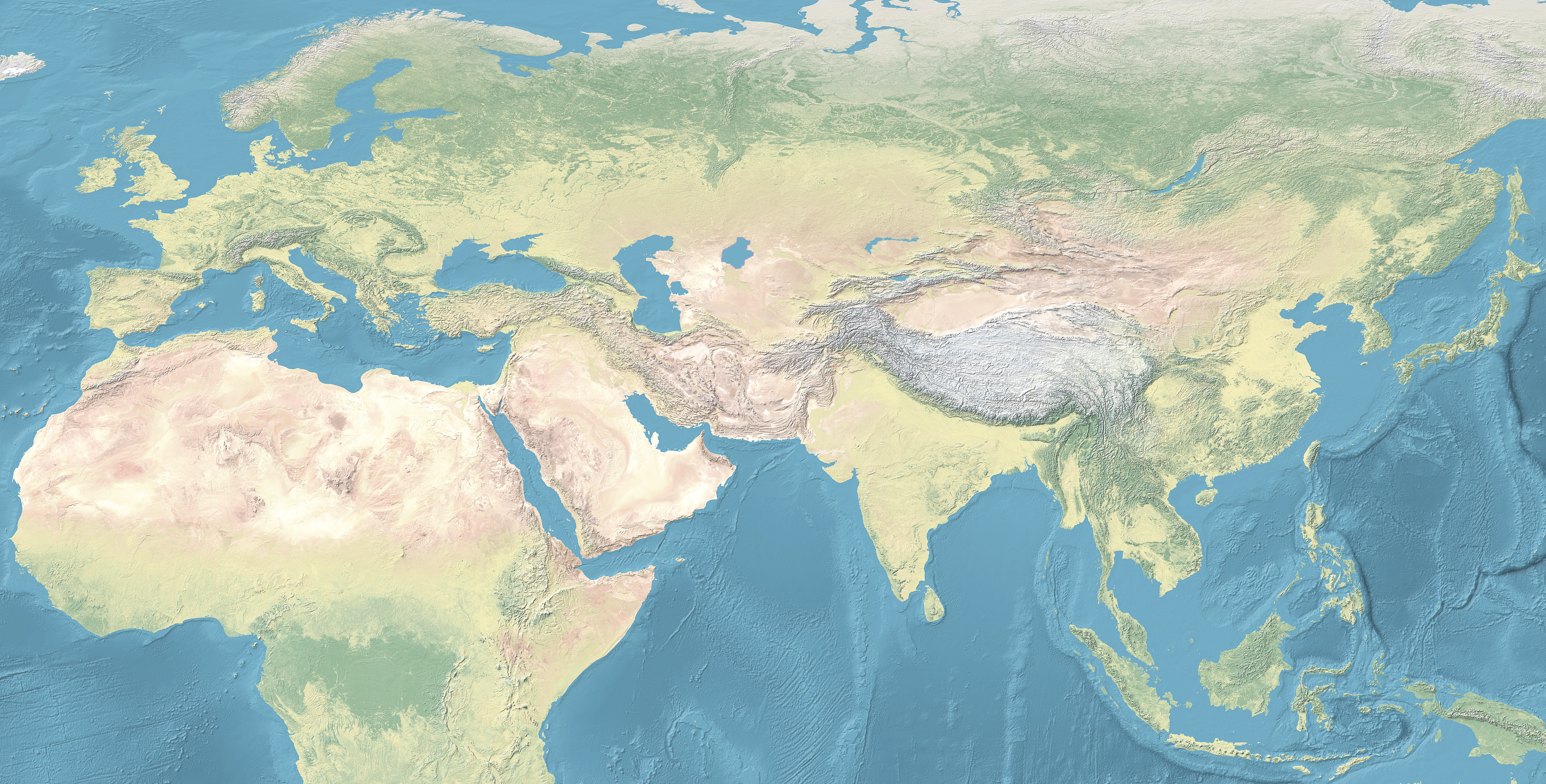
Checkpoints on Series 6: Checkpoint, Start, Resume, Finish

== Race summary ==
Mode of transportation	Rail Ferry / Ship Bus / coach / Minibus Taxi Private car (free or paid) Aeroplane Boat
Activity	Working for money and/or bed and board Excursion that cost time and money

=== Leg 1: Palermo, Italy → Fiskardo, Greece ===
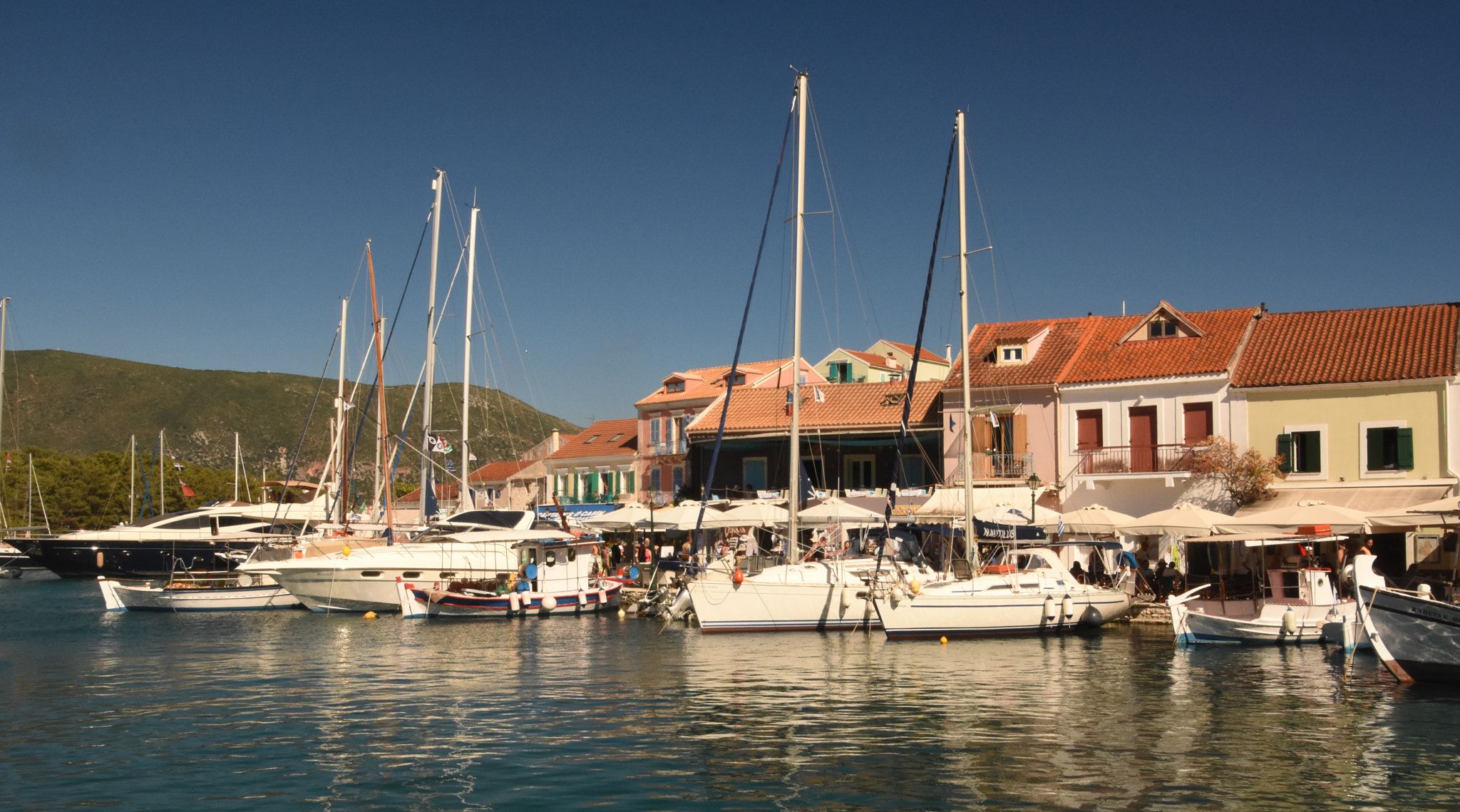
Fiskardo, Kefalonia

The final destination of the race was revealed to the teams to be Hatgal, Mongolia and the first checkpoint was to be Fiskardo, on the island of Kefalonia, Greece in the Ionian Sea. The race started from the piazza outside Palermo Cathedral in Palermo at 3pm. From the starting point of Palermo, the teams could either take a ferry direct across the Tyrrhenian Sea to Naples – Katie & Harrison and Jo & Kush did this – or head by land to Messina and cross to Villa San Giovanni in Calabria, which Andrew & Molly, Puja & Roshni and Mark & Margo opted for.

Upon reaching the Italian mainland, Katie & Harrison took a job in Naples in order to make back some of the money from taking the expensive ferry, while Jo & Kush went to Sorrento working for bed and board. Andrew & Molly, Puja & Roshni and Mark & Margo all made stops along the route from Calabria to the Adriatic ports for sightseeing. Mark & Margo, however, found themselves stuck in the UNESCO World Heritage Site of Alberobello for two nights. File:Fiskardo S Fishing Boats (222128669).jpeg Then, teams all had to cross the Adriatic Sea by ferry to Greece, with Katie & Harrison, Jo & Kush and Andrew & Molly opting for the Bari–Patras crossing and then a short hop west to Kefalonia, and Mark & Margo and Puja & Roshni taking the Brindisi–Igoumenitsa ferry and then island-hopping via Lefkada to the checkpoint. Katie & Harrison, who were the first to reach Patras, saw an opportunity to go to Kyllini and catch an earlier ferry to Kefalonia, managed to finish hours ahead of the others.

Order	Teams	Route	Time behind leaders	Money left
1	Katie & Harrison	Palermo → Naples → Bari → Patras → Kyllini → Poros → Fiskardo	—N/a	78%
2	Jo & Kush	Palermo → Naples → Sorrento → Naples → Bari → Patras → Sami → Fiskardo	20h 12mins	81%
3	Andrew & Molly	Palermo → Messina → Villa San Giovanni → Maratea → Bari → Patras → Sami → Fiskardo	20h 18mins	79%
4	Mark & Margo	Palermo → Messina → Villa San Giovanni → Alberobello → Monopoli → Brindisi → Igoumenitsa → Vasiliki → Fiskardo	20h 22mins	75%
5	Puja & Roshni	Palermo → Messina → Villa San Giovanni → Diamante → Taranto → Brindisi → Igoumenitsa → Vasiliki → Fiskardo	20h 37mins	77%

=== Leg 2: Fiskardo, Greece → Istanbul, Turkey ===
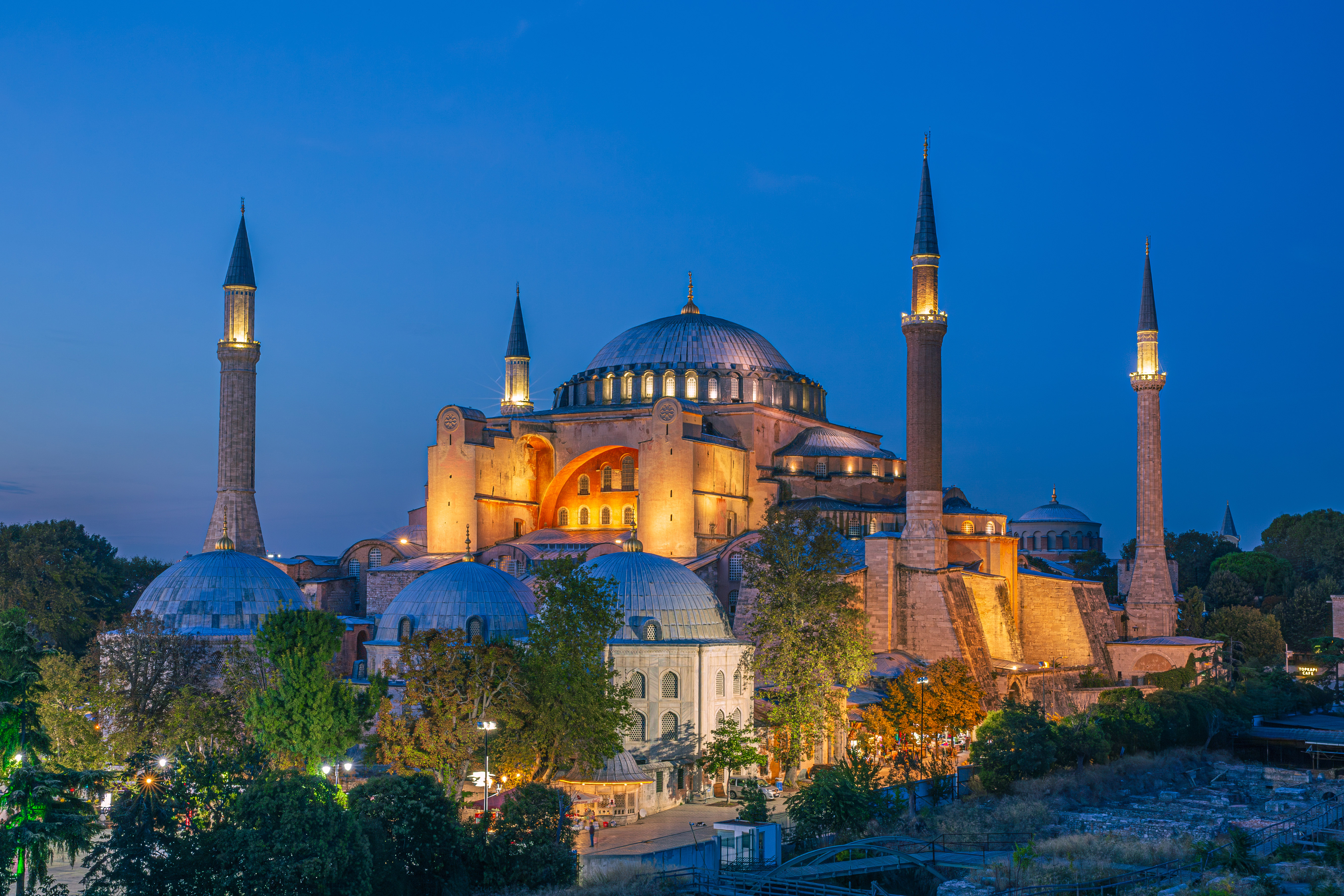
Istanbul, Turkey

The teams had two main routes open to them to reach the second checkpoint: they could go overland through the north of mainland Greece via Thessaloniki, or head for the busy port of Piraeus in Athens and island-hop across the Aegean Sea to reach Turkey.

Budget-conscious Katie & Harrison opted for the former, and worked two jobs along their route in order to further save on costs, in Ioannina and Thessaloniki. Mark & Margo also travelled via the north because Mark wanted to see the monasteries at Meteora, having been pushed ahead by a lift all the way to Ioannina from Vasiliki; similarly Andrew & Molly travelled overland via Larissa in order to pass by Mount Olympus.

Puja & Roshni opted for the sea route, heading directly for Athens and booking a ferry to the island of Chios, just 7km away from the Turkish coast. They attempted to find work in Athens whilst waiting for their ferry but were unsuccessful, picking up work in Chios instead washing a car. They then, in quick succession, got the ferry to Çeşme, bus to İzmir and beelined for Istanbul.

Jo & Kush had a similar idea, taking a ferry from Athens to the island of Lesbos, picking up work there with a local fisherman. They then took the ferry to Ayvalık, however upon getting there they had trouble with buses to Istanbul being sold out, holding them back significantly.

Order	Teams	Route	Time behind leaders	Money left
1	Katie & Harrison	Fiskardo → Vasiliki → Lefkada → Preveza → Ioannina → Thessaloniki → Istanbul	—N/a	68%
2	Puja & Roshni	Fiskardo → Vasiliki → Lefkada → Athens → Chios → Çeşme → İzmir → Istanbul	14h 20m	
3	Mark & Margo	Fiskardo → Vasiliki → Preveza → Ioannina → Meteora → Thessaloniki → Istanbul	23h 24m	64%
4	Andrew & Molly	Fiskardo → Vasiliki → Lefkada → Athens → Larissa → Litochoro (Mount Olympus) → Thessaloniki → Istanbul	24h 4m	66%
5	Jo & Kush	Fiskardo → Vasiliki → Lefkada → Athens → Mytilini → Ayvalık → Istanbul	31h 20m	

=== Leg 3: Istanbul, Turkey → Halfeti, Turkey ===
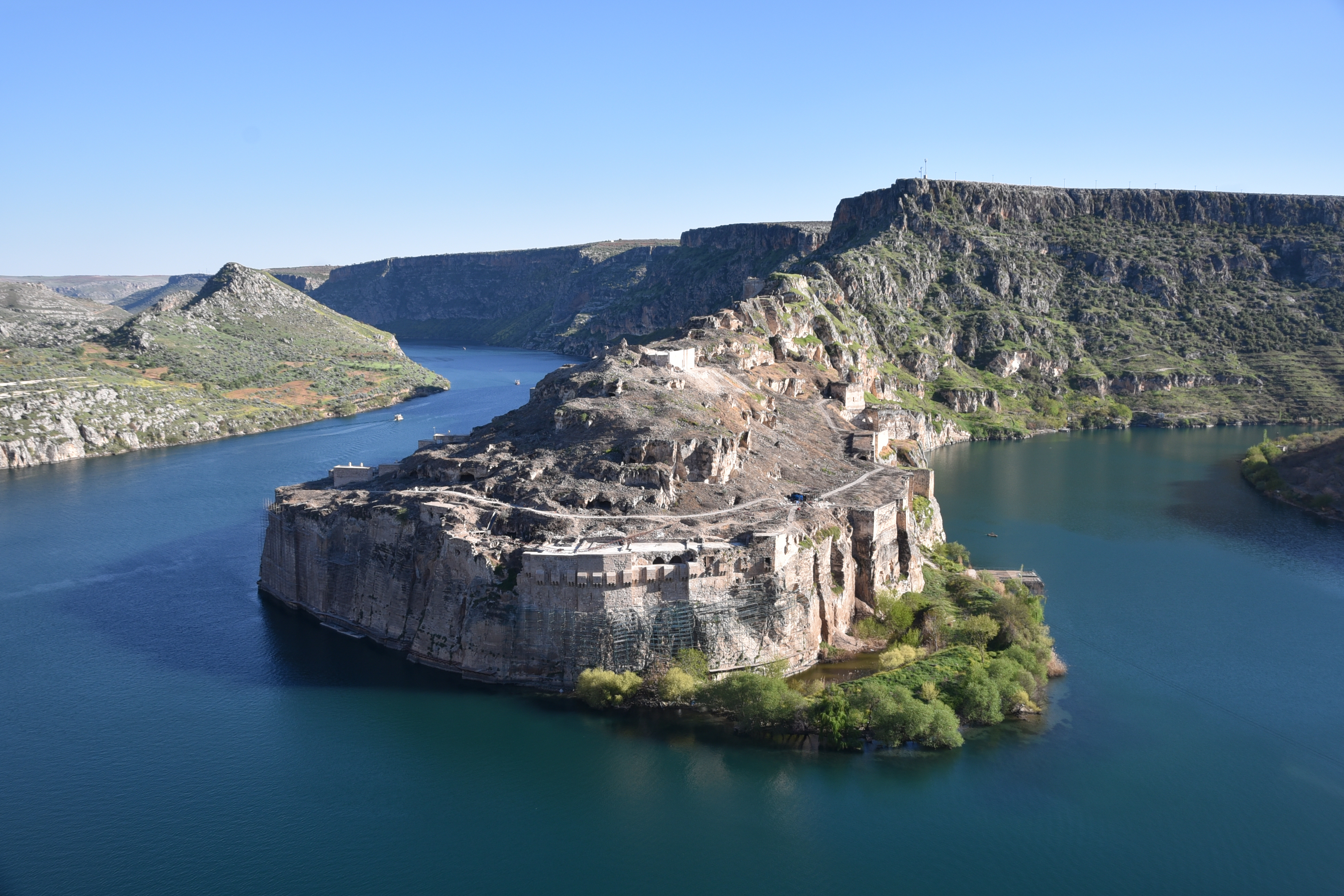
Rumkale near Halfeti

The teams were informed in Istanbul that the next checkpoint would be Halfeti, in the southeast of Turkey, and that the last team to arrive at the checkpoint would be eliminated.

Katie and Harrison, leaving with a 14-hour lead on their next closest competitors, opted to make a detour to Cappadocia for sightseeing, travelling via Eskişehir to get there. They were the first to reach the checkpoint, which was the viewing platform overlooking Rumkale castle near Halfeti.

Meanwhile, Puja and Roshni opted to head along the Mediterannean coast, intending to first head for Ortaca, Muğla Province, to work in a turtle sanctuary. However, since there were no direct buses there from Istanbul, they made a sizeable detour westward to the hub of İzmir in order to head to Ortaca, costing them significant time. They were then held up in the city of Antalya, pushing them to the back of the pack and leading them to their elimination.

Mark and Margo, for speed reasons, travelled by bus to Ankara and then utilised Turkey's YHT high-speed trains to get to Konya. They stayed in Konya to sightsee for a while, then made a straight shot for Gaziantep and Halfeti. Similarly, Andrew and Molly tried to go as directly as possible, travelling via the coastal cities of Antalya and Adana, spending time in the former.

Jo and Kush, leaving 31 hours behind Katie and Harrison, were very worried about the impending elimination, and opted to disregard budget concerns and to travel as fast as possible, going by bus via Alanya to Mersin and then spending 10% of their total budget on taxis from Mersin to Gaziantep to Halfeti, pushing them into third place.

Order	Teams	Route	Time behind leaders	Money left
1	Katie & Harrison	Istanbul → Eskişehir → Göreme (Cappadocia) → Gaziantep → Halfeti → Rumkale	—N/a	56%
2	Mark & Margo	Istanbul → Ankara → Konya → Gaziantep → Halfeti → Rumkale	9h 44m	57%
3	Jo & Kush	Istanbul → Alanya → Mersin → Gaziantep → Halfeti → Rumkale	10h 22m	47%
4	Andrew & Molly	Istanbul → Antalya → Adana → Gaziantep → Halfeti → Rumkale	13h 58m	57%
5	Puja & Roshni	Istanbul → İzmir → Ortaca → Antalya → Halfeti → Rumkale	26h 07m	

=== Leg 4: Halfeti, Turkey → Tbilisi, Georgia ===
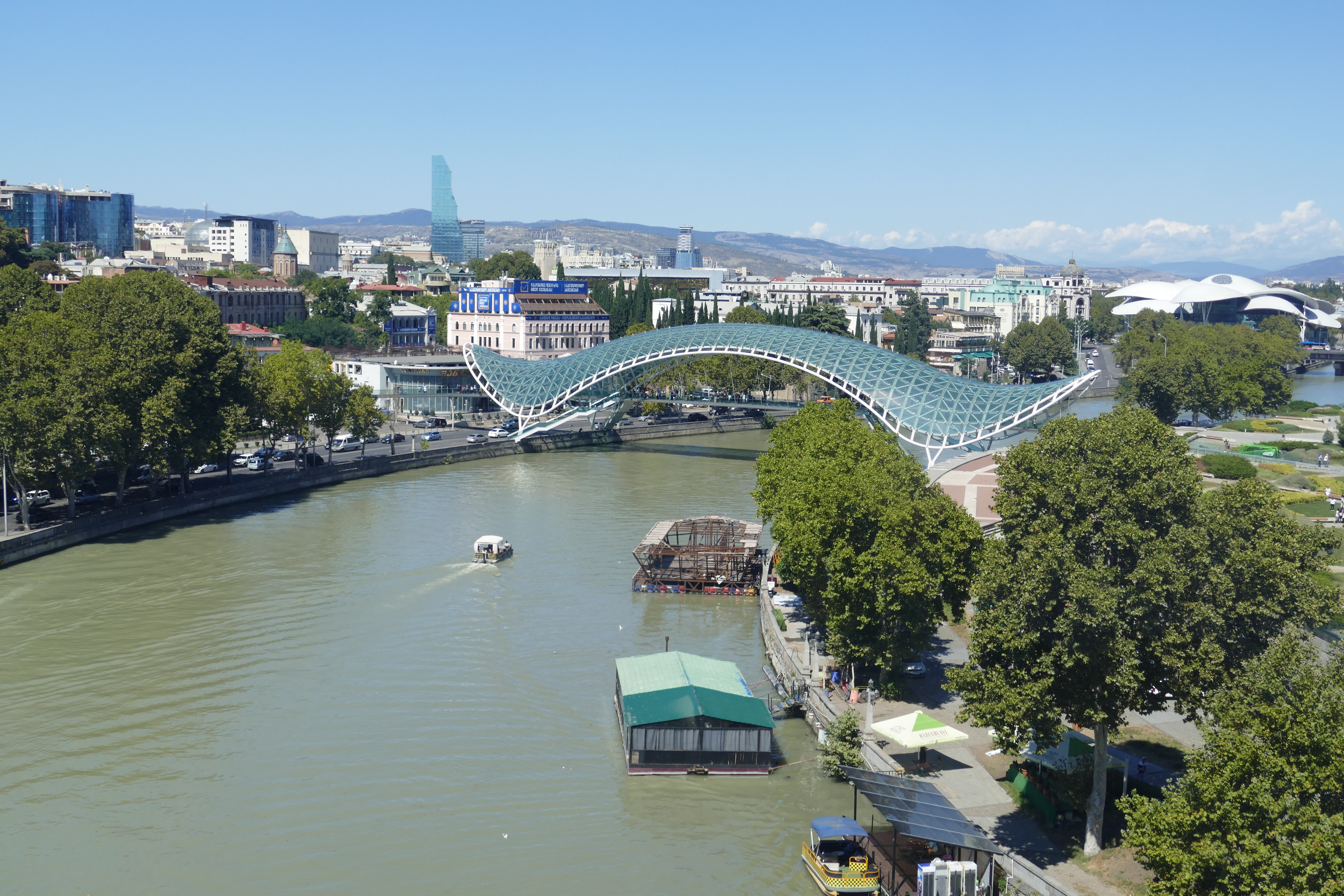
Tbilisi, Georgia

Upon leaving the checkpoint, teams were informed the next one would be Tbilisi, Georgia. All teams initially took a minibus to the hub of Şanlıurfa.

Katie and Harrison were the first team to leave, however they were hindered by the lack of overnight transport out of Halfeti, having to stay another night. They then waited for an overnight bus in Şanlıurfa to the northern city of Samsun, in the hopes of cheap accommodation and swift onward transport along the Black Sea into Georgia. Staying at a homestay, they then took a bus to the town of Hopa near the Georgian border, however there they were again hindered, having to stay two nights due to the lack of buses across the border, thus driving them to last place.

Mark and Margo immediately decided to route themselves via Van in order to see some Van cats, heading directly there. They went thence to the eastern border crossing at Vale and to the city of Akhaltsikhe, where Mark fell ill, forcing them to stop for nearly a day. In order to make up some time, they took a costly taxi on to the capital, meaning despite their hindrance they came in first.

Jo and Kush took the same minibus as Mark & Margo as far as Şanlıurfa, then headed east to Mardin, where they were able to find free accommodation in exchange for work. They then headed to the city of Susuz near the border, where they worked before crossing the border and taking a taxi from Vale to Tbilisi, arriving just behind Mark and Margo.

Finally, Andrew and Molly had a more tumultuous leg due to arguments and forced rerouting. From Şanlıurfa, Andrew wanted to go to Mount Nemrut, which they did. From there, they headed to the hub of Tatvan, where they then got conflicting information on the fastest route into Georgia, deciding to head to Erzurum the next morning and thence to Hopa. However, on the bus from Erzurum to Hopa they were advised by the driver to instead disembark in Rize and get an overnight bus from there to Tbilisi. This they did, eventually ending up third.

Order	Teams	Route	Time behind leaders	Money left
1	Mark & Margo	Halfeti → Şanlıurfa → Van → Ardahan → Akhaltsikhe → Tbilisi	—N/a	42%
2	Jo & Kush	Halfeti → Şanlıurfa → Mardin → Susuz → Posof → Vale → Tbilisi	1h 30m	
3	Andrew & Molly	Halfeti → Şanlıurfa → Mt Nemrut → Tatvan → Erzurum → Rize → Tbilisi	10h 31m	46%
4	Katie & Harrison	Halfeti → Şanlıurfa → Samsun → Hopa → Tbilisi	19h 53m	45%

=== Leg 5: Tbilisi, Georgia → Zaamin National Park, Uzbekistan ===
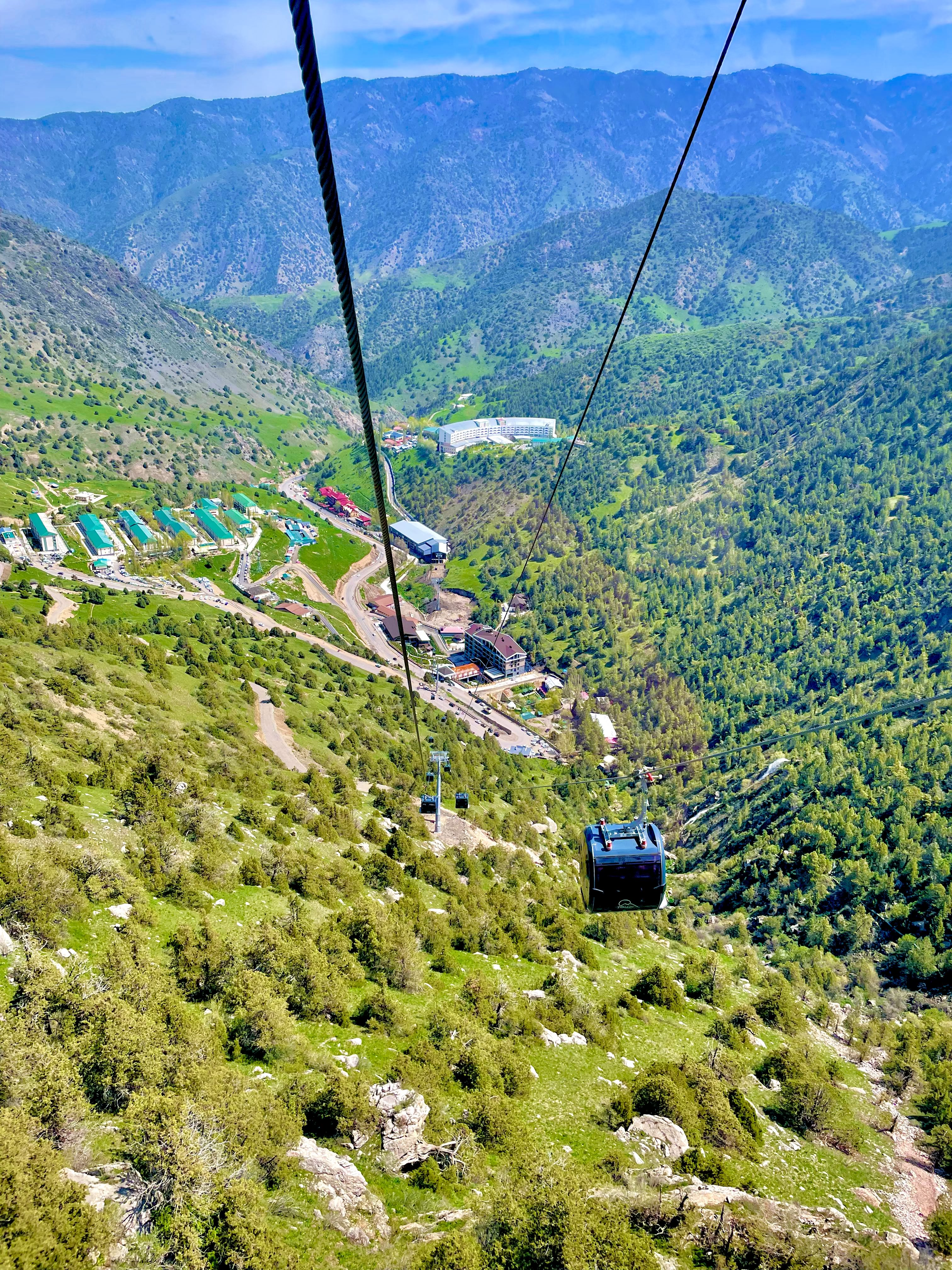
Zaamin National Park, Uzbekistan

Due to the land border between Georgia and Azerbaijan being closed, all teams were flown to Aktau, Kazakhstan, to continue the race. Teams departed from Aktau International Airport according to their order of arrival, and headed to their next check point, which was Zaamin National Park in Uzbekistan.

Teams could either go via a longer and slower route through Kazakhstan, or via shorter routes with less reliable transport links through Uzbekistan. Mark & Margo and Jo & Kush opted for the longer route, while Andrew & Molly and Katie & Harrison chose the shorter one. Mark & Margo were sidetracked by a visit to the shore of the Caspian Sea and ended up with Jo & Kush on the same 29-hour train ride to Kyzylorda. A decision to go directly from the airport to Beyneu saw Katie & Harrison catching up with Andrew & Molly and they shared the same train from Beyneu to Nukus.

After reaching Nukus, Katie & Harrison went to visit the nearby Mizdarkhan burial sites before travelling to Bukhara, while Andrew & Molly went further to visit Khiva, which delayed their travel to Bukhara. After reaching Bukhara, both Katie & Harrison and Andrew & Molly took a taxi to Zaamin National Park, and Katie & Harrison were the first team to reach the checkpoint.

Andrew & Molly worked on a horse farm in Kentau near the city of Turkistan in exchange for bed and board, while Jo & Kush worked at a Sundet Toi party in Turkistan. Both teams then took a taxi to the border and then on to the Zaamin National Park.

Order	Teams	Route	Time behind leaders	Money left
1	Katie & Harrison	Tbilisi → Aktau International Airport → Beyneu → Nukus → Mizdarkhan → Nukus → Bukhara → Zaamin National Park	—N/a	30%
2	Jo & Kush	Tbilisi → Aktau International Airport → Aktau → Kyzylorda → Turkistan → → Zaamin National Park	42 min	29%
3	Andrew & Molly	Tbilisi → Aktau International Airport → Aktau → Beyneu → Nukus → Khiva → Bukhara → Zaamin National Park	3 hr 44 min	37%
4	Mark & Margo	Tbilisi → Aktau International Airport → Aktau → Kyzylorda → Kentau → Zaamin National Park	6 hr 49 min	30%

=== Leg 6: Zaamin National Park, Uzbekistan → Almaty, Kazakhstan ===
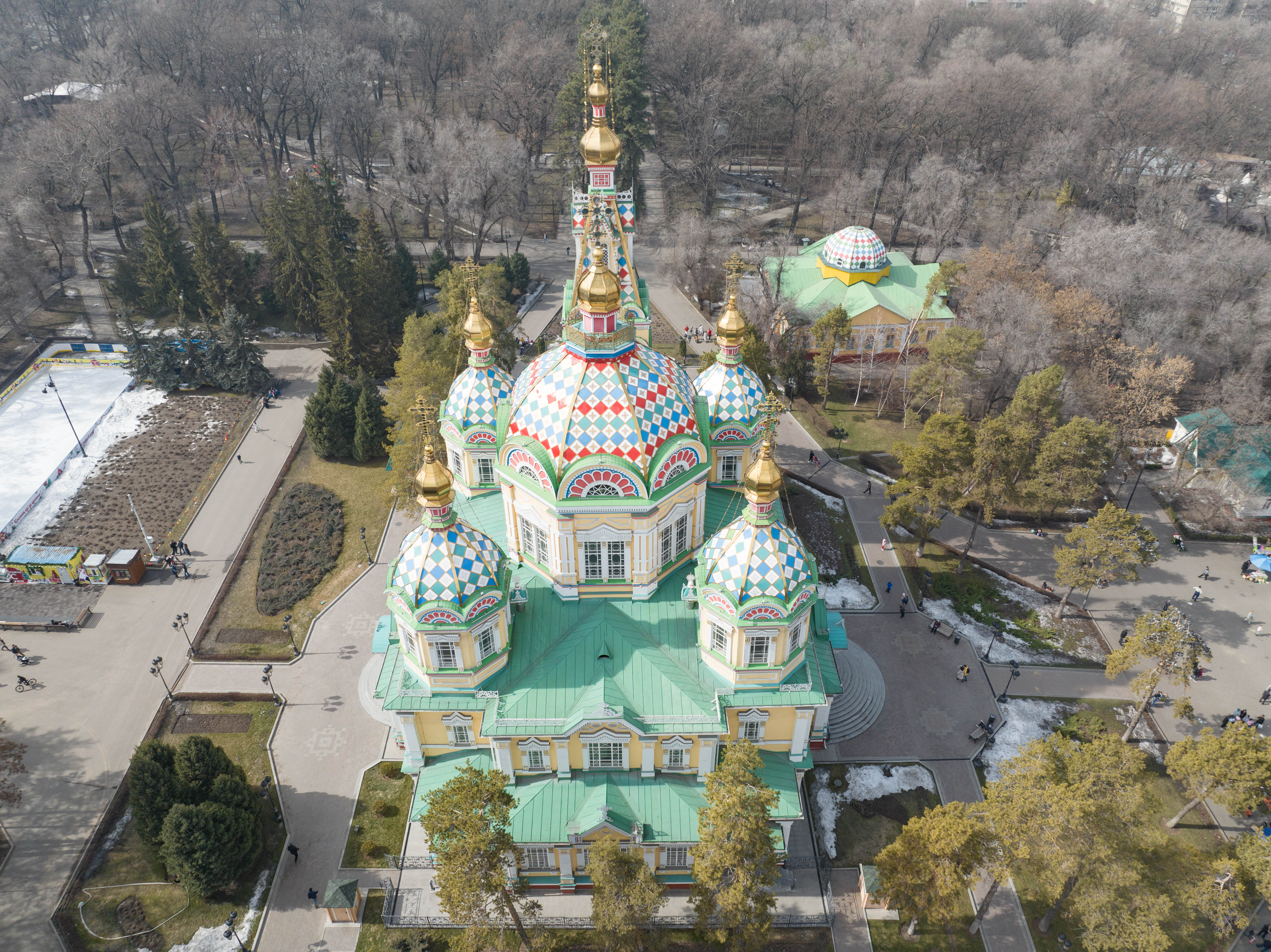
Almaty, Kazakhstan

The teams left their hotel in Zaamin National Park and headed for the next destination, Almaty in Kazakhstan. They could either go via cheaper routes with limited transport through Kyrgyzstan, or more reliable but potentially more expensive route directly through Kazakhstan. Three teams apart from Andrew & Molly opted to go through Kyrgyzstan.

Katie & Harrison took a train from Tashkent to Andijan, but Jo & Kush failed to get a cheap taxi ride to the border had to spend the night near Tashkent. However they met someone who allowed them to spend the night for free at the hotel and pay for their taxi fare to the border the next day. The money saved allowed them to take a taxi to their homestay in Arslanbob where they harvested walnuts. They then secured a cheap taxi ride to Almaty in Kazakhstan, and were the first to reach the checkpoint well ahead of all other teams.

After crossing into Kyrgyzstan, Katie & Harrison were delayed at Osh as they failed to get a cheap bus ride to Bishkek but were unwilling to pay the more expensive taxi fare. The delay allowed Mark & Margo to catch up with Katie & Harrison. Both teams reached Bishkek where Mark & Margo worked as pet groomers, while Katie & Harrison took a detour to Kashka-Suu where they groomed horses in exchange for horse rides through the Kyrgyz Ala-Too Range. This further delayed their journey and Katie & Harrison ended in last place.

Andrew & Molly, took a taxi from Tashkent to the border with Kazakhstan, before travelling to Shymkent where they caught a train to Shu. They stopped at Tasotkel to work on a farm. With their healthy budget, they took a taxi to Almaty and finished third.

Order	Teams	Route	Time behind leaders	Money left
1	Jo & Kush	Zaamin National Park → Zomin → Tashkent → Andijan → → Arslanbob → Jalal-Abad → → Almaty	—N/a	22%
2	Mark & Margo	Zaamin National Park → Zomin → Tashkent → Andijan → Osh → Bishkek → Almaty	14 h 7 min	19%
3	Andrew & Molly	Zaamin National Park → Zomin → Tashkent → Chinoz → Shymkent → Shu → Tasotkel → Almaty	19 h 0 min	30%
4	Katie & Harrison	Zaamin National Park → Zomin → Tashkent → Andijan → Osh → Bishkek → Almaty	21 h 12 min	21%

=== Leg 7: Almaty, Kazakhstan → Kharkhorin, Mongolia ===
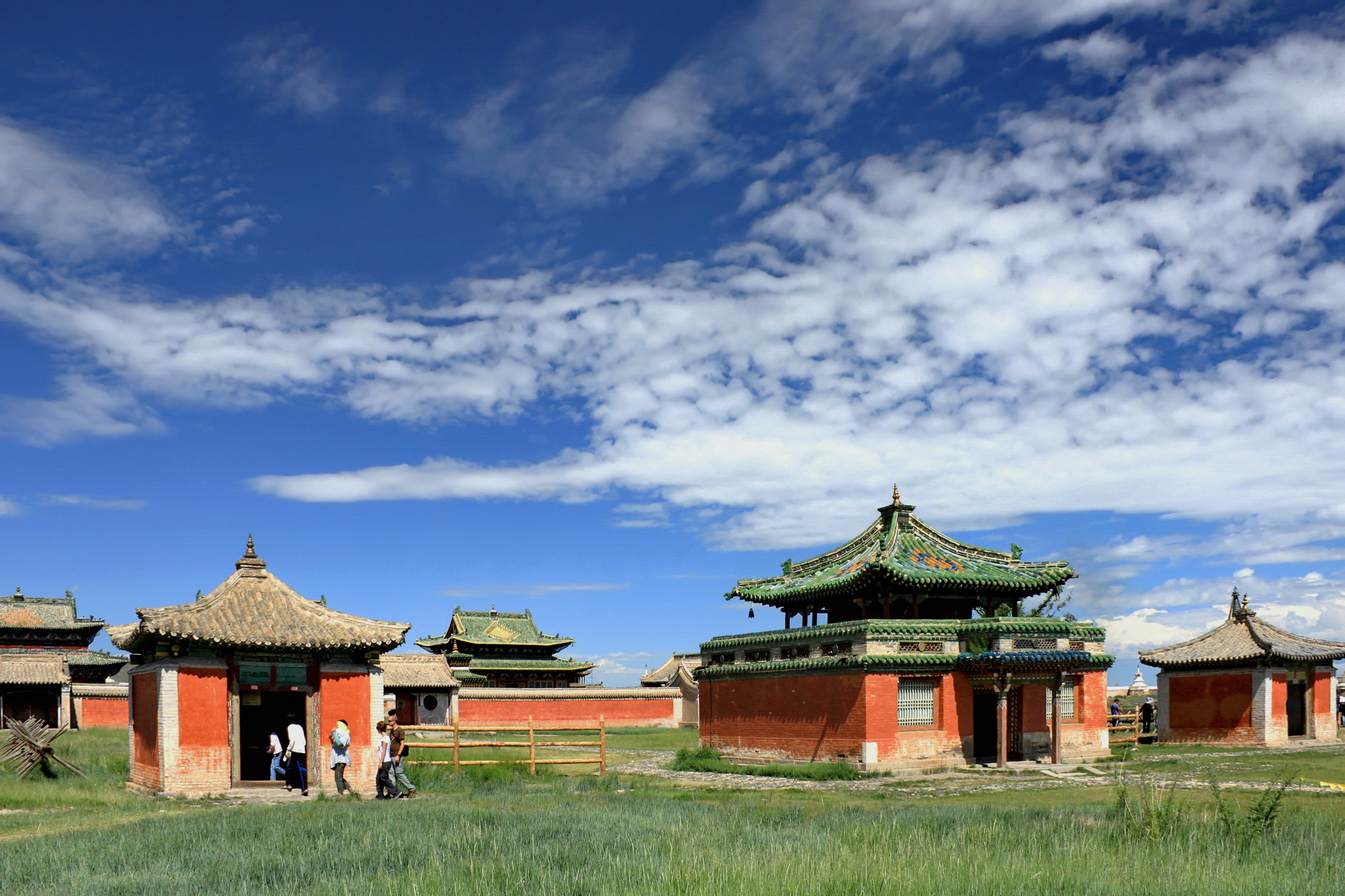
Erdene Zuu Monastery, Kharkhorin

The teams were not able to travel through China, and were flown to Ölgii International Airport in Mongolia to restart the race. Travel through Mongolia, however, may be more troublesome with unreliable maps and infrequent public transport, and some teams may have to use private car that charged them for the ride.

Jo & Kush went straight to Khovd before heading north to Ulaangom and then to Naranbulag for their homestay. They then travelled to Tosontsengel by bus. They finished in first place when they managed to catch a bus in time to Kharkhorin.

Mark & Margo had a similar plan to Jo & Kush, planning to go to Khovd, but stopping overnight in Myangad before going to Ulaangom. However, they found that there was no transport to Ulaangom from Myangad, and had to pay to return to Khovd to stay another night before they can travel to Ulaangom. The unexpected delay and extra cost that depleted their fund resulted in them finishing some time behind the other teams.

Andrew & Molly chose a southern route and went direct to Altanteel for their homestay, planning to use their ample fund to push for the lead. From Altanteel they travelled to Altai and Arvaikheer. They took a taxi from Arvaikheer to Kharkhorin and finished second.

Katie & Harrison opted to go to Darvi via Khovd, with the intention of going to Tosontsengel. However, a lack of buses led to a change of plan, and they went to Bayankhongor via Altai.

Order	Teams	Route	Time behind leaders	Money left
1	Jo & Kush	Almaty → Ölgii International Airport → Khovd → Ulaangom → Naranbulag → Tosontsengel → Kharkhorin	—N/a	16%
2	Andrew & Molly	Almaty → Ölgii International Airport → Altanteel → Altai City → Arvaikheer → Kharkhorin	4 hr 47 min	23%
3	Katie & Harrison	Almaty → Ölgii International Airport → Ulgii → Khovd → Darvi → Altai → Bayankhongor → Kharkhorin	23 hr 7 min	11%
4	Mark & Margo	Almaty → Ölgii International Airport → Ulgii Khovd → Myangad → Khovd → Ulaangom → Tosontsengel → Kharkhorin	35 hr 48 min	9%

=== Leg 8: Kharkhorin → Hatgal ===
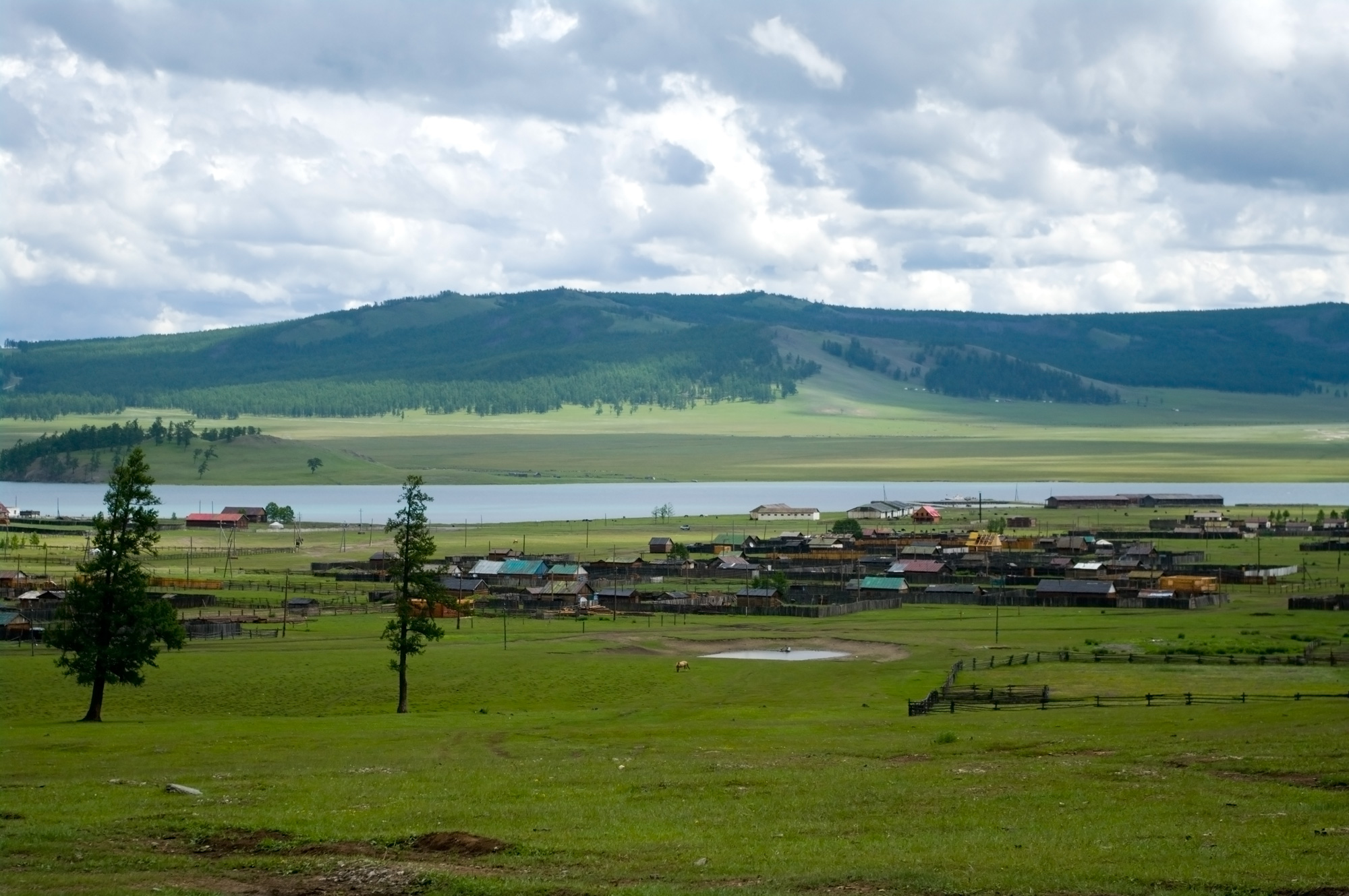
Hatgal

The teams have two choices to reach their destination, Hatgal: they can either travel off-road directly northwards to Hatgal through a remote region, or a more reliable but longer route via Ulaanbaatar. Jo & Kush were the only team to choose the longer route, going to Ulaanbaatar on a private car. However, they found that the train to Erdenet would not depart until the evening the following day, forcing them to work in Ulaanbaatar to help pay for a taxi the next day to Erdenet.

The other three teams all chose the more direct route, first going by car to Tsetserleg. After reaching Tsetserleg, Andrew & Molly intended to take a taxi to Jargalant, Khövsgöl, but error in communication with the taxi driver took them to Jargalant, Arkhangai instead. They had to double back to Khorgo for an overnight stay, before they can go to the correct Jargalant, which delayed their travel for an entire day. When they reached Hatgal, they found that had finished before them by 3 hours.

From Tsetserleg, Katie & Harrison managed to get a free ride to another town before they took a taxi to Shine-Ider. They took a minibus to Hatgal, and finished in third place.

Mark & Margo, who were depleted in cash, faced problems continuing after spending a significant amount on a taxi from Khorgo to Shine-Ider. They managed to secure a cheap shared furgon from Shine-Ider to Murun, which then took them further to Hatgal, allowing them to complete the race.

Order	Teams	Route	Time behind leaders	Money left
1	Jo & Kush	Kharkhorin → Ulaanbaatar → Erdenet → Murun → Hatgal	—N/a	2%
2	Andrew & Molly	Kharkhorin → Tsetserleg → Jargalant, Arkhangai → Khorgo → Jargalant, Khövsgöl → Hatgal	3 hr 2 min	5%
3	Katie & Harrison	Kharkhorin → Tsetserleg → → Shine-Ider → Hatgal	5 hr 42 min	3%
4	Mark & Margo	Kharkhorin → Tsetserleg → Khorgo → Shine-Ider → Murun → Hatgal	30 hr 50 min	1%

== Reception ==
The first episode was praised by The Guardian, The Standard, and The Times, though The Daily Telegraph felt the formula was starting to become too familiar.

=== Ratings ===
Episode no.	Airdate	7 days		28 days	
Episode no.	Airdate	Total viewers (millions)	Ranking (all channels)	Total viewers (millions)	Ranking (all channels)
1	2 April 2026	5.68	1	7.41	1
2	9 April 2026	5.32	3	6.90	1
3	16 April 2026	5.49	1	6.82	1
4	23 April 2026	5.40	1	6.64	1
5	30 April 2026	5.47	1	6.67	1
6	7 May 2026	5.78	1	6.81	1
7	13 May 2026	5.62	1	6.62	1
8	21 May 2026	5.92	1	6.50	1
9	21 May 2026	3.59	10	4.20	5
