= Athani, Greece =

Athani Αθάνι
- Community
- Location within Greece
- Coordinates: 38°40′N 20°34′E
- Country: Greece
- Administrative region: Ionian Islands
- Regional unit: Lefkada
- Municipality: Lefkada
- Municipal unit: Apollonioi

Population (2021)
  - Community: 172
- Time zone: UTC+2 (EET)
  - Summer (DST): UTC+3 (EEST)

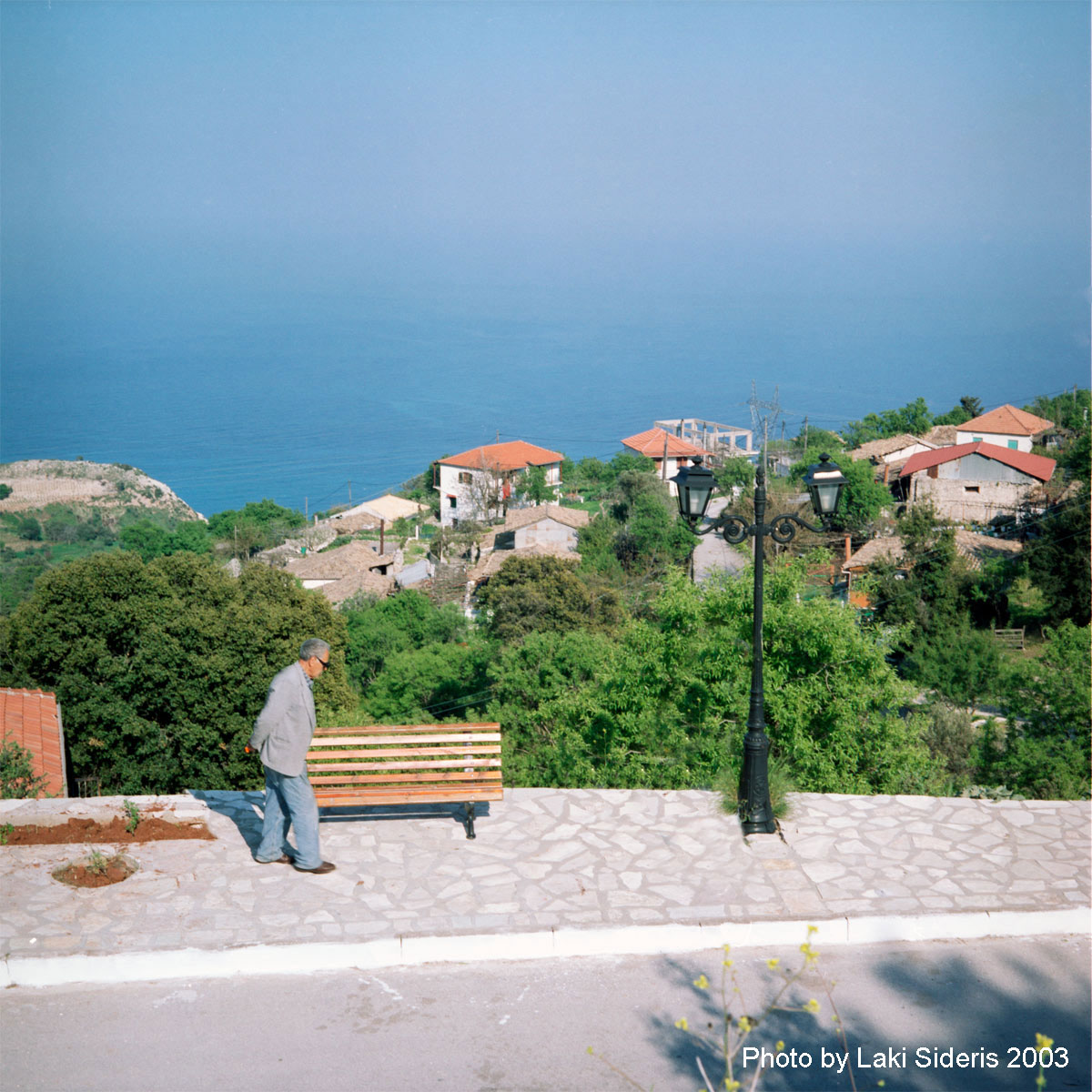
View from the main road, Athani.

Built on a steep incline on the south-west coast of the Greek island of Lefkada, the village of Athani (Greek: Αθάνι) is the southernmost major populated region of the island accessible by sealed road. It is the nearest village to the famed beach of Porto Katsiki.

== Nearest places ==
- Agios Petros, north
- Vassiliki, east

== Subdivisions ==
- Agios Nikolaos Niras (Άγιος Νικόλαος Νηράς) [2011 pop: 9]

== Information ==
The first inhabitants of Athani were from Italy and was first name Azani (Αζάνι). Around 1490, the Spanish speaking Jews arrived in Athani.

From the 1950s until the late 1960s, a significant part of the population emigrated overseas or to the major regional centers within Greece. It has recently been discovered by Europeans and its dwindling population is gradually being fortified by new "blow ins". These new residents make Athani their temporary home during the summer months, leaving the cold and harsh seasons to the local diehards.

Athani is highly regarded for honey as well as its views over the Ionian Sea.

It suffered minor damage during the October 2003 Lefkada earthquake. A 6.5 magnitude earthquake on 17 November 2015 severely damaged property and killed a woman.

== Historical population ==
Year	Population	Community population
1981	232	-
1991	204	-
2011	204	213
2021	167	172

== See also ==
- List of settlements in the Lefkada regional unit
