= Apollonioi =

Apollonioi Απολλώνιοι
- Municipal unit
- Location within the regional unit

- Location within Greece
- Coordinates: 38°38′N 20°36′E
- Country: Greece
- Administrative region: Ionian Islands
- Regional unit: Lefkada
- Municipality: Lefkada
- Districts: 11

Area
  - Municipal unit: 124.709 km^{2} (48.150 sq mi)
- Lowest elevation: 0 m (0 ft)

Population (2021)
  - Municipal unit: 2,389
  - Municipal unit density: 19.16/km^{2} (49.62/sq mi)
- Time zone: UTC+2 (EET)
  - Summer (DST): UTC+3 (EEST)
- Postal code: 310 81
- Area code: 26290
- Vehicle registration: EY
- Website: www.apollonion.gr

Apollonioi (Greek: Απολλώνιοι) is a former municipality on the island of Lefkada, Ionian Islands, Greece. Since the 2011 local government reform it is part of the municipality Lefkada, of which it is a municipal unit. It is located in the southwestern part of the island. Its population was 2,389 at the 2021 census. The seat of the municipality was in Vasiliki. Its area is 124.709 km^{2}, comprising about 41 percent of Lefkada Island. The area features beautiful beaches on the western side of the island, the most famous are in Porto Katsiki and in Ekremnoi. The Porto Katsiki Beach has been voted the second best beach in the world.

== Subdivisions ==
The municipal unit Apollonioi is subdivided into the following communities (constituent villages in brackets):

- Agios Ilias
- Agios Petros (Agios Petros, Ponti Agiou Petrou)
- Athani (Athani, Agios Nikolaos Niras)
- Chortata
- Dragano (Dragano, Panochori)
- Evgiros (Evgiros, Syvota)
- Komili
- Kontaraina
- Marantochori
- Nikolis (Nikolis, Manasi)
- Syvros
- Vasiliki
- Vournikas

== Population ==
Year	Population
1991	3,472
2001	3,235
2011	2,768
2021	2,389
