= Kefallinia (1965 ship) =

Greek ro-ro ferry

History

Greece
- Name: Kefallinia (1965–1993); Express Paros (1993–1999)
- Owner: Strintzis Lines, Greece (1965–1993); Katapoliani, Greece (1993–1999)
- Completed: 1965
- In service: 1965
- Out of service: 1999
- Fate: Sold, 1999

Tanzania
- Name: Zahara (1999–2001)
- Owner: Victoria Marine Passenger Transport Ltd., Tanzania (1999–2001)
- Acquired: 1999
- In service: 1999
- Out of service: 2001
- Identification: IMO number: 6520791
- Fate: Abandoned, 2001

General characteristics
- Type: Ro-Ro ferry
- Tonnage: 2,375 GRT; 794 DWT
- Length: 82 m (269 ft 0 in)
- Beam: 11.15 m (36 ft 7 in)
- Depth: 3.04 m (10 ft 0 in)
- Propulsion: 2 × 8-cylinder Werkspoor diesel engines, 2,942 kW (3,945 hp)
- Speed: 15 knots (28 km/h; 17 mph)
- Capacity: 600 passengers; 70 vehicles

MV Kefallinia (Greek: Κεφαλληνία) was a Greek ro-ro ferry. It was the first passenger ferry for Strintzis Lines (Now Blue Star Ferries). It was built in 1965 at the Th. Zervas & Sons shipyard in Perama, Greece. It could hold up a total of 600 passengers and 70 vehicles. It had two 8-cylinder, Werkspoor diesel engines with combined power of 2942 kW and could reach speeds up to 15 knots.

== History ==
The ship operated for Strintzis Lines mainly between the city of Patras and the Ionian island of Cephalonia. She also operated on other Greek islands. In 1993 she was sold to the Katapoliani company, and renamed Express Paros (Greek: Εξπρές Πάρος) remaining in service in Greek waters, sailing between Syros, Paros, Naxos, Ios and Santorini, and occasionally other smaller islands.

In 1999, when she reached the permitted age limit, the ship was sold to the Tanzanian company Victoria Marine Passenger Transport Ltd., renamed Zahara, and served between Dar es Salaam and Mtwara. After a breakdown at sea in 2001 the ship was barred from sailing in Tanzanian coastal waters, and was abandoned in Dar es Salaam. The Tanzanian Ports Authority announced in 2005 that it would scrap the derelict vessel unless the owners removed it. She was finally scrapped in November 2005.

== Route ==
The ship was used on the following routes:

MS Kefallinia's history of routes
Owner	Name	Date	Route
Strintzis Lines	Kefallinia	1965–1977	Patras-Sami
Strintzis Lines	Kefallinia	1965–1977	Patra-Sami-Vathi
Strintzis Lines	Kefallinia	1965–1977	Patra-Sami-Vathi-Frikes-Vassiliki-Nydri-Meganisi-Mytikas-Kalamos-Astakos
Strintzis Lines	Kefallinia	1965–1977	Patra-Sami-Fiskardo-Paxi-Corfu
Strintzis Lines	Kefallinia	1977–1984	Patra- Sami
Strintzis Lines	Kefallinia	1977–1984	Patra- Sami-Vathi
Strintzis Lines	Kefallinia	1977–1984	Patra-Sam-Paxi-Corfu
Strintzis Lines	Kefallinia	1984–1992	Patra- Sami-Vathi Kyllini-Poros
Strintzis Lines	Kefallinia	1992–1993	Igoumenitsa-Corfu-Otranto
Katapoliani	Paros Express	1993–1999	Syros-Paros-Naxos-Ios-Santorini (And other islands)
Victoria Passenger Marine Transport	Zahara	1999–2001	Dar el Salaam - Mtwara
