= Marantochori =

Marantochori Μαραντοχώρι
- Community
- Location within Greece
- Coordinates: 38°37′44″N 20°39′04″E
- Country: Greece
- Administrative region: Ionian Islands
- Regional unit: Lefkada
- Municipality: Lefkada
- Municipal unit: Apollonioi

Population (2021)
  - Community: 330
- Time zone: UTC+2 (EET)
  - Summer (DST): UTC+3 (EEST)

Marantochori is a small, quiet village in the southern part of the island of Lefkada, Greece. Almost all of the village is made up of farmers. It is one of the few places in Lefkada that does not have a view of the sea from any point.

The village spreads on a hill between Sivota, Evgiros and Kontarena. The main Lefkada road goes through the lower part of Marantochori, while the upper and older part is reached by a small road that ends up in Evgiros and Afteli Beach The village is usually very slow in the Spring, Fall, and Winter but come summer many residents return to their vacation homes in the village. The usual village activities at night are to go to the taverna and the bar which are both located right in the town center of the village. Also, many resident go to local cities Nydri, and Vassiliki for the nightlife there. During the day most visitors go to Amouso or other beaches near Marantochori to sunbathe.

Surnames of the area:

- Skliros
- Politis
- Kavadias
- Boursinos
- Zampelis
- Soldatos
- Gavril
