= Agios Petros =

Agios Petros (Greek for Saint Peter) may refer to the following places in Greece:

- Agios Petros, Arcadia, a village in the municipality of North Kynouria, Arcadia
- Agios Petros, Kilkis, a village in the municipal unit of Evropos, Kilkis regional unit
- Agios Petros, Lefkada, a village in the municipal unit of Apollonioi, Lefkada
