= Agios Ilias, Lefkada =

Agios Ilias Άγιος Ηλίας
- Community
- Location within Greece
- Coordinates: 38°41′N 20°39′E
- Country: Greece
- Administrative region: Ionian Islands
- Regional unit: Lefkada
- Municipality: Lefkada
- Municipal unit: Apollonioi

Population (2021)
  - Community: 78
- Time zone: UTC+2 (EET)
  - Summer (DST): UTC+3 (EEST)

Agios Ilias (Greek: Άγιος Ηλίας meaning Saint Elias) is a village on the island of Lefkada, Greece that is part of the municipal unit of Apollonioi.

== Population ==
Year	Population
1981	236
1991	186
2001	158
2011	125
2021	78

== See also ==
- List of settlements in the Lefkada regional unit
