= Jargalant, Arkhangai =

District in Arkhangai Province, Mongolia

Coordinates: 48°43′41″N 100°45′56″E

Jargalant District Жаргалант сум ᠵᠢᠷᠭᠠᠯᠠᠩᠲᠤᠰᠤᠮᠤ
- District
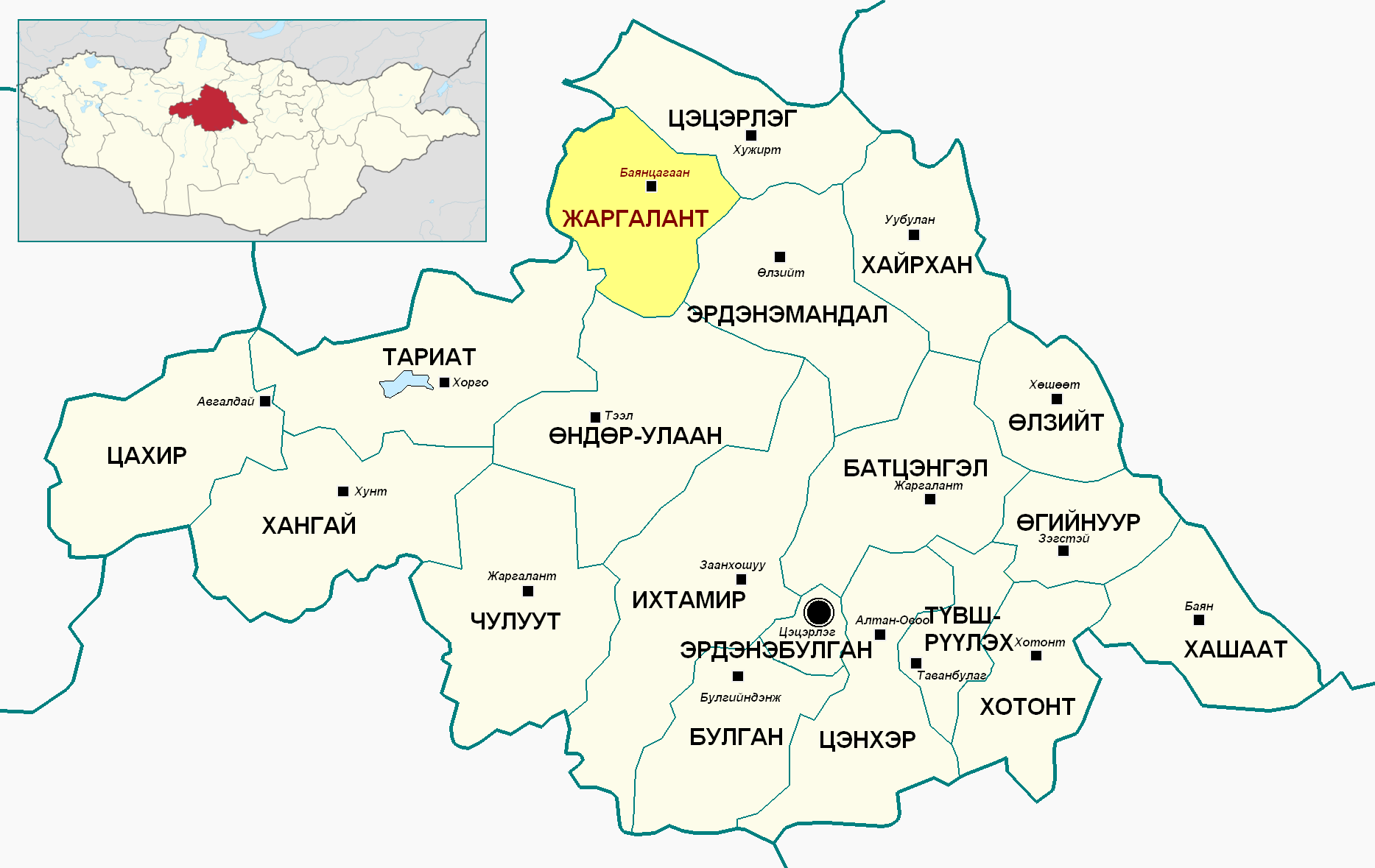
- Jargalant District in Arkhangai Province
- Country: Mongolia
- Province: Arkhangai Province

Area
  - Total: 3,832 km^{2} (1,480 sq mi)
- Time zone: UTC+8 (UTC + 8)
- Website: http://jargalant.ar.gov.mn/

Jargalant (Mongolian: Жаргалант, [ˈt͡ɕarɢɮən̥tʰ]; "Happiness") is a sum (district) of Arkhangai Province in central Mongolia. In 2009, its population was 4,111.

== Geology ==
Around 62.02% of the district's territory is covered by forest.

== Administrative divisions ==
The district is divided into five bags, which are:

- Asait
- Bayantsagaan
- Erdene-Uul
- Khoolt
- Zuslan
