= Naranbulag, Uvs =

District in Uvs Province, Mongolia

Coordinates: 49°22′50″N 92°34′42″E

Naranbulag District Наранбулаг сум ᠨᠠᠷᠠᠨᠪᠤᠯᠠᠭᠰᠤᠮᠤ
- District
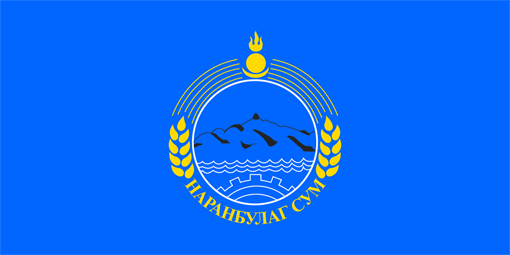
- Flag
- Interactive map of Naranbulag District
- Country: Mongolia
- Province: Uvs Province
- Time zone: UTC+7 (UTC + 7)

Naranbulag (Mongolian: Наранбулаг) is a sum (district) of Uvs Province in western Mongolia.

== Administrative divisions ==
The district is divided into four bags, which are:

- Aldar
- Gun Burd
- Khujirt
- Ulaan-Uzuur
