= Darvi, Govi-Altai =

District in Govi-Altai Province, Mongolia

Coordinates: 46°27′48″N 94°06′11″E

Darvi District Дарви сум ᠳᠠᠷᠪᠢᠰᠤᠮᠤ
- District
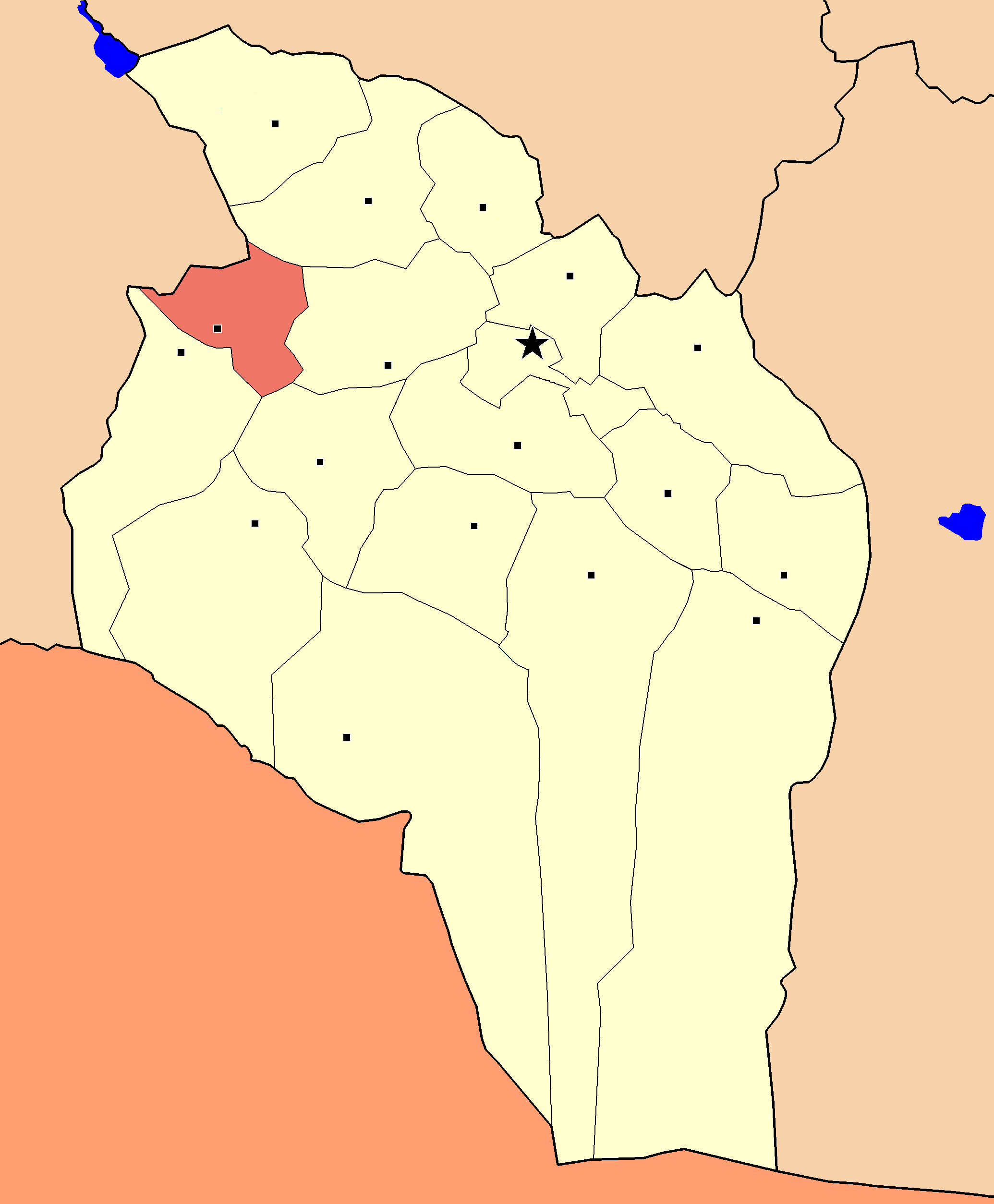
- Darvi District in Govi-Altai Province
- Country: Mongolia
- Province: Govi-Altai Province

Area
  - Total: 3,523 km^{2} (1,360 sq mi)
- Time zone: UTC+8 (UTC + 8)

Darvi (Mongolian: Дарви) (also Dariv) is a sum (district) of Govi-Altai Province in western Mongolia. In 2009, its population was 1,819.

== Administrative divisions ==
The district is divided into four bags, which are:

- Ikhes
- Javkhlant
- Khujirt
- Uildver
