= Evgiros =

Evgiros Εύγηρος
- Community
- Location within Greece
- Coordinates: 38°38′01″N 20°36′34″E
- Country: Greece
- Administrative region: Ionian Islands
- Regional unit: Lefkada
- Municipality: Lefkada
- Municipal unit: Apollonioi

Population (2021)
  - Community: 121
- Time zone: UTC+2 (EET)
  - Summer (DST): UTC+3 (EEST)

Evgiros is a village on the island of Lefkada, in the Ionian Islands of Greece. It is part of the municipal unit of Apollonioi.

== Location, elevation ==
Evgiros is situated on a hill in the south of Lefkada, at an elevation of 820 feet (250 meters). It overlooks the Afales Bay in Ithaca and the northern part of Cephalonia.

== History ==
Evgiros used to be one of the main villages on the island, with a population of more than 900 as late as 1950. The village was the center of its own municipality, with Heracles' head as its symbol. The local school had more than 80 pupils. The economy was based on olive and grapes crops, with the village operating 8 oil mills. Goats and sheep were bred for cheese, a staple of the local diet. Two large areas were available for the crops and the herds, the "Campo" below the village, and the "Vounì" (dialect: small mountain) above it.

In the second half of the 20th century, challenging economic conditions brought along the Greek diaspora: many of the locals left for Athens, and more emigrated to Australia, Canada, Germany or the United States.

=== World War II ===
Evgiros was occupied by the Italians in 1941, and later, after the Armistice of Cassibile, by the Germans. Some of the former invading Italians were aided and hidden by villagers to protect them from the Germans, as Lefkas had its own small version of the Cephalonia Massacre. Evgiros villagers were involved in the Resistance, with the Germans burning many houses as a reprisal.

== Population ==
Current population in Evgiros is around 30 people year round. In the summer and the Holidays many of the people who left come back, and the village goes back in time, hosting some 200 people.

== Attractions in Evgiros ==
- Church of the Panagia and cemetery, sitting above the village is the oldest church.
- Agios Vasilis Church, sitting on the main square, is the main church, with a hoop for basketball, a yard for the kids to play, a bar and a restaurant.
- The village's annual festival "Panaigiri tis Panagias" takes place on 14–15 August and is dedicated to the Dormition of the Panagia (Dormition of the Holy Mary)

== Families ==
There are only three family names in Evgiros, mainly of Italian or Venetian origin:

- Fatouros
- Dellaportas
- Soldatos
