= Shine-Ider, Khövsgöl =

District in Khövsgöl Province, Mongolia

Coordinates: 48°56′53″N 99°32′04″E

Shine-Ider District Шинэ-Идэр сум ᠰᠢᠨ᠎ᠡᠢᠳᠡᠷᠰᠤᠮᠤ
- District
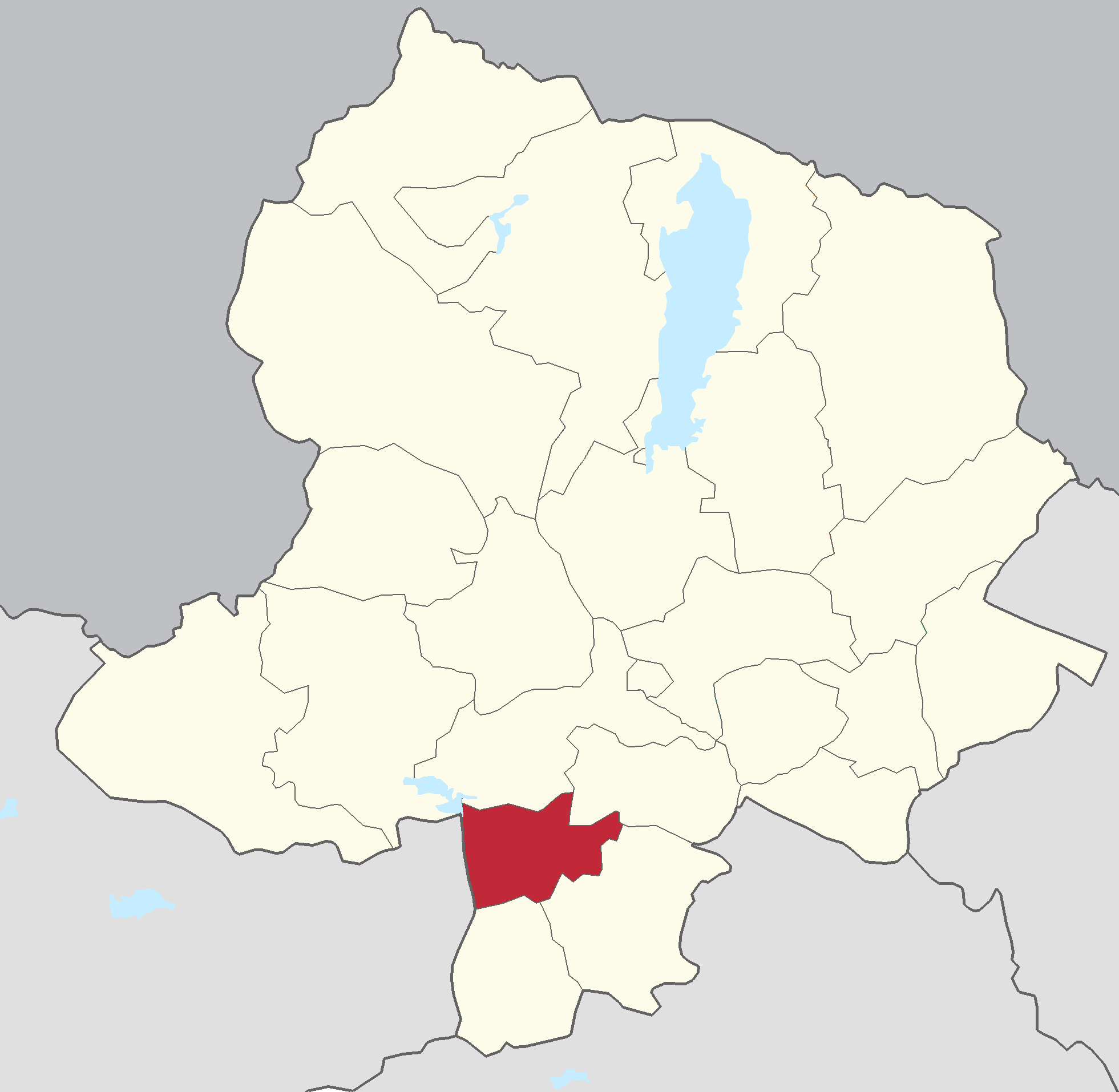
- Shine-Ider District in Khövsgöl Province
- Country: Mongolia
- Province: Khövsgöl Province
- Time zone: UTC+8 (UTC + 8)

Shine-Ider (Mongolian: Шинэ-Идэр; "new Ider") is a sum of Khövsgöl aimag. The area is about 2,050 km^{2}, of which 1,700 km^{2} are pasture. In 2000, the sum had 4348 inhabitants, mainly Khalkha. The sum center, officially named Erdenet (Mongolian: Эрдэнэт), is located 123 km south-southeast of Mörön and 839 kilometers from Ulaanbaatar.

== History ==
The Shine-Ider sum was founded in 1923 as Chandmana sum of the Tsetserleg Mandal Uulyn aimag's Chandmana-Ölziit Dalain khoshuu. In 1931, it became the Chandmana sum of the newly founded Arkhangai aimag. In 1942 it became part of Khövsgöl aimag, and was renamed Shine-Ider in 1956. The local Jargalyn Zam (Road of Happiness) negdel was founded in 1954.

== Administrative divisions ==
The district is divided into four bags, which are:

- Bayannuur
- Bayanzurkh
- Nukht
- Sangiin dalai

== Economy ==
In 2004, there were roughly 111,000 heads of livestock, among them 62,000 sheep, 35,000 goats, 7,200 cattle and yaks, 5,700 horses, and 56 camels.

== Interesting Places ==
There are some rock paintings in the area.

== Literature ==
M.Nyamaa, Khövsgöl aimgiin lavlakh toli, Ulaanbaatar 2001, p. 212f
