= Porto Katsiki =

Beach on the Ionian island of Lefkada, Greece

Coordinates: 38°36′09″N 20°32′58″E

Porto Katsiki (Greek: Πόρτο Κατσίκι, "goat port") is a beach on the Ionian island of Lefkada, Greece. The name is said to be because formerly only goats could reach this area.

The beach is famed for its landscape and clear blue sea. It is located at the bottom of a concave pale cliff. It is 35 km from Lefkada town, near Athani village. Porto Katsiki has parking lots and canteens. There is no lodging, and camping is prohibited. There is a stairway down to the beach from the cliff-top parking. In the day, boats bring tourists to the beach, particularly from nearby Nidri.

== 2015 earthquake ==
When Lefkada was hit by an earthquake in 2015, the beach was badly damaged. Geologists estimated that the beach will be restored naturally over time.
