= Agios Petros, Lefkada =

Agios Petros Άγιος Πέτρος
- Community
- Location within Greece
- Coordinates: 38°40′N 20°36′E
- Country: Greece
- Administrative region: Ionian Islands
- Regional unit: Lefkada
- Municipality: Lefkada
- Municipal unit: Apollonioi

Population (2021)
  - Community: 461
- Time zone: UTC+2 (EET)
  - Summer (DST): UTC+3 (EEST)

Agios Petros (meaning Saint Peter) (Greek: Άγιος Πέτρος) is a village and a community in the municipal unit of Apollonioi in the southern part of the Lefkada Island in Greece. The community consists of the villages Agios Petros and Ponti Agiou Petrou. Agios Petros is situated on a mountain slope 4 km (2.5 mi) north of Vasiliki, 4 km (2.5 mi) west of Syvros, and 21 km (13 mi) southwest of Lefkada.

There are many beaches nearby, with clear blue waters. The village houses are old, but well maintained, with landscaped gardens, which compose an impressive setting that fascinates visitors. The main occupations of the residents are tourism, fishing, livestock and olive trees cultivation.

== Population ==
Year	Village population	Community population
1981	725	-
1991	647	-
2001	578	617
2011	422	548
2021	397	461

== Photos ==
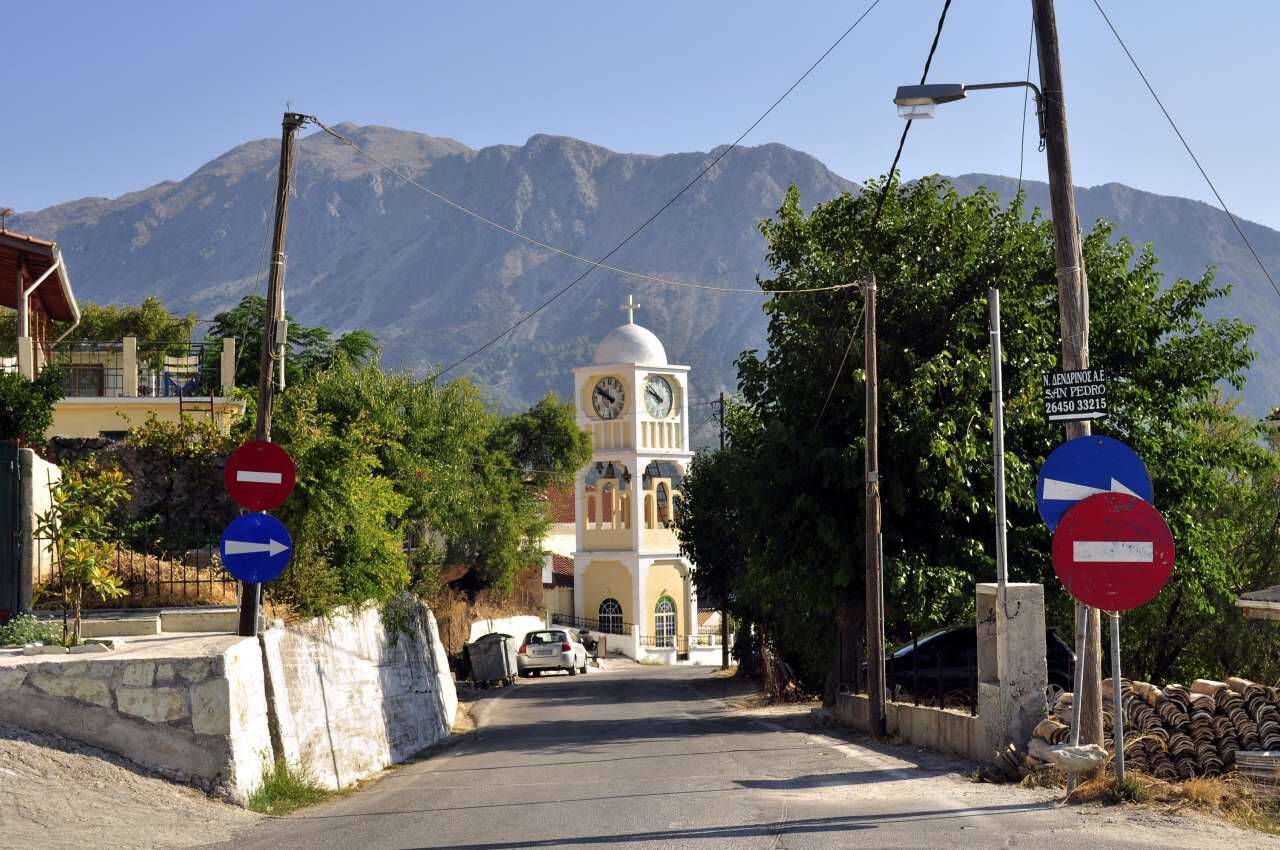
Central road axis

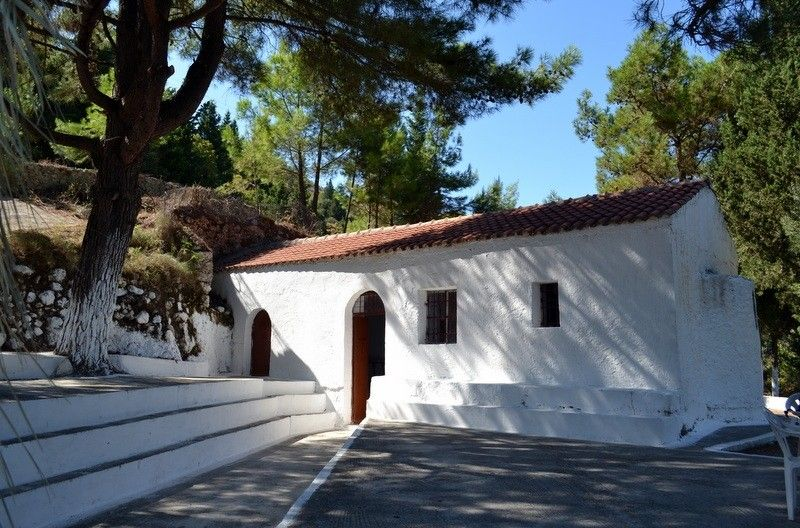
Chapel of Agia Eleousa

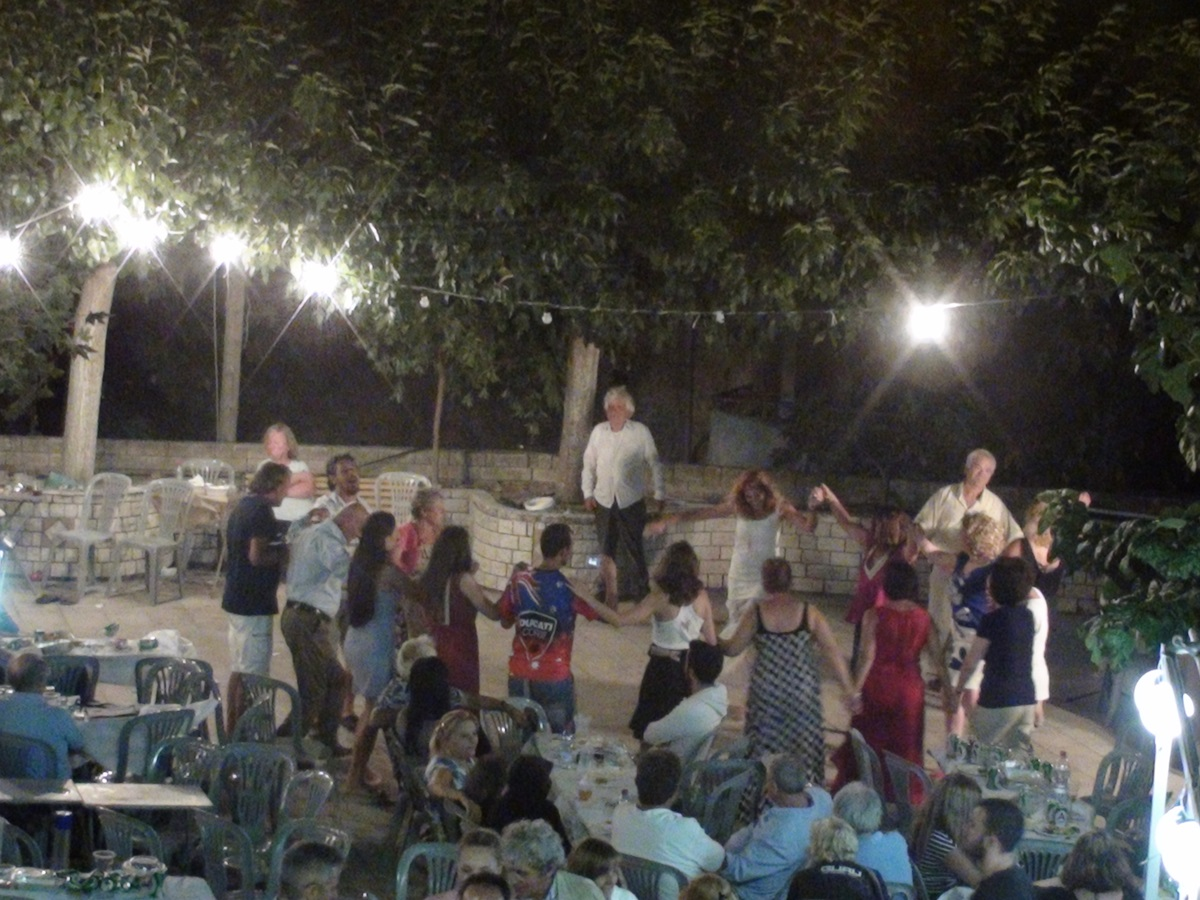
Main square of the village

== See also ==
- List of settlements in the Lefkada regional unit
