= Vasiliki, Lefkada =

Vasiliki Βασιλική
- Community
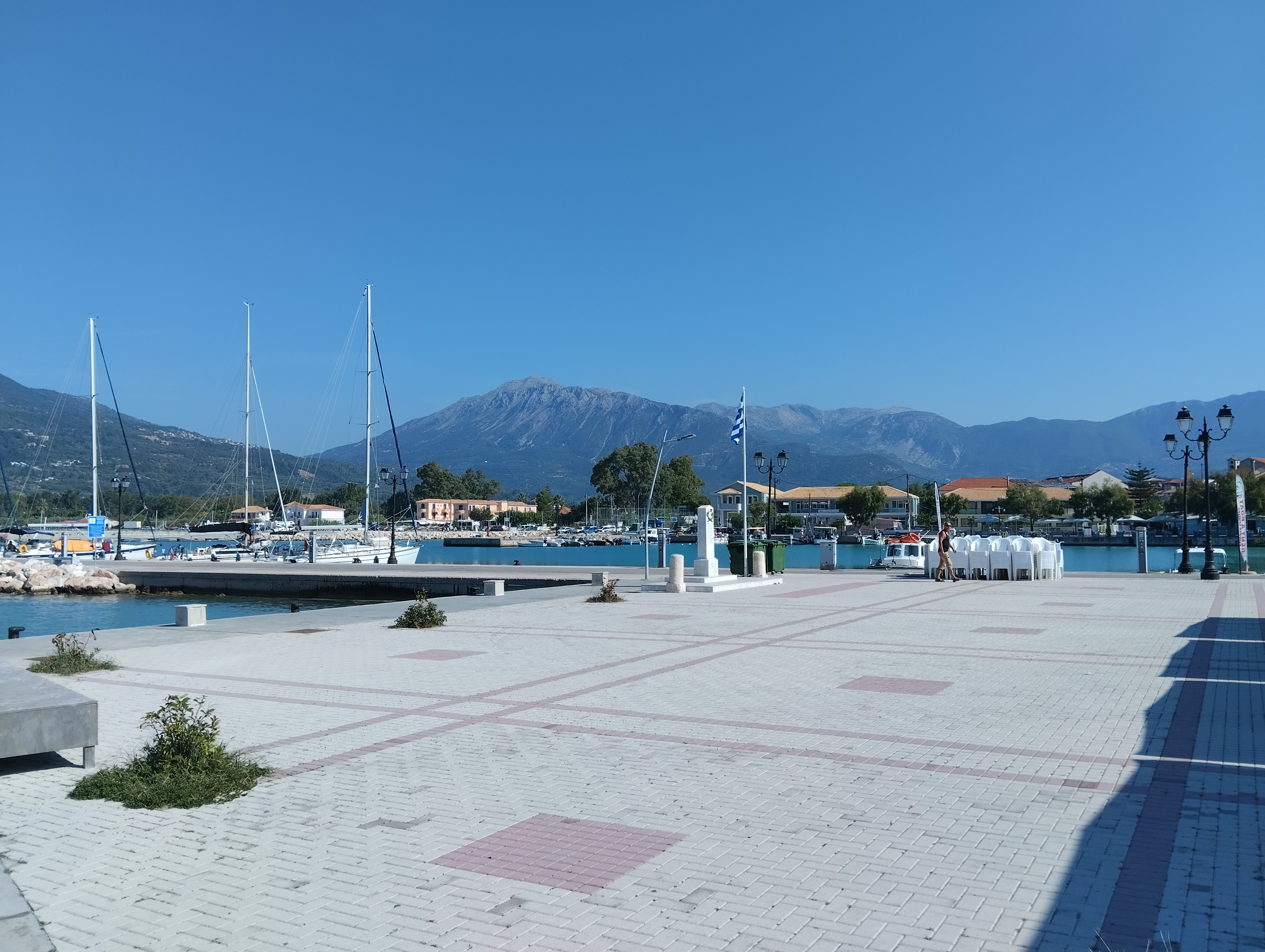
- The port in Vasiliki

- Location within Greece
- Coordinates: 38°38′N 20°37′E
- Country: Greece
- Administrative region: Ionian Islands
- Regional unit: Lefkada
- Municipality: Lefkada
- Municipal unit: Apollonioi
- Lowest elevation: 0 m (0 ft)

Population (2021)
  - Community: 407
- Time zone: UTC+2 (EET)
  - Summer (DST): UTC+3 (EEST)

Vasiliki (Greek: Βασιλική, Vasilikí; formerly Voivoida (Βοϊβόδα, Voïvóda) is a town in the municipal unit of Apollonioi, on the island of Lefkada, Greece. It is situated on the south coast, 4 km south of Agios Petros and 25 km southwest of Lefkada (city).

Vasiliki is a well known windsurfing spot during the summer months due to a local thermal wind known amongst windsurfers as 'Eric' that rises in the afternoon as the land nearby gets warmed up. There are often over a hundred windsurfers in the bay at any one time. The area is also popular with other sailing craft and mountain bikers. Several holiday companies operate in Vasiliki, providing windsurfing and sailing equipment for their guests to use.

== Population ==
Year	Population
1981	371
1991	368
2001	431
2011	395
2021	407

== See also ==
- List of settlements in the Lefkada regional unit
