= History of the Cyclades =

Greek islands located in the Aegean Sea

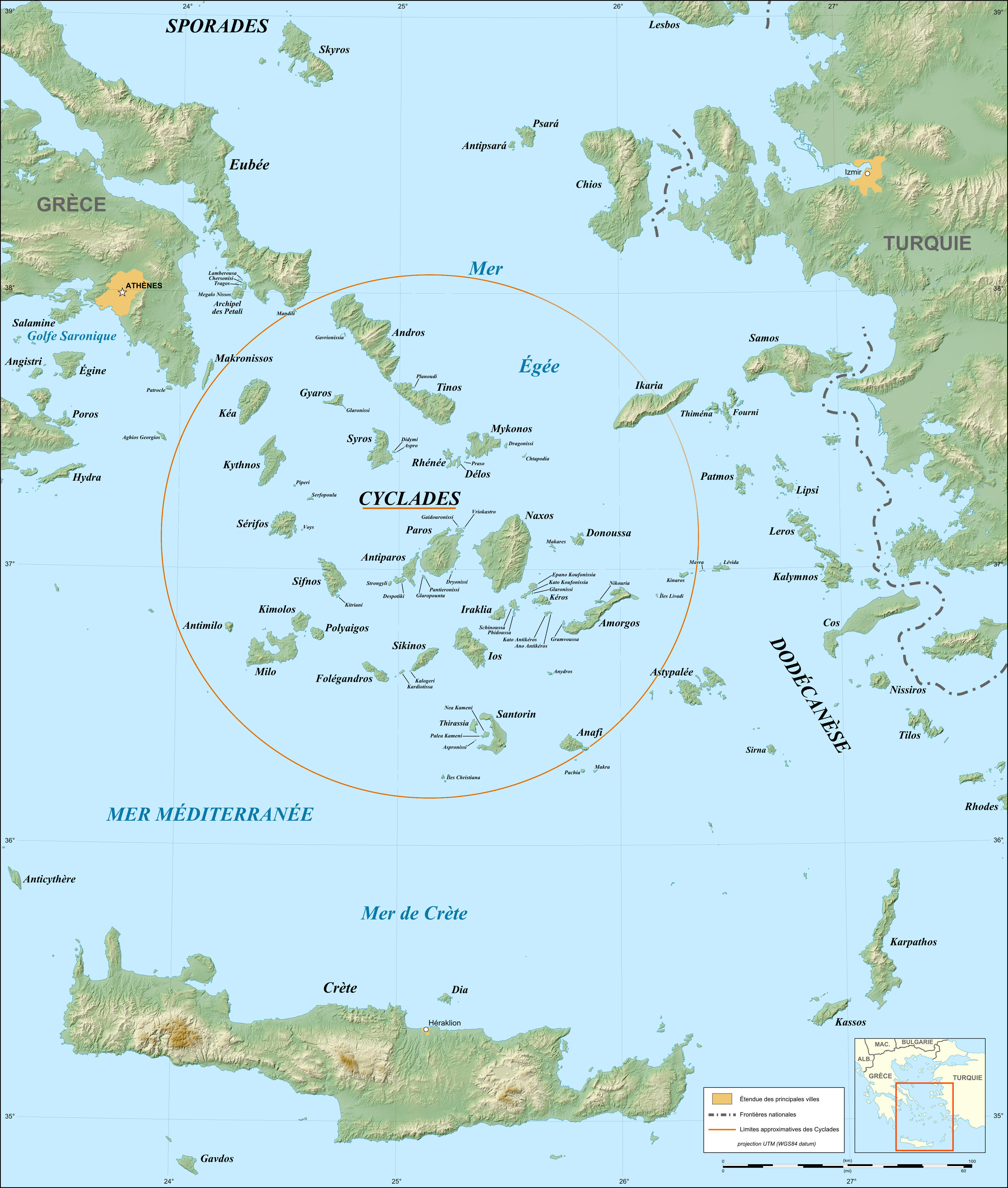
Map of the Cyclades

The Cyclades (Greek: Κυκλάδες Kykládes) are Greek islands located in the southern part of the Aegean Sea. The archipelago contains some 2,200 islands, islets and rocks; just 33 islands are inhabited. For the ancients, they formed a circle (κύκλος / kyklos in Greek) around the sacred island of Delos, hence the name of the archipelago. The best-known are, from north to south and from east to west: Andros, Tinos, Mykonos, Naxos, Amorgos, Syros, Paros and Antiparos, Ios, Santorini, Anafi, Kea, Kythnos, Serifos, Sifnos, Folegandros and Sikinos, Milos and Kimolos; to these can be added the little Cyclades: Irakleia, Schoinoussa, Koufonisi, Keros and Donoussa, as well as Makronisos between Kea and Attica, Gyaros, which lies before Andros, and Polyaigos to the east of Kimolos and Thirassia, before Santorini. At times they were also called by the generic name of the Archipelago.

The islands are located at the crossroads of Europe, Asia Minor, and the Near East as well as between Europe and Africa. In antiquity, when navigation consisted only of cabotage and sailors sought never to lose sight of land, they played an essential role as a stopover. Into the 20th century, this situation made their fortune (trade was one of their chief activities) and their misfortune (control of the Cyclades allowed for control of the commercial and strategic routes in the Aegean).

Numerous authors considered, or still consider, them as a unit. The insular group is indeed rather homogeneous from a geomorphological point of view; moreover, the islands are visible from one anothers' shores while being distinctly separate from the continents that surround them. They have in common a dry climate and soil. Although these physical facts are undeniable, other components of this unity are more subjective. Thus, one can read certain authors who say that the islands’ population is, of all the regions of Greece, the only original one, and has not been subjected to external admixtures. However, the Cyclades have very often known different destinies.

Their natural resources and their potential role as trade-route stopovers has allowed them to be peopled since the Neolithic. Thanks to these assets, they experienced a brilliant cultural flowering in the 3rd millennium BC: the Cycladic civilisation. The proto-historical powers, the Minoans and then the Mycenaeans, made their influence known there. The Cyclades had a new zenith in the Archaic period (8th – 6th century BC). The Persians tried to take them during their attempts to conquer Greece. Then they entered into Athens's orbit with the Delian Leagues. The Hellenistic kingdoms disputed their status while Delos became a great commercial power.

Commercial activities were pursued during the Roman and Byzantine Empires, yet they were sufficiently prosperous to attract pirates' attention. The participants of the Fourth Crusade divided the Byzantine Empire among themselves, and the Cyclades entered the Venetian orbit. Western feudal lords created a certain number of fiefs, of which the Duchy of Naxos was the most important. The Duchy was conquered by the Ottoman Empire, which allowed the islands a certain administrative and fiscal autonomy. Economic prosperity continued despite the pirates. The archipelago had an ambiguous attitude towards the war of independence. Having become Greek in the 1830s, the Cyclades have shared the history of Greece since that time. At first they went through a period of commercial prosperity, still due to their geographic position, before the trade routes and modes of transport changed. After suffering a rural exodus, the islands began a renewal with the influx of tourists. However, tourism is not the Cyclades' only resource today.

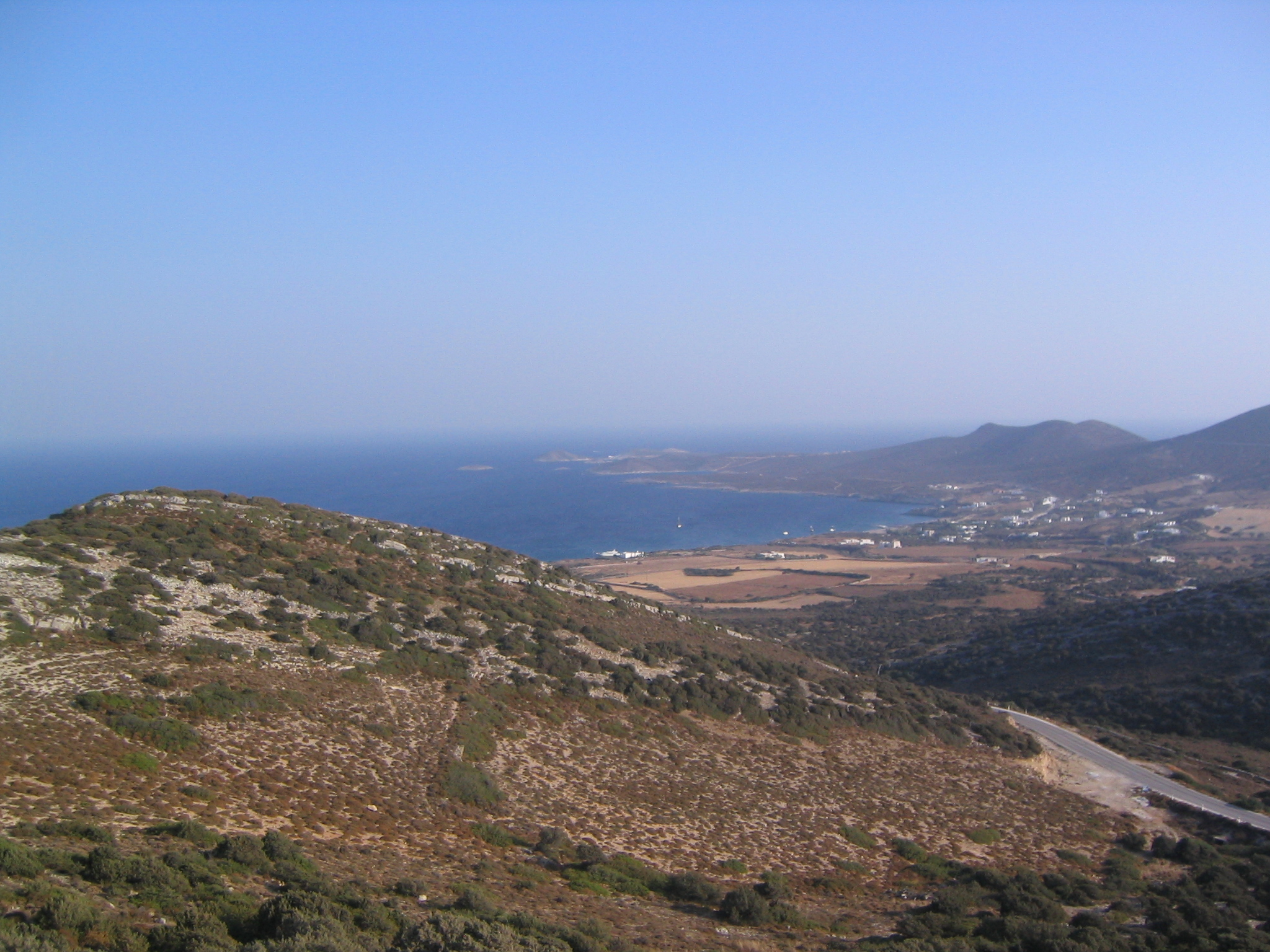
Antiparos

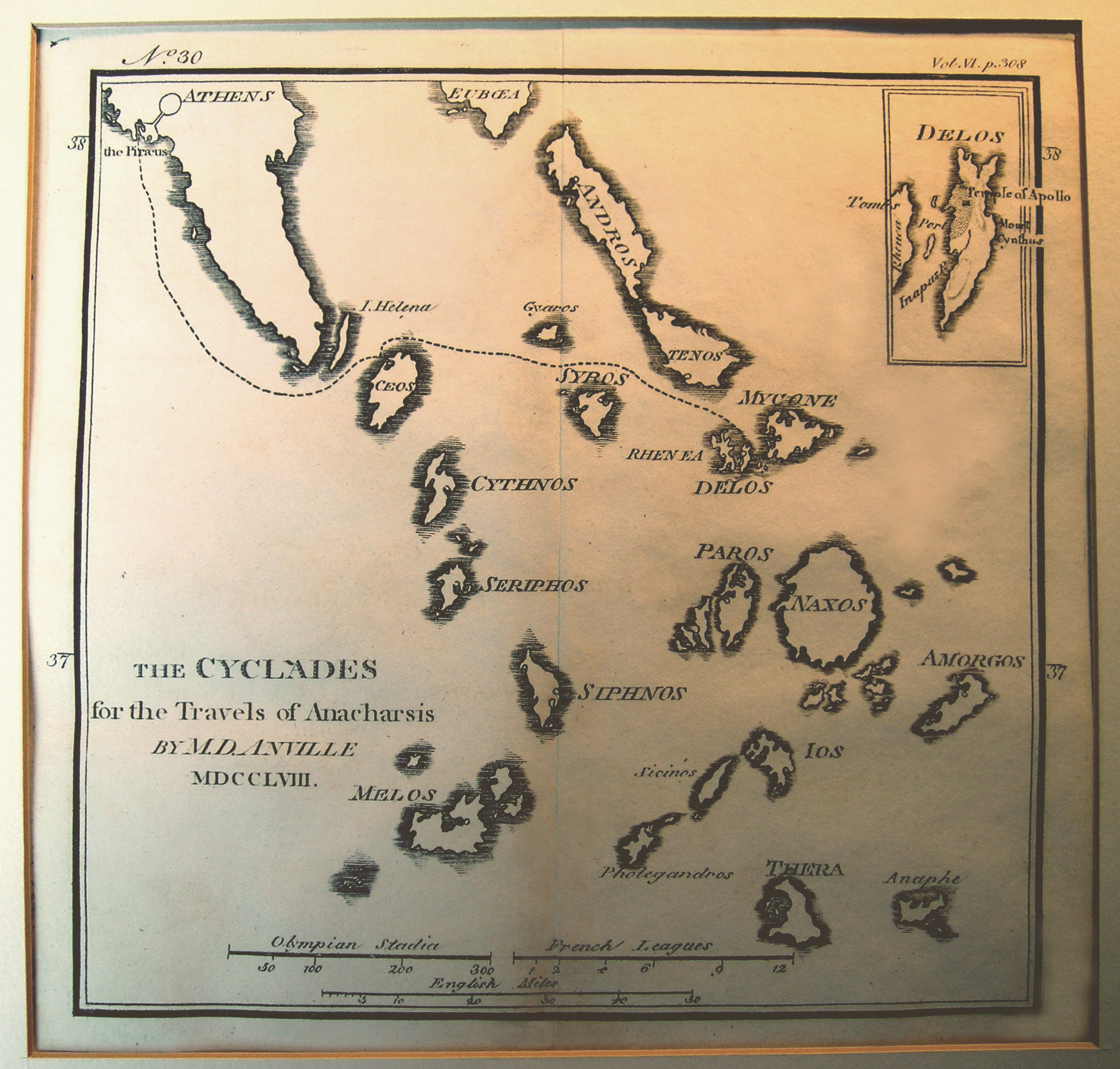
Historic map of the Cyclades for the Travels of Anacharsis the Younger

== Prehistory ==
=== Neolithic era ===
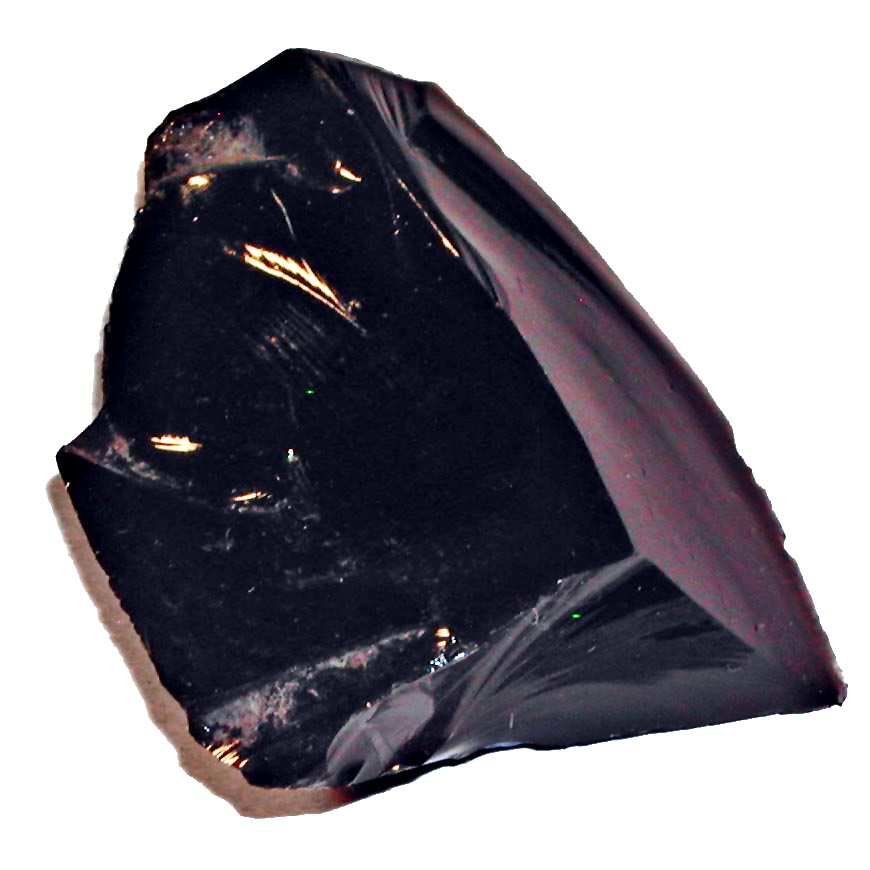
A block of obsidian.

The most ancient traces of activity (but not necessarily habitation) in the Cyclades were not discovered on the islands themselves, but on the continent, at Argolis, in Franchthi Cave. Research there uncovered, in a layer dating to the 11th millennium BC, obsidian originating from Milos. The volcanic island was thus exploited and inhabited, not necessarily in permanent fashion, and its inhabitants were capable of navigating and trading across a distance of at least 150 km.

A permanent settlement on the islands could only be established by a sedentary population that had at its disposal methods of agriculture and animal husbandry that could exploit the few fertile plains. Hunter-gatherers would have had much greater difficulties. At the Maroula site on Kythnos a bone fragment has been uncovered and dated, using Carbon-14, to 7,500-6,500 BC. The oldest inhabited places are the islet of Saliagos between Paros and Antiparos, Kephala, Kea, and perhaps the oldest strata are those at Grotta on Naxos. They date back to the 5th millennium BC.

On Saliagos (at that time connected to its two neighbours, Paros and Antiparos), houses of stone without mortar have been found, as well as Cycladic statuettes. Estimates based on excavations in the cemetery of Kephala put the number of inhabitants at between forty-five and eighty. Studies of skulls have revealed bone deformations, especially in the vertebrae. They have been attributed to arthritic conditions, which afflict sedentary societies. Osteoporosis, another sign of a sedentary lifestyle, is present, but more rarely than on the continent in the same period. Life expectancy has been estimated at twenty years, with maximum ages reaching twenty-eight to thirty. Women lived shorter lives than men.

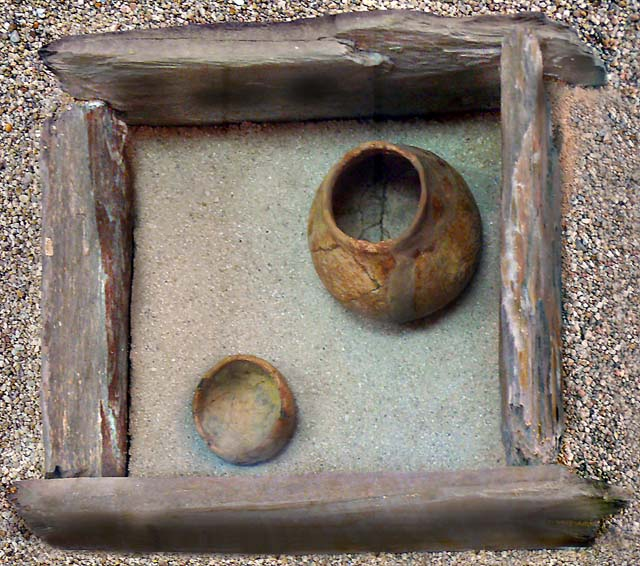
Reconstruction of a cist tomb.

A sexual division of labour seems to have existed. Women took care of children, harvesting, light agricultural duties, small livestock, spinning (spindle whorls have been found in women's tombs), basketry, and pottery. Men busied themselves with conventionally masculine chores: heavy agricultural work, hunting, fishing, and work involving stone, bone, wood, and metal. This sexual division of labour led to a first social differentiation: the richest cist tombs belong to men. Pottery was made without a lathe, judging by the hand-modelled clay balls; pictures were applied to the pottery with brushes, while incisions were made with the fingernails. The vases were then baked in a pit or a grinding wheel—Neolithic Cycladiotes used no kilns, and only low firing temperatures of 700˚-800˚C were reached. Small-sized metal objects have been found on Naxos. The operation of silver mines on Siphnos may also date to this period.

=== Cycladic civilisation ===
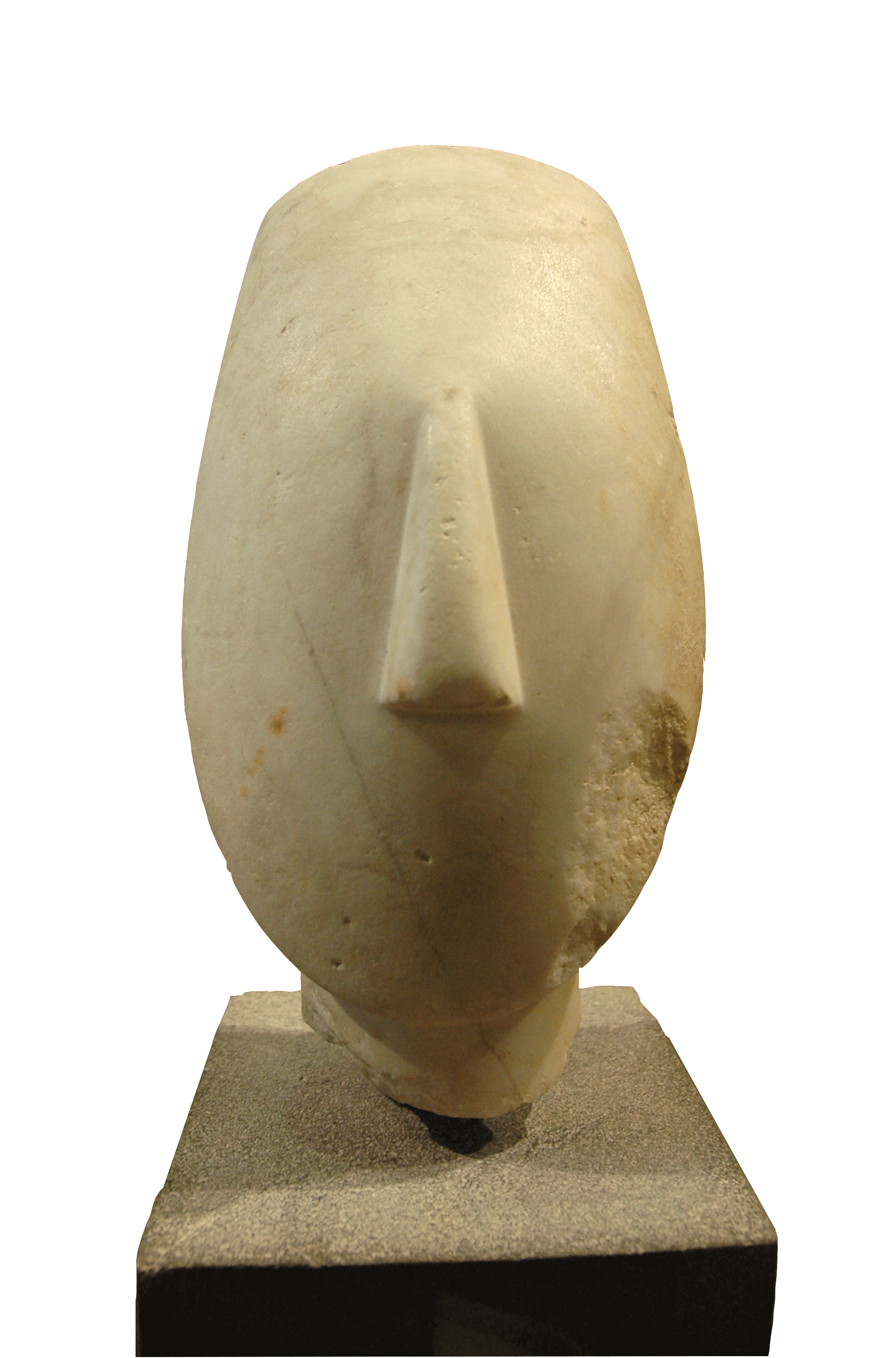
Head of a female figure, Keros-Syros culture, Early Cycladic II (2700–2300 BC), Louvre.

At the end of the 19th century, following the earlier work of antiquaries such as Theodore Bent on Antiparos in 1884, the Greek archaeologist Christos Tsountas, having assembled various discoveries from numerous islands, suggested that the Cyclades were part of a cultural unit during the 3rd millennium BC: the Cycladic civilisation, dating back to the Bronze Age. It is famous for its marble idols, found as far as Portugal and the mouth of the Danube, which proves its dynamism.

It is slightly older than the Minoan civilisation of Crete. The beginnings of the Minoan civilisation were influenced by the Cycladic civilisation: Cycladic statuettes were imported into Crete and local artisans imitated Cycladic techniques; archaeological evidence supporting this notion has been found at Aghia Photia, Knossos and Archanes. At the same time, excavations in the cemetery of Aghios Kosmas in Attica have uncovered objects proving a strong Cycladic influence, due either to a high percentage of the population being Cycladic or to an actual colony originating in the islands.

Three great periods have traditionally been designated (equivalent to those that divide the Helladic on the continent and the Minoan in Crete):

- Early Cycladic I (EC I; 3200-2800 BC), also called the Grotta-Pelos culture
- Early Cycladic II (EC II; 2800-2300 BC), also called the Keros-Syros culture and often considered the apogee of Cycladic civilisation
- Early Cycladic III (EC III; 2300-2000 BC), also called the Phylakopi culture

The study of skeletons found in tombs, always in cists, shows an evolution from the Neolithic. Osteoporosis was less prevalent although arthritic diseases continued to be present. Thus, diet had improved. Life expectancy progressed: men lived up to forty or forty-five years, but women only thirty. The sexual division of labour remained the same as that identified for the Early Neolithic: women busied themselves with small domestic and agricultural tasks, while men took care of larger duties and crafts. Agriculture, as elsewhere in the Mediterranean basin, was based on grain (mainly barley, which needs less water than wheat), grapevines and olive trees. Animal husbandry was already primarily concerned with goats and sheep, as well as a few hogs, but very few bovines, the raising of which is still poorly developed on the islands. Fishing completed the diet base, due for example to the regular migration of tuna. At the time, wood was more abundant than today, allowing for the construction of house frames and boats.

The inhabitants of these islands, who lived mainly near the shore, were remarkable sailors and merchants, thanks to their islands’ geographic position. It seems that at the time, the Cyclades exported more merchandise than they imported, a rather unusual circumstance during their history. The ceramics found at various Cycladic sites (Phylakopi on Milos, Aghia Irini on Kea and Akrotiri on Santorini) prove the existence of commercial routes going from continental Greece to Crete while mainly passing by the Western Cyclades, up until the Late Cycladic. Excavations at these three sites have uncovered vases produced on the continent or on Crete and imported onto the islands.

It is known that there were specialised artisans: founders, blacksmiths, potters and sculptors, but it is impossible to say if they made a living off their work. Obsidian from Milos remained the dominant material for the production of tools, even after the development of metallurgy, for it was less expensive. Tools have been found that were made of a primitive bronze, an alloy of copper and arsenic. The copper came from Kythnos and already contained a high volume of arsenic. Tin, the provenance of which has not been determined, was only later introduced into the islands, after the end of the Cycladic civilisation. The oldest bronze containing tin was found at Kastri on Tinos (dating to the time of the Phylakopi Culture) and their composition proves they came from Troad, either as raw materials or as finished products. Therefore, commercial exchanges between the Troad and the Cyclades existed.

These tools were used to work marble, above all coming from Naxos and Paros, either for the celebrated Cycladic idols, or for marble vases. It appears that marble was not then, like today, extracted from mines, but was quarried in great quantities. The emery of Naxos also furnished material for polishing. Finally, the pumice stone of Santorini allowed for a perfect finish.

The pigments that can be found on statuettes, as well as in tombs, also originated on the islands, as well as the azurite for blue and the iron ore for red.

Eventually, the inhabitants left the seashore and moved toward the islands’ summits within fortified enclosures reinforced out by round towers at the corners. It was at this time that piracy might first have made an appearance in the archipelago.

=== Minoans and Mycenaeans ===
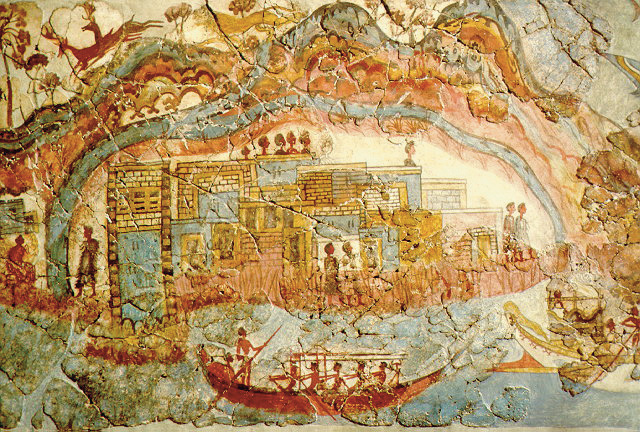
This procession of ships on a fresco from Akrotiri (prehistoric city) also shows a Cycladic settlement of the 2nd millennium BC.

The Cretans occupied the Cyclades during the 2nd millennium BC, then the Mycenaeans from 1450 BC and the Dorians from 1100 BC. The islands, due to their relatively small size, could not fight against these highly centralised powers.

==== Literary sources ====
Thucydides writes that Minos expelled the archipelago's first inhabitants, the Carians, whose tombs were numerous on Delos. Herodotus specifies that the Carians were subjects of king Minos and went by the name Leleges at that time. They were completely independent (“they paid no tribute”), but supplied sailors for Minos’ ships.

According to Herodotus, the Carians were the best warriors of their time and taught the Greeks to place plumes on their helmets, to represent insignia on their shields and to use straps to hold these.

Later, the Dorians would expel the Carians from the Cyclades; the former were followed by the Ionians, who turned the island of Delos into a great religious centre.

==== Cretan influence ====
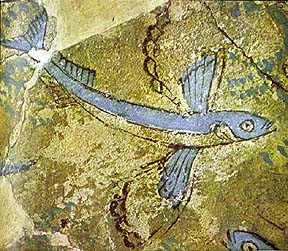
Minoan fresco at Phylakopi on Milos.

Fifteen settlements from the Middle Cycladic (c. 2000-1600 BC) are known. The three best studied are Aghia Irini (IV and V) on Kea, Paroikia on Paros and Phylakopi (II) on Milos. The absence of a real break (despite a stratum of ruins) between Phylakopi I and Phylakopi II suggests that the transition between the two was not a brutal one. The principal proof of an evolution from one stage to the next is the disappearance of Cycladic idols from the tombs, which by contrast changed very little, having remained in cists since the Neolithic.

The Cyclades also underwent a cultural differentiation. One group in the north around Kea and Syros tended to approach the Northeast Aegean from a cultural point of view, while the Southern Cyclades seem to have been closer to the Cretan civilisation. Ancient tradition speaks of a Minoan maritime empire, a sweeping image that demands some nuance, but it is nevertheless undeniable that Crete ended up having influence over the entire Aegean. This began to be felt more strongly beginning with the Late Cycladic, or the Late Minoan (from 1700/1600 BC), especially with regard to influence by Knossos and Cydonia. During the Late Minoan, important contacts are attested at Kea, Milos and Santorini; Minoan pottery and architectural elements (polythyra, skylights, frescoes) as well as signs of Linear A have been found. The shards found on the other Cyclades appear to have arrived there indirectly from these three islands. It is difficult to determine the nature of the Minoan presence on the Cyclades: settler colonies, protectorate or trading post. For a time it was proposed that the great buildings at Akrotiri on Santorini (the West House) or at Phylakopi might be the palaces of foreign governors, but no formal proof exists that could back up this hypothesis. Likewise, too few archaeological proofs exist of an exclusively Cretan district, as would be typical for a settler colony. It seems that Crete defended her interests in the region through agents who could play a more or less important political role. In this way the Minoan civilisation protected its commercial routes. This would also explain why the Cretan influence was stronger on the three islands of Kea, Milos and Santorini. The Cyclades were a very active trading zone. The western axis of these three was of paramount importance. Kea was the first stop off the continent, being closest, near the mines of Laurium; Milos redistributed to the rest of the archipelago and remained the principal source of obsidian; and Santorini played for Crete the same role Kea did for Attica.

The great majority of bronze continued to be made with arsenic; tin progressed very slowly in the Cyclades, beginning in the northeast of the archipelago.

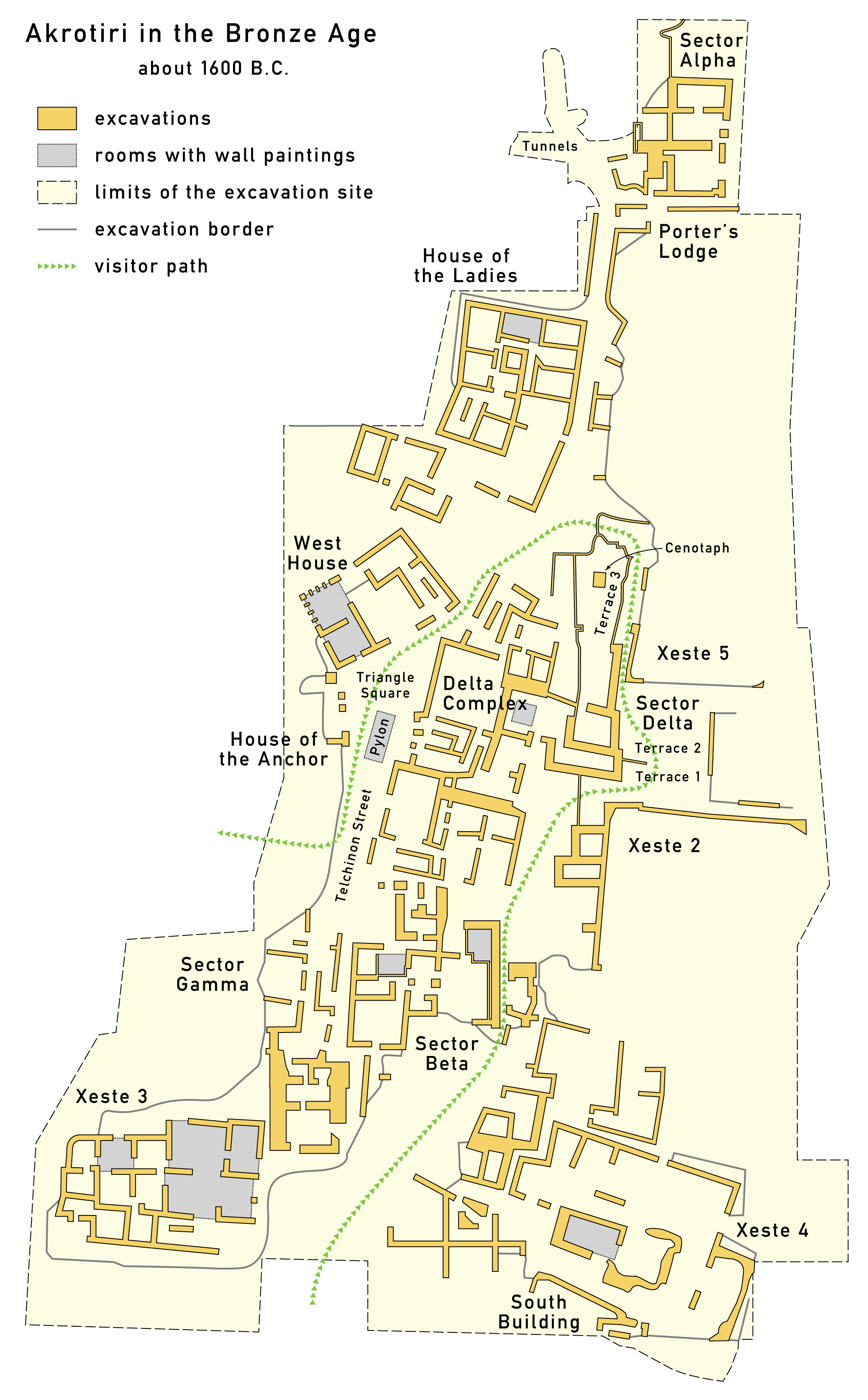
Map of Akrotiri.

Settlements were small villages of sailors and farmers, often tightly fortified. The houses, rectangular, of one to three rooms, were attached, of modest size and build, sometimes with an upper floor, more or less regularly organised into blocks separated by paved lanes. There were no palaces such as were found in Crete or on the mainland. “Royal tombs” have also not been found on the islands. Although they more or less kept their political and commercial independence, it seems that from a religious perspective, the Cretan influence was very strong. Objects of worship (zoomorphic rhyta, libation tables, etc.), religious aids such as polished baths, and themes found on frescoes are similar at Santorini or Phylakopi and in the Cretan palaces.

The explosion at Santorini (between the Late Minoan IA and the Late Minoan IB) buried and preserved an example of a habitat: Akrotiri.

Excavations since 1967 have uncovered a built-up area covering one hectare, not counting the defensive wall. The layout ran in a straight line, with a more or less orthogonal network of paved streets fitted with drains. The buildings had two to three floors and lacked skylights and courtyards; openings onto the street provided air and light. The ground floor contained the staircase and rooms serving as stores or workshops; the rooms on the next floor, slightly larger, had a central pillar and were decorated with frescoes. The houses had terraced roofs placed on beams that had not been squared, covered up with a vegetable layer (seaweed or leaves) and then several layers of clay soil, a practice that continues in traditional societies to this day.

From the beginning of excavations in 1967, the Greek archaeologist Spiridon Marinatos noted that the city had undergone a first destruction, due to an earthquake, before the eruption, as some of the buried objects were ruins, whereas a volcano alone may have left them intact. At almost the same time, the site of Aghia Irini on Kea was also destroyed by an earthquake. One thing is certain: after the eruption, Minoan imports stopped coming into Aghia Irini (VIII), to be replaced by Mycenaean imports.

==== Late Cycladic: Mycenaean domination ====
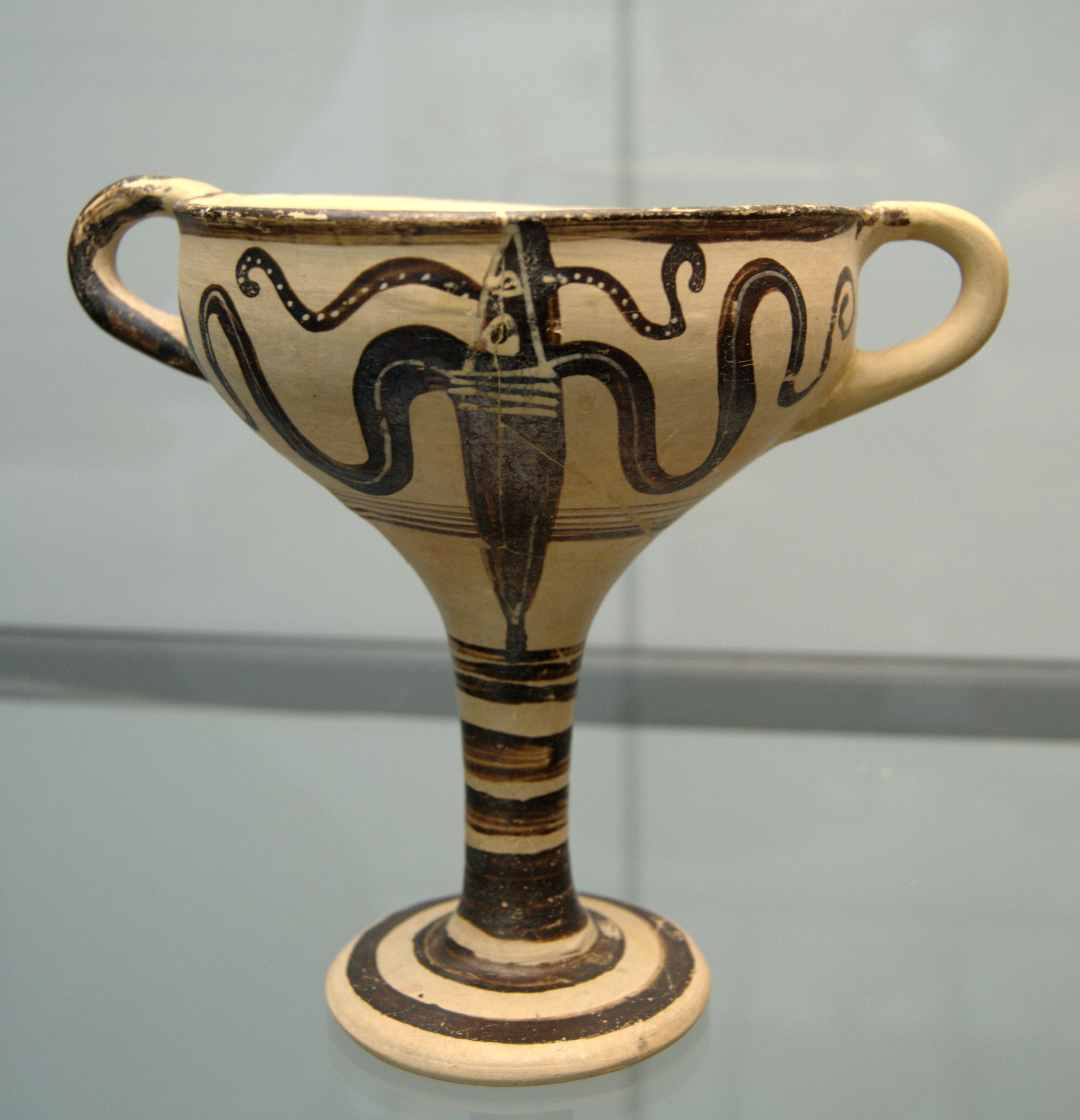
Mycenaean vase decorated with a squid.

Between the middle of the 15th century BC and the middle of the 11th century BC, relations between the Cyclades and the continent went through three phases. Right around 1250 BC (Late Helladic III A-B1 or beginning of Late Cycladic III), Mycenaean influence was felt only on Delos, at Aghia Irini (on Kea), at Phylakopi (on Milos) and perhaps at Grotta (on Naxos). Certain buildings call to mind the continental palaces, without definite proof, but typically Mycenaean elements have been found in religious sanctuaries. During the time of troubles accompanied by destruction that the continental kingdoms experienced (Late Helladic III B), relations cooled, going so far as to stop (as indicated by the disappearance of Mycenaean objects from the corresponding strata on the islands). Moreover, some island sites built fortifications or improved their defenses (such as Phylakopi, but also Aghios Andreas on Siphnos and Koukounaries on Paros). Relations were resumed during Late Helladic III C. To the importation of objects (jars with handles decorated with squids) was also added the movement of peoples with migrations coming from the continent. A beehive tomb, characteristic of continental Mycenaean tombs, has been found on Mykonos. The Cyclades were continuously occupied until the Mycenaean civilisation began to decline.

== Geometric, Archaic and Classical Eras ==
=== Ionian arrival ===
The Ionians came from the continent around the 10th century BC, setting up the great religious sanctuary of Delos around three centuries later. The Homeric Hymn to Apollo (the first part of which may date to the 7th century BC) alludes to Ionian panegyrics (which included athletic competitions, songs and dances). Archaeological excavations have shown that a religious centre was built on the ruins of a settlement dating to the Middle Cycladic.

It was between the 12th and the 8th centuries BC that the first Cycladic cities were built, including four on Kea (Ioulis, Korissia, Piessa and Karthaia) and Zagora on Andros, the houses of which were surrounded by a wall dated by archaeologists to 850 BC. Ceramics indicate the diversity of local production, and thus the differences between the islands. Hence, it seems that Naxos, the islet of Donoussa and above all Andros had links with Euboea, while Milos and Santorini were in the Doric sphere of influence.

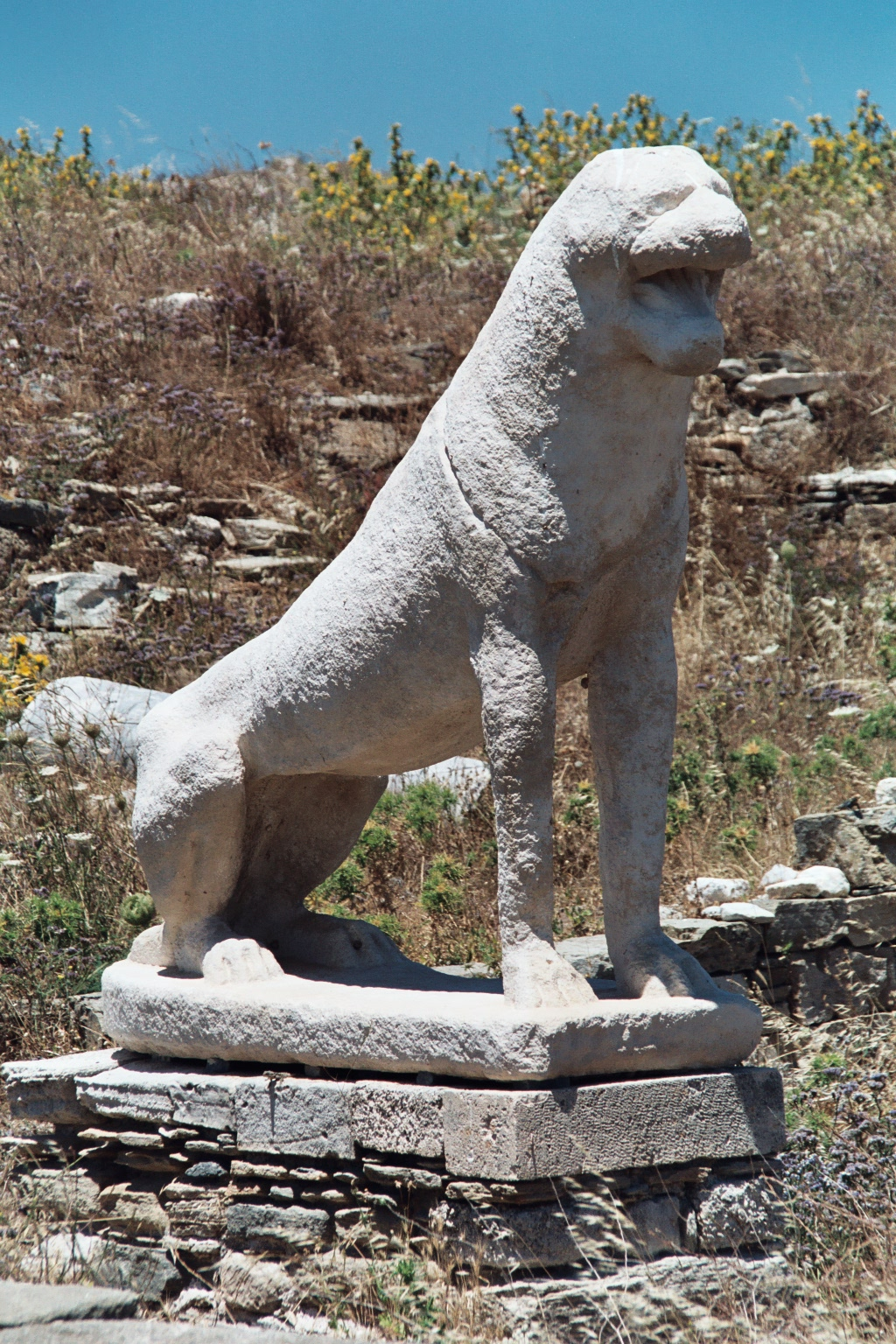
The Lion of Naxos on Delos.

Zagora, one of the most important urban settlements of the era which it has been possible to study, reveals that the type of traditional buildings found there evolved little between the 9th century BC and the 19th century. The houses had flat roofs made of schist slabs covered up with clay and truncated corners designed to allow beasts of burden to pass by more easily.

=== A new apogee ===
From the 8th century BC, the Cyclades experienced an apogee linked in great part to their natural riches (obsidian from Milos and Sifnos, silver from Syros, pumice stone from Santorini and marble, chiefly from Paros). This prosperity can also be seen from the relatively weak participation of the islands in the movement of Greek colonisation, other than Santorini's establishment of Cyrene. Cycladic cities celebrated their prosperity through great sanctuaries: the treasury of Sifnos, the Naxian column at Delphi or the terrace of lions offered by Naxos to Delos.

=== Classical Era ===
The wealth of the Cycladic cities thus attracted the interest of their neighbours. Shortly after the treasury of Sifnos at Delphi was built, forces from Samos pillaged the island in 524 BC. At the end of the 6th century BC, Lygdamis, tyrant of Naxos, ruled some of the other islands for a time.

The Persians tried to take the Cyclades near the beginning of the 5th century BC. Aristagoras, nephew of Histiaeus, tyrant of Miletus, launched an expedition with Artaphernes, satrap of Lydia, against Naxos. He hoped to control the entire archipelago after taking this island. On the way there, Aristagoras quarreled with the admiral Megabetes, who betrayed the force by informing Naxos of the fleet's approach. The Persians temporarily renounced their ambitions in the Cyclades due to the Ionian revolt.

==== Median Wars ====
When Darius launched his expedition against Greece, he ordered Datis and Artaphernes to take the Cyclades. They sacked Naxos, Delos was spared for religious reasons while Sifnos, Serifos and Milos preferred to submit and give up hostages. Thus the islands passed under Persian control. After Marathon, Miltiades set out to reconquer the archipelago, but he failed before Paros. The islanders provided the Persian fleet with sixty-seven ships, but on the eve of the Battle of Salamis, six or seven Cycladic ships (from Naxos, Kea, Kythnos, Serifos, Sifnos and Milos) would pass from the Greek side. Thus the islands won the right to appear on the tripod consecrated at Delphi.

Themistocles, pursuing the Persian fleet across the archipelago, also sought to punish the islands most compromised with regard to the Persians, a prelude to Athenian domination.

In 479 BC, certain Cycladic cities (on Kea, Milos, Tinos, Naxos and Kythnos) were present beside other Greeks at the Battle of Plataea, as attested by the pedestal of the statue consecrated to Zeus the Olympian, described by Pausanias.

==== Delian Leagues ====
When the Median danger had been beaten back from the territory of continental Greece and combat was taking place in the islands and in Ionia (Asia Minor), the Cyclades entered into an alliance that would avenge Greece and pay back the damages caused by the Persians’ pillages of their possessions. This alliance was organised by Athens and is commonly called the first Delian League. From 478-477 BC, the cities in coalition provided either ships (for example Naxos) or especially a tribute of silver. The amount of treasure owed was fixed at four hundred talents, which were deposited in the sanctuary of Apollo on the sacred island of Delos.

Rather quickly, Athens began to behave in an authoritarian manner toward its allies, before bringing them under its total domination. Naxos revolted in 469 BC and became the first allied city to be transformed into a subject state by Athens, following a siege. The treasury was transferred from Delos to the Acropolis of Athens around 454 BC. Thus the Cyclades entered the “district” of the islands (along with Imbros, Lesbos and Skyros) and no longer contributed to the League except through installments of silver, the amount of which was set by the Athenian Assembly. The tribute was not too burdensome, except after a revolt, when it was increased as punishment. Apparently, Athenian domination sometimes took the form of cleruchies (for example on Naxos and Andros).

At the beginning of the Peloponnesian War, all the Cyclades except Milos and Santorini were subjects of Athens. Thus, Thucydides writes that soldiers from Kea, Andros and Tinos participated in the Sicilian Expedition and that these islands were “tributary subjects”.

The Cyclades paid a tribute until 404 BC. After that, they experienced a relative period of autonomy before entering the second Delian League and passing under Athenian control once again.

According to Quintus Curtius Rufus, after (or at the same time as) the Battle of Issus, a Persian counter-attack led by Pharnabazus led to an occupation of Andros and Sifnos.

=== Hellenistic Era ===
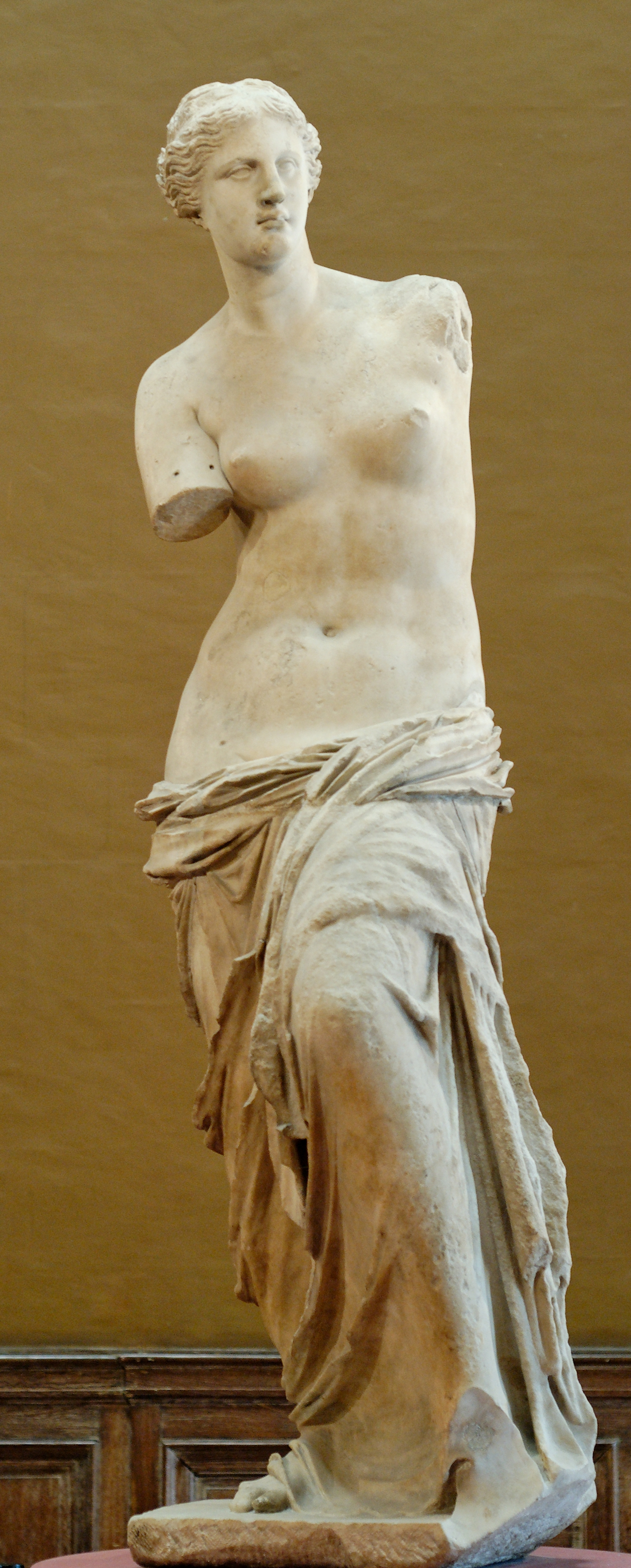
The Venus de Milo, one of the most famous Hellenistic sculptures, a sign of the Cyclades' dynamism during this period.

==== An archipelago disputed among the Hellenistic kingdoms ====
According to Demosthenes and Diodorus Siculus, the Thessalian tyrant Alexander of Pherae led pirate expeditions in the Cyclades around 362-360 BC. His ships appear to have taken over several ships from the islands, among them Tinos, and brought back a large number of slaves. The Cyclades revolted during the Third Sacred War (357-355 BC), which saw the intervention of Philip II of Macedon against Phocis, allied with Pherae. Thus they began to pass into the orbit of Macedonia.

In their struggle for influence, the leaders of the Hellenistic kingdoms often proclaimed their desire to maintain the “liberty” of the Greek cities, in reality controlled by them and often occupied by garrisons.

Thus in 314 BC, Antigonus I Monophthalmus created the Nesiotic League around Tinos and its renowned sanctuary of Poseidon and Amphitrite, less affected by politics than Apollo's sanctuary on Delos. Around 308 BC, the Egyptian fleet of Ptolemy I Soter sailed around the archipelago during an expedition in the Peloponnese and “liberated” Andros. The Nesiotic League would slowly be raised to the level of a federal state in the service of the Antigonids, and Demetrius I relied on it during his naval campaigns.

The islands then passed under Ptolemaic domination. During the Chremonidean War, mercenary garrisons had been set up on certain islands, among them Santorini, Andros and Kea. But, defeated at the Battle of Andros sometime between 258 and 245 BC, the Ptolemies ceded them to Macedon, then ruled by Antigonus II Gonatas. However, because of the revolt of Alexander, son of Craterus, the Macedonians were not able to exercise complete control over the archipelago, which entered a period of instability. Antigonus III Doson put the islands under control once again when he attacked Caria or when he destroyed the Spartan forces at Sellasia in 222 BC. Demetrius of Pharos then ravaged the archipelago and was driven away from it by the Rhodians.

Philip V of Macedon, after the Second Punic War, turned his attention to the Cyclades, which he ordered the Aetolian pirate Dicearchus to ravage before taking control and installing garrisons on Andros, Paros and Kythnos.

After the Battle of Cynoscephalae, the islands passed to Rhodes and then to the Romans. Rhodes would give new momentum to the Nesiotic League.

==== Hellenistic society ====
In his work on Tinos, Roland Étienne evokes a society dominated by an agrarian and patriarchal “aristocracy” marked by strong endogamy. These few families had many children and derived part of their resources from a financial exploitation of the land (sales, rents, etc.), characterised by Étienne as “rural racketeering”. This “real estate market” was dynamic due to the number of heirs and the division of inheritances at the time they were handed down. Only the purchase and sale of land could build up coherent holdings. Part of these financial resources could also be invested in commercial activities.

This endogamy might take place at the level of social class, but also at that of the entire body of citizens. It is known that the inhabitants of Delos, although living in a city with numerous foreigners—who sometimes outnumbered citizens—practiced a very strong form of civic endogamy throughout the Hellenistic period. Although it is not possible to say whether this phenomenon occurred systematically in all the Cyclades, Delos remains a good indicator of how society may have functioned on the other islands. In fact, populations circulated more widely in the Hellenistic period than in previous eras: of 128 soldiers quartered in the garrison at Santorini by the Ptolemies, the great majority came from Asia Minor; at the end of the 1st century BC, Milos had a large Jewish population. Whether the status of citizen should be maintained was debated.

The Hellenistic era left an imposing legacy for certain of the Cyclades: towers in large numbers—on Amorgos; on Sifnos, where 66 were counted in 1991; and on Kea, where 27 were identified in 1956. Not all could have been observation towers, as is often conjectured. The great number of them on Sifnos was associated with the island's mineral riches, but this quality did not exist on Kea or Amorgos, which instead had other resources, such as agricultural products. Thus the towers appear to have reflected the islands’ prosperity during the Hellenistic era.

==== The commercial power of Delos ====
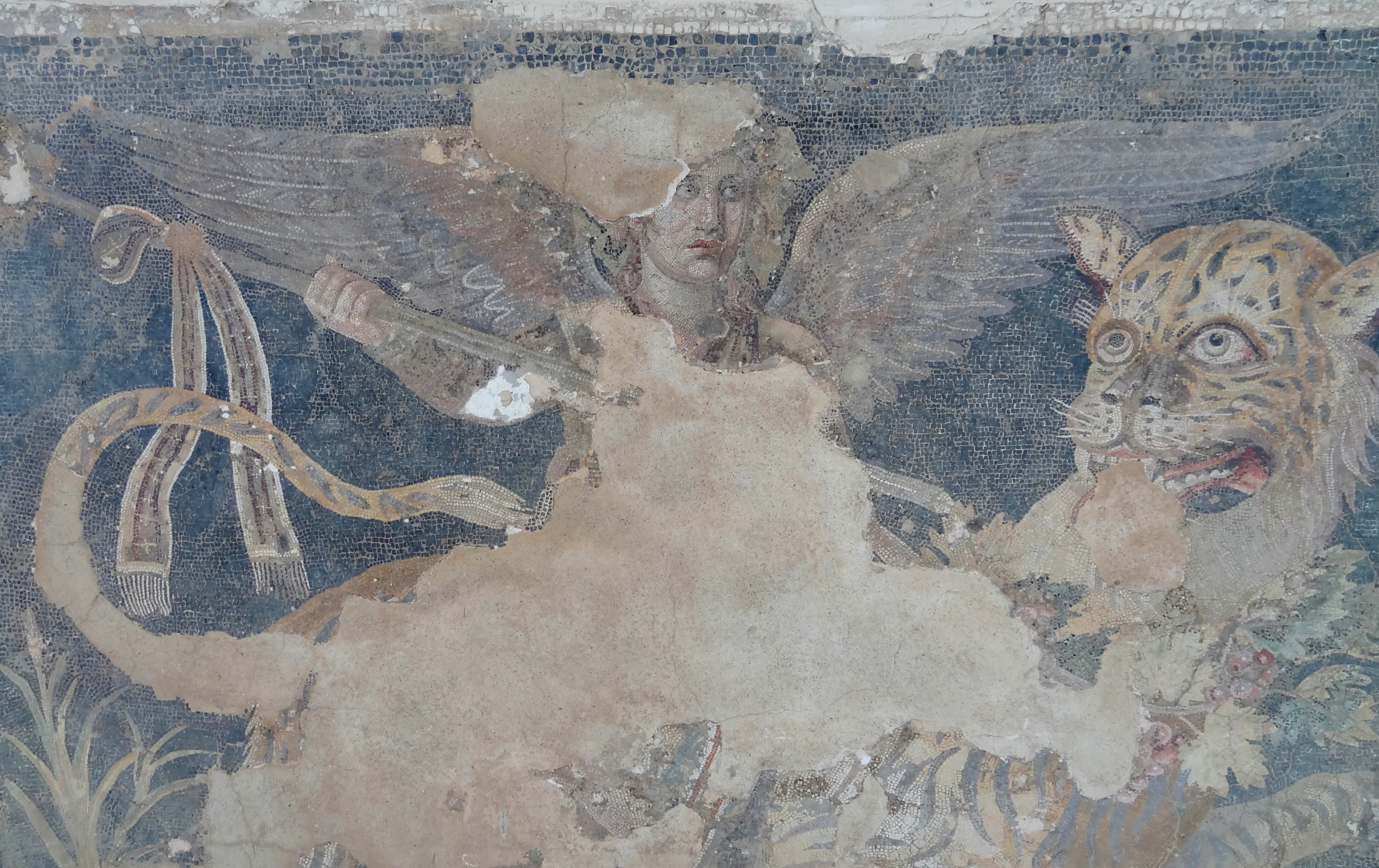
A Hellenistic Greek mosaic depicting the god Dionysos as a winged daimon riding on a tiger, from the House of Dionysos at Delos in the South Aegean region of Greece, late 2nd century BC, Archaeological Museum of Delos

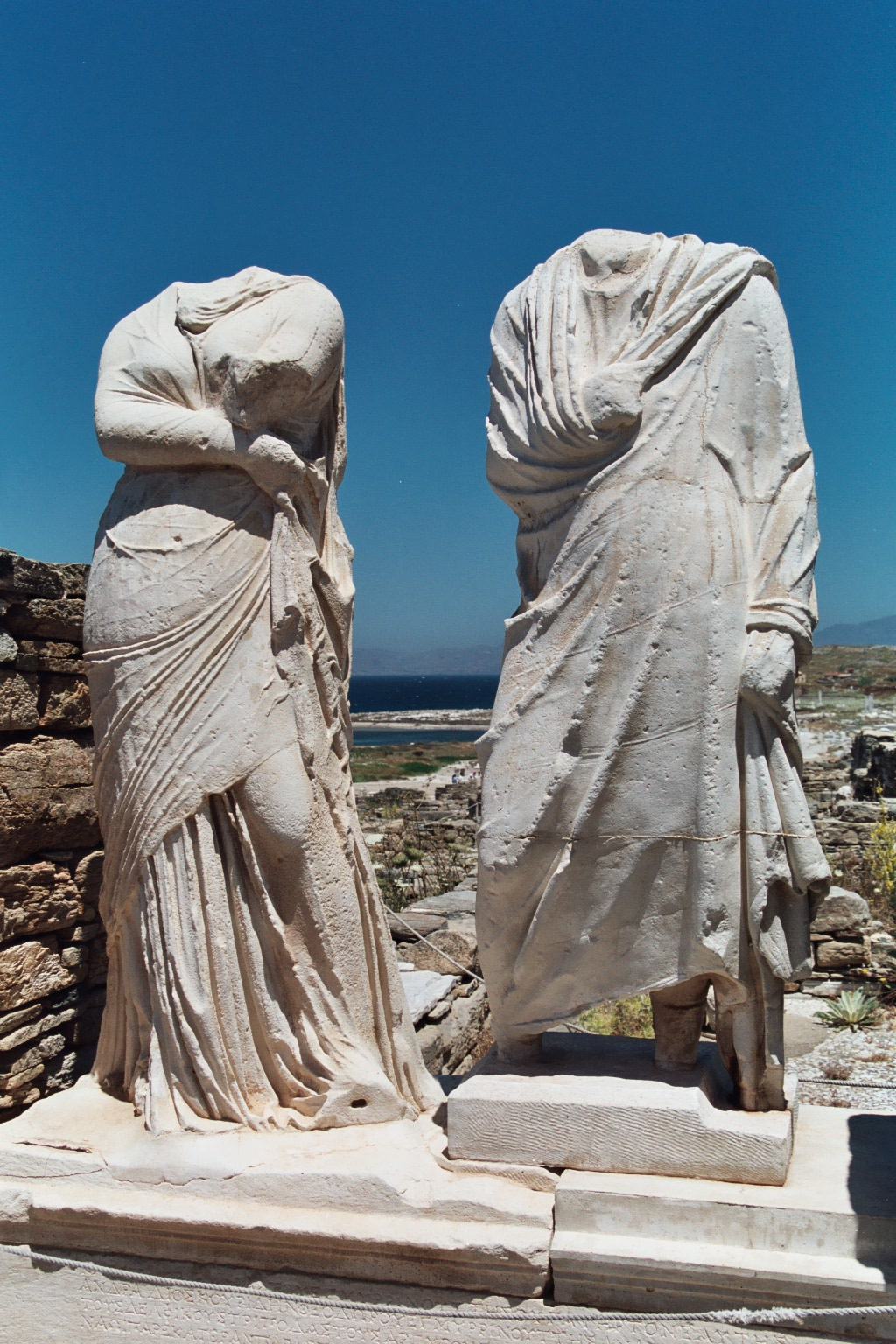
Statues from the "House of Cleopatra" on Delos.

When Athens controlled it, Delos was solely a religious sanctuary. A local commerce existed and already, the “bank of Apollo” approved loans, principally to Cycladic cities. In 314 BC, the island obtained its independence, although its institutions were a facsimile of the Athenian ones. Its membership in the Nesiotic League placed it in the orbit of the Ptolemies until 245 BC. Banking and commercial activity (in wheat storehouses and slaves) developed rapidly. In 167 BC, Delos became a free port (customs were no longer charged) and passed under Athenian control again. The island then experienced a true commercial explosion, especially after 146 BC, when the Romans, Delos’ protectors, destroyed one of its great commercial rivals, Corinth. Foreign merchants from throughout the Mediterranean set up business there, as indicated by the terrace of foreign gods. Additionally, a synagogue is attested on Delos as of the middle of the 2nd century BC. It is estimated that in the 2nd century BC, Delos had a population of about 25,000.

The notorious “agora of the Italians” was an immense slave market. The wars between Hellenistic kingdoms were the main source of slaves, as well as pirates (who assumed the status of merchants when entering the port of Delos). When Strabo (XIV, 5, 2) refers to ten thousand slaves being sold each day, it is necessary to add nuance to this claim, as the number could be the author's way of saying “many”. Moreover, a number of these “slaves” were sometimes prisoners of war (or people kidnapped by pirates) whose ransom was immediately paid upon disembarking.

This prosperity provoked jealousy and new forms of “economic exchanges”: in 298 BC, Delos transferred at least 5,000 drachmae to Rhodes for its “protection against pirates”; in the middle of the 2nd century BC, Aetolian pirates launched an appeal for bids to the Aegean world to negotiate the fee to be paid in exchange for protection against their exactions.

== Roman and Byzantine Empires ==
=== The Cyclades in Rome’s orbit ===
The reasons for Rome's intervention in Greece from the 3rd century BC are many: a call for help from the cities of Illyria; the fight against Philip V of Macedon, whose naval policy troubled Rome and who had been an ally of Hannibal’s; or assistance to Macedon’s adversaries in the region (Pergamon, Rhodes and the Achaean League). After his victory at Battle of Cynoscephalae, Flaminius proclaimed the “liberation” of Greece. Neither were commercial interests absent as a factor in Rome's involvement. Delos became a free port under the Roman Republic's protection in 167 BC. Thus Italian merchants grew wealthier, more or less at the expense of Rhodes and Corinth (finally destroyed the same year as Carthage in 146 BC). The political system of the Greek city, on the continent and on the islands, was maintained, indeed developed, during the first centuries of the Roman Empire.

According to certain historians, the Cyclades were included in the Roman province of Asia around 133-129 BC; others place them in the province of Achaea; at least, they were not divided between these two provinces. Definitive proof does not place the Cyclades in the province of Asia until the time of Vespasian and Domitian.

In 88 BC, Mithridates VI of Pontus, after expelling the Romans from Asia Minor, took an interest in the Aegean. His general Archelaus took Delos and most of the Cyclades, which he entrusted to Athens due to their declaration of favour for Mithridates. Delos managed to return to the Roman fold. As a punishment, the island was devastated by Mithridates’ troops. Twenty years later, it was destroyed once again, raided by pirates taking advantage of regional instability. The Cyclades then experienced a difficult period. The defeat of Mithridates by Sulla, Lucullus and then Pompey returned the archipelago to Rome. In 67 BC, Pompey caused piracy, which had arisen during various conflicts, to disappear from the region. He divided the Mediterranean into different sectors led by lieutenants. Marcus Terentius Varro Lucullus was put in charge of the Cyclades. Thus, Pompey brought back the possibility of a prosperous trade for the archipelago. However, it appears that a high cost of living, social inequalities and the concentration of wealth (and power) were the rule for the Cyclades during the Roman era, with their stream of abuse and discontent.

Augustus, having decided that those whom he exiled could only reside on islands more than 400 stadia (50 km) from the continent, the Cyclades became places of exile, chiefly Gyaros, Amorgos and Serifos.

Vespasian organised the Cycladic archipelago into a Roman province. Under Diocletian, there existed a “province of the islands” that included the Cyclades.

Christianisation seems to have occurred very early in the Cyclades. The catacombs at Trypiti on Milos, unique in the Aegean and in Greece, of very simple workmanship, as well as the very close baptismal fonts, confirm that a Christian community existed on the island at least from the 3rd or 4th century.

From the 4th century, the Cyclades again experienced the ravages of war. In 376, the Goths pillaged the archipelago.

=== Byzantine period ===
==== Administrative organisation ====
When the Roman Empire was divided, control over the Cyclades passed to the Byzantine Empire, which retained them until the 13th century.

At first, administrative organisation was based on small provinces. During the rule of Justinian I, the Cyclades, Cyprus and Caria, together with Moesia Secunda (present-day northern Bulgaria) and Scythia Minor (Dobruja), were brought together under the authority of the quaestura exercitus set up at Odessus (now Varna). Little by little, themes were put into place, starting with the reign of Heraclius at the beginning of the 7th century. In the 10th century the theme of the Aegean Sea was established; it included the Cyclades, the Sporades, Chios, Lesbos and Lemnos. In fact, the Aegean theme rather than an army supplied sailors to the imperial navy. It seems that later on, central government control over the little isolated entities that were the islands slowly diminished: defence and tax collection became increasingly difficult. At the beginning of the 12th century, they had become impossible; Constantinople had thus given up on maintaining them.

==== Conflicts and migrations among the islands ====
In 727, the islands revolted against the iconoclastic Emperor Leo the Isaurian. Cosmas, placed at the head of the rebellion, was proclaimed emperor, but perished during the siege of Constantinople. Leo brutally re-established his authority over the Cyclades by sending a fleet that used Greek fire.

In 769, the islands were devastated by the Slavs.

At the beginning of the 9th century, the Saracens, who controlled Crete from 829, threatened the Cyclades and sent raids there for more than a century. Naxos had to pay them a tribute. The islands were therefore partly depopulated: the Life of Saint Theoktistos of Lesbos says that Paros was deserted in the 9th century and that one only encountered hunters there. The Saracen pirates of Crete, having taken it during a raid on Lesbos in 837, would stop at Paros on the return journey and there attempt to pillage the church of Panaghia Ekatontopiliani; Nicetas, in the service of Leo VI the Wise, recorded the damages. In 904, Andros, Naxos and others of the Cyclades were pillaged by an Arab fleet returning from Thessaloniki, which it had just sacked.

It was during this period of the Byzantine Empire that the villages left the edge of the sea to higher ground in the mountains: Lefkes rather than Paroikia on Paros or the plateau of Traghea on Naxos. This movement, due to a danger at the base, also had positive effects. On the largest islands, the interior plains were fertile and suitable for new development. Thus it was during the 11th century, when Palaiopoli was abandoned in favour of the plain of Messaria on Andros, that the breeding of silkworms, which ensured the island's wealth until the 19th century, was introduced.

== Duchy of Naxos ==
The Duchy of Naxos.

In 1204, the Fourth Crusade took Constantinople, and the conquerors divided the Byzantine Empire amongst themselves. Nominal sovereignty over the Cyclades fell to the Crusaders, except Andros and Tinos. The islands were not occupied immediately, however, and for some time after an agreement was reached between the Venetians and the Latin Emperor, authorizing private citizens to conquer and hold the islands as long as they pledged allegiance to the Latin Empire for them. Numerous adventurers armed fleets at their own expense, among them a wealthy Venetian residing in Constantinople, Marco Sanudo, nephew of the Doge Enrico Dandolo. Without any difficulty, he took Naxos in 1205 and by 1207, he controlled the Cyclades, together with his comrades and relatives. His cousin Marino Dandolo became lord of Andros; other relatives, the brothers Andrea and Geremia Ghisi (or Ghizzi) became masters of Tinos and Mykonos. Marco Sanudo founded the Duchy of Naxos with the main islands such as Naxos, Paros, Antiparos, Milos, Sifnos, Kythnos and Syros. The Dukes of Naxos became vassals of the Latin Emperor of Constantinople in 1210, and imposed the Western feudal system on the islands they ruled. In the Cyclades, Sanudo was the suzerain and the others his vassals. Thus, Venice didn't profit directly from this conquest, but found advantages there: the archipelago had been rid of pirates, and also of the Genoese, and the trade route to Constantinople made safer. Population centres began to descend back toward the coasts and once there, were fortified by their Latin lords; examples include Paroikia on Paros, and the ports on Naxos and Antiparos.

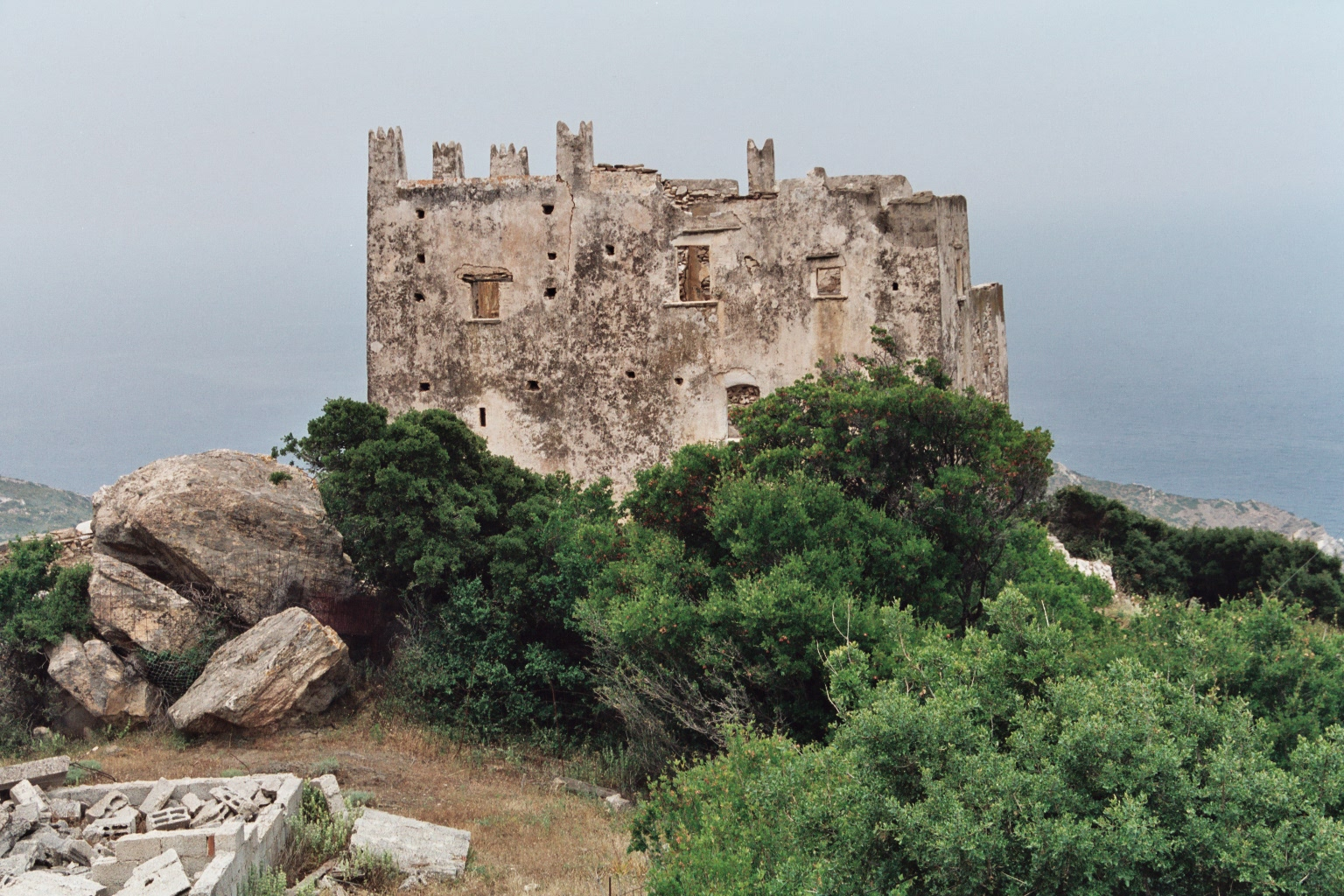
A tower called “Venetian” during the Naxiot campaign.

The customary law of the Principality of Achaea, the Assizes of Romania, quickly became the base of legislation for the islands. In effect, from 1248, the Duke of Naxos became the vassal of William II of Villehardouin and thus from 1278 of Charles I of Naples. The feudal system was applied even for the smallest properties, which had the effect of creating an important local elite. The “Frankish" nobles reproduced the seigneurial lifestyle they had left behind; they built “châteaux” where they maintained courts. The links of marriage were added to those of vassalage. The fiefs circulated and were fragmented over the course of successive dowries and inheritances. Thus, in 1350, fifteen seigneurs, of whom eleven were of the Michieli family, held Kea (120 km^{2} in area and, at the time, numbering several dozen families).

However, this "Frankish" feudal system (the Greek term since the Crusades for everything that came from the West) was superimposed on the Byzantine administrative system, preserved by the new seigneurs; taxes and feudal corvées were applied based on Byzantine administrative divisions and the farming of fiefs continued according to Byzantine techniques. Byzantine property and marriage law also remained in effect for the local population of Greek origin. The same situation existed in the religious sphere: although the Catholic hierarchy was dominant, the Orthodox hierarchy endured and sometimes, when the Catholic priest was unavailable, mass would be celebrated by his Orthodox counterpart. The two cultures mixed tightly. One can see this in the motifs on the embroidery popular on the Cyclades; Italian and Venetian influences are markedly present there.

In the 1260s and 1270s, admirals Alexios Doukas Philanthropenos and Licario launched an attempt to reconquer the Aegean on behalf of Michael VIII Palaiologos, the Byzantine Emperor. This failed to take Paros and Naxos, but certain islands were conquered and kept by the Byzantines between 1263 and 1278. In 1292, Roger of Lauria devastated Andros, Tinos, Mykonos and Kythnos, perhaps as a consequence of the war then raging between Venice and Genoa. At the beginning of the 14th century, the Catalans made their appearance in the islands, shortly before the Turks. In effect, the decline of the Seljuks left the field open in Asia Minor to a certain number of Turkmen principalities, those of which were closest to the sea began launching raids on the archipelago from 1330 in which the islands were regularly pillaged and their inhabitants taken into slavery. Thus the Cyclades experienced a demographic decline. Even when the Ottomans began to impose themselves and unify Anatolia, the expeditions continued until the middle of the 15th century, in part because of the conflict between the Venetians and the Ottomans.

The Duchy of Naxos temporarily passed under Venetian protection in 1499-1500 and 1511-1517. Around 1520, the ancient fiefs of the Ghisi (Tinos and Mykonos) passed under the direct control of the Republic of Venice.

== Ottoman period ==
=== Conquest and administration of the islands ===
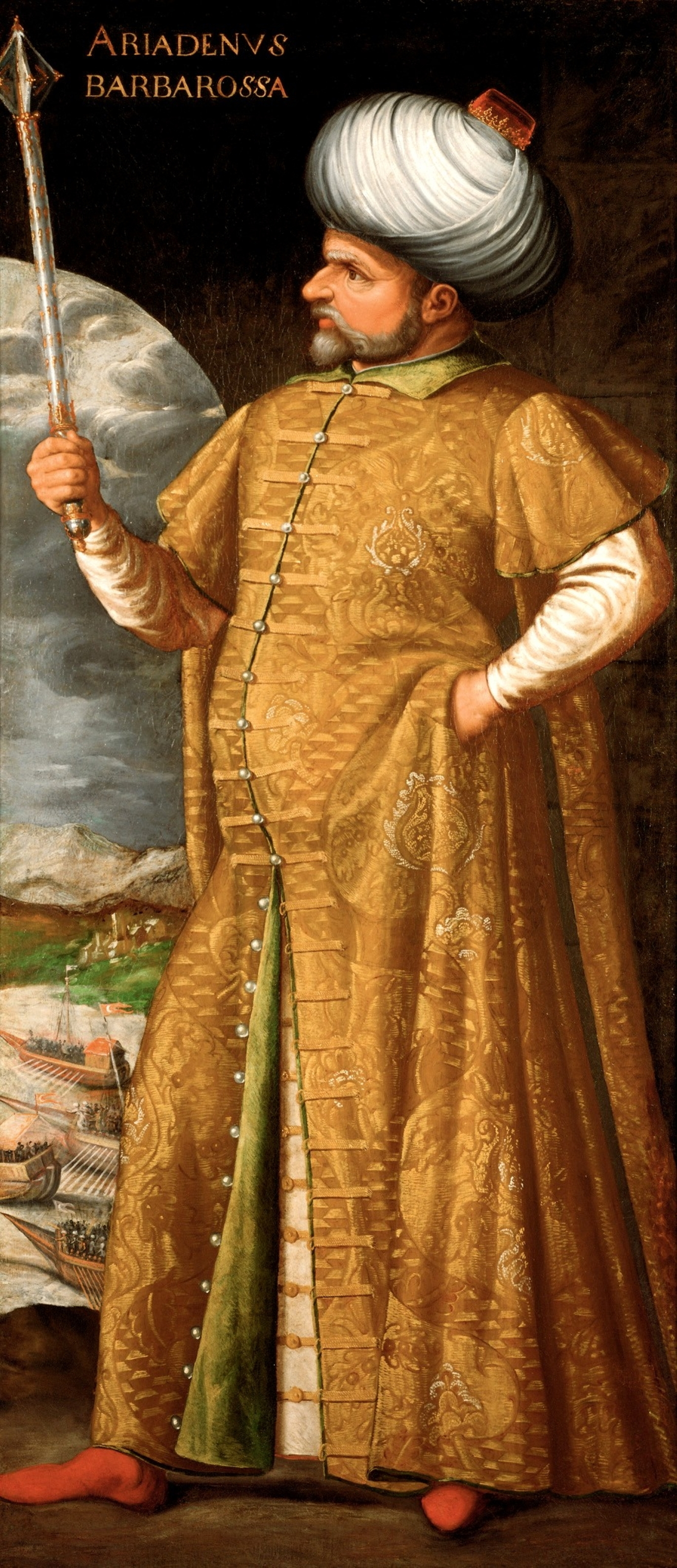
Barbarossa

Hayreddin Barbarossa, Grand Admiral of the Ottoman Navy, took the islands for the Turks in two raids, in 1537 and 1538. The last to submit was Tinos, in Venetian hands since 1390, in 1715.

This conquest posed a problem for the Sublime Porte. It was not possible, financially and militarily, to leave a garrison on each island. Moreover, the war it was conducting was against Venice, not against the other Western powers. Thus, as Sifnos belonged to a Bolognese family, the Gozzadini, and the Porte was not at war with Bologna, it allowed this family to govern the island. Likewise, the Sommaripa had Andros. They argued that they were in fact French, originally from the banks of the Somme (Sommaripa being the Italianised form of Sommerive), so as to pass under the protection of the capitulations. Elsewhere too, it was easier, using this model, to leave in place the ruling families who passed under Ottoman suzerainty. The largest of the Cyclades kept their Latin seigneurs, but paid an annual tax to the Porte as a sign of their new vassalage. Four of the smallest islands found themselves under direct Ottoman administration. Meanwhile, John IV Crispo, who governed the Duchy of Naxos between 1518 and 1564, maintained a sumptuous court, attempting to imitate the Western Renaissance. Giovanfrancesco Sommaripa, seigneur of Andros, made himself hated by his subjects. Moreover, in the 1560s, the coalition between the Pope, the Venetians and the Spaniards (the future Holy League that would triumph at Lepanto) was being put in place, and the Latin seigneurs of the Cyclades were being sought out and seemed ready to join the effort (financially and militarily). Finally, the Barbary pirates also continued to pillage the islands from time to time. Eventually the islanders sent a delegation to Constantinople to plead that they could no longer continue to serve two masters. The Duchy of Naxos, to which Andros had been added, was passed to Joseph Nasi, a confidant of the Sultan in 1566. He never visited “his” islands, leaving their administration to a local nobleman, Coronello. However, as the islands were his direct and personal holding, Ottoman administration was never imposed there. Landed properties were left untouched, unlike in other Christian lands conquered by the Ottomans. Indeed, they were left in the hands of their ancient feudal owners, who kept their traditional customs and privileges.

After Nasi died, several seigneurs of Naxos followed, more and more virtual in nature, and little by little, the islands slid under normal Ottoman administration. They were granted to the Kapudan Pasha (grand admiral of the Ottoman navy), which is to say that their income went to him. He only went there once a year, with his entire fleet, to receive the sum total of taxes owed to him. It was in the Bay of Drios, to the southeast of Paros, that he would drop anchor.

At the same time, the Divan only very rarely sent officers and governors to direct the Cyclades in its own name. There were attempts to install kadis and beys on each large island, but Christian pirates kidnapped them in such great numbers to sell them to Malta that the Porte had to abandon such plans. Afterward, the islands were only ruled from afar. Local magistrates, often called epitropes, governed locally; their principal role was tax collection. In 1580, the Porte, through an ahdname (agreement), granted privileges to the largest of the Cyclades (those of the Duchy of Joseph Nasi). In exchange for an annual tribute that comprised a poll tax and military protection, the Christian landowners (Catholic and Orthodox) kept their lands and their dominant position, negotiating taxes for their community.

Thus a specific local law came into being, a mixture of feudal customs, Byzantine traditions, Orthodox canon law and Ottoman demands, all adapted to the particular island's situation. This legal idiosyncrasy meant that only native-born authorities could untangle cases. Even the language of the documents issued was a mixture of Italian, Greek and Turkish. This was an additional reason for the absence of Ottoman administration.

=== Population and economy ===
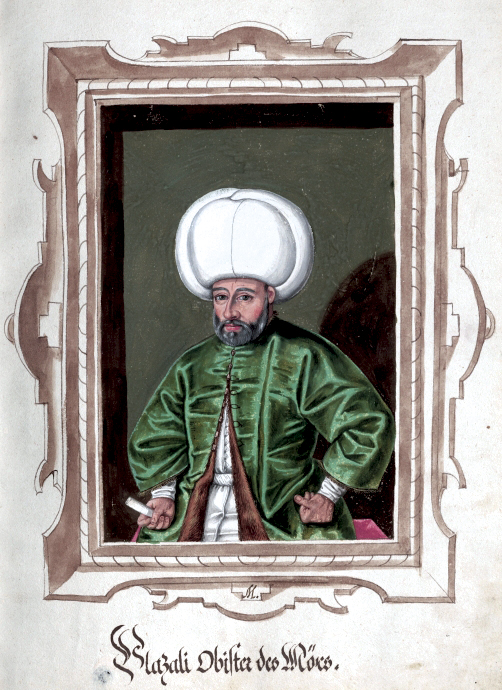
Uluç Ali Reis, Chief Admiral

Economically and demographically, the Cyclades had suffered harshly from the exactions first of Turkmen and Barbary pirates, then later (in the 17th century) Christian pirates. After the defeat at Lepanto, Uluç Ali Reis, the new Kapudan Pasha, initiated a policy of repopulating the islands. For example, in 1579 the Orthodox priest Pothetos of Amorgos was authorised to settle colonists on Ios, a nearly deserted island. Kimolos, pillaged by Christian pirates in 1638, was repopulated with Sifniot colonists in 1646. Christian Albanians, who had already migrated toward the Peloponnese during the Despotate of the Morea period or who had been moved to Kythnos by the Venetians, were invited by the Ottoman Empire to come settle on Andros.

The regular passage of pirates, of whatever origin, had another consequence: quarantines were clearly not obeyed and epidemics would ravage the islands. Thus, the plague descended on Milos in 1687, 1688 and 1689, each time for more than three months. The epidemic of 1689 claimed 700 lives out of a total population of 4,000. The plague returned in 1704, accompanied by anthrax, and killed nearly all the island's children.

The absence of land distribution to Muslim settlers, along with the Turks’ lack of interest in the sea, not to mention the danger posed by Christian pirates, meant that very few Turks moved to the islands. Only Naxos received several Turkish families.

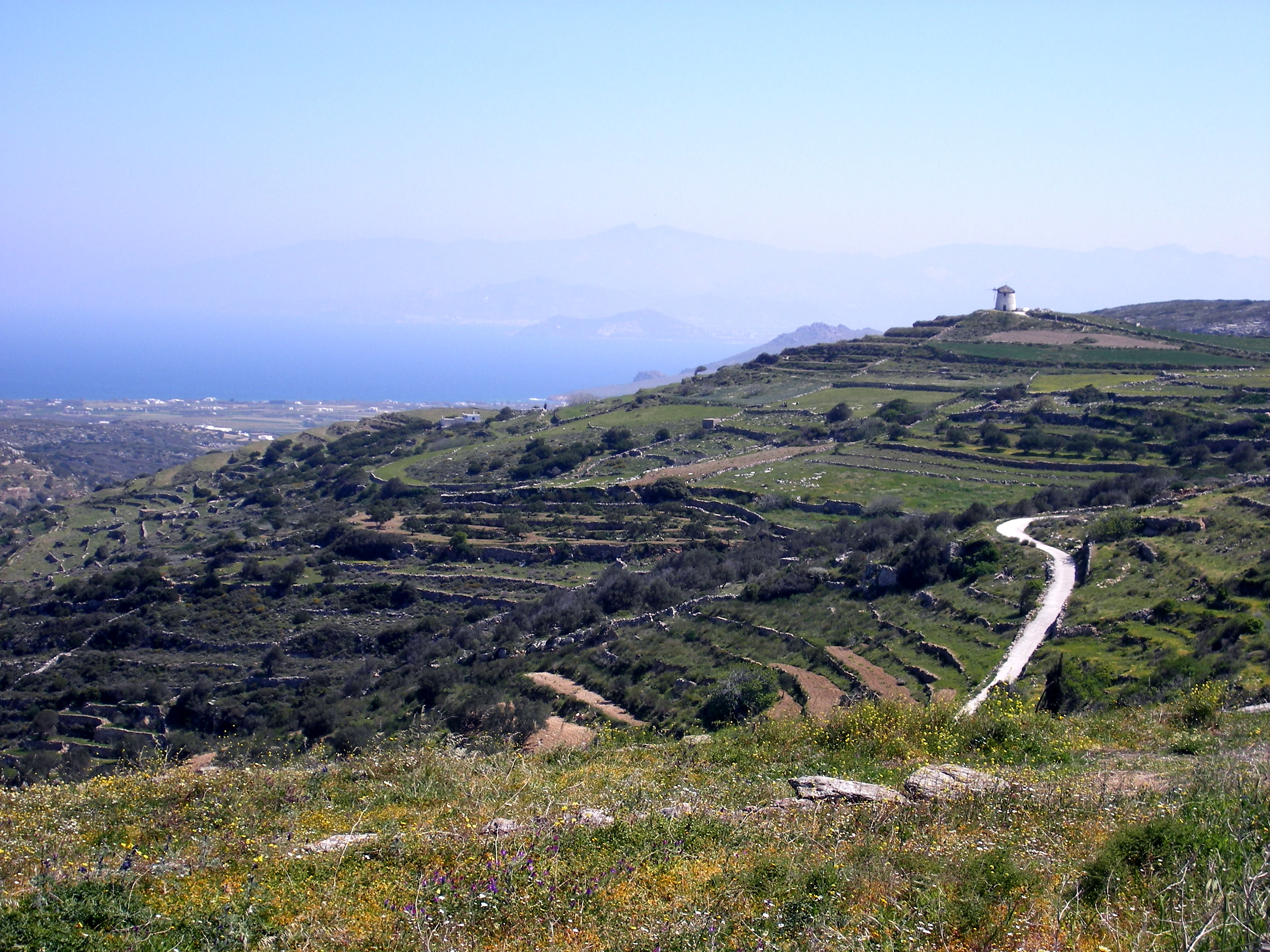
Paros, fertile island.

The Cyclades had limited resources and depended on imports for their food supply. The large islands (chiefly Naxos and Paros) were as a matter of course the most fertile due to their mountains, which retained water, and due to their coastal plains.

The little that was produced on the islands went, as it had since prehistory, toward an intense trade that allowed resources to be shared in common. The wine of Santorini, the wood of Folegandros, the salt of Milos or the wheat of Sikinos circulated within the archipelago. Silkworms were raised on Andros and the raw material was spun on Tinos and Kea. Not all products were destined for the local market: Milos sent its millstone all the way to France and Sifnos’ straw hats (the production of which the Frankish seigneurs had introduced) also left for the West. In 1700, a very lean year, the port of Marseille received eleven boats and thirty-seven dinghies coming from the Cyclades. Also entering the city that year were 231,000 lbs of wheat; 150,000 lbs of oil; 58,660 lbs of silk from Tinos; 14,400 lbs of cheese; 7,635 lbs of wool; 5,019 lbs of rice; 2,833 lbs of lambskin; 2,235 lbs of cotton; 1,881 lbs of wax; 1,065 lbs of sponge.

The Cyclades were also the centre of a contraband wheat trade to the West. In years with good harvests, the profits were large, but in years of poor harvests, the activity depended on the good will of the Ottoman authorities, who desired either a larger share of the wealth or career advancement by making themselves noticed in a fight against this smuggling. These fluctuations were sufficiently important for Venice to follow closely the nominations of Ottoman “officers” in the Archipelago.

Thus, commercial activity retained its importance for the Cyclades. Part of this activity was linked to piracy, not including contraband. Certain traders had specialised in the purchase of plunder and the supply of provisions. Others had developed a service economy oriented toward these pirates: it encompassed taverns and prostitutes. At the end of the 17th century, the islands where they wintered made a living only due to their presence: Milos, Mykonos and above all Kimolos, which owed its Latin name, Argentieri, as much to the colour of its beaches or its mythical silver mines as to the amounts spent by the pirates. This situation brought about a differentiation between the islands themselves: on the one hand the piratical islands (chiefly these three), and on the other, the law-abiding ones, headed by the devoutly Orthodox Sifnos, where the Cyclades’ first Greek school opened in 1687 and where women even covered their faces.

During the wars that pitted Venice against the Ottoman Empire for possession of Crete, the Venetians led a great counter-attack in 1656 that allowed them to close off the Dardanelles efficiently. Thus the Ottoman navy was unable to protect the Cyclades, which were systematically exploited by the Venetians for a dozen years. The Cycladic proverb, “Better to be massacred by the Turk than be given as fodder to the Venetian” seems to date to the period of these exactions. When the Ottoman navy managed to break the Venetian blockade and the Westerners were forced to retreat, the latter ravaged the islands; forests and olive groves were destroyed and all livestock was stolen. Once again the Cycladic economy began to suffer.

=== The Cyclades: a battleground between Orthodox and Catholics ===
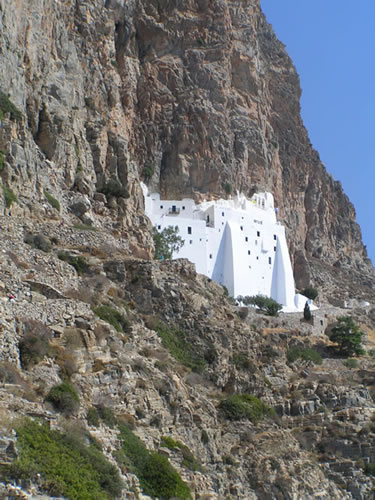
The monastery of Panaghia Chozoviotisa on Amorgos.

The Sultan, like everywhere else in his Greek territories, favoured the Greek Orthodox Church. He considered the Ecumenical Patriarch as the leader of the Greeks within the Empire. The latter was responsible for Greeks’ good behaviour, and in exchange he was given extensive power over the Greek community as well as the privileges he had secured under the Byzantine Empire. In the whole Empire, the Orthodox had been organised into a millet, but not the Catholics. Moreover, in the Cyclades, Catholicism was the religion of the Venetian enemy. Orthodoxy thus took advantage of this protection to try and reconquer the terrain lost during the Latin occupation. In the rest of the Empire, the agricultural development of unoccupied land (the property of the Sultan) was often entrusted to religious orders and Muslim religious foundations. As the latter were absent on the islands, this function fell to the Orthodox monasteries. Tournefort, visiting the Cyclades in 1701, counted up these Orthodox monasteries: thirteen on Milos, six on Sifnos, at least one on Serifos, sixteen on Paros, at least seven on Naxos, one on Amorgos, several on Mykonos, five on Kea and at least three on Andros (information is missing for the remaining islands). Only three had been founded during the Byzantine era: Panaghia Chozoviotissa on Amorgos (11th century), Panaghia Panachrantos on Andros (10th century) and Profitis Elias (1154) on Sifnos, all the rest belonging to the wave of Orthodox reconquest under Ottoman protection. The numerous monasteries founded during the Ottoman period were privately established by individuals on their own lands. These establishments are proof of a social evolution on the islands. Certainly, in general, the great Catholic families converted little by little, but this is insufficient to explain the number of new monasteries. It must be concluded that a new Greek Orthodox elite emerged which took advantage of the weakening of society during the Ottoman conquest to acquire landed property. Their wealth was later cemented through the profits from commercial and naval enterprises. At the beginning of the 17th century, the Orthodox reconversion was practically complete. It is in this context that the Catholic counter-offensive is situated.

Catholic missionaries, for instance, envisioned the start of a crusade. Père Saulger, Superior of the Jesuits on Naxos, was a personal friend of Louis XIV’s confessor, Père La Chaise. In vain, he used this influence to push the French king to launch a crusade.

The Cyclades had six Catholic bishoprics: on Santorini, Syros, Naxos, Tinos, Andros and Milos. They were part of the policy of a Catholic presence, for the number of parishioners did not justify so many bishops. In the middle of the 17th century, the diocese of Andros contained fifty Catholics; that of Milos, thirteen. Indeed, the Catholic Church showed itself to be very active in the islands during the 17th century, taking advantage of the fact that it was under the protection of the French and Venetian ambassadors at Constantinople, and of the wars between Venice and the Ottoman Empire, which weakened the Turks’ position in the archipelago. The Congregation for the Propagation of the Faith, the Catholic bishops and the Jesuit and Capuchin missionaries all tried to win over the Greek Orthodox inhabitants to the Catholic faith and at the same time to impose the Tridentine Mass on the existing Catholic community, to whom it had never been introduced.

The Capuchins were members of the Mission de Paris and thus under the protection of Louis XIV, who saw in this a way of reaffirming the prestige of the Most Christian King, but also to set up commercial and diplomatic footholds. Capuchin establishments were founded on Syros in 1627, on Andros in 1638 (whence they were driven out by the Venetians in 1645 and where they returned in 1700), on Naxos in 1652, on Milos in 1661 and on Paros, first in the north at Naoussa in 1675, then at Paroikia in 1680. The Jesuits were instead the instrument of Rome, even if they too benefited from French protection and were often of French origin. A Jesuit house was founded on Naxos in 1627, in part due to funding by the merchants of Rouen. They set up missions on Santorini (1642) and on Tinos (1670). A Franciscan mission was also founded in the 16th century on Naxos, and a Dominican friary was established on Santorini in 1595.

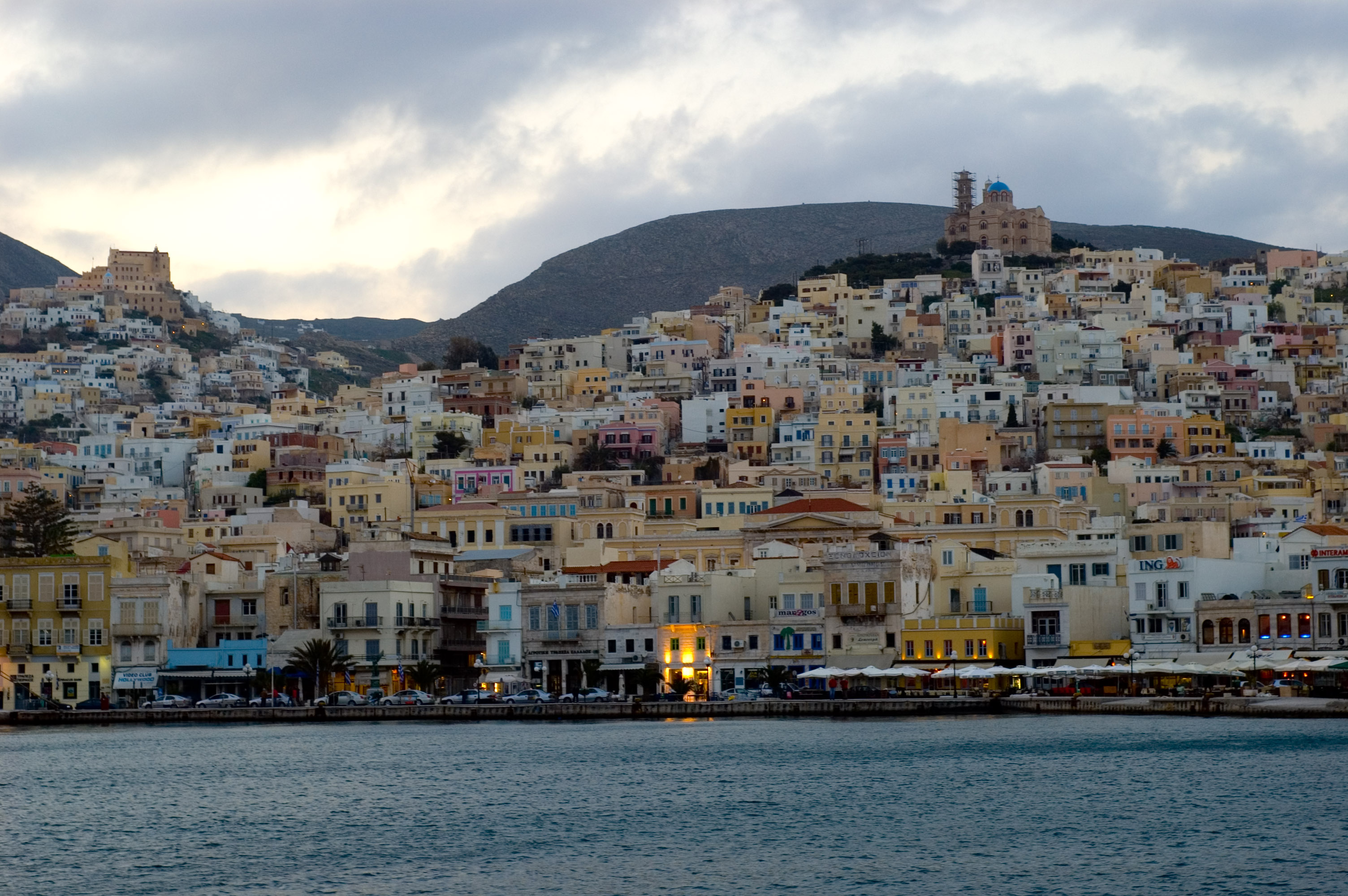
Ermopouli, the port of Syros, with its two cathedrals, Catholic and Orthodox, facing each other, each on its own hill.

Among their proselytizing activities, the Jesuits staged plays in which Jesuit priests and members of the particular island's Catholic high society performed. These plays were performed on Naxos, but also on Paros and Santorini, for more than a century. The subjects were religious and related to local culture: “to win more easily the heart of the Greeks and for this we presented the action in their vernacular and on the same day that the Greeks celebrate the feast of St. Chrysostom”.

By the 18th century, most of the Catholic missions had disappeared. The Catholic missionaries had failed to achieve their objectives, except on Syros, which to this day has a strong Catholic community. On Santorini, they merely managed to maintain the number of Catholics. On Naxos, despite a fall in the number of believers, a small Catholic core endured. Of course, Tinos, Venetian until 1715, remained a special case, with an important Catholic presence. Where they existed, the Catholic communities lived apart, well separated from the Orthodox: entirely Catholic villages on Naxos or a neighbourhood in the center of the island's main village. Thus, they too enjoyed a certain administrative autonomy, as they dealt directly with the Ottoman authorities, without passing through the Orthodox representatives of their island. For Catholics, this situation also created the feeling of being besieged by “the Orthodox enemy”. In 1800 and 1801, noteworthy Naxiot Catholics were attacked by part of the Orthodox population, led by Markos Politis.

=== Frankish piracy ===
When North Africa had been definitively integrated into the Ottoman Empire, and above all when the Cyclades passed to the Kapudan Pasha, there was no longer any question of the Barbary pirates continuing their raids there. Thus they were active in the western Mediterranean. In contrast, the Christians had been driven out of the Aegean after the Venetian defeats. As a result, they took the relay stations of the Muslim pirates in the Archipelago.

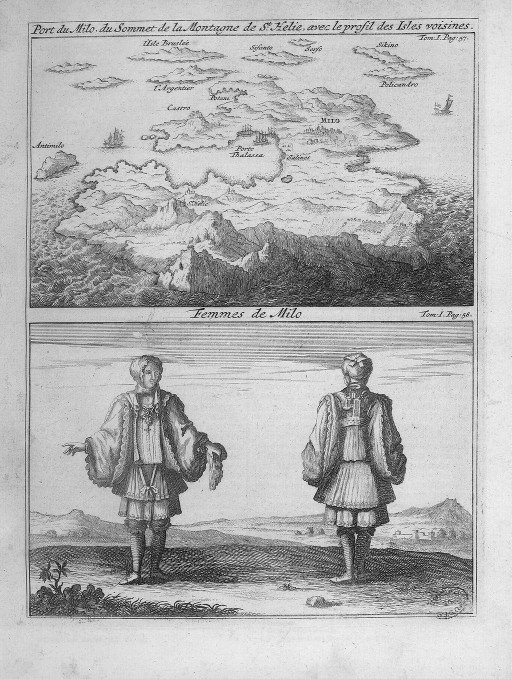
Milos, pirates' meeting place: map of the island and traditional women's costumes (Joseph Pitton de Tournefort, Voyage d'un botaniste.).

The principal objective was the commercial route between Egypt, its wheat and imposts (the Mamelukes’ tribute), and Constantinople. The pirates spent the winter (December–March) on Paros, Antiparos, Ios or Milos. In spring, they set up in the vicinity of Samos; then, at the beginning of summer, in Cypriot waters; and at the end of summer on the coast of Syria. At Samos and Cyprus, they attacked ships, while in Syria, they landed ashore and kidnapped wealthy Muslims whom they freed for ransom. In this way they maximized their loot, which they then spent in the Cyclades, where they returned for the winter.

The two most famous pirates were the brothers Téméricourt, originally from Vexin. The younger, Téméricourt-Beninville, was a knight of Malta. In spring 1668, with four frigates, they entered Ios harbour. When the Ottoman fleet, then sailing toward Crete as part of the war against Venice, tried to throw them out that 2 May, they fought it off by inflicting serious damage to it and thus made their reputation. Hugues Creveliers, nicknamed “the Hercules of the seas”, began his career slightly earlier, with the help of the Knights of Malta. He rapidly made his fortune and organised Christian piracy in the Cyclades. He had between twelve and fifteen ships under his direct command and had awarded his villa to twenty shipowners who benefited from his protection and transferred a portion of their earnings to him. He kept the islands afraid of him.

Their career came to a rather abrupt end: Téméricourt-Beninville was decapitated at the age of 22 in 1673 during a celebration marking the circumcision of one of the Sultan's sons; Creveliers and his shipmates jumped into the bay of Astypalaia in 1678.

These pirates considered themselves to be corsairs, but their situation was more ambiguous. Of Livornese, Corsican or French origin, the great majority of them were Catholic and acted under the more or less unofficial protection either of a religious order (the Knights of Malta or the Order of Saint Stephen of Livorno) or of the Western powers that sought either to maintain or initiate a presence in the region (Venice, France, Tuscany, Savoy or Genoa). Thus they were nearly corsairs, but liable at any moment to repudiation by their secret protectors, they could become pirates once again. Hence, when Venice surrendered in Crete, it had to agree by treaty to fight against piracy in the Aegean.

Jean Chardin relates thus the arrival at Mykonos of two Venetian ships in 1672:
“They entered there during the night. The admiral, while dropping anchor, launched flares. […] This was to warn the Christian corsairs who might be in the port to withdraw before daybreak. At the time, there were two of them. They set sail the next morning. […] The Republic had committed itself in the Treaty of Candia to drive out Christian corsairs alongside the Great Seigneur, […] making use of this attention to satisfy the Porte without acting at all against the corsairs”.

The Chevalier d'Arvieux also reports the ambiguous attitude of France toward Téméricourt-Beninville, which he witnessed in 1671. This attitude, also shared by the marquis de Nointel, Ambassador of France at Constantinople several years later, was a means of applying quasi-diplomatic pressure when the subject of renegotiating the capitulations came up. Likewise, the marquis de Fleury, considered a pirate, came to settle in the Cyclades with financial backing from the Marseille Chamber of Commerce at a moment when the renewal of the capitulations was being negotiated. Certain Western traders (above all those evading bankruptcy) also put themselves in service of the pirates in the islands they frequented, buying their booty and providing them with equipment and supplies.

There were also very close links between Catholic piracy and the Catholic missions. The Capuchins of Paros protected Creveliers and had masses said for the repose of his soul. On numerous occasions, they also received generous alms from Corsican pirates like Angelo Maria Vitali or Giovanni Demarchi, who gave them 3,000 piastres to build their church. There seems to have been a sort of symbiosis between pirates and Catholic missionaries. The former protected the missions from the exactions of the Turks and the progress of the Orthodox Church. The monks supplied provisions and sometimes sanctuary. The presence of these privateer-pirates in the Cyclades at the end of the 17th century thus owed nothing to chance and formed part of a wider movement to try and return Westerners to the Archipelago.

At the beginning of the 18th century, the face of piracy in the Cyclades changed. The final loss by Venice of Crete diminished the Republic's interest in the region and thus its interventions. Louis XIV also changed his attitude. Western corsairs disappeared little by little and were replaced by natives who took part as much in piracy as in contraband or trade. Then the shipowners’ great fortunes slowly came into being.

=== Decline of the Ottoman Empire ===
Life under Ottoman domination had become difficult. With time, the advantages of Ottoman rather than Latin suzerainty vanished. When the old masters had been forgotten, the shortcomings of the new became ever clearer. The ahdname of 1580 granted administrative and fiscal liberties, as well as wide-ranging religious freedom: Greek Orthodox could build and repair their churches and above all, they had the right to ring the bells of their churches, a privilege not enjoyed by other Greek lands under Ottoman rule. The ideas of the Enlightenment also touched the Cyclades, brought by the traders who entered into contact with Western ideas during their voyages. At times, some of them sent their sons to study in Western universities. Moreover, a number of popular legends regarding the liberation of the Greeks and the reconquest of Constantinople circulated during the 17th and 18th centuries.

These stories told of God, his warrior saints and the last Emperor, Constantine XI Palaiologos, who would awaken and leave the cave where angels had carried him and transformed him into marble. These heavenly powers would lead Greek soldiers to Constantinople. In this battle, they would also be accompanied by a xanthos genos, a blond race of liberators come from the North. It was for this reason that the Greeks turned to the Russians, the only Orthodox not to have been conquered by the Turks, to help them recover their freedom.

Russia, which was seeking a warm-water port, regularly confronted the Ottoman Empire in its attempt to access the Black Sea and through it the Mediterranean; it knew how to put these Greek legends to good use. Thus, Catherine had named her grandson, due to succeed her, Constantine.

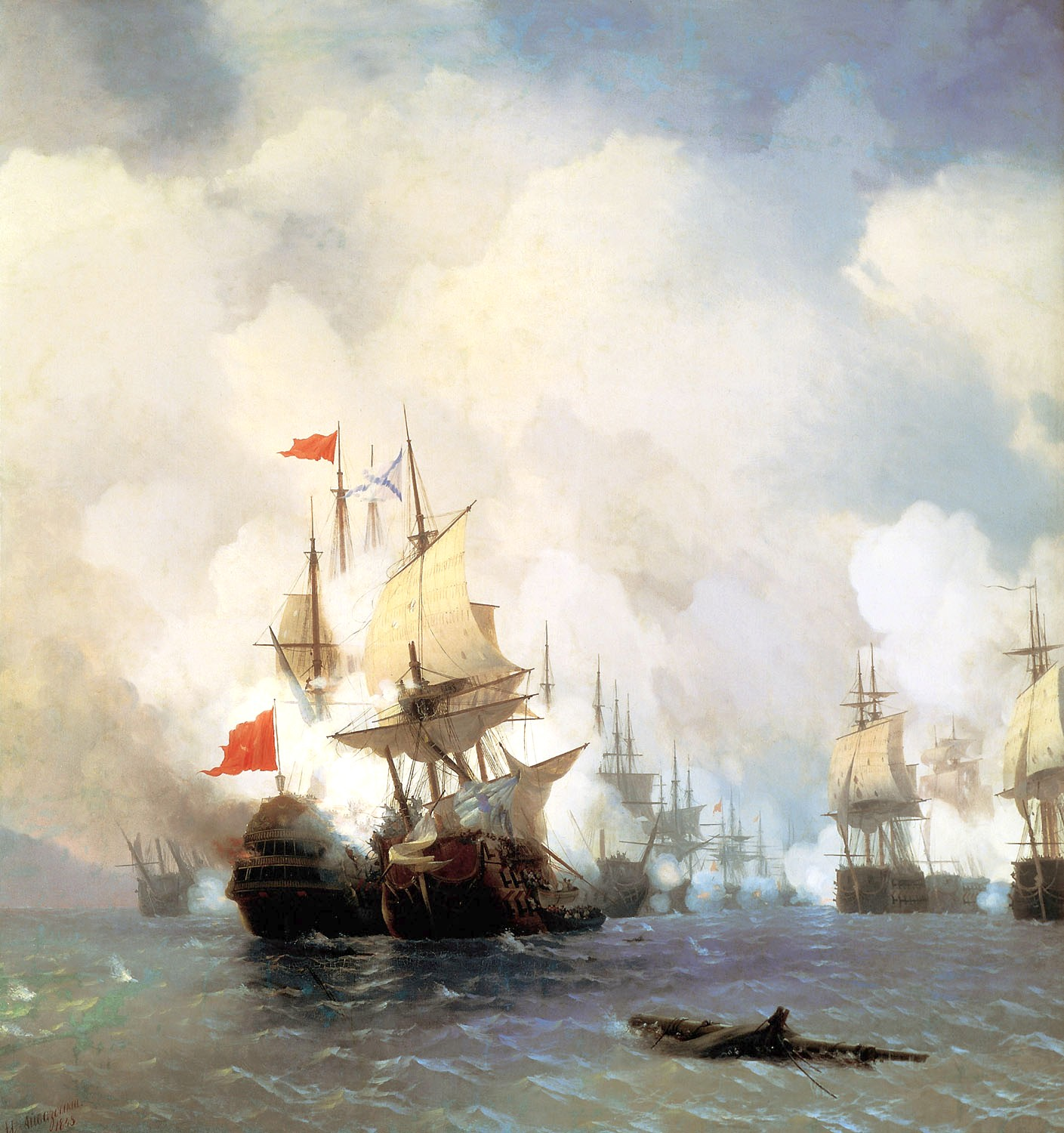
The Battle of Chesma.

The Cyclades took part in various important uprisings, such as that of 1770-74 during the Orlov Revolt, which brought about a brief passage of Catherine II's Russians through the islands. The operations took place primarily in the Peloponnese, and fighters native to the Cyclades left their islands in order to join the battle. In 1770, the Russian navy pursued the Ottoman navy across the Aegean and defeated it at Chesma. It then went on to spend the winter in the bay of Naoussa, in the northern part of Paros. However, hit by an epidemic, it abandoned its allies and evacuated mainland Greece in 1771. Nevertheless, it seems the Russians remained in the Cyclades at some length: “in 1774, [the Russians] took over the islands of the Archipelago, which they occupied in part for four or five years”; Mykonos would remain under Russian occupation from 1770 to 1774; and Russian ships would stay at Naoussa until 1777.

A new Russo-Turkish war (1787-1792) that ended in the Treaty of Jassy once again saw operations in the Cyclades. Lambros Katsonis, a Greek officer in the Russian navy, operated with a Greco-Russian flotilla from the island of Kea, whence he attacked Ottoman ships. A Turkish-Algerian fleet finished by defeating him off Andros on 18 May 1790 (OS). Katsonis managed to flee with just two ships toward Milos. He had lost 565 men; the Turks, over 3,000.

However, not all was lost for the Greeks, for the Treaty of Küçük Kaynarca (1774) allowed the islands to develop their commerce under Russian protection. Moreover, the islands were relatively unaffected by the Ottomans’ retributive exactions.

== The Cyclades in 19th- and 20th-century Greece ==
=== The Cyclades during the war of independence ===
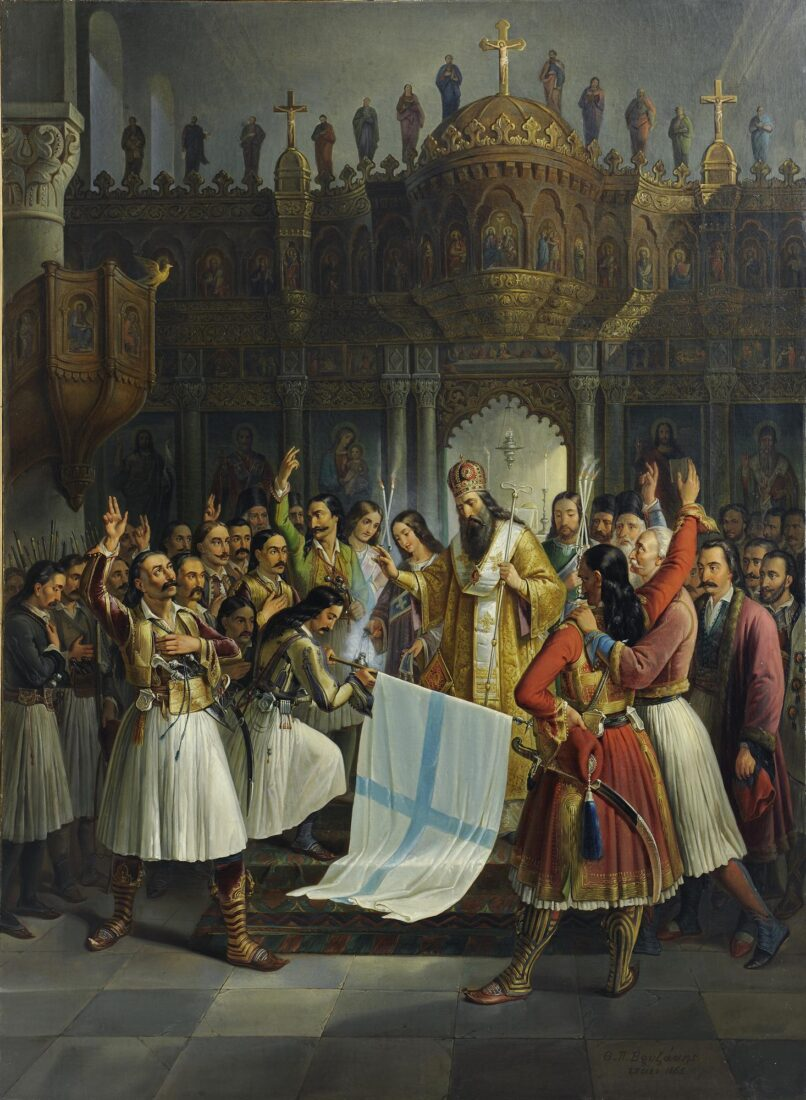
Germanos blesses the Greek flag.

The Treaty of Küçük Kaynarca of 1774 ensured the general prosperity of the Greek islands, well beyond those like Hydra or Spetses associated with famous shipowners. Andros took advantage of this situation by putting in place its own merchant fleet. This prosperity had two contradictory consequences also linked to the administrative absenteeism of the Ottomans in the Cyclades. On the one hand, the Turkish “government” no longer seemed so unbearable. On the other hand, to share the fruits of this prosperity with the Turk, rather than keep everything for oneself in an independent state, was becoming less and less acceptable.

For the archipelago's Catholics, the situation was fairly similar. At the beginning of the War of Independence, the Cyclades had around 16,000 Catholics (especially on Naxos, Syros, Tinos and Santorini). The distant Ottoman domination was not unbearable, but the Ottomans were considered the enemies of Christianity in general. If revolution failed, the Turkish reprisals would be cruel, like after the passage of the Russians in the 1770s. However, if the revolution succeeded, the prospect of living in a fundamentally Orthodox state did not please the Catholic islanders. Moreover, on the islands “liberated” from the Ottoman Empire, the Greek commissioners put into place compelled the Catholics to pay them the imposts that until then had gone to the Turks. The Catholics did not participate in the conflict, especially after the Pope declared his neutrality; this the Austria of Metternich compelled him to maintain despite the diplomatic mission of Germanos.

The national insurrection was launched in March 1821 with the mythical appeal of Germanos, Metropolitan of Patras. Kapetanoi (commanders, war chiefs) spread the revolt across Greece, principally in the Peloponnese and in Epirus.

This ambivalence explains the differences in attitude in the Archipelago at the moment of the War of Independence. This situation was aggravated by the consequences of the war: a renewal piracy under a patriotic pretext, a “revolutionary tax” demanded by the war chiefs, the disappearance of local institutions, the settling of old scores by those who took advantage of the anarchy to bring about social (poor against rich) or religious (Greek against Latin) upheaval. The French flag flew above the Catholic churches of Naxos throughout the conflict; this protected them from the resentment of the Orthodox, who called the Catholics “Turk-lovers”.

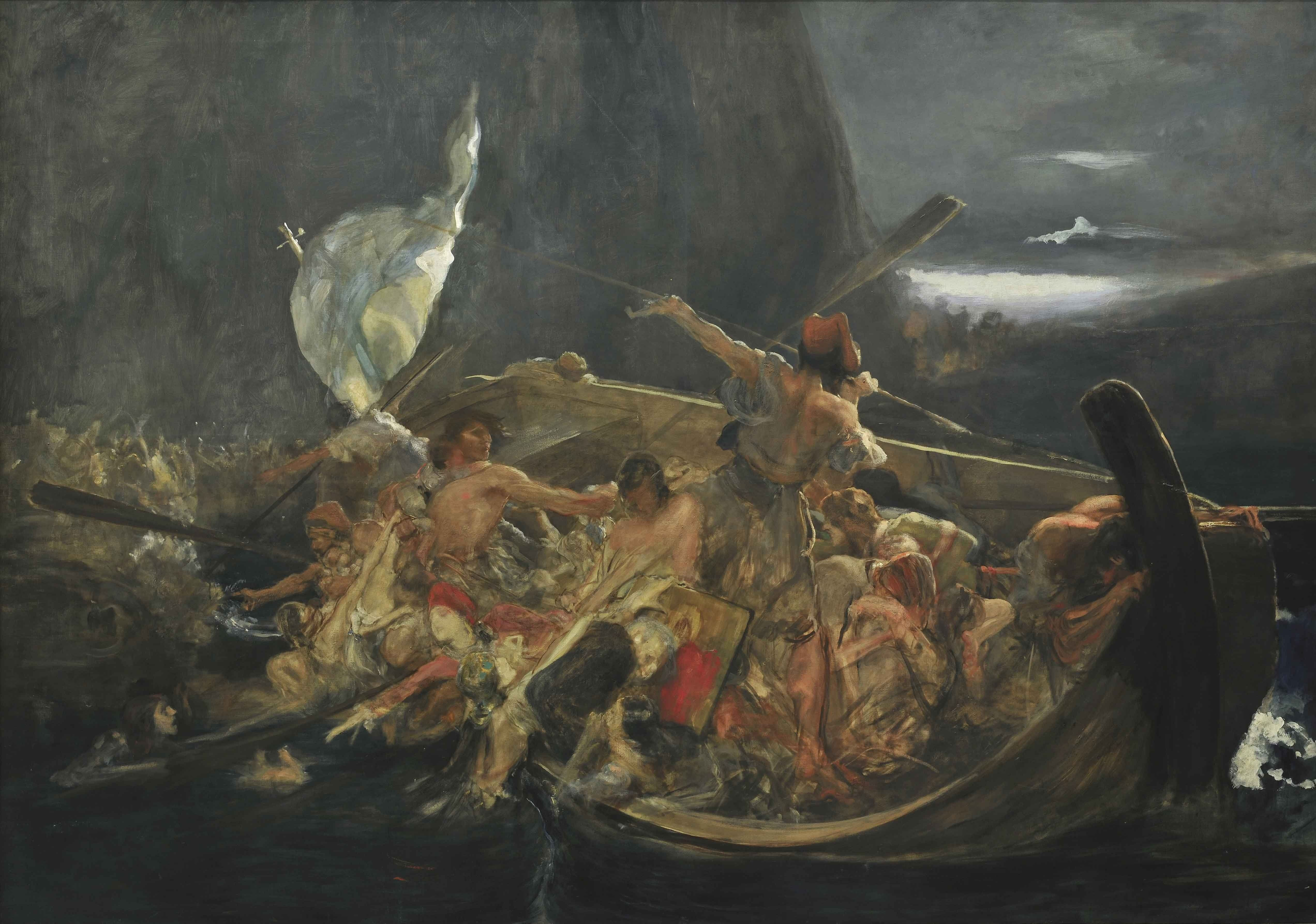
Nikolaos Gyzis, After the Capture of Psara. The painting evokes the survivors' flight, to the Cyclades for some.

Hence, the Cyclades took part in the conflict only sporadically. Like Hydra or Spetses, Andros, Tinos and Anafi placed their fleets in the service of the national cause. Mado Mavrogenis, the daughter of a Phanariote, used her fortune to supply “admiral” Emmanuel Tombazis with 22 ships and 132 cannons from Mykonos. The Orthodox Greeks of Naxos put together a troop of eight hundred men that fought the Ottomans. Paros sent a contingent to the Peloponnese that distinguished itself during the Siege of Tripolitsa led by Theodoros Kolokotronis.

The vicissitudes of conflict on the continent had their repercussions in the Cyclades. The massacres of Chios and Psara (committed in July 1824 by the troops of Ibrahim Pasha) led to an influx of people into the Cyclades, the survivors in effect becoming refugees there. In 1825, when Ibrahim Pasha landed in the Peloponnese with his Egyptian troops, a great number of refugees flooded onto Syros. The ethno-religious composition of the island and its urban structure were totally transformed as a result. The Catholic island became ever more Orthodox. The Greeks using the Greek rite moved onto the coast in what would later become the very busy port of Ermoupoli, while the Latin-rite Greeks remained on the heights of the medieval city.

From the beginning of the insurrection, Milos was occupied by the Russians and the French, who wished to observe what was happening in the Peloponnese.

At the end of the War of Independence, the Cyclades were given to the young Greek kingdom of Otto in 1832. However, their allocation to Greece was not automatic. The Ottoman Empire had no particular wish to keep them (they had never brought it much), but France showed great interest in their acquisition in the name of protecting Catholics.

=== Economy and society ===
==== Fluctuating prosperity in the 19th century ====
The marble quarries of Paros, abandoned for several centuries, were put back into service in 1844 for a very specific order: that of Napoleon’s tomb at Les Invalides. Later, in 1878, a “Société des Marbres de Paros” was created.

Syros played a fundamental role in the trade, transport and economy of Greece in the latter half of the 19th century. The island had a certain number of advantages at the end of the War of Independence. It had been protected by the relative neutrality of the Cyclades and by the French, who had taken the Catholics of Syros under their wing (and thus the island as a whole). Moreover, it no longer had rivals: shipowners’ islands like Hydra and Spetses had been so deeply involved in the conflict that it ruined them. Ermoupolis was long Greece's largest port (Thessaloniki was still in the Ottoman Empire). It was also an important industrial centre. In 1872, the first steam engines began to appear in Greece; in the Piraeus and at Ermoupolis, gas-powered plants were also set up. At Ermoupolis, the first strike in Greece's social history broke out: 400 tannery and naval shipyard employees stopped working in 1879, demanding salary increases.

When the Corinth Canal was inaugurated in 1893, Syros, and the Cyclades in general, began to collapse. The advent of steamships rendered them even less indispensable as a maritime stopover. The railroad, vector of the industrial revolution, was essentially unable to reach them, which also proved fatal. A similar situation occurred with the triumph of the automobile and of road transportation in the 20th century.

The illness that decimated silkworms during the 19th century also dealt a very heavy blow to the economy of Andros neighboring Tinos.

Meanwhile, starting in this period, certain islands experienced an important rural exodus. The inhabitants of Anafi left in such great numbers for Athens during and after Otto's reign that the neighbourhood they built, in their traditional architecture, at the foot of the Acropolis still bears the name of Anafiotika.

==== Population movements ====
The shifting fortunes of the Megali Idea during the 19th century continued to change the islands’ ethnic and social composition. The failure of the Cretan insurrection of 1866-67 brought numerous refugees to Milos, who moved, like the Peloponnesians on Syros a few years earlier, onto the coast and there created, at the foot of the old medieval village of the Frank seigneurs, a new port, that of Adamas.

The censuses of 1889 and 1896 show the evolution in the Cyclades’ population. The total number of inhabitants rose 2.4%, from 131,500 to 134,750. This growth was the weakest in all of Greece (+11% on average, +21% for Attica). At the same time, the city of Ermoupolis lost 8,000 people (-27%), falling from over 30,000 to 22,000 dwellers. It was already suffering the effects of the Corinth Canal's opening and the development of the Piraeus.

In 1922, after the Greek defeat in Asia Minor and above all the capture, massacres and fire at Smyrna, the region's Greek population fled in makeshift crafts. A good part of them first found refuge in the Cyclades, before being directed toward Macedonia and Thrace. Thus the islands too felt, if in lesser measure, the impact of the “Great Catastrophe”.

The 1950s were a period of great change for Greece. The urban share of the population went from 37% to 56% between 1951 and 1961, with Athens absorbing 62% of the total urban growth. From 1956 to 1961, 220,000 people left the countryside for Athens while another 600,000 migrated abroad. Between 1951 and 1962, 417 Pariots left their island for Athens due to what they considered deplorable living conditions and in the hope of finding work in Athens.

==== 20th-century economic transformations (besides tourism) ====
In the mid-1930s, the Cyclades’ population density was between 40 and 50 inhabitants per km^{2}, on par with the national average of 47.

In an overview article on the Greek economy written in the mid-1930s, the author, an American economist, cited very little data about the Cyclades. For agriculture, he noted the wine production of Santorini, but said nothing concerning the fishing industry. His chapter devoted to industry cited basketry workshops on Santorini and for Syros, activity in basketry and tannery. However, the Cyclades did appear for their mineral resources. The emery of Naxos, mined consistently since prehistory, was exploited chiefly for export. Sifnos, Serifos, Kythnos and Milos provided iron ore. Santorini provided pozzolana (volcanic ash); Milos, sulphur; and Antiparos and Sifnos, zinc in the form of calamine. Syros remained one of the country's export-oriented ports.

Important bauxite deposits were found in the limestone layers of the islands’ substrata, chiefly on Amorgos, Naxos, Milos, Kimolos and Serifos. The resources of Amorgos were already being exploited in 1940. In 1946, Greek reserves were estimated at 60 million tons.

The exhaustion of iron ore on Kythnos was one of the causes of significant emigration starting in the 1950s.

Andros was one of the rare shipowners’ islands that managed to operate steam engines (for example, the source of the Goulandris’ fortune) and until the 1960s-1970s, it supplied the Hellenic Navy with numerous sailors.

To this day, a certain number of natural resources offer the Cyclades occupations other than tourism. On certain islands, agriculture is still an activity of paramount importance, indeed so developed that the island could do without the presence of tourists (this is the case for Naxos). The Cyclades produce but above all export wine (Andros, Tinos, Mykonos, Paros, Naxos, Sikinos and Santorini), figs (Syros, Andros, Tinos, Mykonos, Naxos and Sikinos), olive oil (Syros, Sifnos, Naxos and Ios), citrus fruits (Andros, Sifnos and Naxos), vegetables (Syros, Tinos, Sifnos, Ios and Santorini), among which is the famous Naxos potato. Sheep, goats and a few cows are raised (Sifnos, Paros and Naxos). Mineral resources are also present: marble (Paros, Tinos and Naxos) and marble dust for cement (Paros), emery (Naxos), manganese (Mykonos), and iron as well as bauxite (Serifos). Milos is dotted with huge open air mines producing sulphur, alum, barium, perlite, kaolin, bentonite and, as has been true throughout its history, obsidian. Syros still has naval shipyards, metallurgic industry and tanneries.

=== World War II: famine and guerrilla war ===
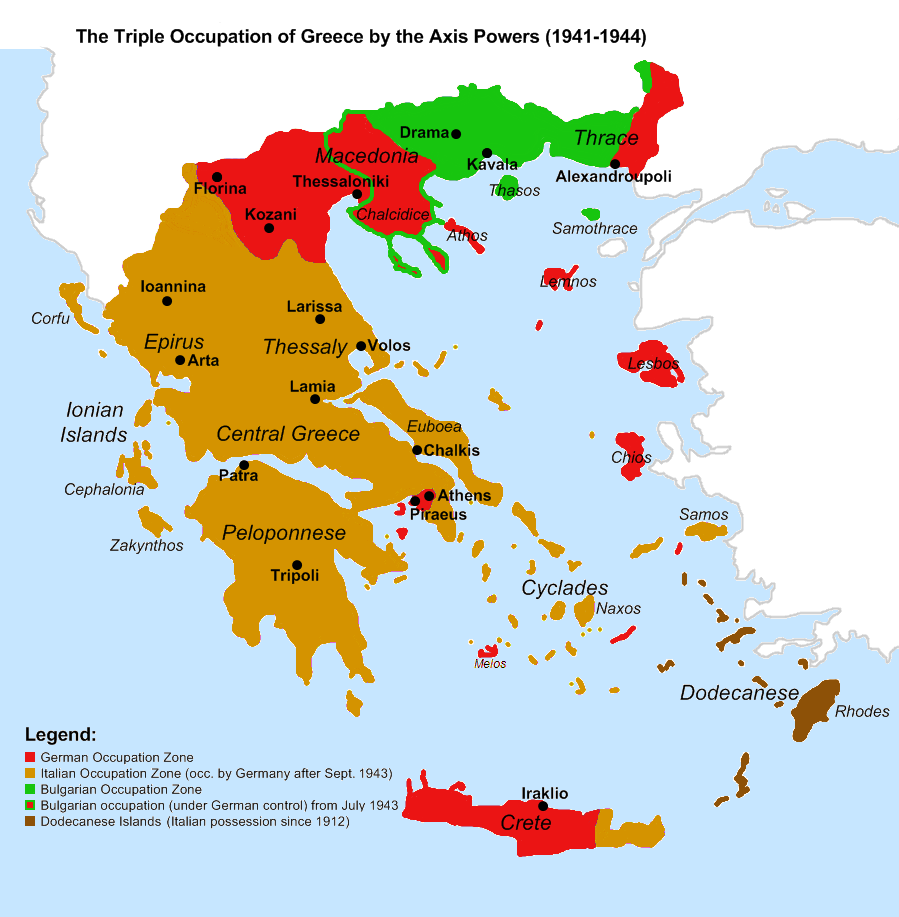
The Greek occupation zones: the Cyclades were under Italian control (until 1943) except Milos and Amorgos occupied by the Germans.

The Italian attack on Greece had been preceded by the torpedoing of the cruiser Elli, a symbolic ship for Greece, in the bay of Tinos on 15 August 1940. The Italians wanted to create an Italian "Provincia delle Cicladi" after the war's end. A process of "Italianization" was started in summer 1941, mainly in the catholic areas: it was partially successful in the city of Ano Syros.

The German attack of April 1941 led to a total defeat and the occupation of Greece from the end of that month. However, the Cyclades were occupied late and more by Italian than by German troops. The first occupation forces appeared on 9 May 1941: Syros, Andros, Tinos and Kythnos were occupied by Italians and Germans took Milos. This delay allowed the islands to serve as a stopover for politicians heading to Egypt to continue the struggle. George Papandreou and Konstantinos Karamanlis thus stopped on Tinos before meeting in Alexandria.

Following the Italian surrender, on 8 September 1943 the OKW ordered commanders of units in the Mediterranean sector to neutralize, by force if necessary, Italian units. On 1 October 1943, Hitler ordered his army to occupy all islands in the Aegean controlled by the Italians.

At the time, Churchill’s objective in the eastern Mediterranean was to take the Italian-occupied Dodecanese so as to pressure neutral Turkey and tip it over into the Allied camp. Thus, British troops took control of this archipelago little by little (see Dodecanese Campaign). The German counter-attack was spectacular. General Müller left continental Greece on 5 November 1943 and moved from island to island, occupying each, until he reached Leros on 12 November and fought off the British. Thus the Cyclades were, for the time being, under definitive German occupation.

Like the rest of the country, the Cyclades would suffer from the Great Famine organised by the German occupier. Moreover, on the islands, caïques no longer had authorization to go out and fish. Thus, on Tinos, it is considered that 327 persons in the town of Tinos and around 900 in the region of Panormos died of hunger during the conflict. Pre-war Naxos depended on Athens for a third of its supplies, transported by six caiques. During the war, as people were dying of hunger in the capital, the island could no longer depend on this contribution and four of its ships had been sunk by the Germans. On Syros, the number of deaths went from 435 in 1939 to 2,290 in 1942, and a birth deficit was also noticeable: 52 excess births in 1939, 964 excess births in 1942.

Resistance was organised on each island, but due to their isolation, the Resistance forces could not mount the kind of guerrilla warfare that occurred on the mainland. However, in spring 1944, the islands became a scene of fighting as the Greek Sacred Band special forces unit and British commandos raided the German garrisons. Thus, on 24 April 1944 the SBS raided Santorini; on 14 May 1944, the Sacred Band attacked the aerodrome built on Paros by the Germans and seized it as well as its commander; on 24 May 1944, the German garrison of Naxos was attacked, and again on 12 October, leading to the island's liberation on the 15th. In Mykonos a squad of 26 men attacked a munitions depot, killing six German soldiers and finally forcing the Germans to evacuate the island on 25 September 1944. Although nearly all of Greece was evacuated in September 1944, a few garrisons remained, such as that on Milos, which did not surrender to the island's sacred band until 7 May 1945.

==== A place of exile once again ====
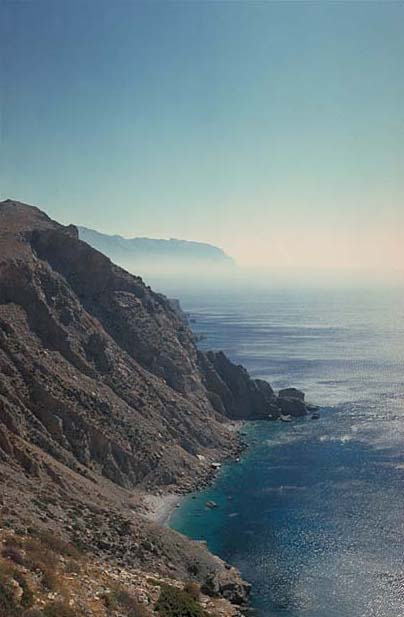
Amorgos, one of the places of exile.

During the various dictatorships of the 20th century, the Cyclades, first Gyaros and later Amorgos and Anafi, regained their former role as places of exile.

Starting in 1918, royalists were deported there in the context of the Ethnikos Dikhasmos (National Schism). In 1926, the dictatorial government of Pangalos exiled Communists to the islands.

During the Metaxas dictatorship (1936–1940), over 1,000 people (members of the KKE, syndicalists, socialists or opponents in general) were deported to the Cyclades. On certain islands, the deportees outnumbered the local population. They came chiefly from tobacco-producing regions in northern Greece and belonged to all manner of social classes: workers, teachers, doctors, etc. Exile on the islands was the simplest solution. It avoided overcrowding prisons on the mainland and their presence on the islands allowed easier control over the prisoners: communication with the outside world was in essence limited. In contrast with the prisons, where detainees were housed and fed, deportees on the islands had to procure shelter, food, eating utensils, etc. for themselves, making it cheaper for the government. Certain of the Cyclades were partly depopulated by the rural exodus since the mid-19th century, so empty houses were at the disposal of the deportees, who had to rent them. Poor exiles received a daily allowance of 10 drachmai (a quarter of an agricultural labourer's salary) for food and lodging; exiles deemed “prosperous” received nothing.

The exiles had to put in place a form of social organisation in order to survive. This organisation was perfectly in place when the Italians or the Germans took the Greek police's place during World War II. Thus they had the possibility of applying in practice the principles that they were defending politically. “Communes” were put into place, headed by an “executive committee” including, among others, a treasurer, a thrift officer and a secretary tasked with organising debates and study groups. The communes had very strict regulations regarding relations between commune members and islanders, with whom they had continual contact for rent payment (on houses, then during the war on land where the exiles cultivated or let their flocks pasture) or food purchase. Work was done in common. The various household chores were divided and performed by each one in turn. The communes forbade their members, the great majority of them men, any sexual relations with the women of the islands, so as to maintain good understanding and perhaps thereby win over the islanders to the deportees’ political ideas. Likewise, exiled doctors not only attended to members of their commune, but also to the natives. The main effect that the exiles’ presence had on the local population was to reveal to the islanders how various governments thought of their island: as a deserted, inhospitable place where no one lived willingly. Some islanders joked that they could have whatever political opinions they wished, for the government had no other place to deport them.

In 1968, 5,400 opponents of the junta were deported to Gyaros, facing Andros.

The refusal of governments in the 1950s and ‘60s to improve port and road infrastructure on certain small islands of the Cyclades was interpreted by the inhabitants as a wish on the part of the state to preserve places of exile still sufficiently cut off from the world, which did not endear Athens to the islanders. Thus, Amorgos was only electrified in the 1980s and the road linking the two principal villages was not paved until 1991. This situation hindered the Cyclades’ tourist development.

==== 19th- and 20th-century tourist development ====
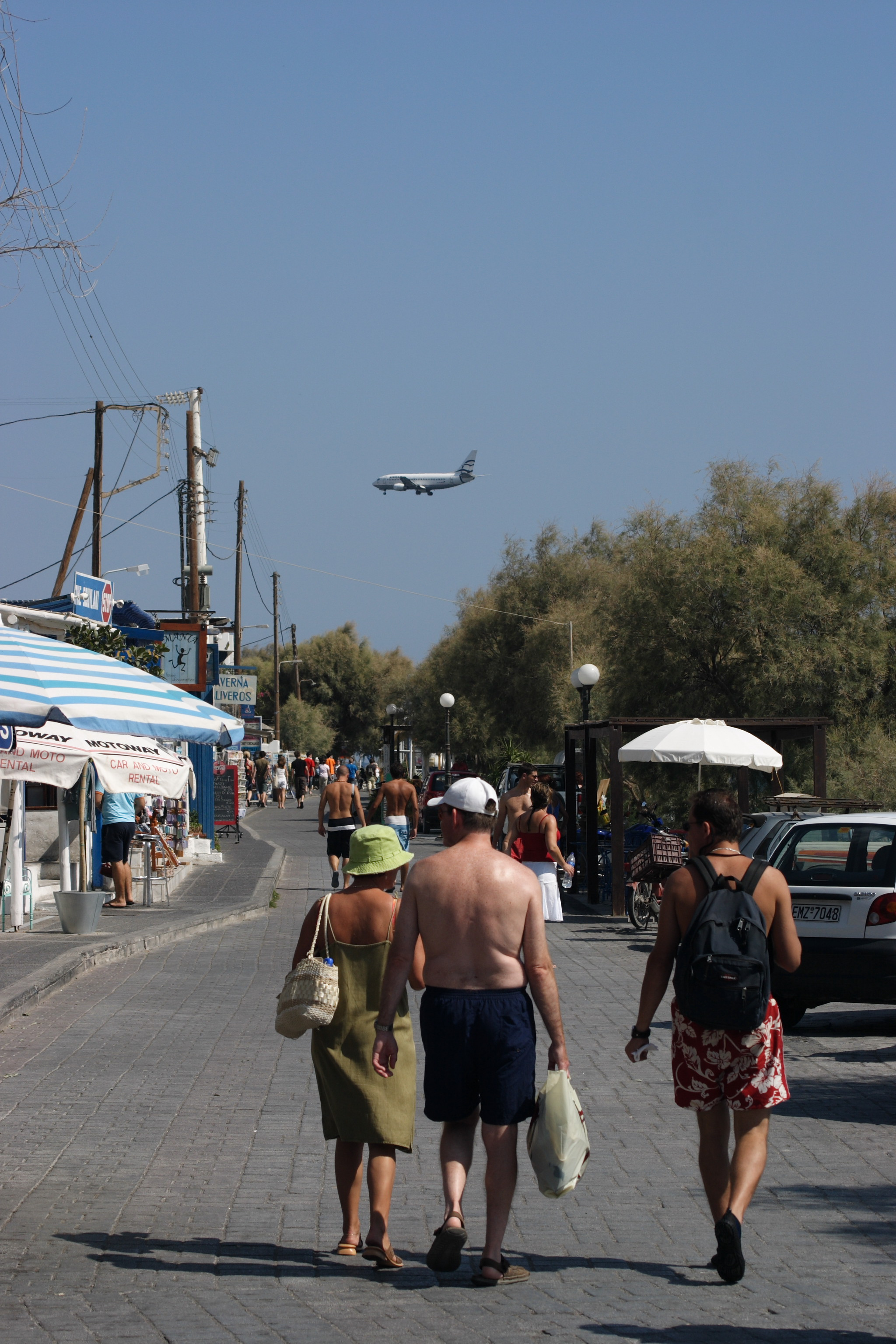
Tourists, boutiques and an airplane near a beach on Santorini.

Greece has been a tourist destination for a very long time. It was already part of the itinerary of the first tourists, the inventors of the word: the British of the Grand Tour.

At the start of the 20th century, the main tourist interest in the Cyclades was Delos, the ancient importance of which had nourished the “tourists’” studies. The Baedeker Guide mentioned only Syros, Mykonos and Delos. Syros was the main port that all ships touched; Mykonos was the obligatory stopover before the visit to Delos. Syros featured two hotels worthy of their name (Hôtel de la ville and Hôtel d'Angleterre). On Mykonos, one had to content oneself with Konsolina “house” or rely on the Epistates (police official) of the Antiquities, in which case the competition between potential visitors to Delos must have been rough. The Guide Joanne of 1911 also insisted on Delos (treating it in 12 of 22 pages devoted to the Cyclades), but all the other important islands were mentioned, if only in a single paragraph. Meanwhile, tourist development was already noticeable on these other islands: Mykonos had a hotel at the time (Kalymnios) and two boarding houses; other than that of Mme Konsolina (which was well established), there was also that of Mme Malamatenia.

In 1933, Mykonos received 2,150 holiday-goers and 200 foreigners visited Delos and the museum on Mykonos.

Mass tourism to Greece only really took off starting in the 1950s. After 1957, the revenue it generated grew 20% a year. They soon rivalled the revenue obtained from the chief raw material for export, tobacco, and then surpassed it.

Today, tourism in the Cyclades is a contrasting phenomenon. Certain islands, like Naxos with its important agricultural and mining resources, or Syros, which still plays a commercial and administrative role, do not depend solely on tourism for their survival. This is less true for small, infertile rocks like Anafi or Donoussa, which numbers (2001) 120 inhabitants and six pupils in its primary school but 120 rooms for rent, two travel agencies and a bakery open only during summer.

In 2005, there were 909 hotels in the Cyclades, with 21,000 rooms and 40,000 places. The main tourist destinations are Santorini (240 hotels, of which 6 have five stars) and Mykonos (160 hotels, with 8 five-star ones), followed by Paros (145 hotels, just one being five-star) and Naxos (105 hotels). All other islands offer less than 50 hotels. At the other extreme, Schoinoussa and Sikinos each have only one two-star hotel. The chief type of lodging in the Cyclades is the two-star hotel (404 establishments). In 1997, the tourist load was measured: the Cyclades had 32 beds per km^{2}, or 0.75 beds per inhabitant. On Mykonos, Paros, Ios and Santorini (from north to south), the tourist load is strongest, not only for the Cyclades, but for all the Aegean islands, with over 1.5 beds per inhabitant. However, at the archipelago level, the tourist load is heavier in the Dodecanese. This is due to the fact that the islands of the Cyclades are smaller and less populated than the other islands, so the load on an individual island is stronger than for the archipelago as a whole.

In the 2006 season, the Cyclades received 310,000 visitors of 11.3 million coming to Greece as a whole; the Cyclades had 1.1 million overnight stays while the country had 49.2 million—an occupancy rate of 61%, equivalent to the national average. The figure of 1.1 million overnight stays has remained stable for several years (as of 2007), while the number of tourists visiting Greece has fallen: the Cyclades still attract the same numbers while Greece has brought in fewer.

A tendency beginning in the 2000s (decade) is for foreign tourism to be replaced little by little with domestic Greek tourism. In 2006, 60% of tourists to Santorini were of Greek origin, and they did not differ fundamentally from foreign tourists (average stay: 6.5 nights for a Greek and 6.1 nights for a foreigner; average spending for a Greek: 725 € and 770 € for a foreigner). The only differences are that the Greeks prepare their stay later (20 days before) than the foreigners (45 days before) and return (by 2007, 50% of Greeks had made more than two trips, as against 20% of foreign tourists).

== Image gallery ==
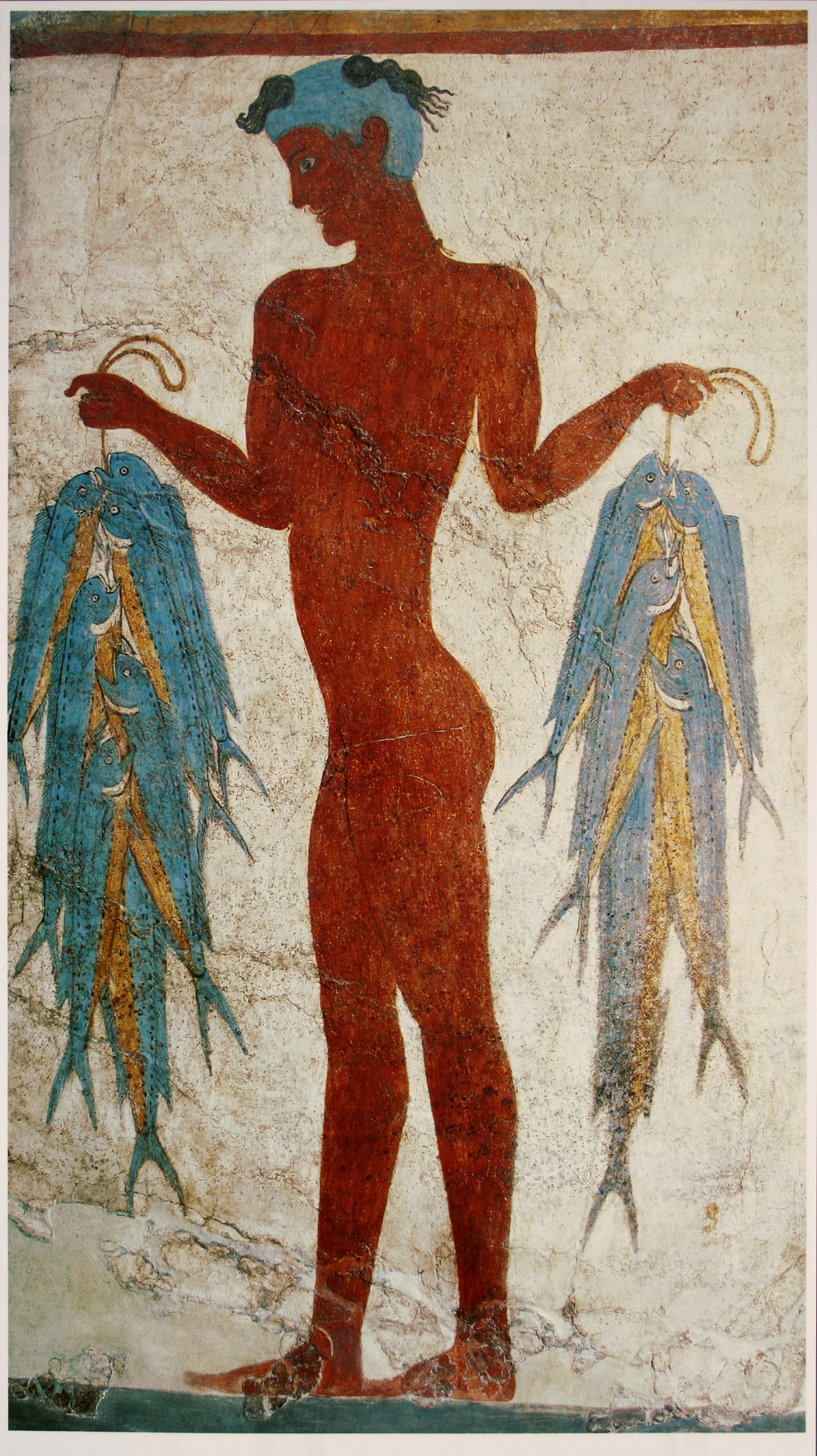
Akrotiri, Santorini, the Fisherman.

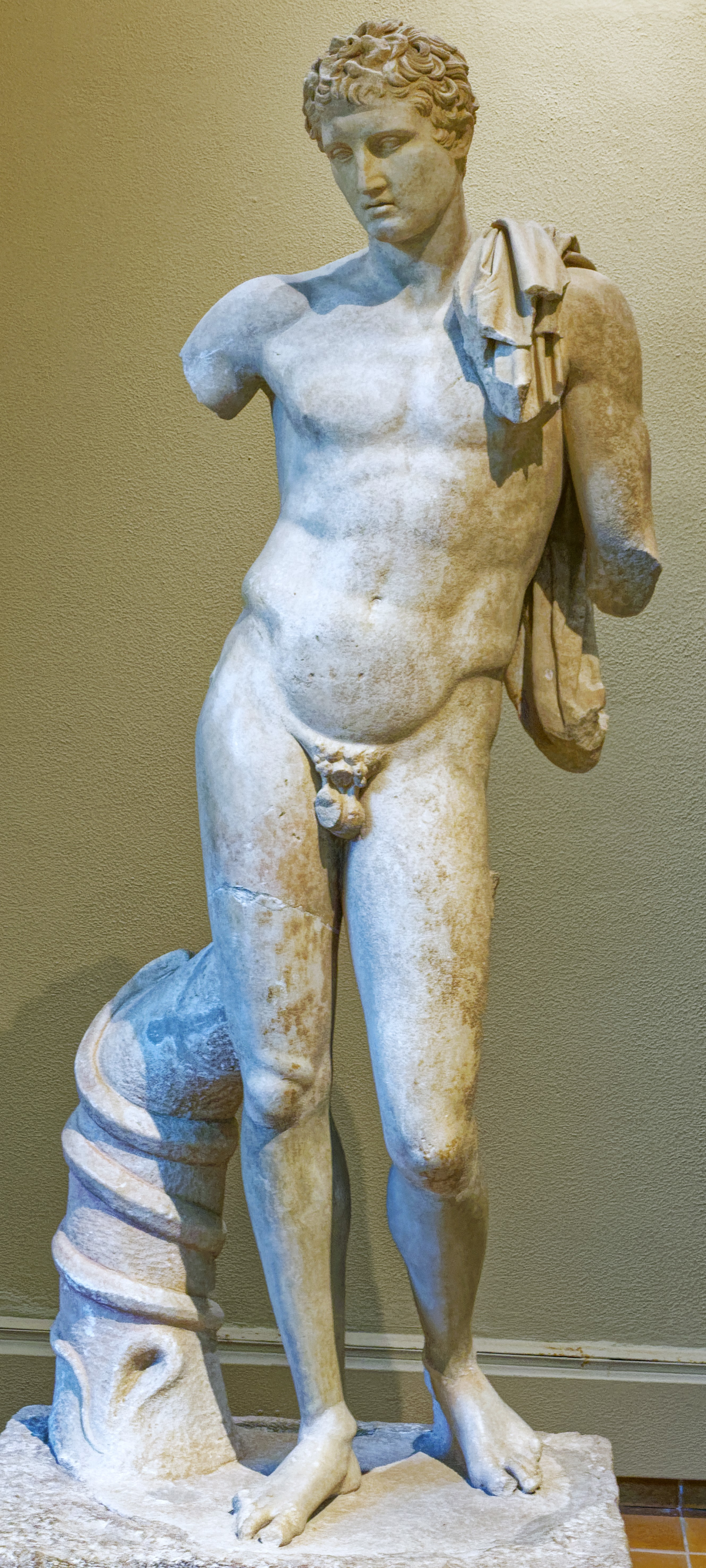
Hermes of Andros, Farnese type of Hermes.

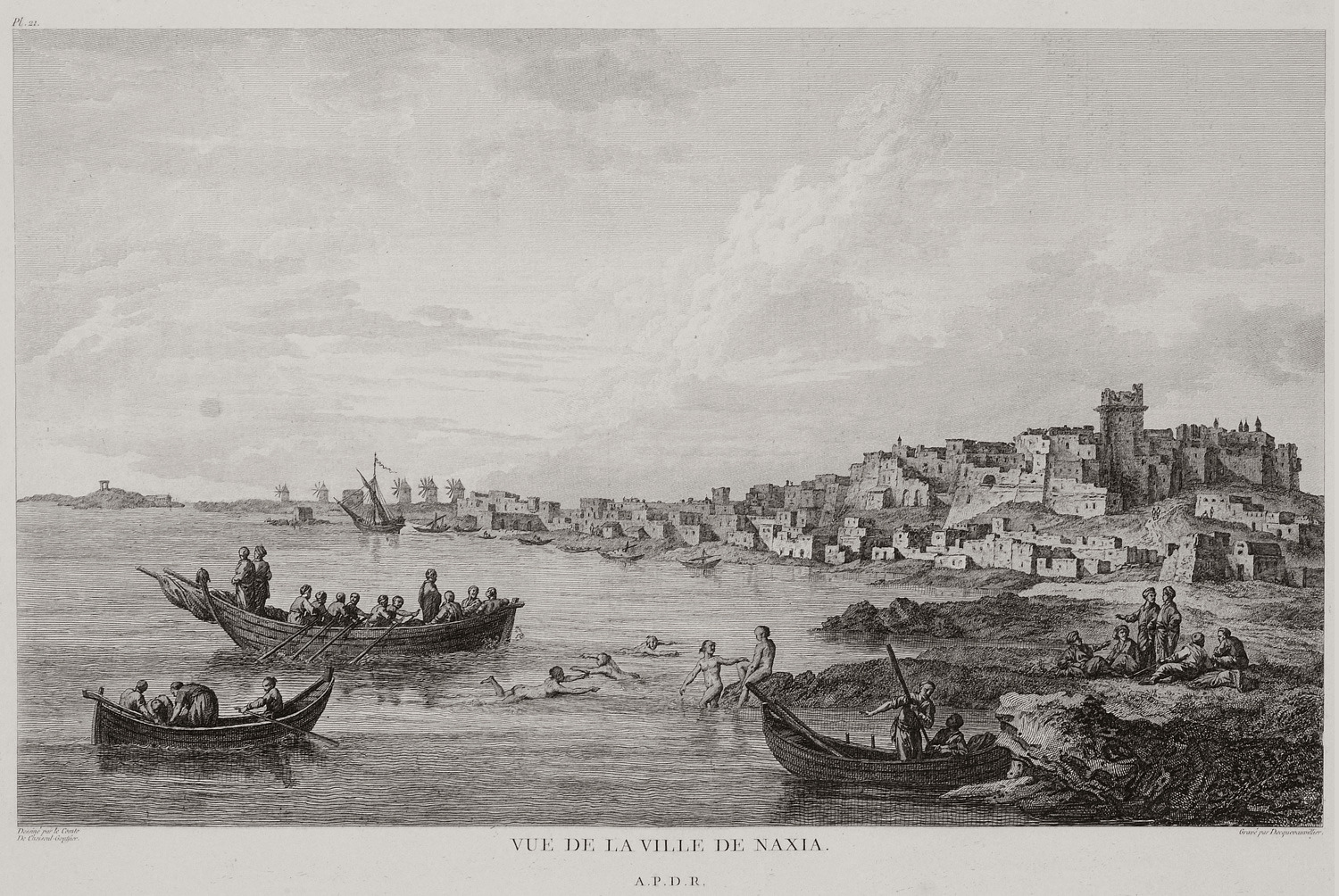
Naxos in the 18th century, drawn for Voyage pittoresque de la Grèce by Choiseul-Gouffier

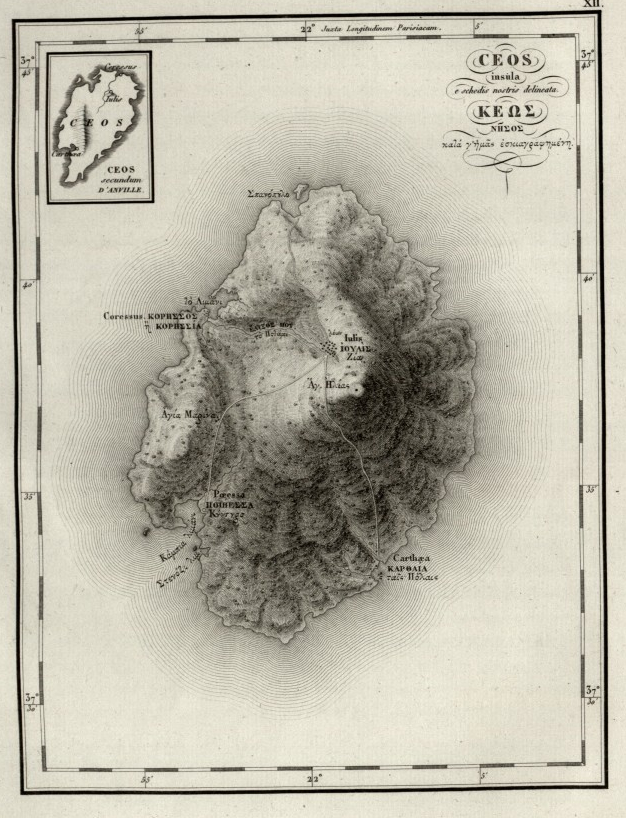
Map of Kea in 1826.

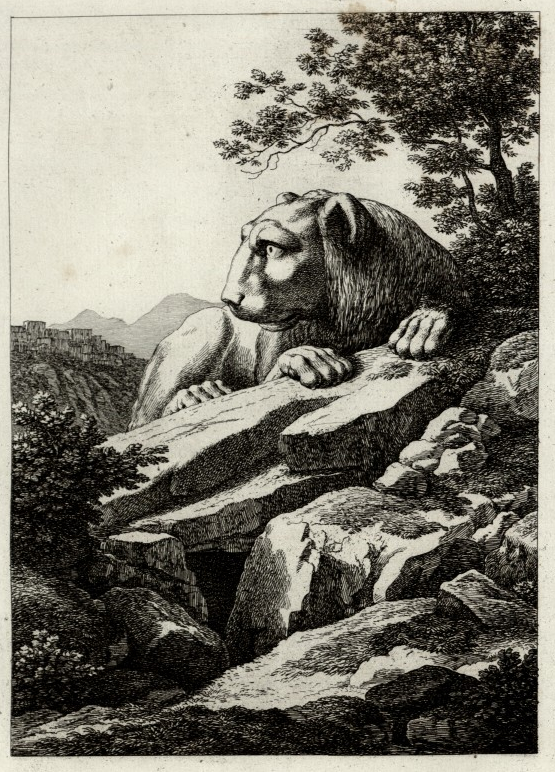
The Lion of Kea (1826).

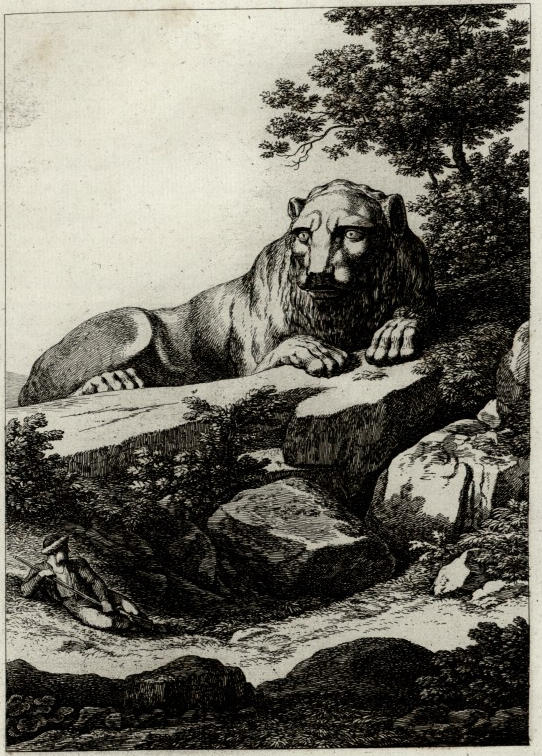
The Lion of Kea (1826) at another angle.

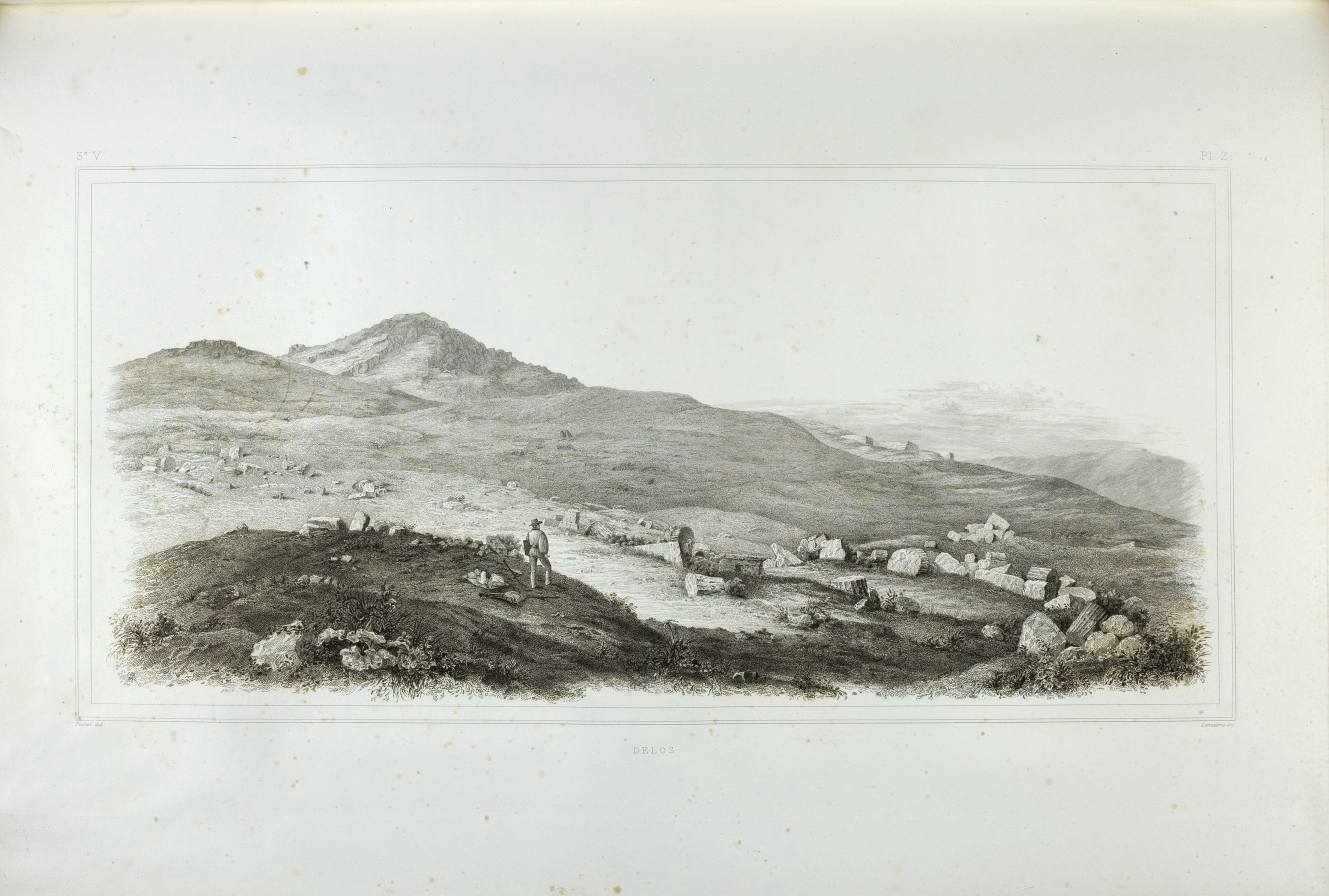
Delos in 1829 (A. Blouet, Morea expedition).

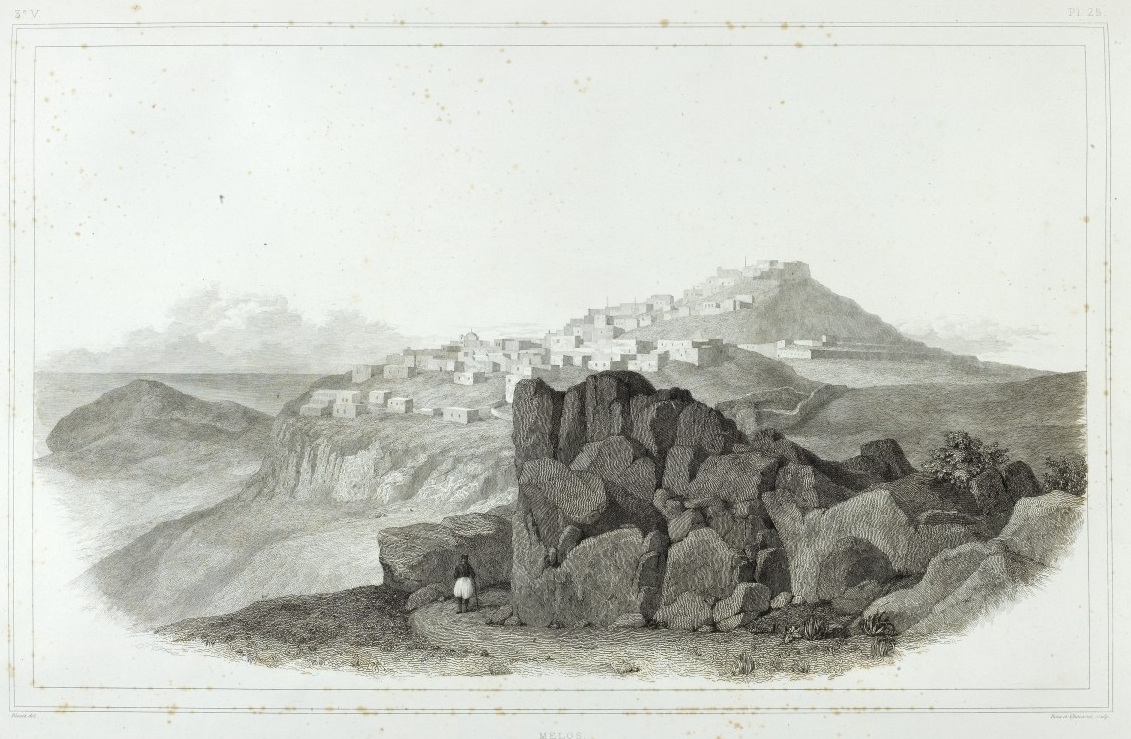
Milos in 1829 (A. Blouet, Morea expedition).

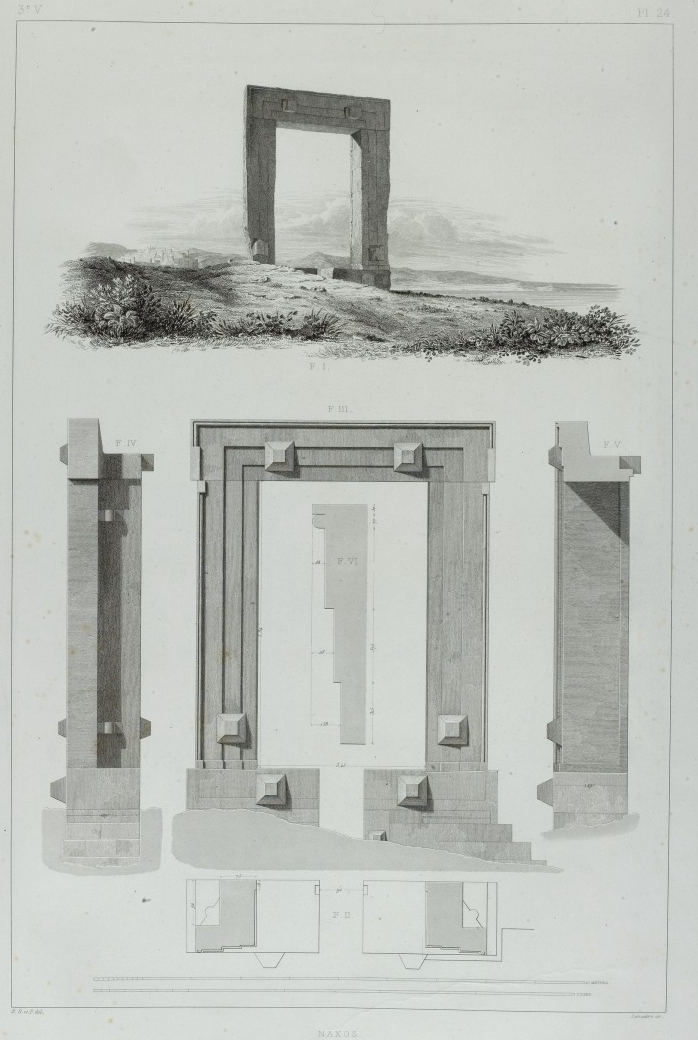
Portara on Naxos in 1829 (Abel Blouet, Morea expedition).

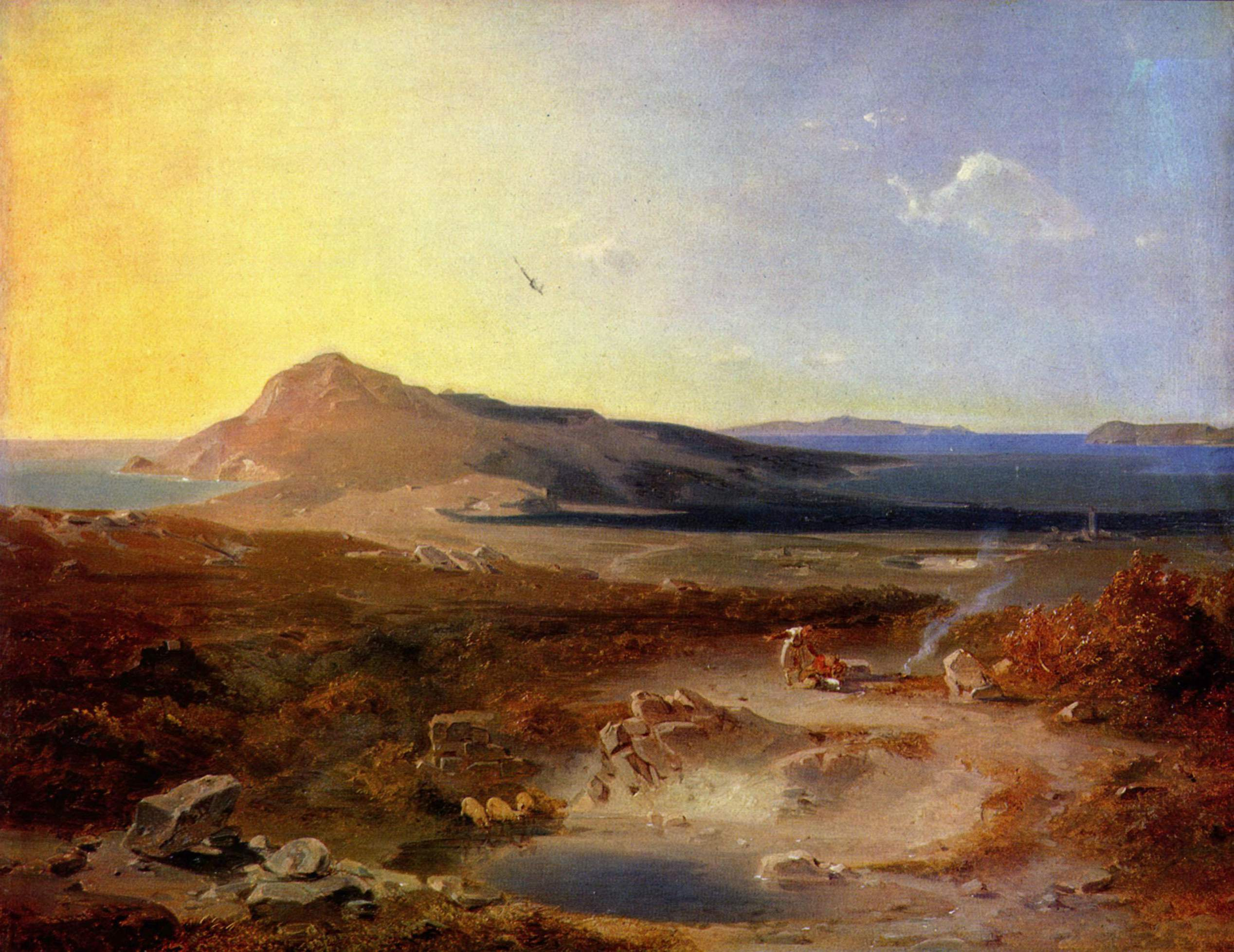
Delos in 1847 (Carl Anton Joseph Rottmann)

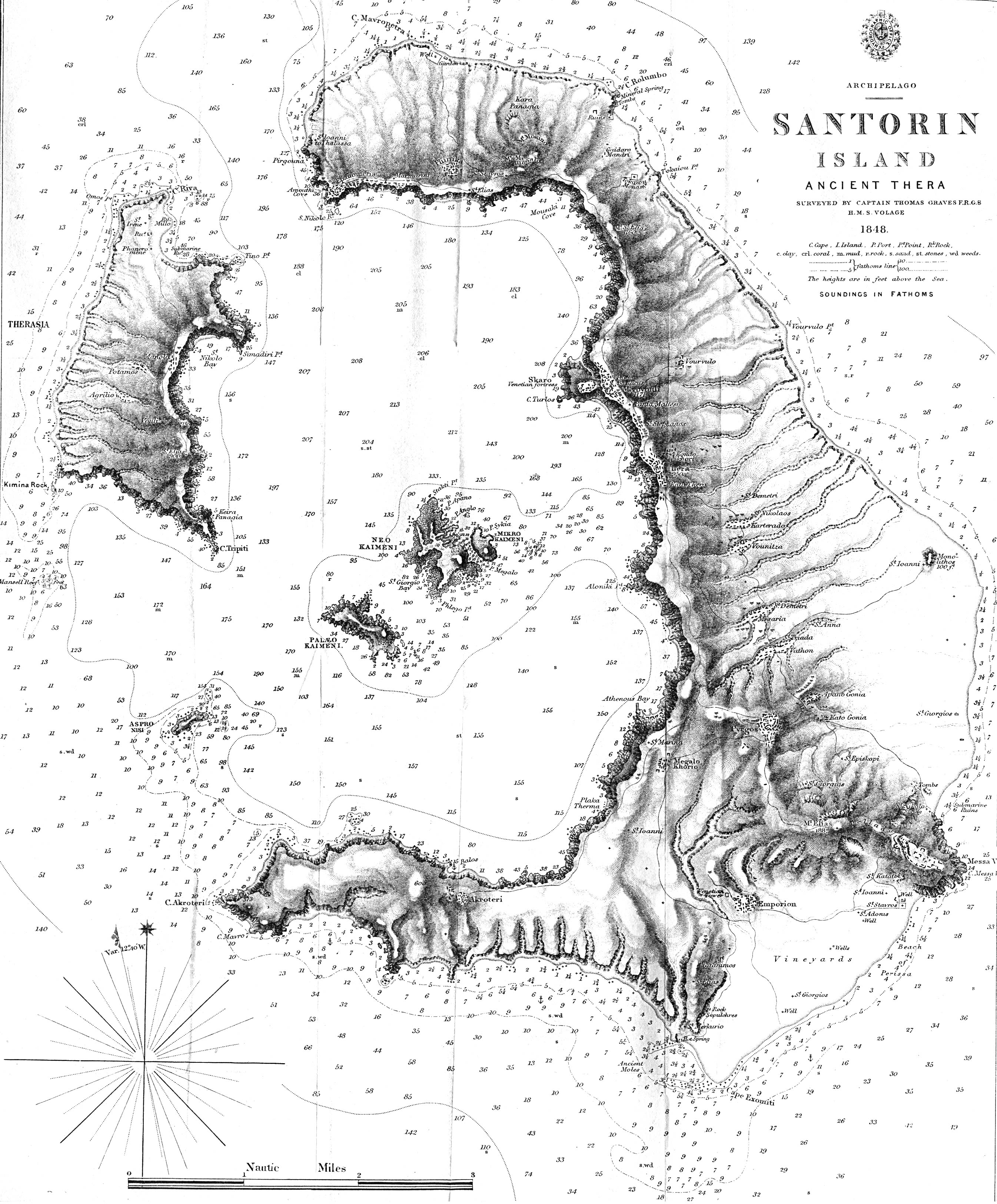
Map of Santorini in 1848.

== See also ==
- Cyclades
- Cycladic civilization
- Duchy of the Archipelago
- Mosaics of Delos
