= Fat Lady of Saliagos =

Aegean Neolithic marble sculpture

The Fat Lady of Saliagos (also known as The Naked Lady of Saliagos) is a marble figure from the Aegean Neolithic period from Saliagos between Paros and Antiparos.

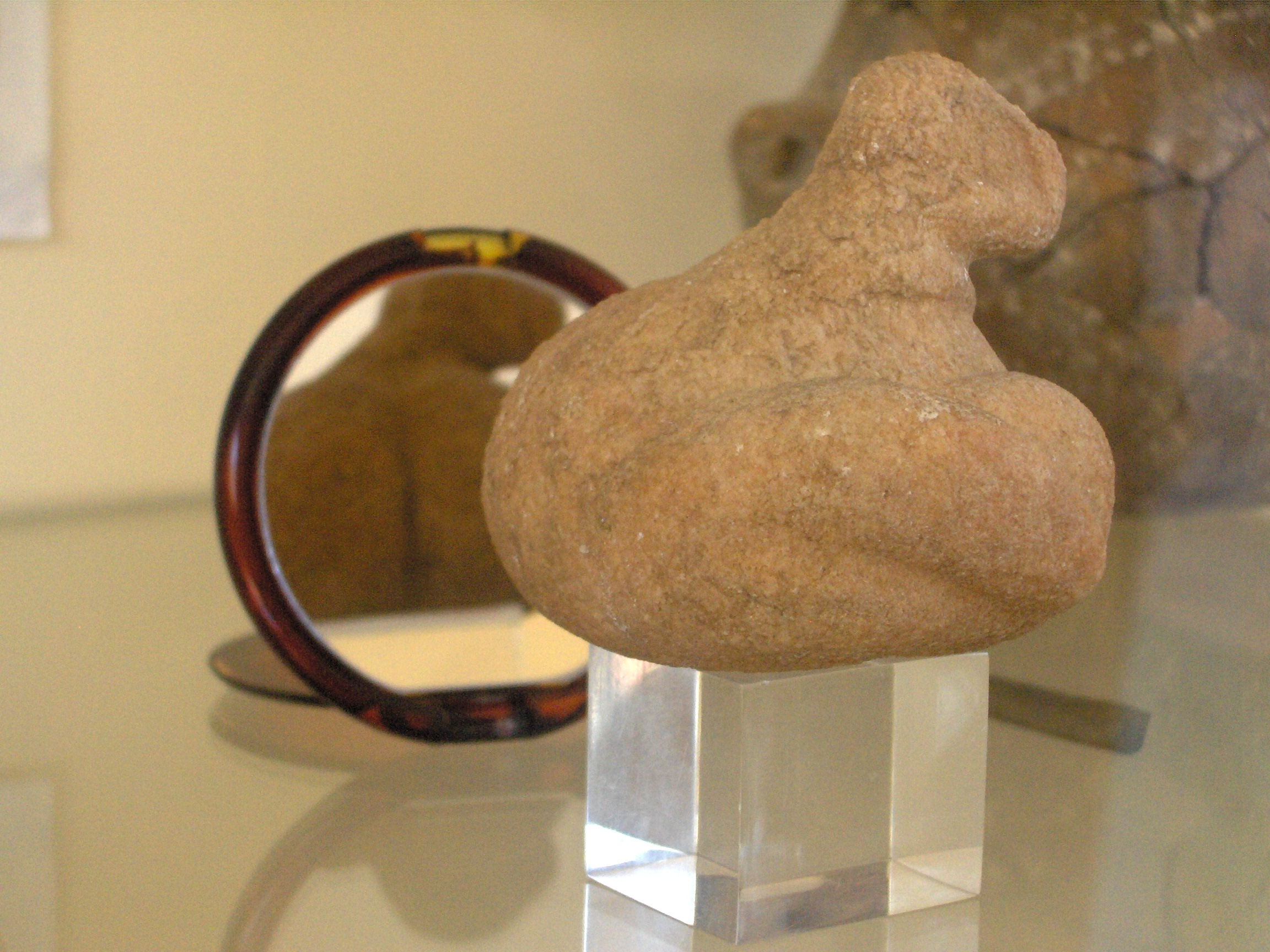
The fat lady of Saliagos.

The figure dates from about 5000 to 4000BCE and is the oldest known Cycladean statue. The figure is missing its head and left shoulder.

It was found during the excavations of Saliagos in 1964/65 by John Davies Evans and Colin Renfrew.

The Fat Lady currently resides in the Archaeological Museum of Paros.
