= Kephala, Kea =

Neolithic settlement in Kea, Greece

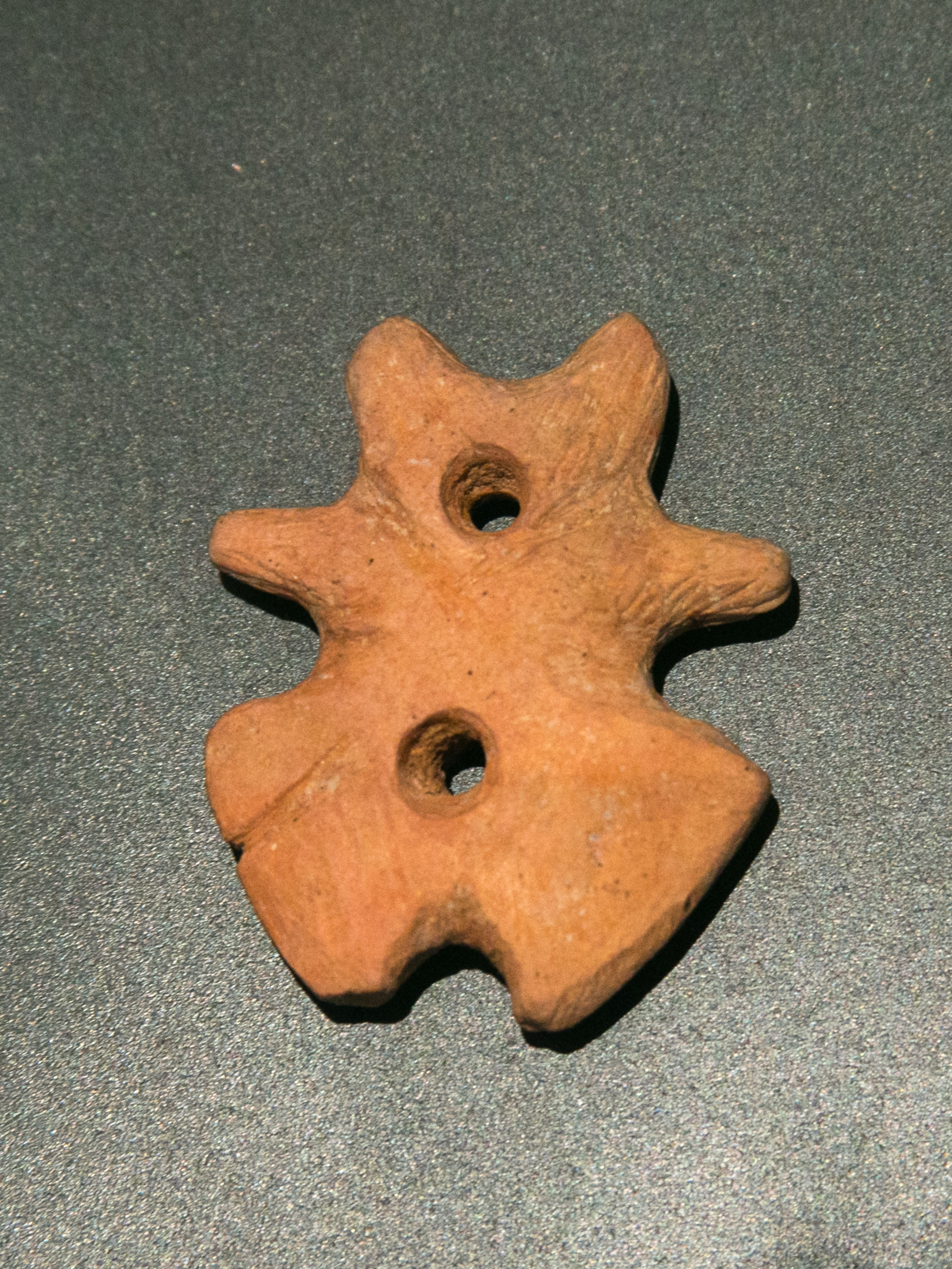
Anthropomorphic stone pendant figurine from the same era as Kephala. From the islet of Saliagos near Paros, Late Neolithic, 5300-4500 BC.

Kephala, Kea is a Late/Final Neolithic settlement on the Greek island of Kea. It is located on a rocky promontory, in the northern part of Kea. The Final Neolithic of the Cyclades is fully represented here. It is the only significant open settlement of this period. This means a settlement with free-standing structures that is not protected by a wall.

Some sites in Attica, such as Athens and Thorikos, and in Aegina seem to be related to Kephala. The Final Neolithic Period in southern Greece is known as Attica-Kephala culture.

== Excavations ==
The site was excavated between 1964 and 1973 by a team from the University of Cincinnati.

Only a few foundation walls have survived from the settlement. The buildings consisted of one or more small rectangular rooms. All buildings were made of the island's limestone. Grave goods were rare and consisted of a simple vessel or some small stone tools.

== Dating ==
Kephala has been recently dated to about 4600-4500 BC, but the Attica-Kephala culture may have continued later even in the 4th millennium BC, such as up to 3500 BC.

The Neolithic community of Kephala may have consisted of 45-80 people. They farmed cereals, and kept sheep, goats, cattle and pigs. But fishing was also important.

Pottery was covered with a red slip and decorated by burnishing. Pottery shards come from bowls and jars made from the clay of the island itself. Decoration is rare.

The tools were also manufactured of obsidian that came from the island of Melos. They also made marble vases.

Some terracotta figures were found. They are similar to the later Cycladic idols from other islands, but are designed in a much simpler way.

The use of copper is remarkable, as evidenced by slag finds and metallic fragments. Artifacts themselves have not survived.

On the slope of the promontory, a little lower than the settlement, a cist grave cemetery was found. The walls of the graves were made of small flat stones, and each had a number of burials. Children were commonly buried in pottery jars (pithoi). The cemetery may have been in use for about 150 years.

Evidence for metalworking was found, one of the earliest occurrences in the Aegean. Fragments of clay crucibles and small copper artifacts were discovered. The copper that was used at Kephala may have come from the mines in Lavrion in eastern Attica.

Agia Irini is another Neolithic settlement on the island of Kea.

== See also ==
- Saliagos
- Ftelia

== Bibliography ==
- John Coleman: Kephala. A late neolithic settlement and cemetery, Keos : results of excavations conducted by the University of Cincinnati under the auspices of the American School of Classical Studies at Athens, American School of Classical Studies, Princeton, New Jersey 1977, ISBN 0-87661-701-1.
- Werner Ekschmitt: Die Kykladen. Bronzezeit, geometrische und archaische Zeit. Philipp von Zabern, Mainz 1993, ISBN 3-8053-1533-3.
