= Cycladic culture =

Bronze Age culture

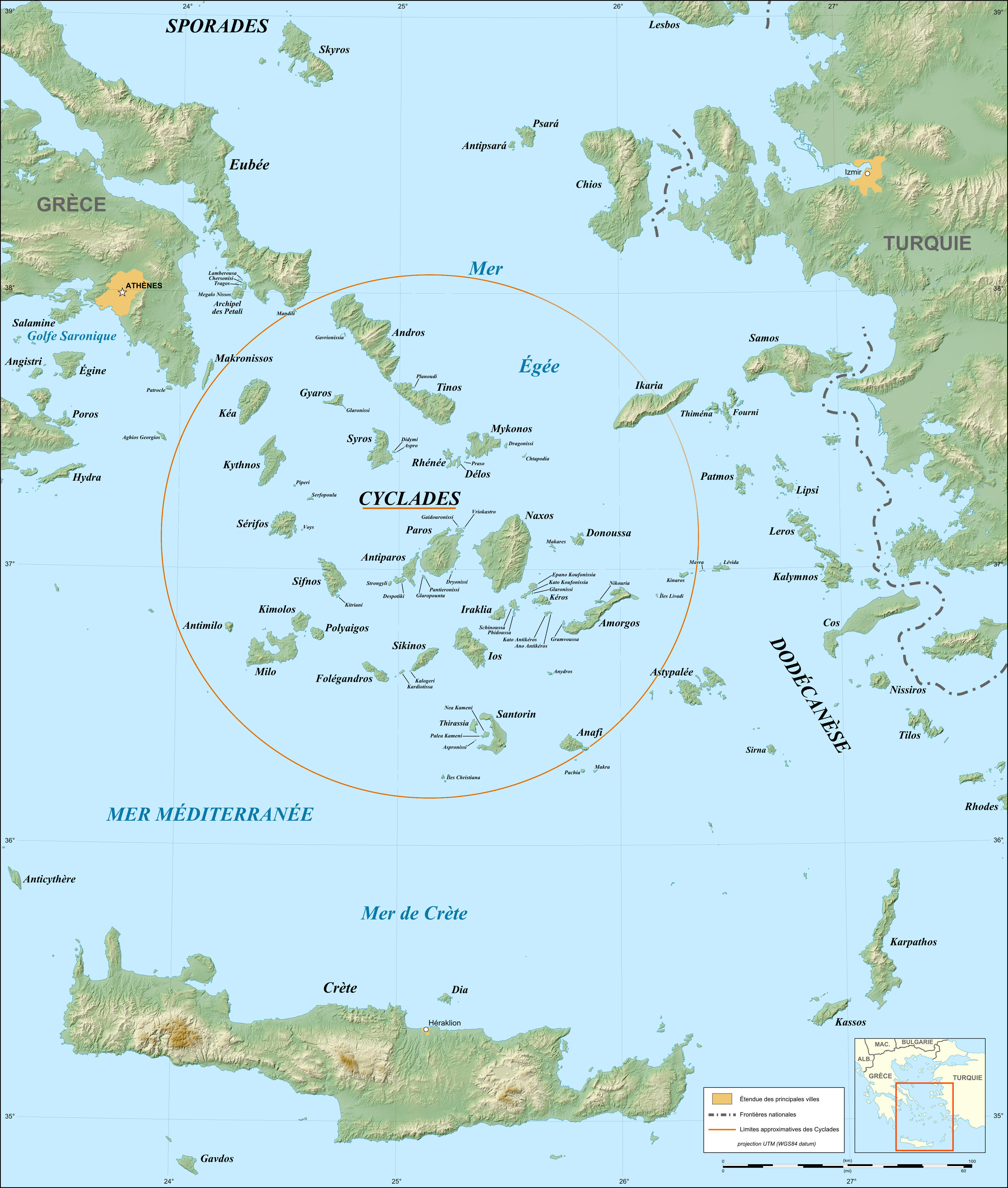
- Period: Bronze Age
- Dates: c. 3100 BC – c. 1000 BC
- Major sites: Grotta (Naxos), Phylakopi, Keros, Syros
- Preceded by: Neolithic Greece
- Followed by: Minoan civilization

Cycladic culture (also known as Cycladic civilisation) was a Bronze Age culture (c. 3100 BC – c. 1000 BC) found throughout the islands of the Cyclades in the Aegean Sea. In chronological terms, it is a relative dating system for artifacts which is roughly contemporary to Helladic chronology (mainland Greece) and Minoan chronology (Crete) during the same period of time.

== History ==
Map of Greece showing major sites that were occupied in the Cycladic culture (clickable map)

=== Late Neolithic Period ===
The significant Late Neolithic and Early Bronze Age Cycladic culture is best known for its schematic flat female (and, rarely, male) figurines of uncertain purpose carved out of the islands' pure white marble. It was roughly contemporaneous with the Middle Bronze Age ("Minoan") culture that arose in Crete, to the south. A distinctive Neolithic culture amalgamating Anatolian and mainland Greek elements arose in the western Aegean in the third millennium BC based on emmer and wild-type barley, sheep and goats, pigs, and tuna that were apparently speared from small boats (Rutter). Excavated sites include Chalandriani, Phylakopi, Skarkos, Saliagos, Amorgos, Naxos and Kephala (on Kea), which showed signs of copper-working.

=== Early Bronze Age ===
Early Cycladic culture evolved in three phases, between c. 3100 and 2300 BC. Excavations at Knossos on Crete reveal an influence of Cycladic civilization upon Knossos in the period 3400 to 2200 BC as evidenced from pottery finds at Knossos. Kea is the location of a Bronze Age settlement at the site now called Ayia Irini, which reached its height in the Late Minoan and Early Mycenaean eras (1600–1400 BC). The Mycenaean town of Naxos (around 1300 BC) covered the area from today's city to the islet of "Palatia." Part of it was discovered under the square in front of the Orthodox Cathedral in Chora, where the archaeological site of Grotta is located today. Naxos has been continuously inhabited since at least the fourth millennium BC. Study of the island's toponyms asserts that Naxos has never been abandoned.

=== Middle Bronze Age ===
Cycladic culture in the Middle Bronze age went through some geographical shifts, as archaeologists have found artifacts and communities that point towards an expansion of Cycladic culture's influence, including on the mainland and Crete. Walls that appear to date to this period show expansion from older Cycladic walls in many areas. One of the main pieces of evidence we have for this period of Cycladic history is pottery. Likewise, graves serve as a primary source of information for this period. Transitions in pottery styles have helped historians pin down a more accurate date range for the Middle Cycladic period.

=== Late Bronze Age ===
Each of the small Cycladic islands could support no more than a few thousand people, though Late Cycladic boat models show that crews of twenty-five oarsmen could be assembled from the scattered communities. When the highly organized palace-culture of Crete arose, the islands became relatively less significant. This occurred when Cycladic culture was increasingly submerged in the rising influence of Minoan Crete. Exceptions to this were Kea, Naxos and Delos; the last of these retained its archaic reputation as a sanctuary through the period of Classical Greek civilization (see Delian League).

=== Chronology ===
The chronology of Cycladic civilization is divided into three major sequences: Early, Middle and Late Cycladic. The early period, beginning c. 3100 BC, segued into the archaeologically murkier Middle Cycladic c. 2000 BC. By the end of the Late Cycladic sequence (c. 1000 BC), there was essential convergence between the Cycladic and Minoan civilizations.

There is some disagreement between the dating systems used for Cycladic civilization, one "cultural" and one "chronological". Attempts to link them lead to varying combinations. A prominent scholarly attempt to do this, as proposed by Oliver Dickinson, can be found below:

Cycladic chronology
Phase	Date	Culture	Contemporary mainland culture
Early Cycladic I (ECI)	3100-2900 BC	Grotta-Pelos	Talioti and Eutresis
Early Cycladic II (ECII)	2700-2200 BC	Keros-Syros culture	Lerna III
Early Cycladic III (ECIII)	2450-2300 BC	Kastri	Lefkandi I
Middle Cycladic I (MCI)	2000-1800 BC	Phylakopi	*
Middle Cycladic II (MCII)	1800-1650 BC	*	*
Middle Cycladic III (MCIII)	1650-1600 BC	*	*
Late Cycladic I	1600-1500 BC	*	*
Late Cycladic II	1500-1350 BC	*	*
Late Cycladic III	1350-1000 BC	*	Submycenaean

* Indicates this space is left intentionally blank due to lack of scholarly data.

== Archaeology ==
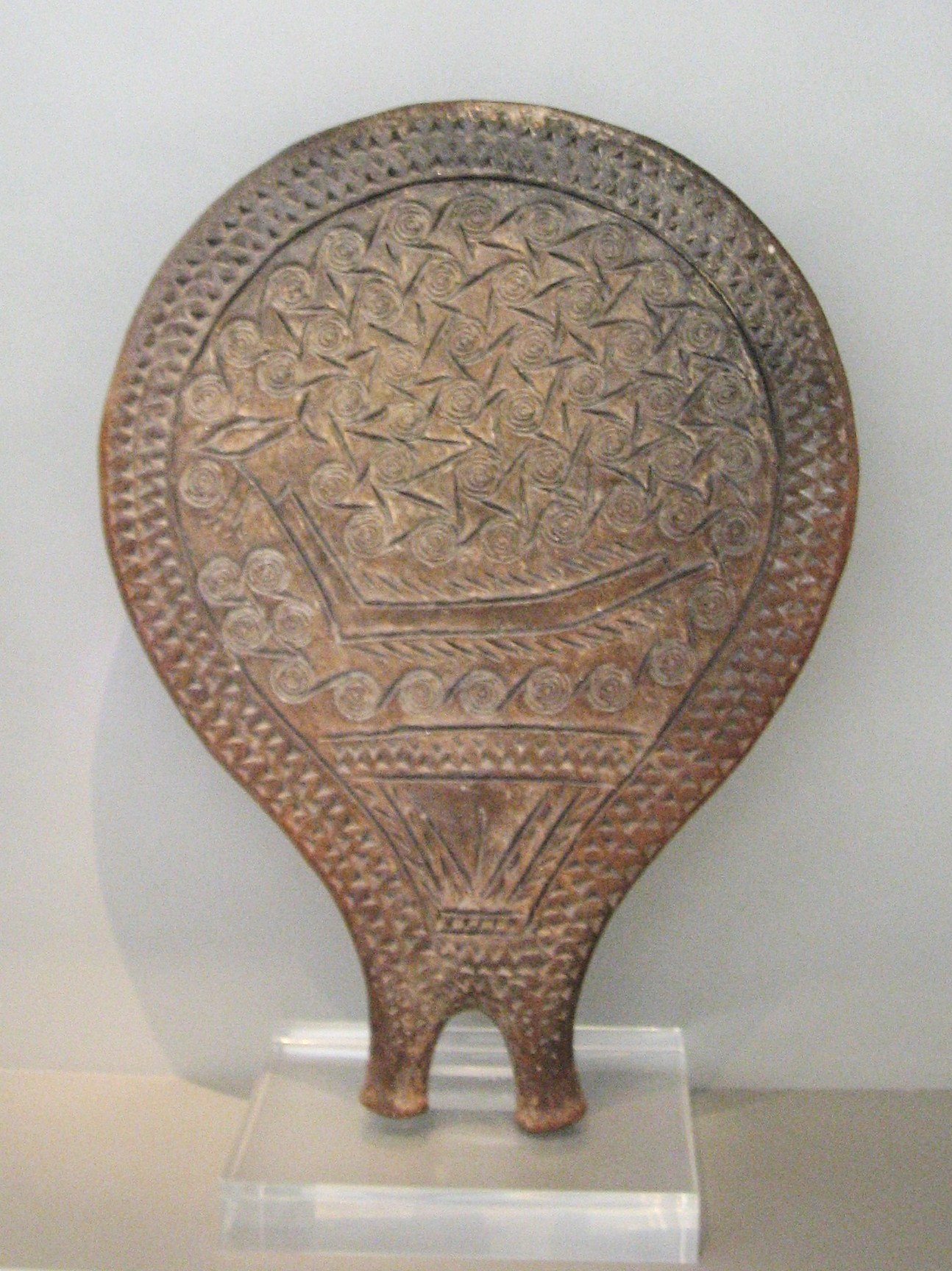
Frying-pan with incised decoration of a ship. Early Cycladic II, Chalandriani, Syros 2800–2300 BC

The initial archaeological excavations of the 1880s, undertaken by antiquaries such as Theodore Bent, were followed by systematic work by the British School at Athens and by Christos Tsountas, who investigated burial sites on several islands in 1898–99 and coined the term "Cycladic civilization". Interest then lagged, but picked up in the mid-20th century, partially to collectors taking an interest in owning artifacts from Early Cycladic cemeteries.

=== Pottery ===
Pottery makes up a large part of the artifacts we have, especially in context, from Cycladic culture. Pottery has played a large role in sectioning Cycladic chronology into different periods. This is due to shifts in style and materials over time.

Pottery was also hugely important to Cycladic culture in the context of their maritime activities. Evidence suggests that pottery was a primary good traded to and from the Cyclades via boats, especially during the Early Cycladic period.

=== Evidence of seafaring ===
While there are no discovered surviving boats from this time and place, other types of archaeological finds have helped historians piece together evidence of a rich seafaring practice in Cycladic culture. Discoveries include the Cycladic frying pans, whose original functions remain unknown. Despite the mysteries that come with them, Cycladic frying pans offer insight into Cycladic culture through their imagery. The pan pictured in this section, as well as others that archaeologists have found, depicts a ship, which is indicative of the importance of seafaring to Cycladic peoples. This also gives us a good idea of how Cycladic ships would have been constructed. There were likely two kinds of ships, a small boat meant to be managed by one person or a very small crew, and a longboat that could support a crew of at least twenty five people.

== Gallery ==
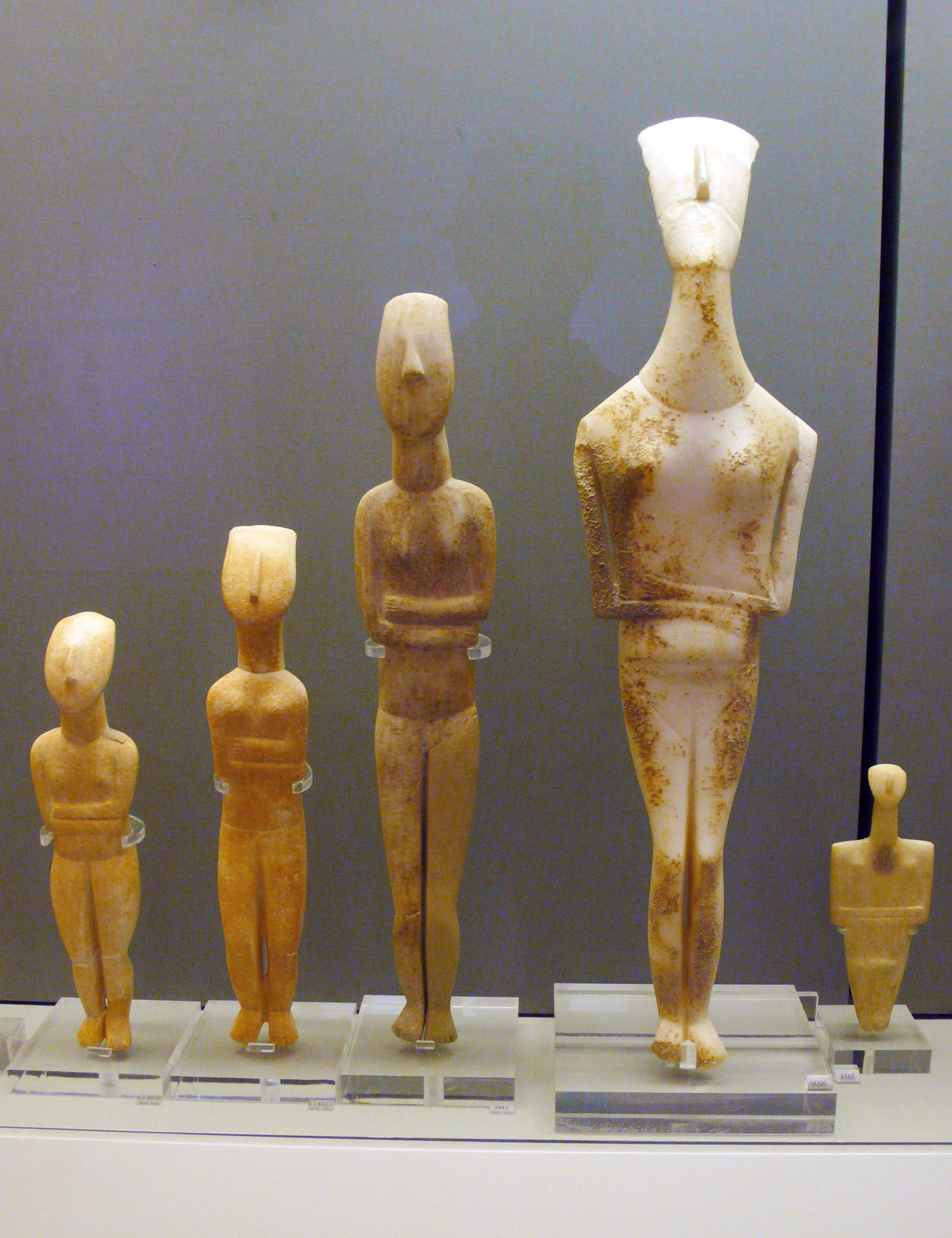
Collection of marble figurines of varying sizes. Early Cycladic II period, Keros-Syros Culture, 2800-2300 BC. National Archaeological Museum, Athens

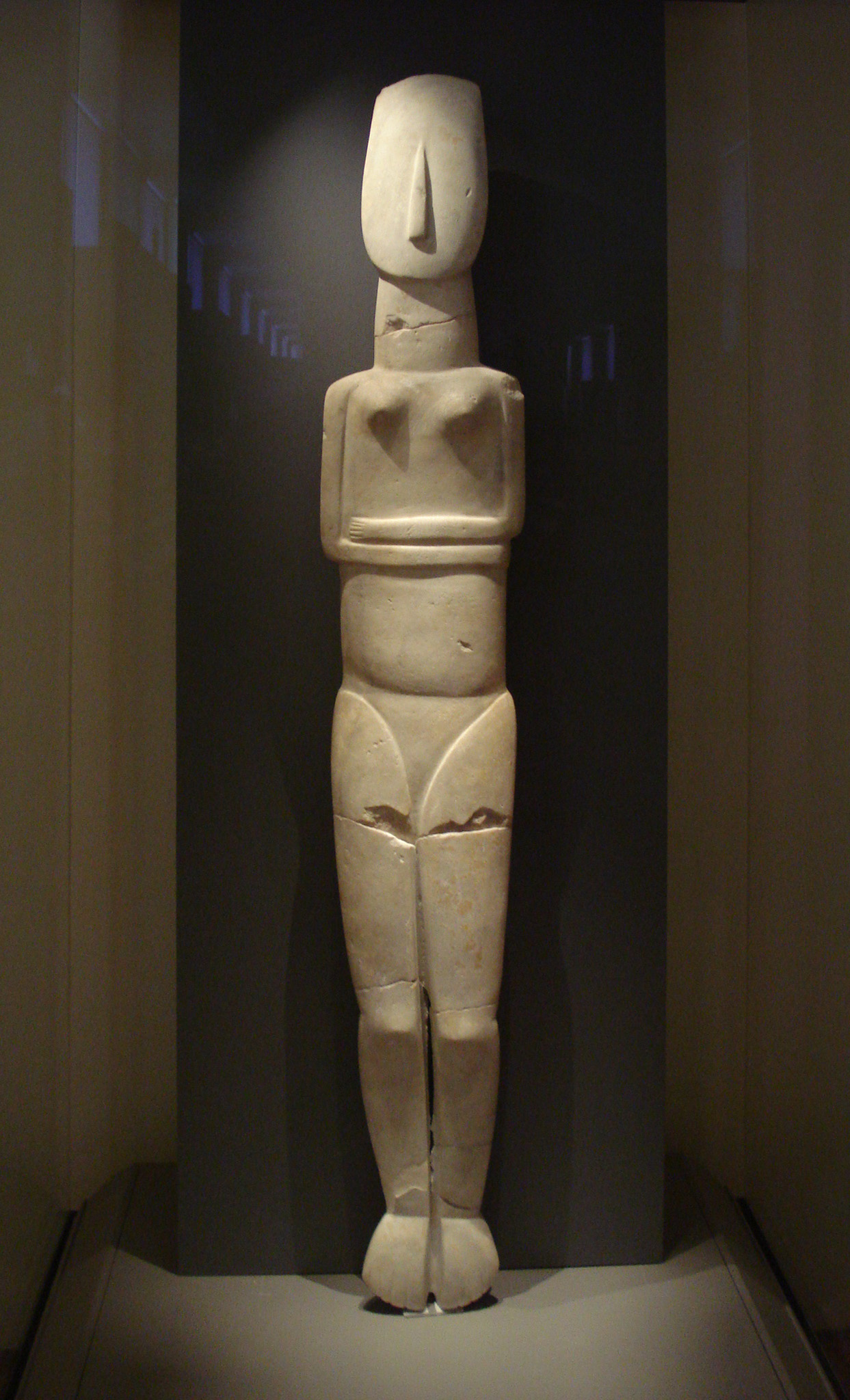
Cycladic idol, Parian marble; 1.5 m high (largest known example of Cycladic sculpture) 2800–2300 BC

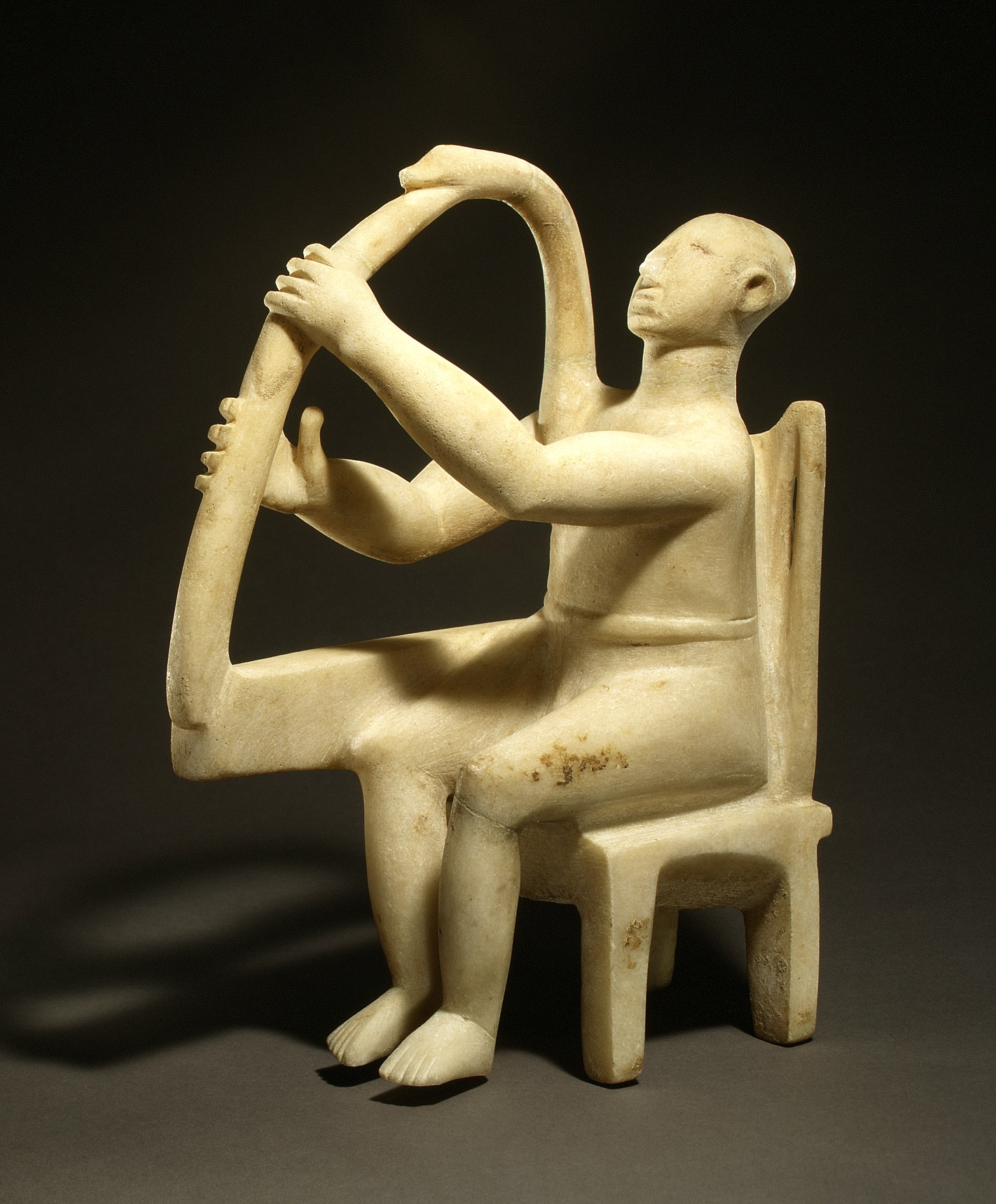
Marble seated harp player, 2800-2700 BC

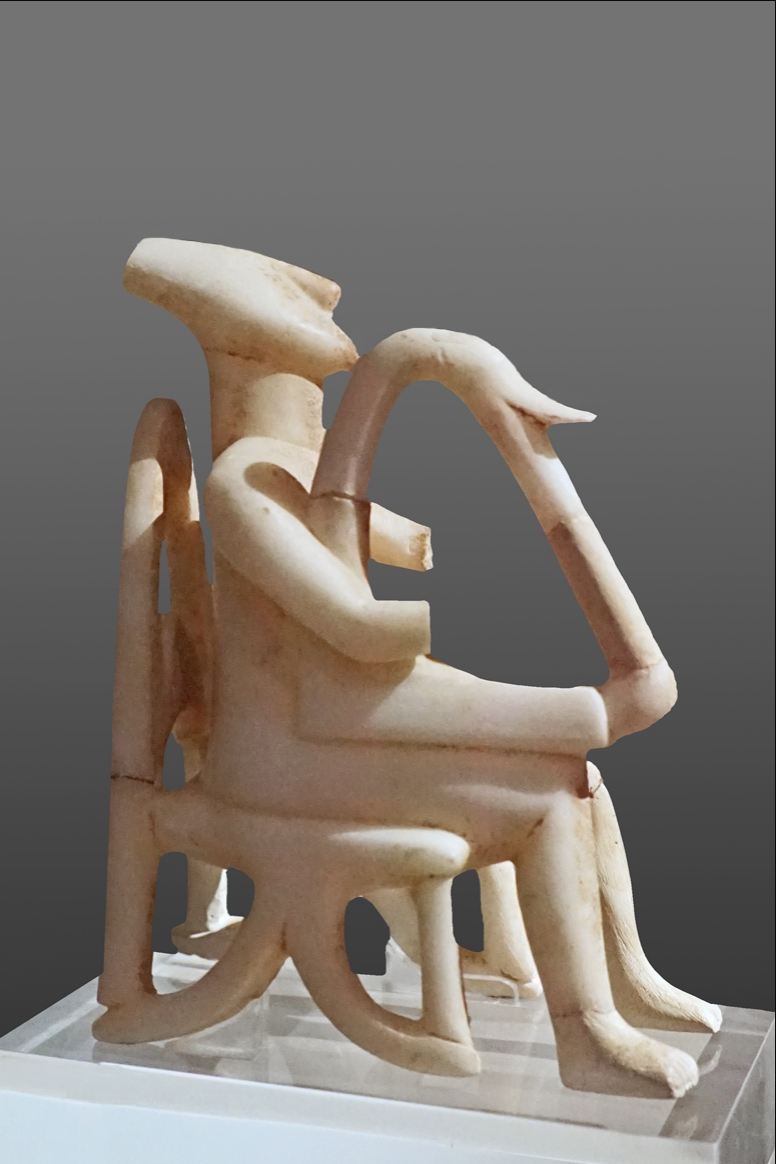
Marble seated harp player from Keros, c. 2600 BC

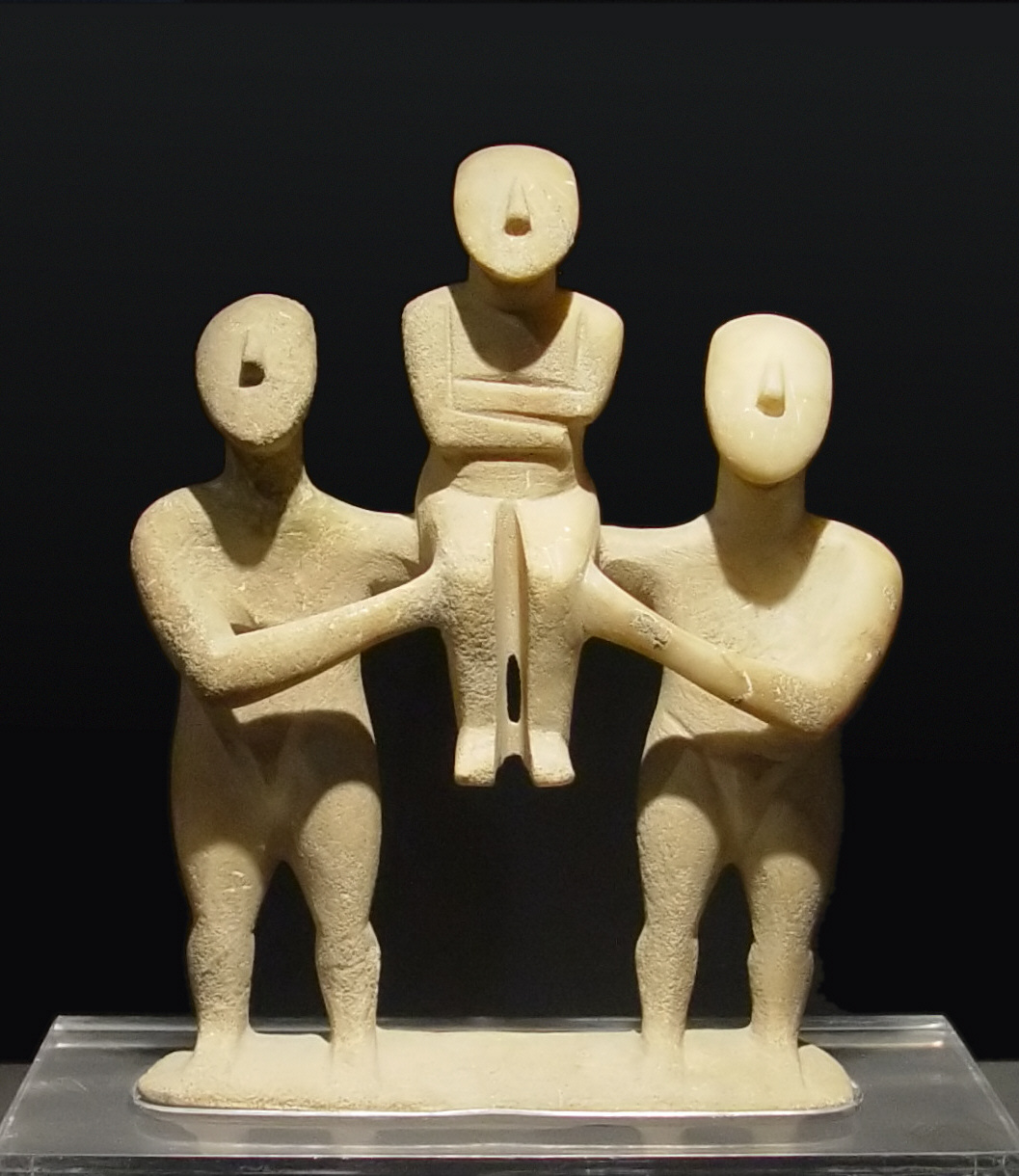
Group of three figurines, Early Cycladic II period

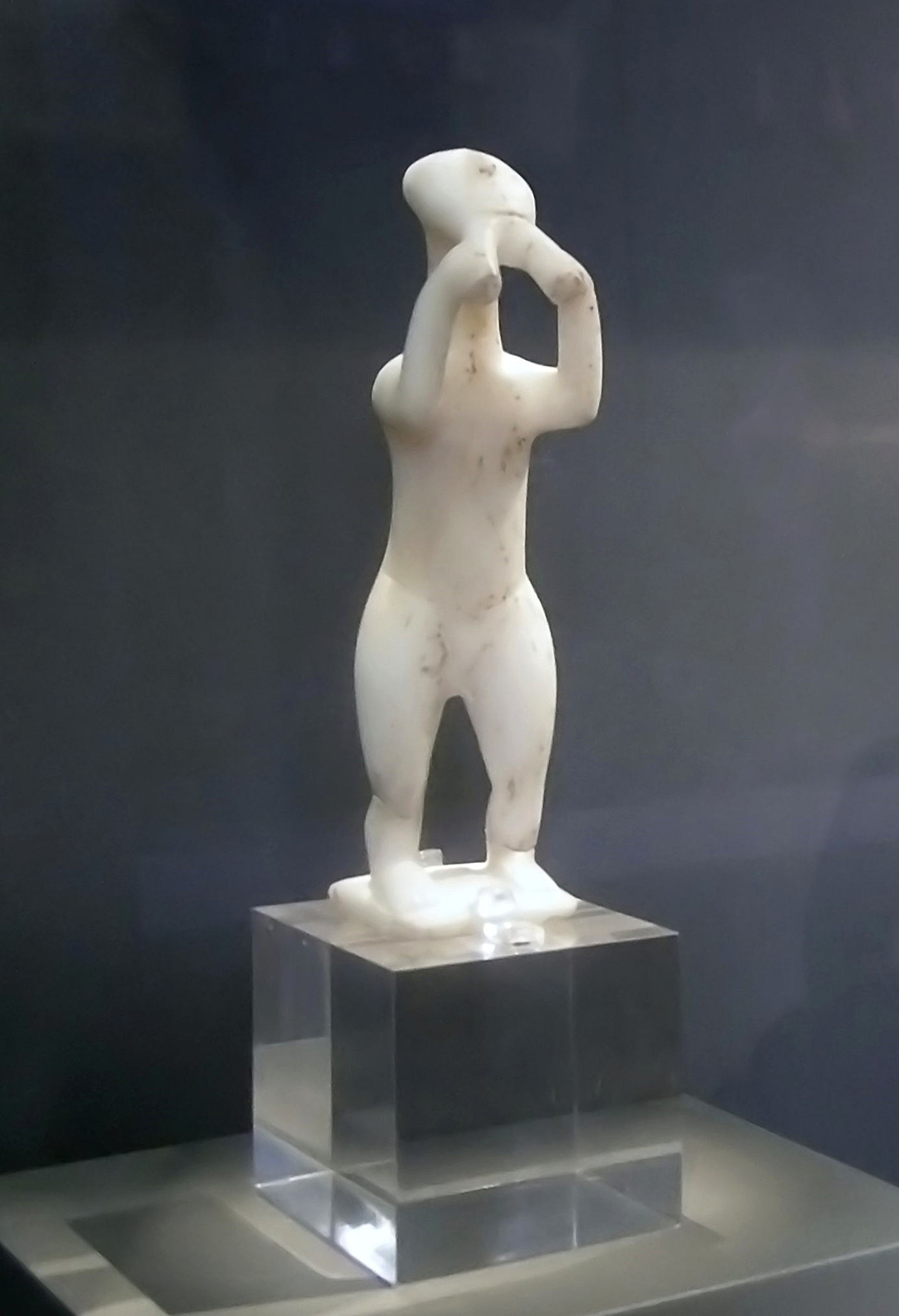
Aulos player from Keros, c. 2600 BC

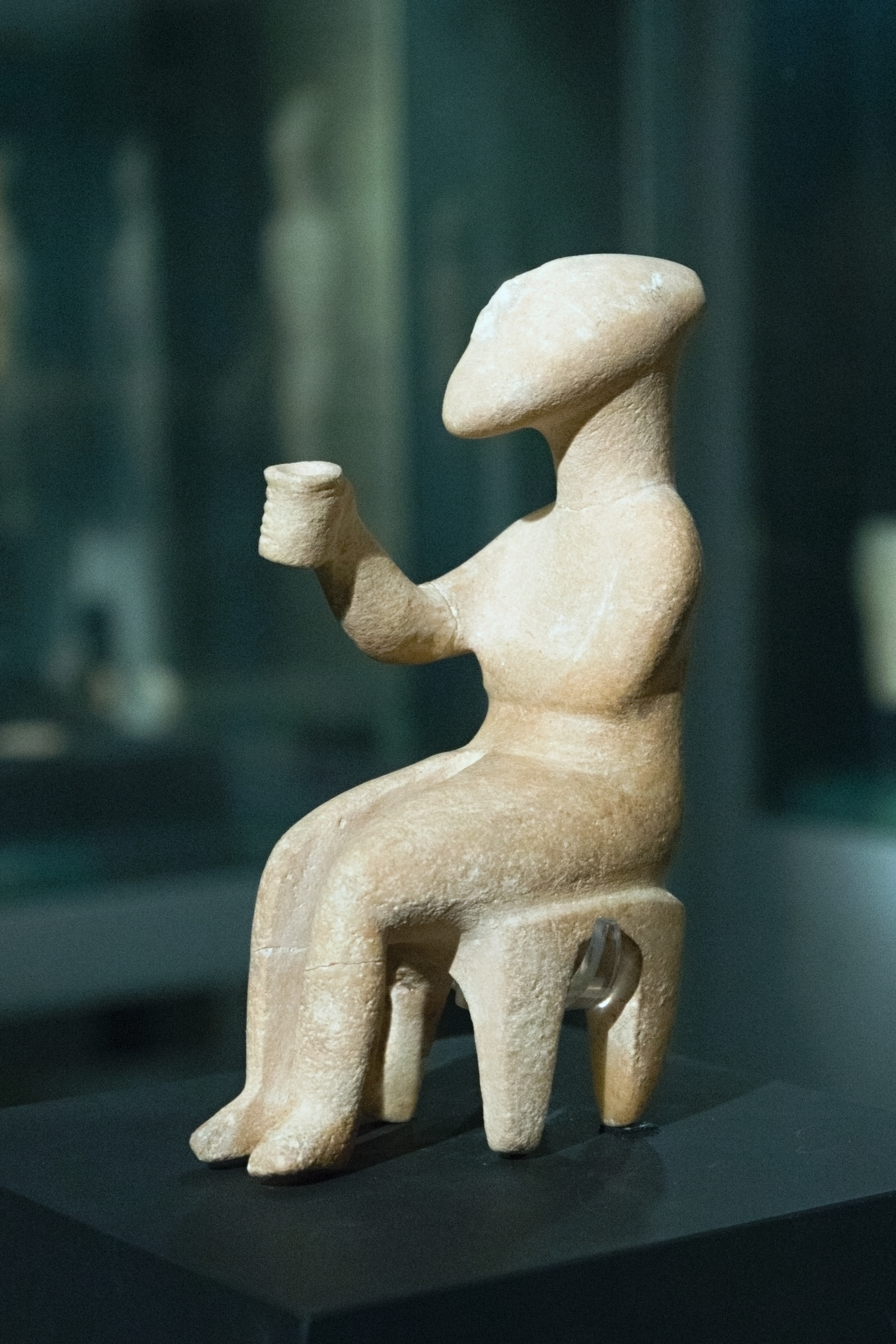
Seated figure with cup, 2800-2300 BC

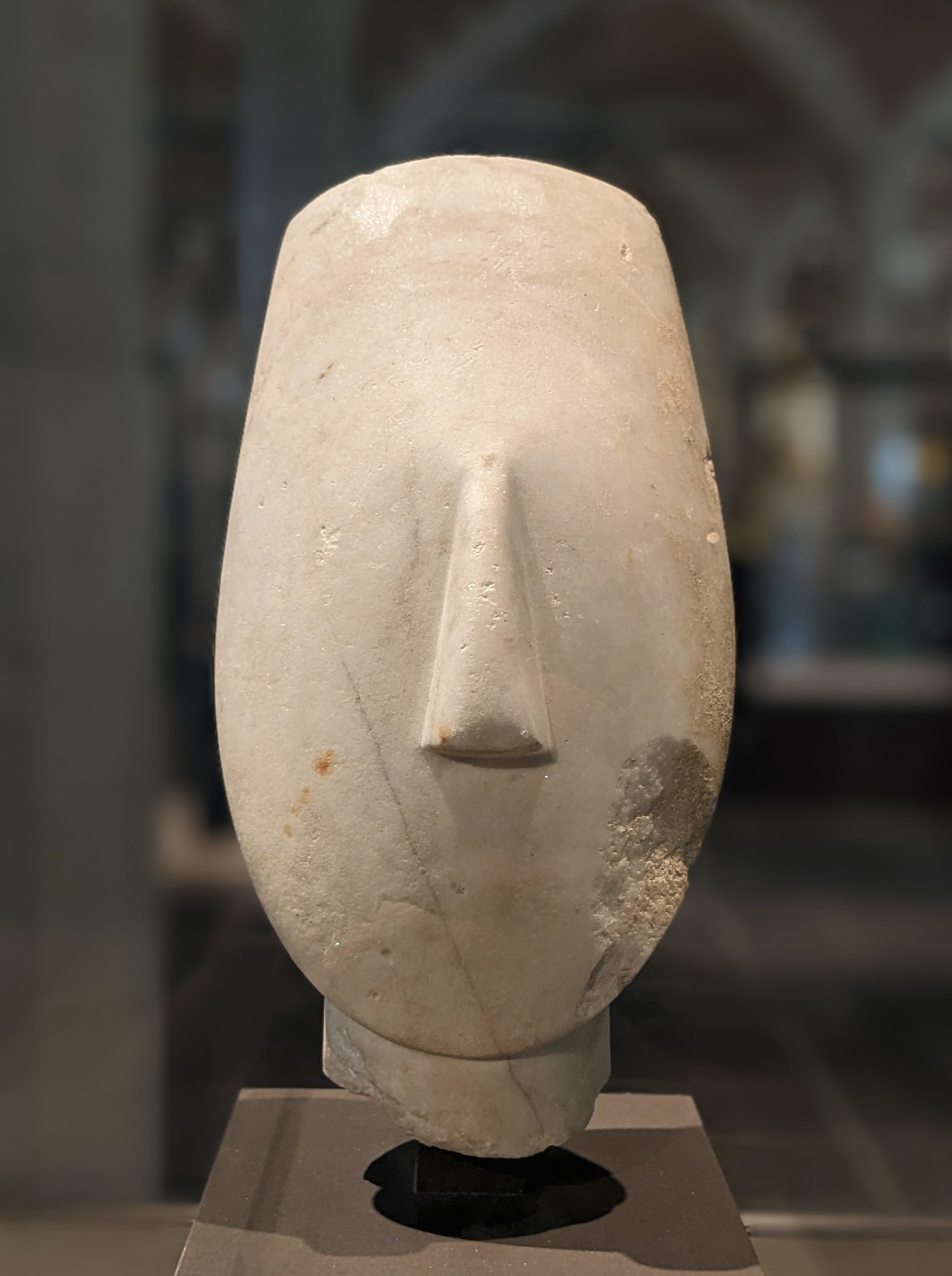
Marble head from Keros, c. 2700 BC

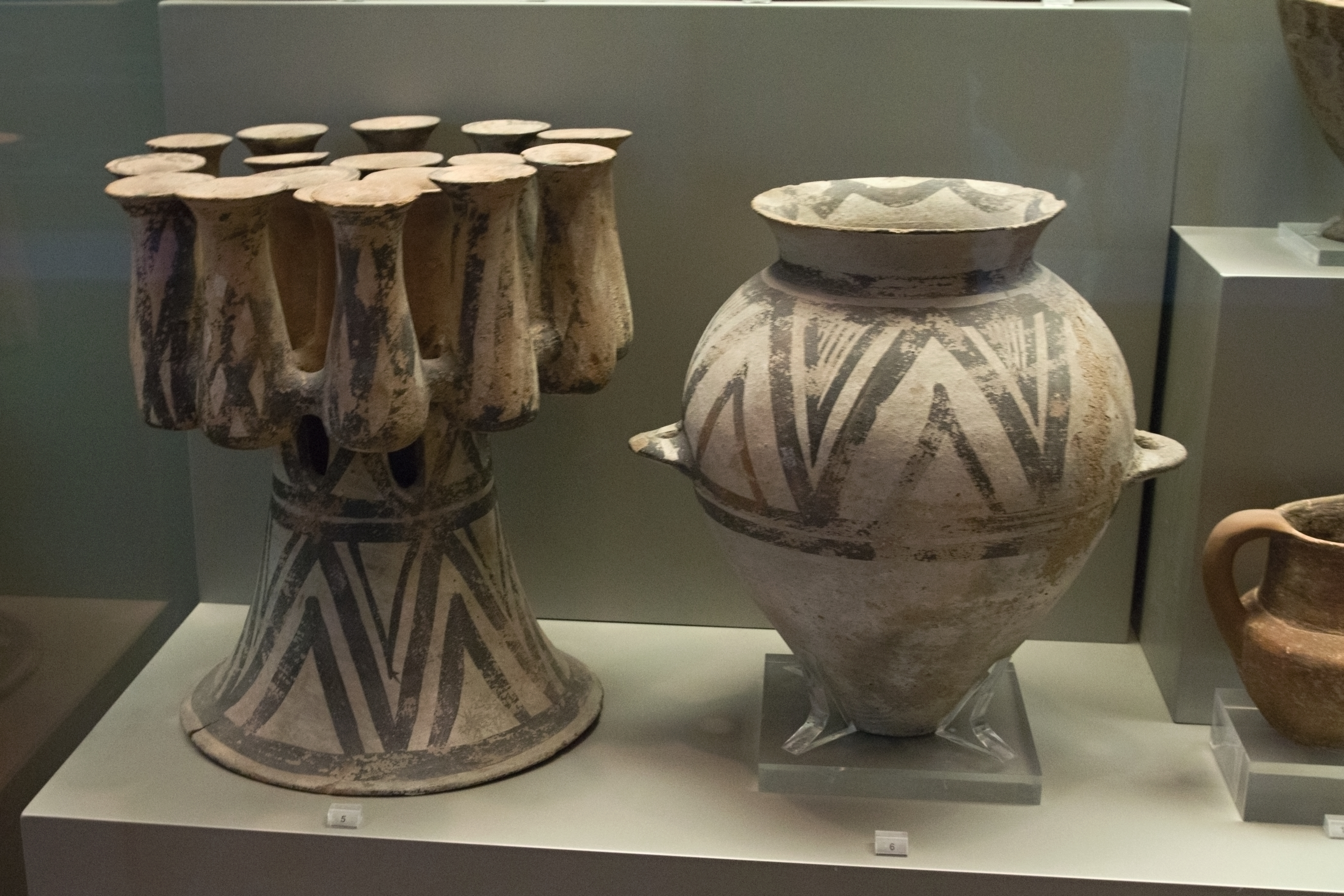
Ceramic vessels from Phylakopi on Milos, 2300-2000 BC

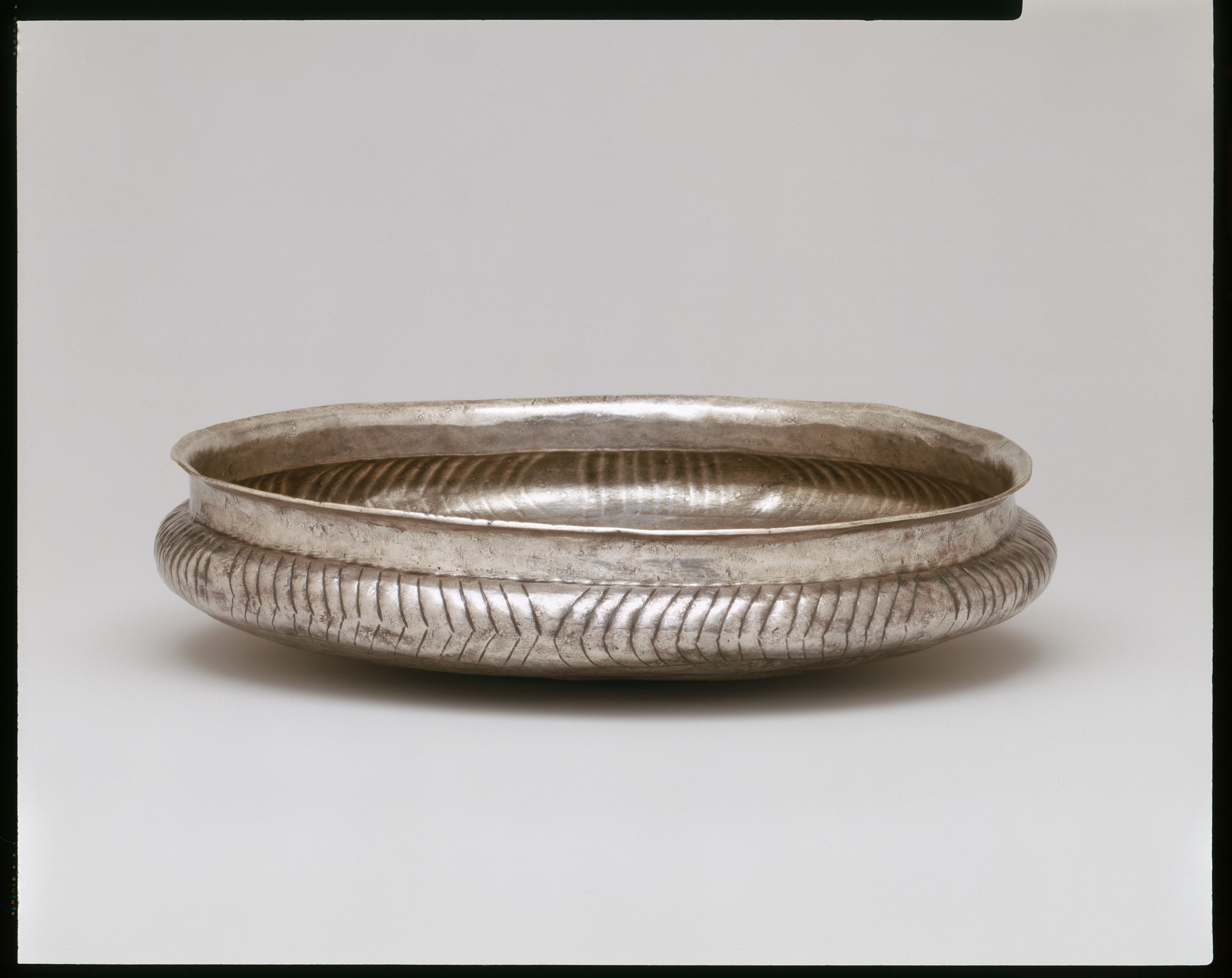
Silver bowl, c. 3200-2200 BC

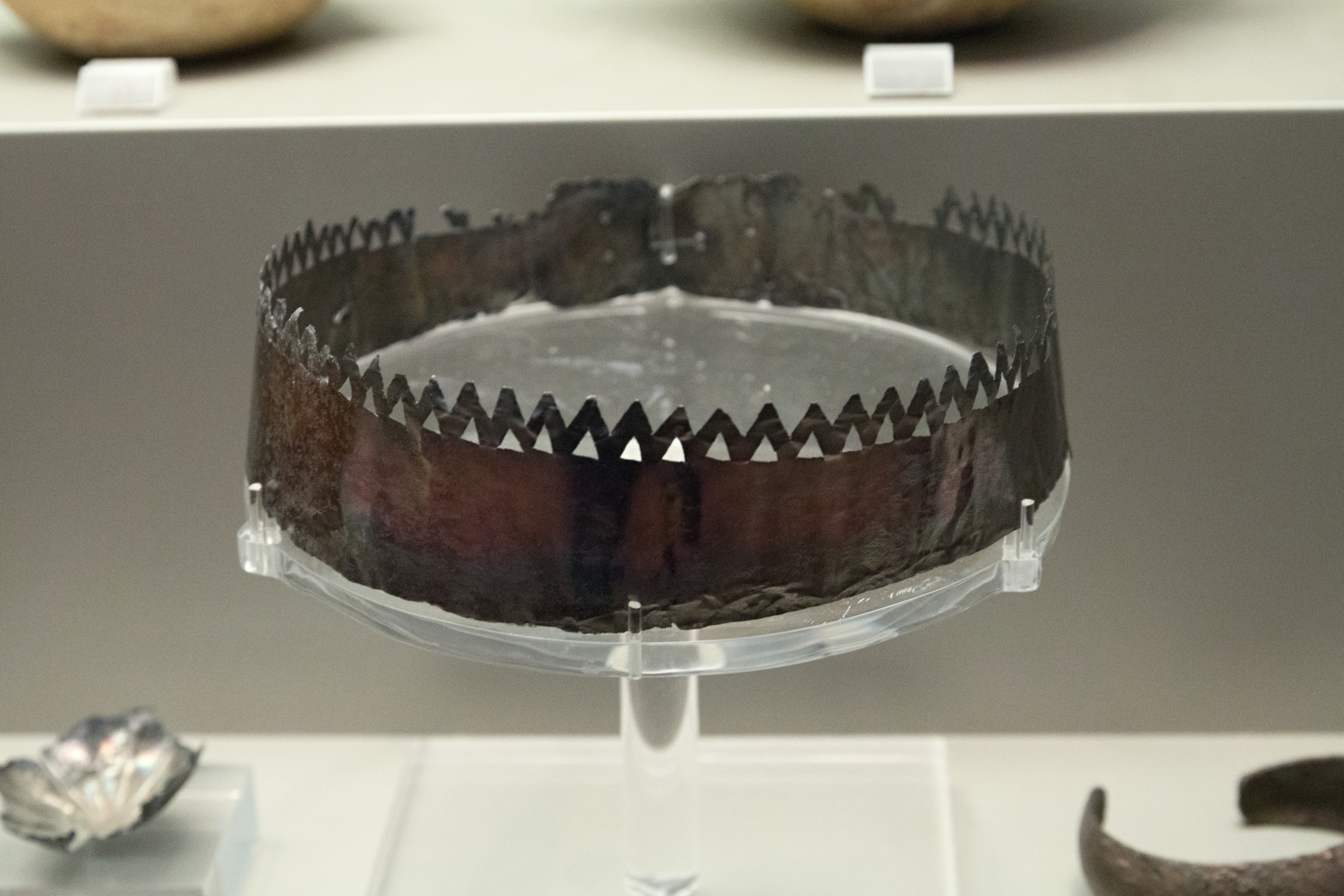
Silver diadem from Amorgos, 2800-2300 BC

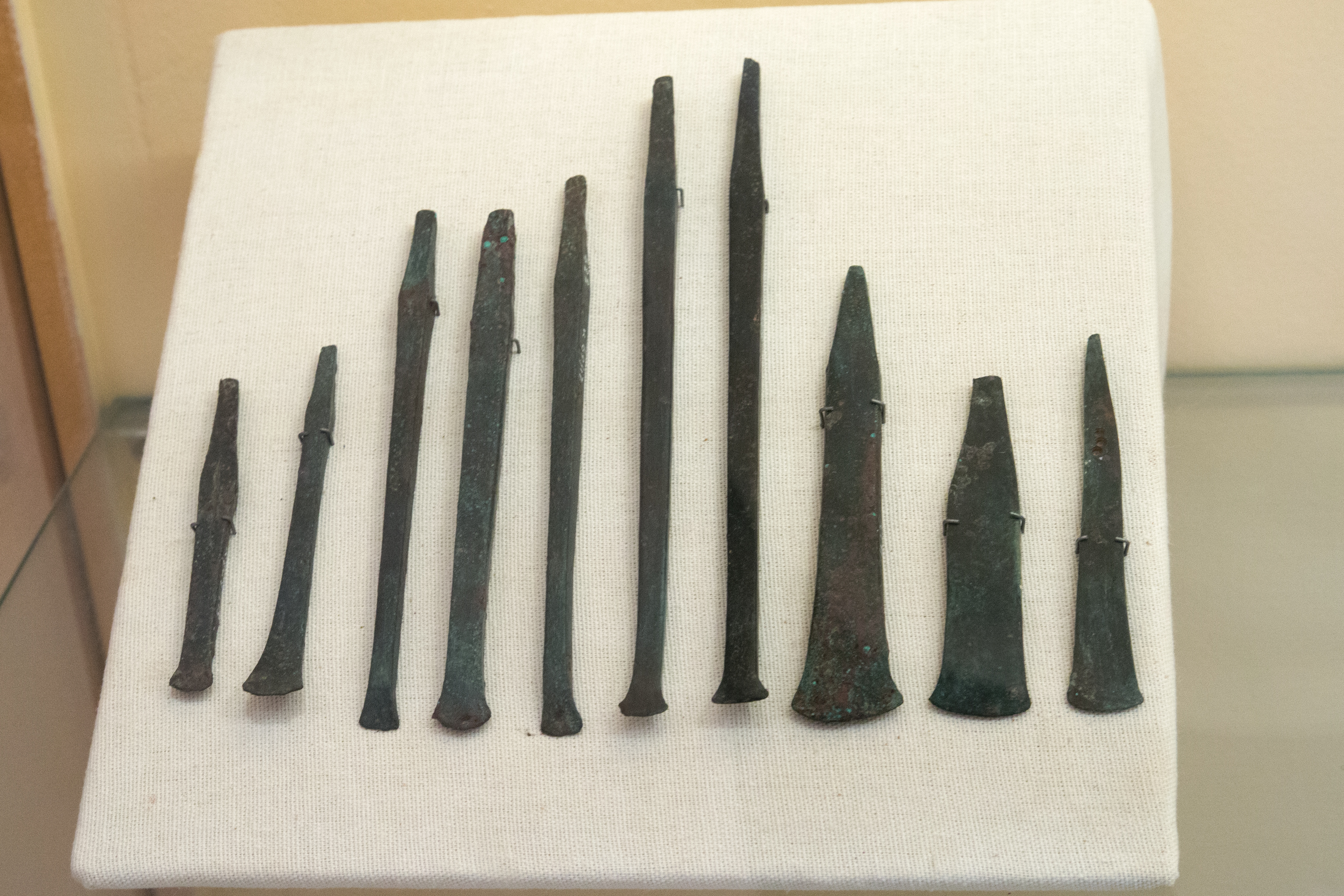
Bronze tools from Kastri, 2300 BC

== Artifact looting and forgery ==
Studies of Cycladic culture have faced significant difficulties due to artifact looting. Since the early 1900s, private collectors have coveted Cycladic figures and other artifacts, leading to a huge illicit trade in these items. These figures have typically been stolen from burials to satisfy the Cycladic antiquities market. This really began as collectors competed for the modern-looking figures that seemed so similar to a sculpture by Jean Arp or Constantin Brâncuși. Sites were looted and a brisk trade in forgeries arose. The context for many of these Cycladic figurines has thus been mostly destroyed; their meaning may never be completely understood as a result. It has been suggested that around 90% of the figures we know of were looted or removed from their original locations in a unscientific manner, resulting in the loss of context with which to build a proper historical narrative.

Between 2009 and 2010, scholars were able to meet with a man they simply identified as "the forger", and obtained inside information about the illicit process of funneling artifacts and forgeries to collectors, as well as how these forgeries were being produced. This has helped archaeologists and scholars to properly identify forgeries with more accuracy, as well as to trace certain artifacts back to their original locations more accurately.

== See also ==
- Cycladic art
- Goulandris Museum of Cycladic Art
- History of the Cyclades
