= Ftelia =

Beach in Mykonos, Greece

Coordinates: 37°27′40″N 25°22′30″E

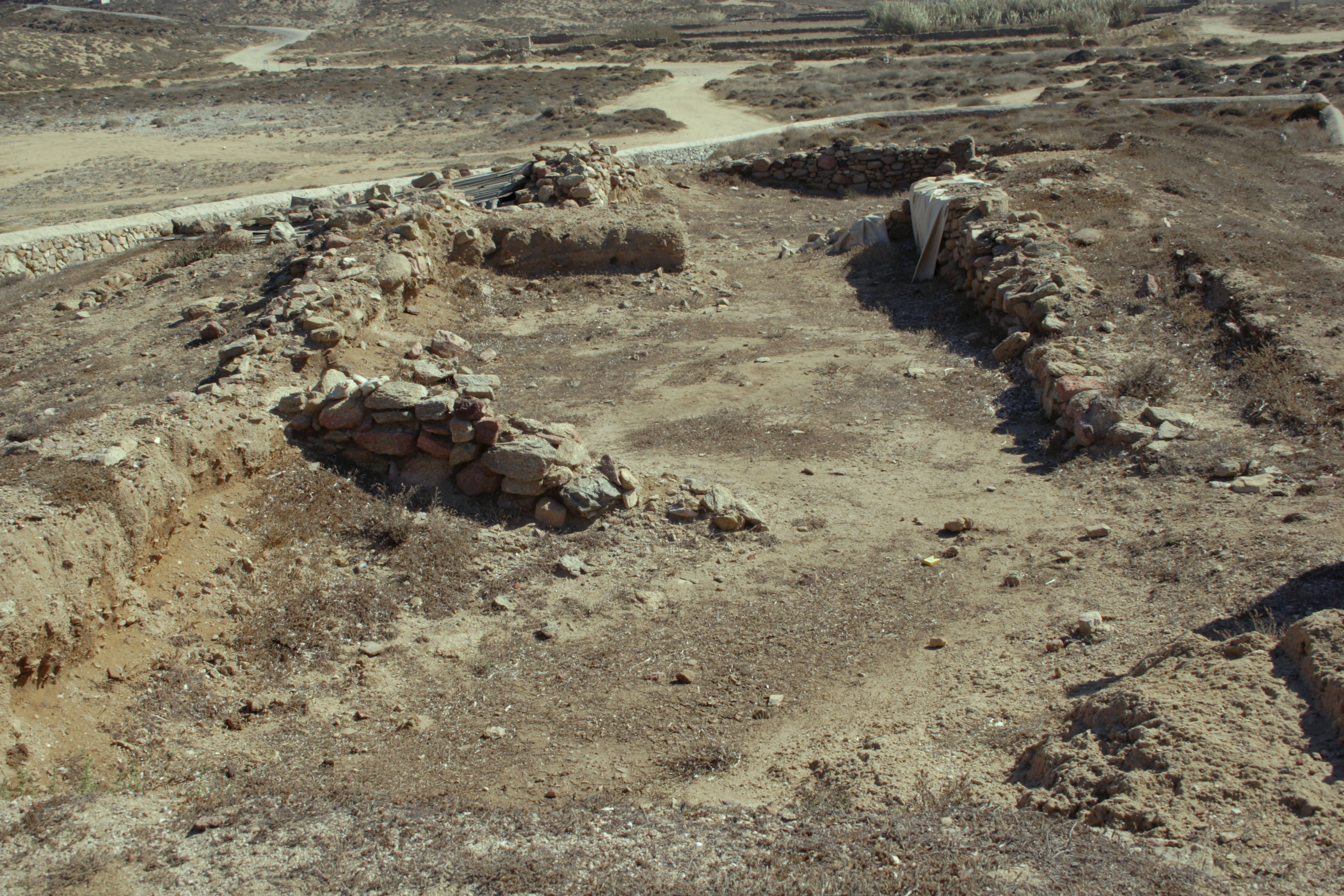
Building remnants of the Early Cycladic settlement from the Early Bronze Age or end of Neolithic. Ftelia on Mykonos.

Ftelia (Greek: Φτελιά) is an archaeological site located on a beach on the island of Mykonos, Greece.

== Archaeology ==
This waterfront location has become known in late 1990s for the famous neolithic settlement found here. It is attributed to the Saliagos culture of the early Final Neolithic and is known for the diverse finds of building foundations, pottery, metalworking and stone figurines. The settlement was dated to 5000 to 4500 BC using the 14C method. It was discovered in 1992 and excavated from 1995 onwards.

Archaeologists found wall foundations, a large variety of ceramic sherds of various types, stone tools, traces of metal processing and a total of 19 stone figurines, 13 of which represent people and 6 represent animals.

The building foundations show several phases, which suggests permanent settlement over a longer period of time. The size of the settlement recognized so far suggests around 150 to 200 residents.

Comparable to similar Neolithic complexes of Kephala, Saliagos, Grotta (Naxos), and Kythnos, the settlement is exposed to north winds almost all year round. Since, at the time of the settlement of Ftelia, the sea level was 10m lower, it is assumed that the settlement was in the middle of a relatively fertile coastal plain.

Ftelia is considered to be the most important known settlement of the Late Neolithic in the Cyclades, ahead of Saliagos. The location of the island of Mykonos and its cultural affinity with relatively distant regions suggests that Ftelia was an important hub through which techniques and materials such as rocks and particularly obsidian were exchanged.

== Architecture ==
All of the walls are largely made of rubble from the local granite, with flat stones being used for the foundations. Sandstone was occasionally used. There is evidence of mudbricks, but they have not survived.

== Excavations ==
The inhabitants of Ftelia were already farmers. Grass pea (Lathyrus sativus) were their staple food; more than 50% of all food finds could be assigned to this species. Lentils, another legume came next. Barley was the only grain used. Sheep and goats were also kept. Pigs and cattle were already known, but only played a minor role.

Fishing and hunting deer served as a supplement. Despite the location of the settlement by the sea, the finds indicate that fishing and collecting sea snails and mussels was not the main focus of the diet. Unlike at Saliagos, few seafood remains have been found and no fish hooks or harpoon points have been found. Diet in Ftelia is interpreted as meaning that the inhabitants brought their methods of food production with them from the mainland, and did not adapt them to the settlement on the island.

== Metalwork ==
The early metal industry from Ftelia has attracted considerable attention. It is of great significance to our understanding of the inception of metalwork. The metal finds have been dated to the early 5th millennium BCE, which may be the earliest in the Aegean.

"A gold artifact, copper artefacts and copper product are known from the first building phase; copper artefacts and copper product from the successive phases. At least one example of copper ore has been demonstrated."

A circular gold object from the earliest settlement phase of Ftelia has been dated to the first half of the 5th millennium BC, which makes it "the earliest securely dated gold object of the Aegean" (originally it was identified as a silver object, but its identity had then been clarified in the lab).

Several other early sites from the Aegean also show parallels with Ftelia metalwork, such as Yali.

"Roughly contemporary with the finds from Yali are copper and gold artefacts from Zas ['Zeus cave'] (Naxos),90 and copper from de:Strofilas (Andros).91 There is also a copper axe from Knossos,92 evidence for copper working from Kephala Petras (Crete),93 and possibly contemporary copper artefacts from Chrysokamino [near Kavousi in eastern Crete].94"

The ancient community at Ftelia was most likely occupied from Euboea on the Greek peninsula. Some scholars suggested that Ftelia was part of the same metallurgical tradition as Bulgaria and Yugoslavia, but this may be disputed. Nevertheless, the Ftelia artefacts are of a comparably early date with many Balkan finds.

Also, the spondylus beads common in the North, such as for example at the Theopetra Cave in Thessaly, Greece, have also been found at Ftelia. Thus, there's good evidence that the two way exchange of goods existed at the time with northern areas.

== Modern beach and tourism ==
Its location on the northern side of the island has established the beach as a windsurfer's paradise, as there is almost always a strong wind blowing. Ftelia is an isolated, very tranquil place and even during the busy Mykonos months of July and August it is not very crowded because it is often quite windy and dusty. In ancient times, here was believed to be the tomb of the Iliad war hero Ajax the Locrian.
