= Archaeological Museum of Paros =

Archaeological Museum in Parikia, Paros, Greece

Coordinates: 37°5′4.4″N 25°9′9.7″E

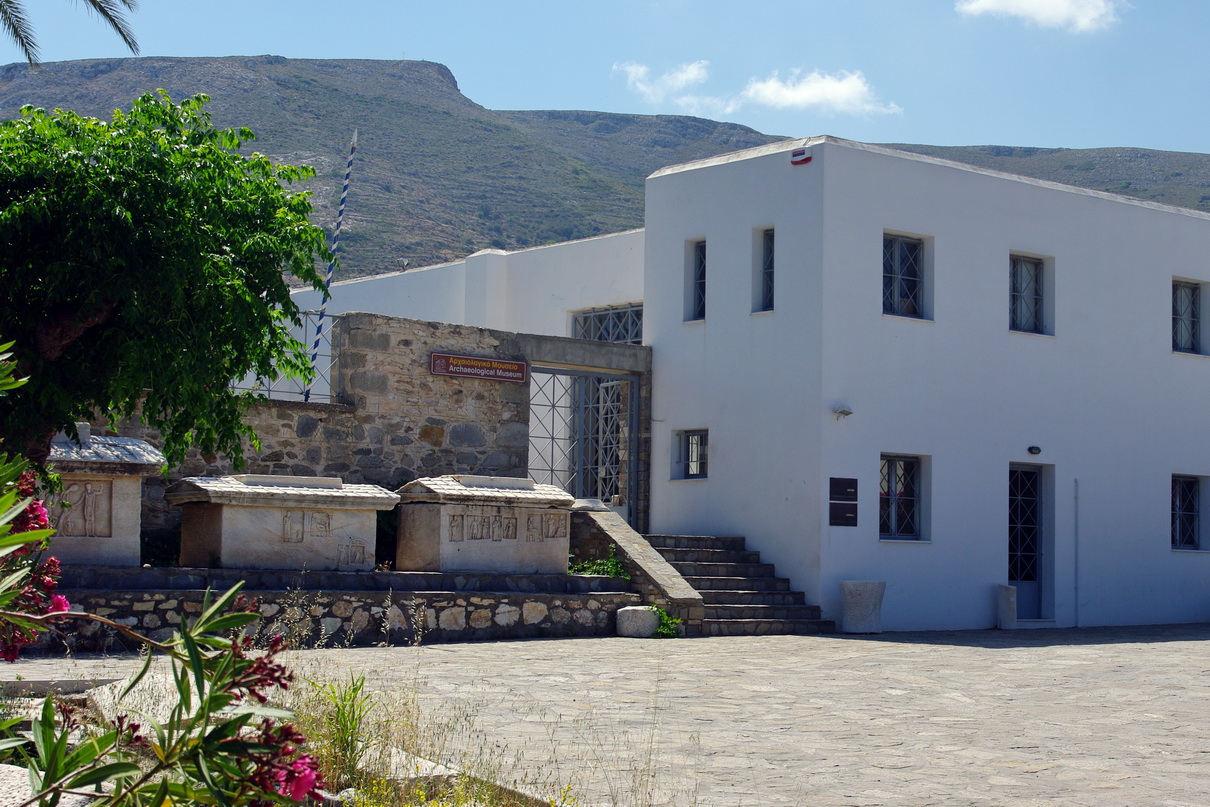
- Established: 1960
- Location: Parikia, Paros, Greece
- Type: Archaeological Museum

The Archaeological Museum of Paros is a museum located in Parikia on Paros, Greece. The museum was founded in 1960 and consists of two rooms and an atrium.

== Museum plan ==
Room A contains Archaic and Classical sculptures. Room B contains pottery, sculptures, and small finds from the Neolithic to the Roman period. The atrium contains sculptures, architectural parts, urns, and a Roman period mosaic floor.

Floor map of the Archaeological Museum of Paros

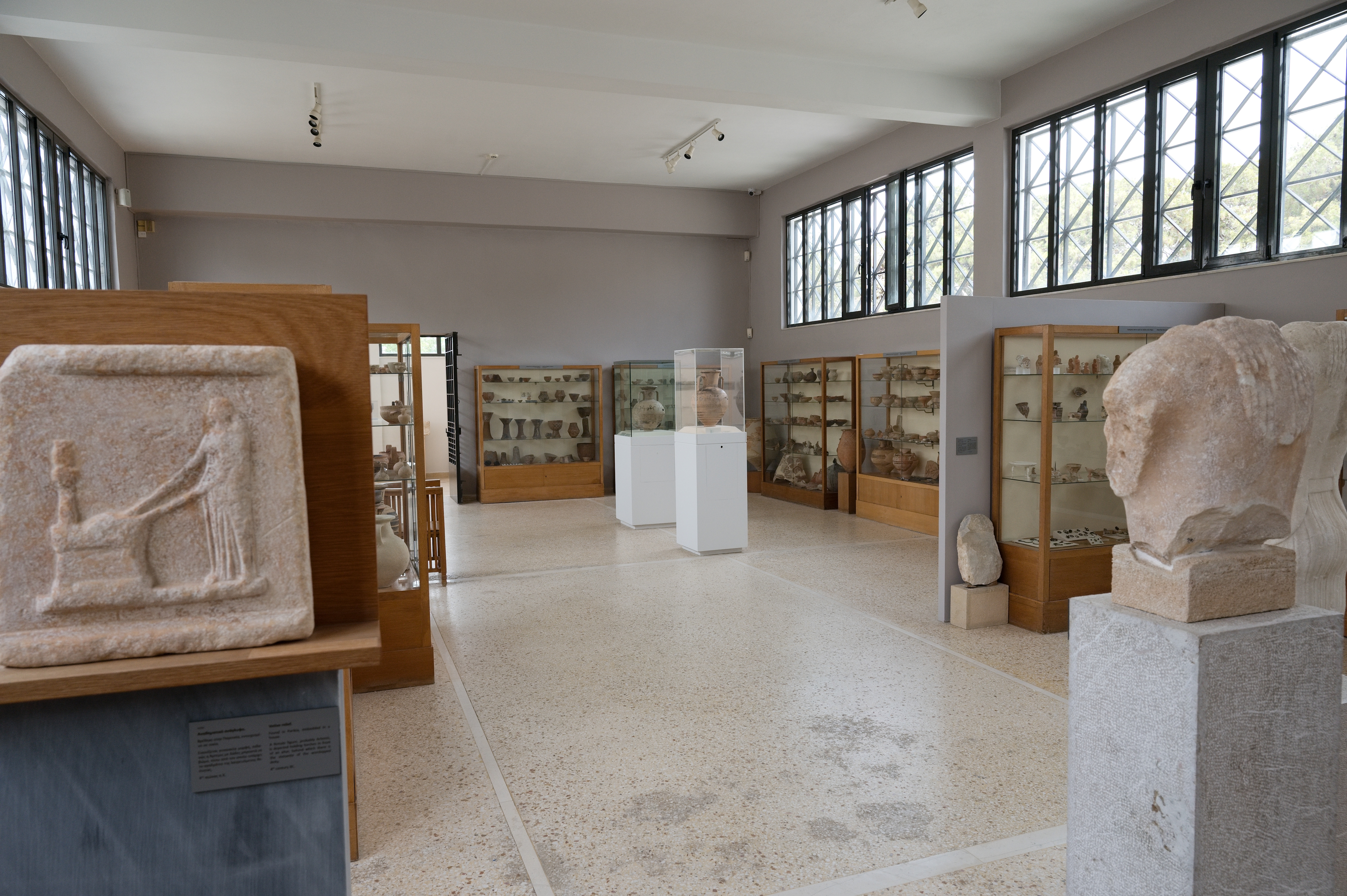
View of Room C

== Notable exhibits ==
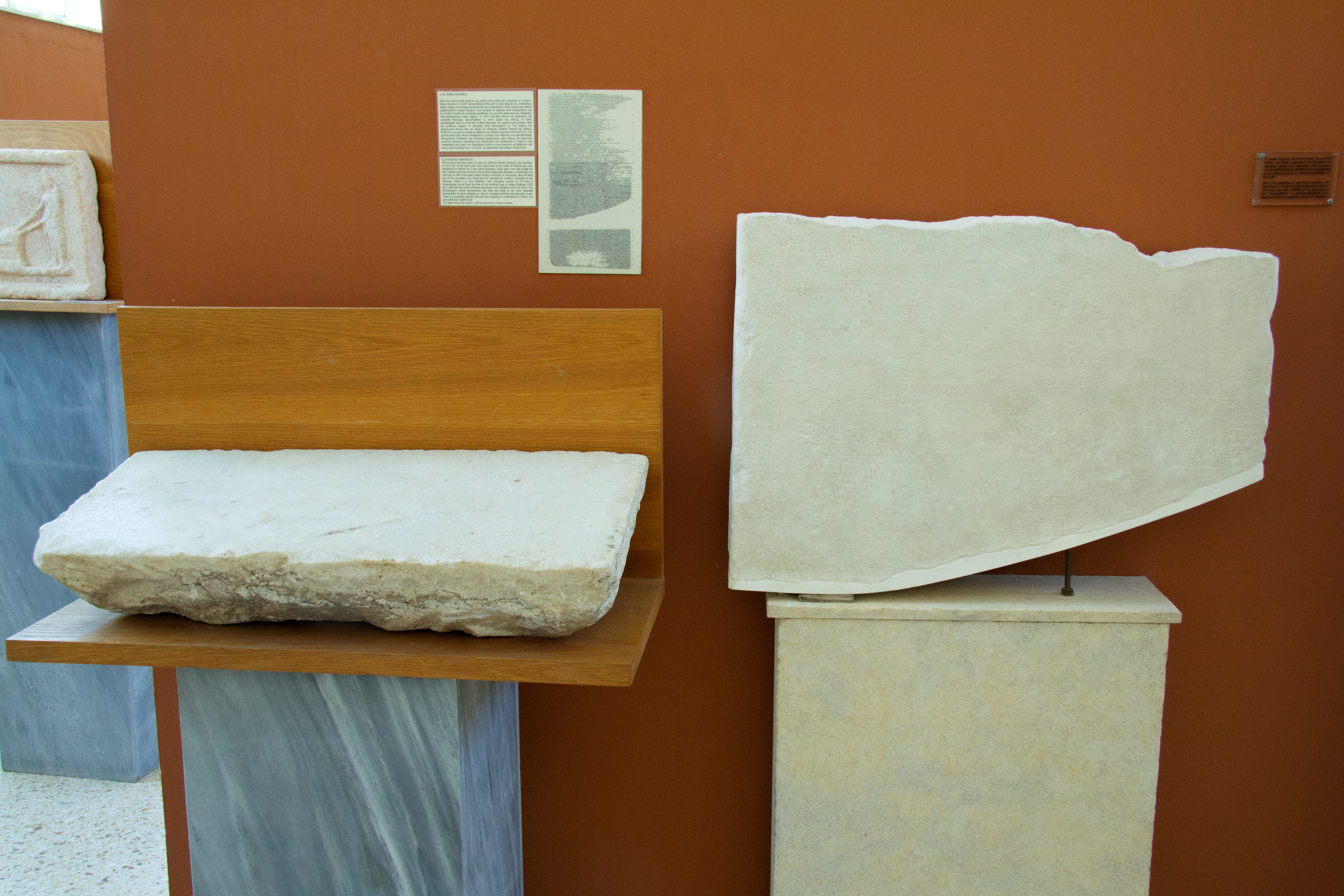
Part of the Parian Chronicle, 3rd century BC

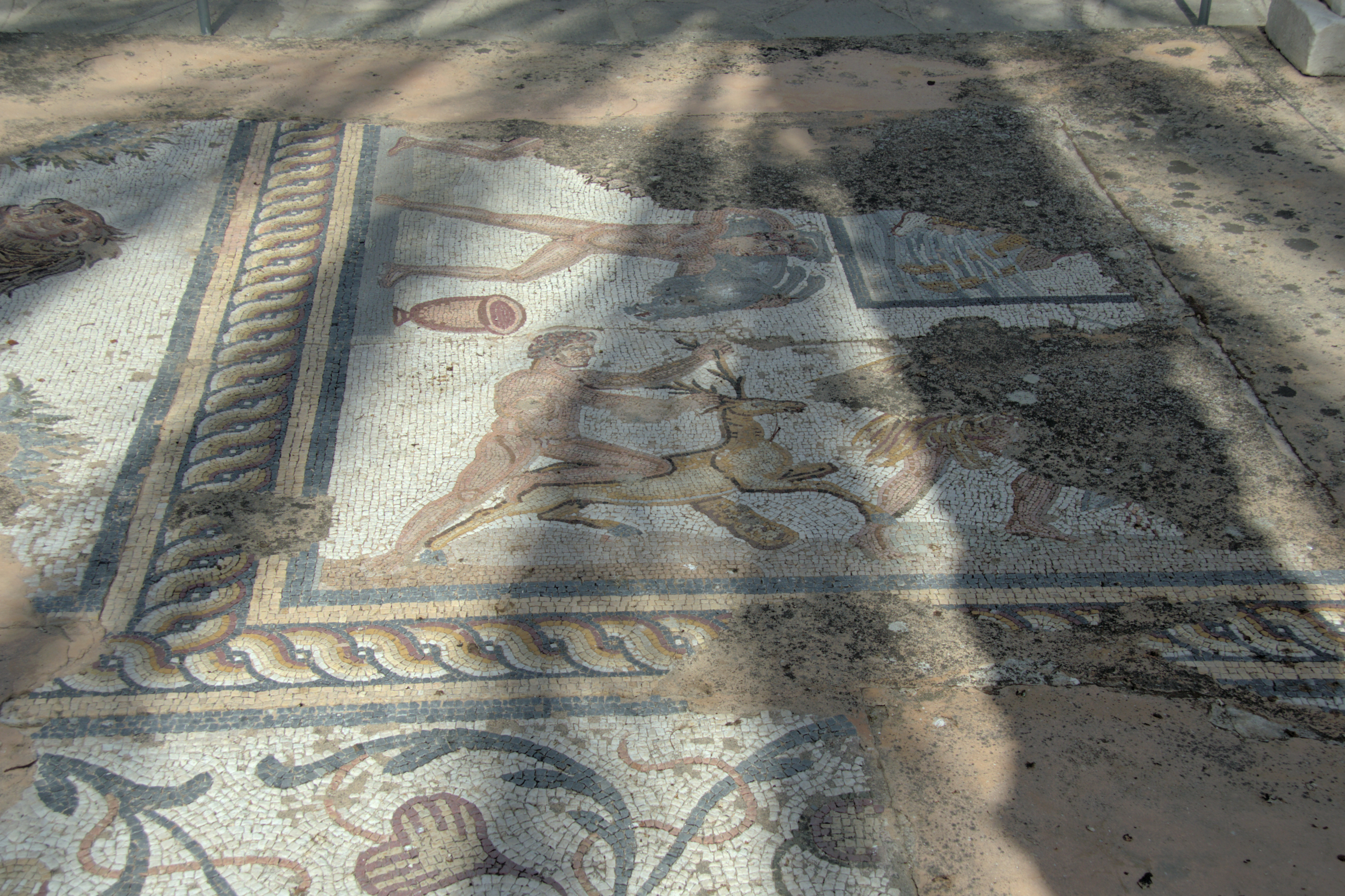
Mosaic depicting the Labours of Herakles, 3rd century AD

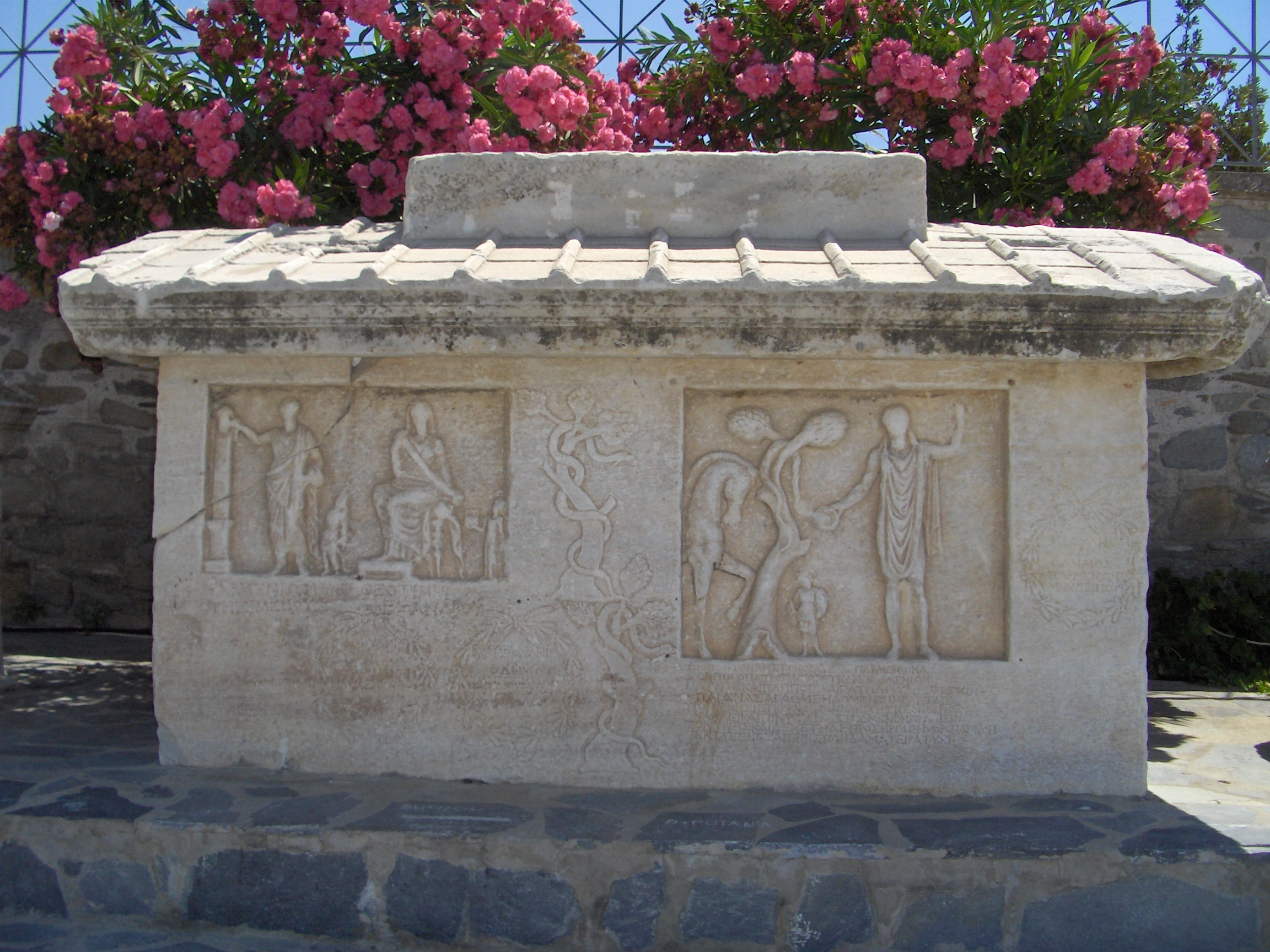
Hellenistic sarcophagus

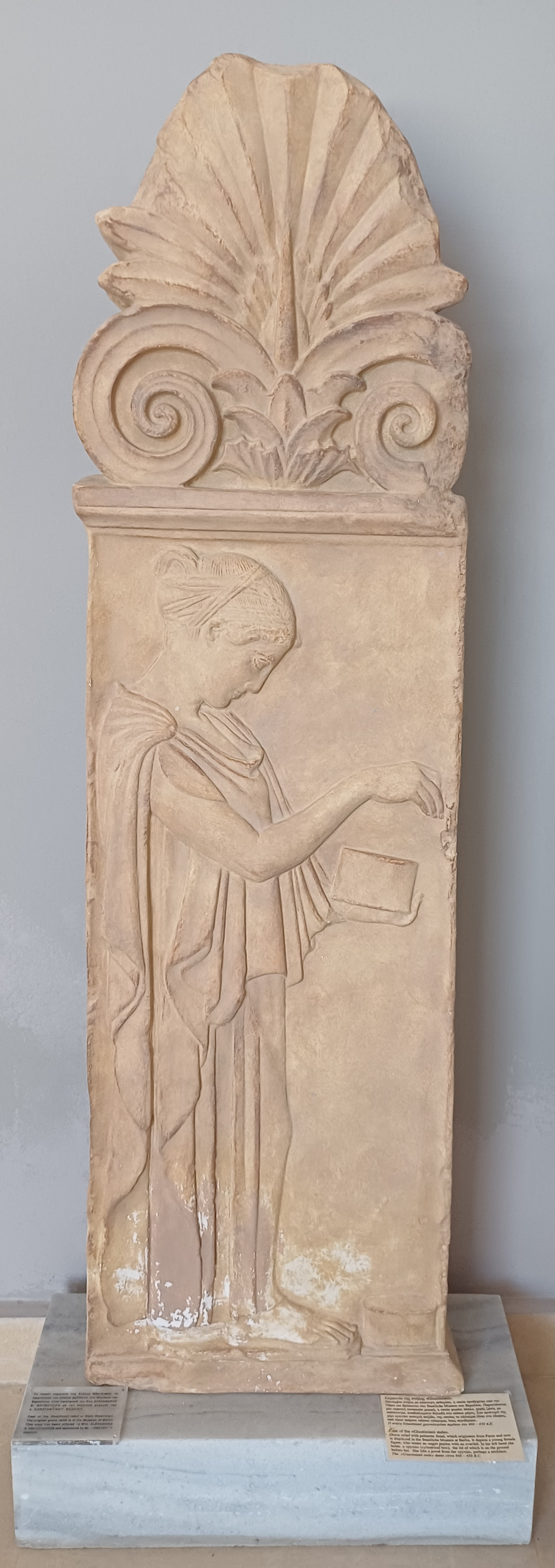
Funerary relief of a girl, c. 460 BC

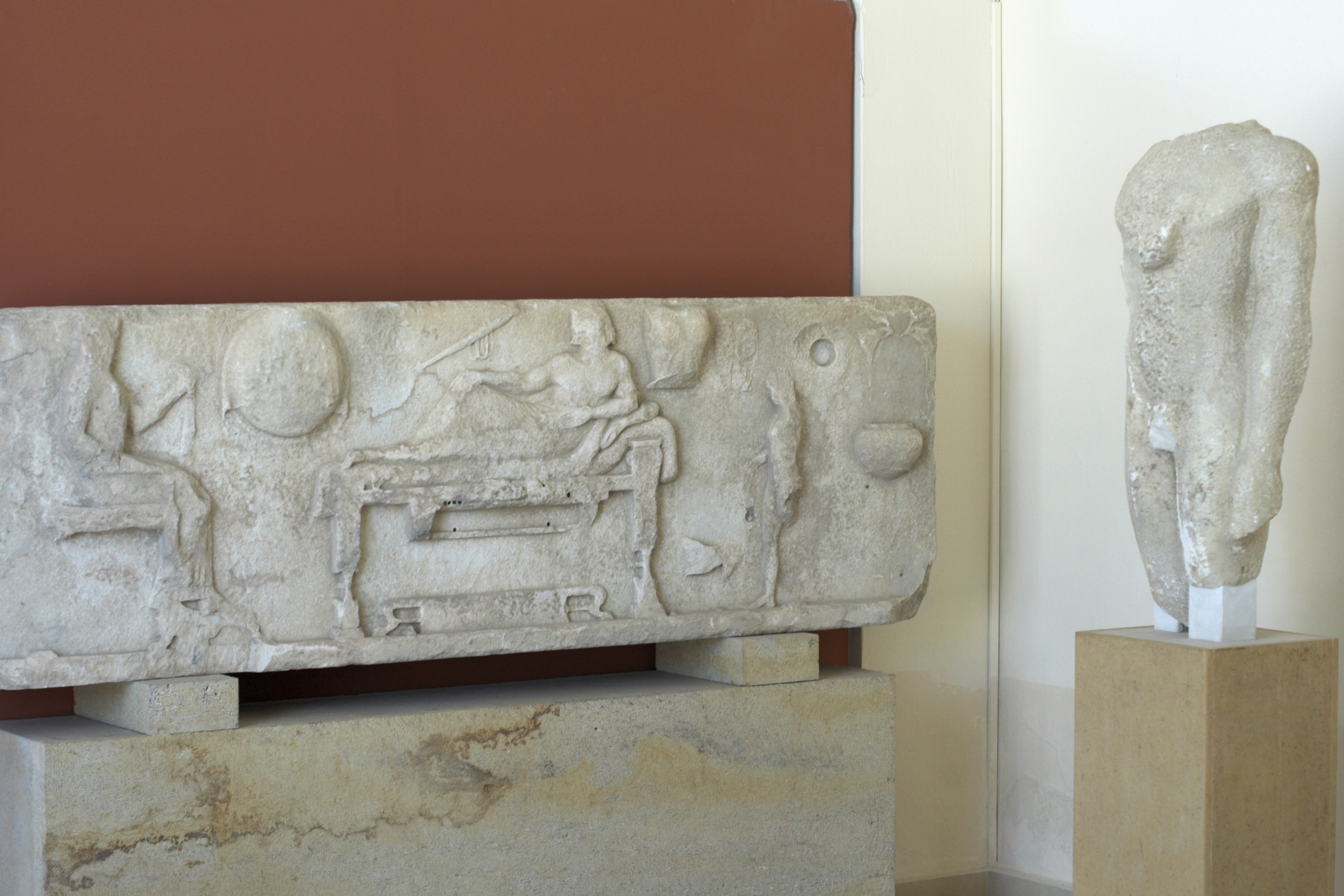
Marble relief stele depicting Archilochos, his wife, and a boy, c.500 BC.

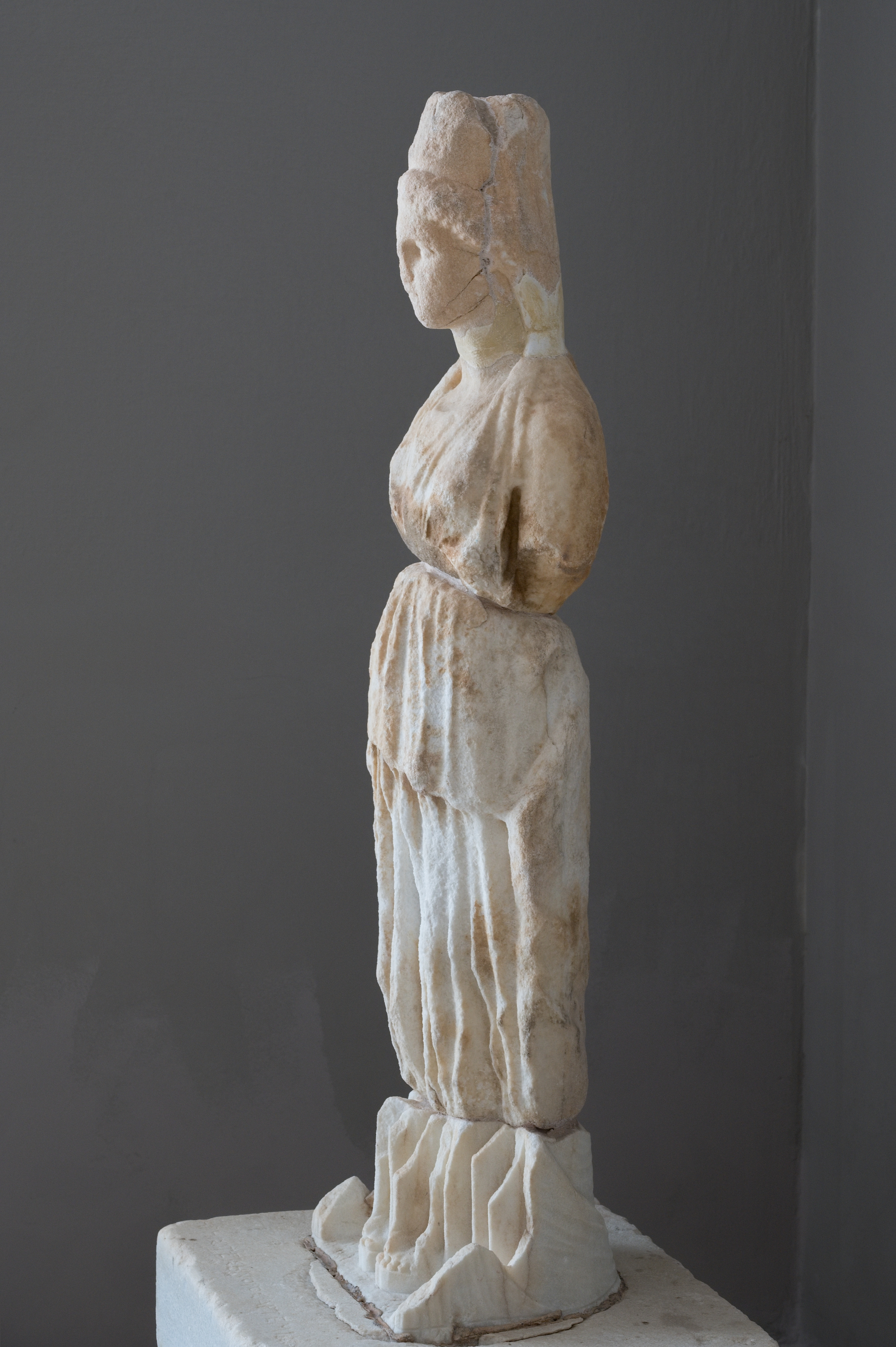
Statue of Artemis from the sanctuary of Artemis in the Parian Delion, c. 360 BC

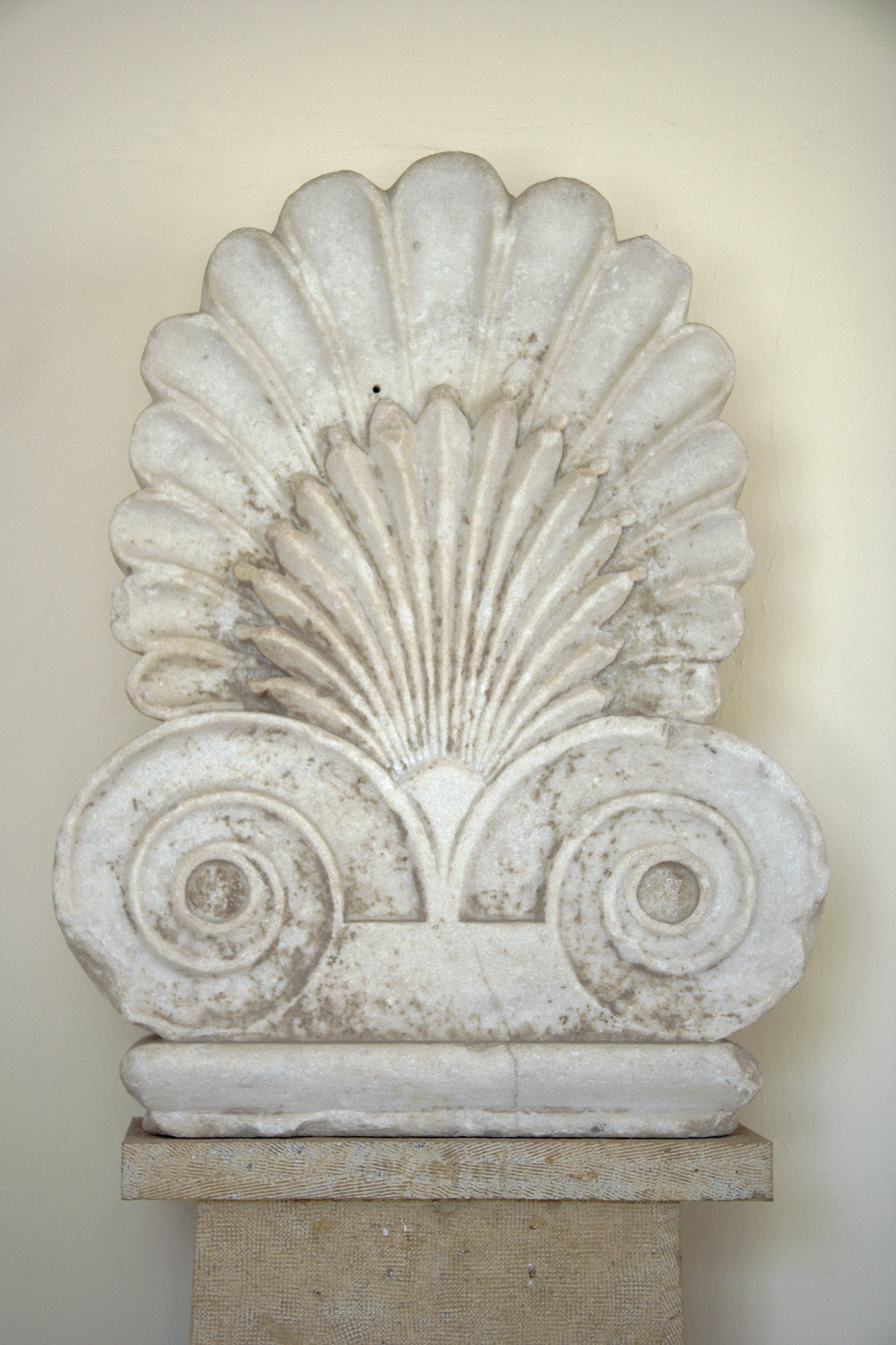
Marble relief of a palmette

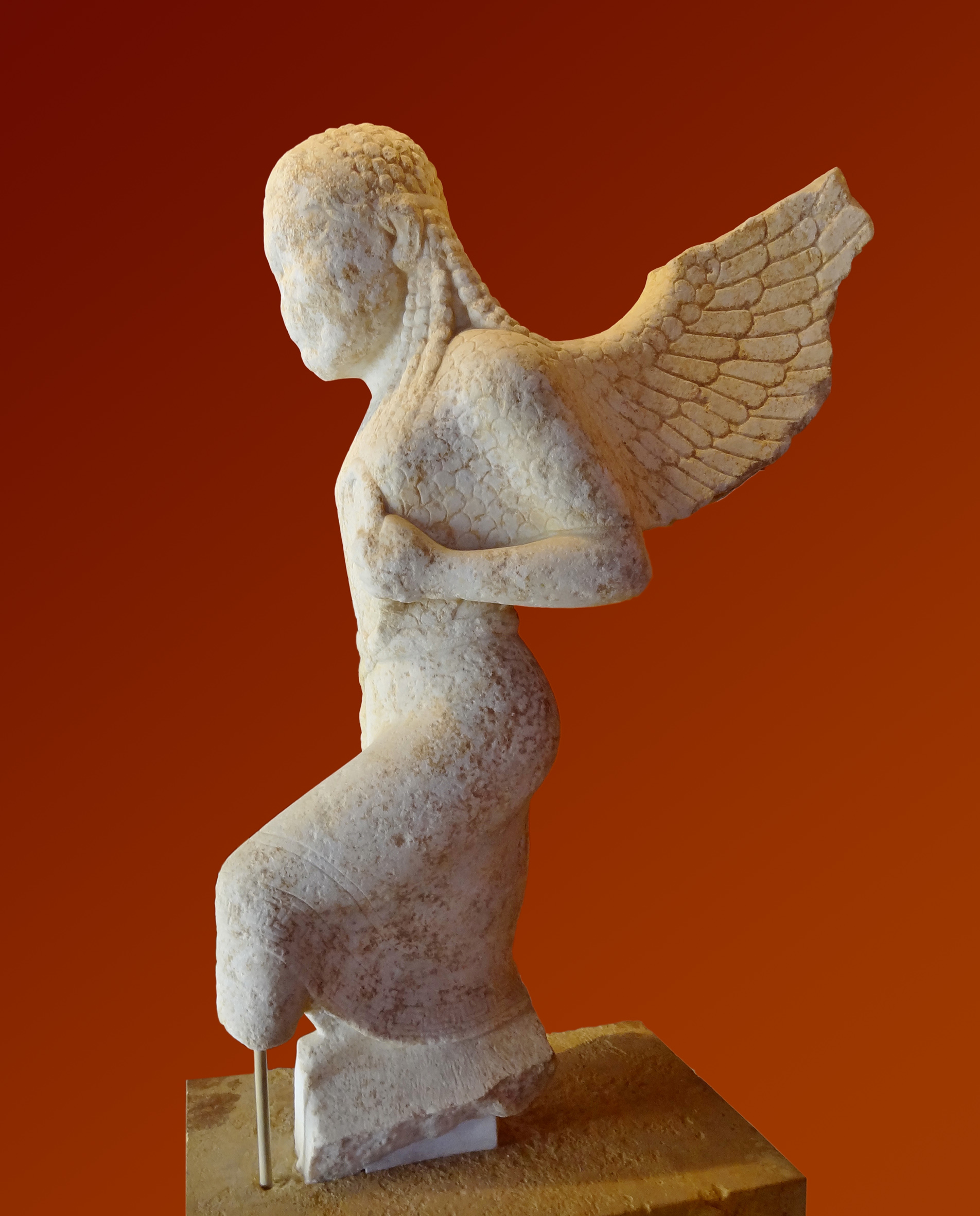
Gorgon of Paros, middle of the 6th century BC

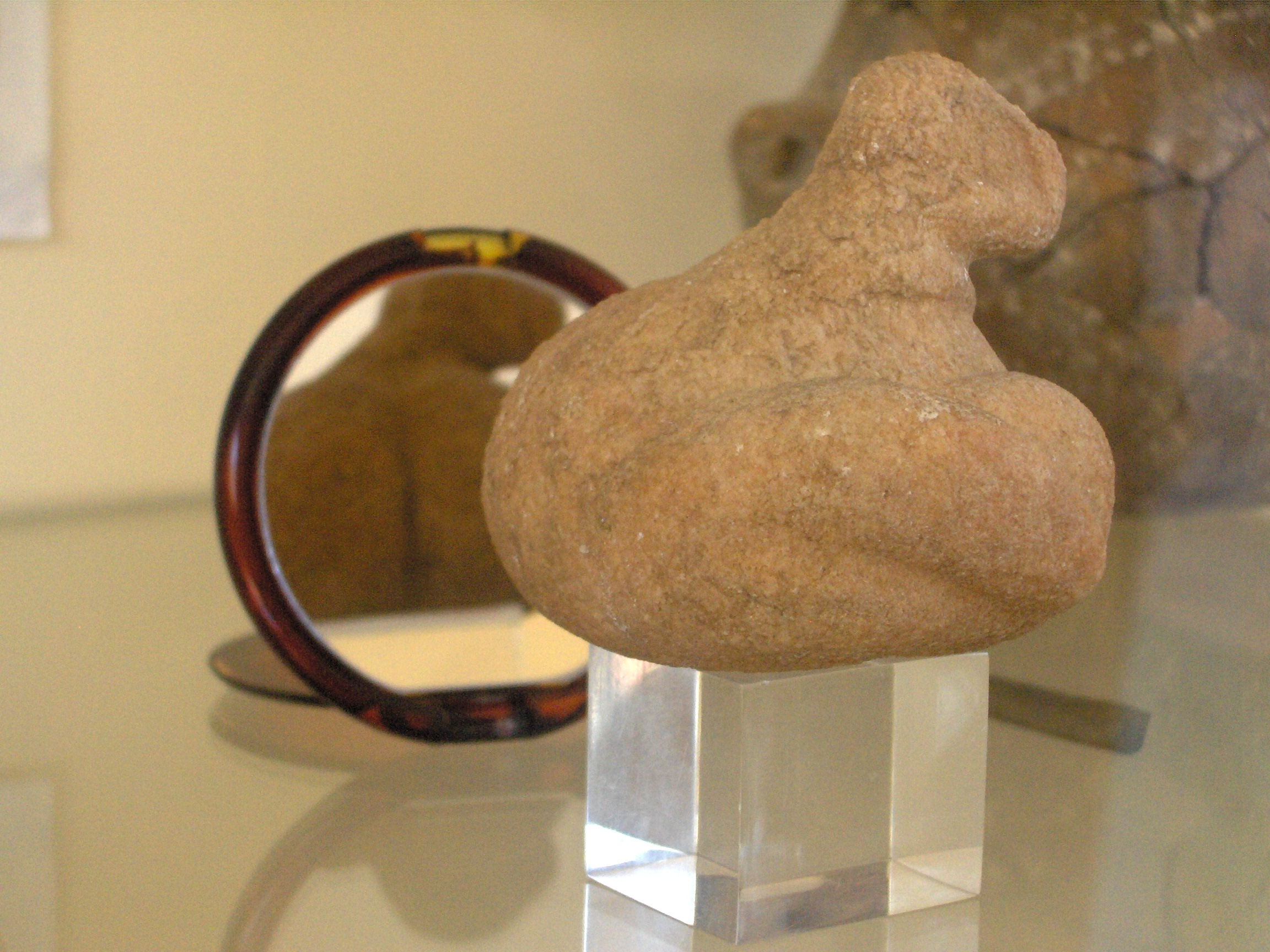
Fat Lady of Saliagos, the oldest known Cycladic figurine, c. 5000-4000 BC

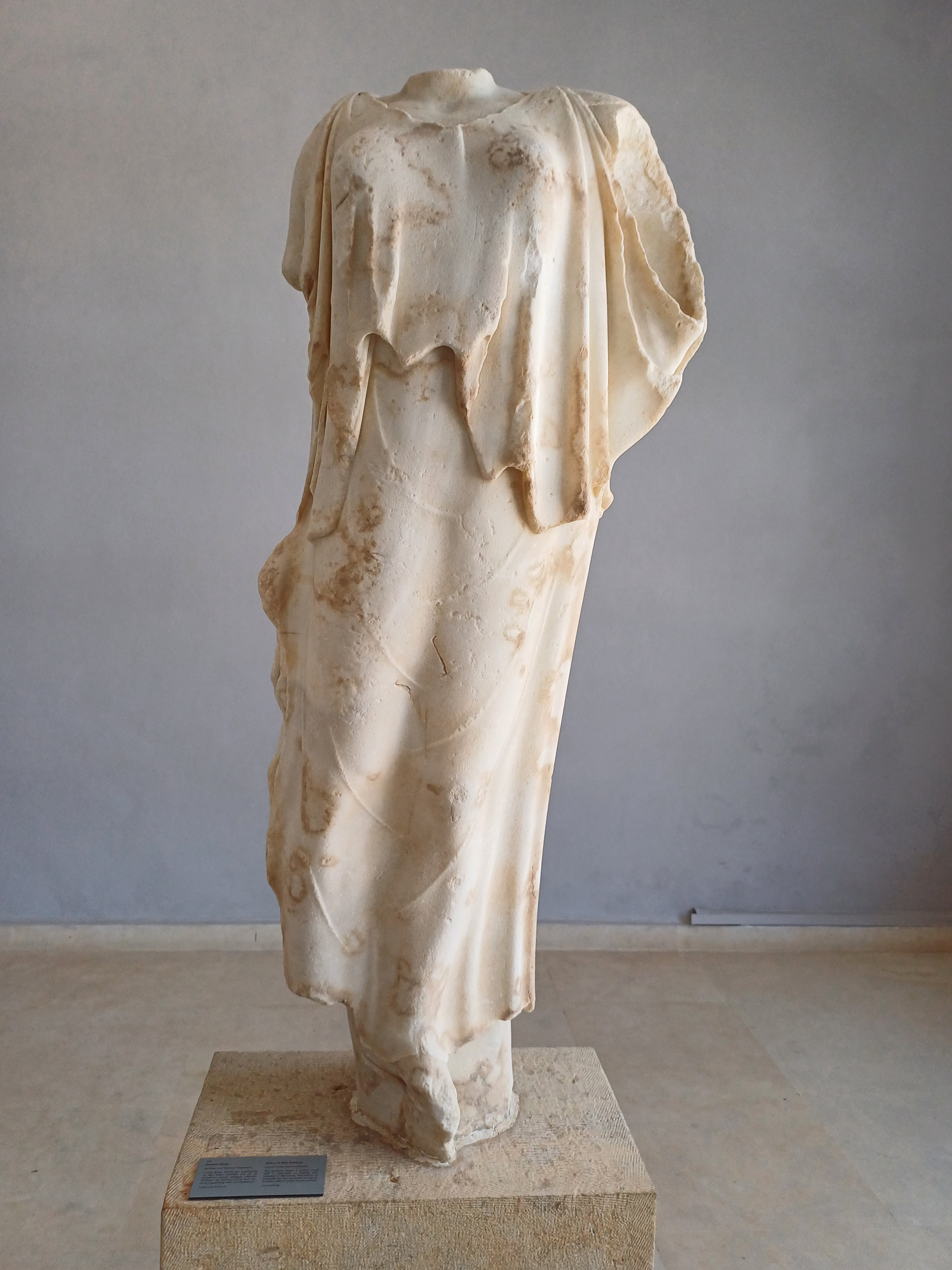
Nike of Paros, c. 480 BC

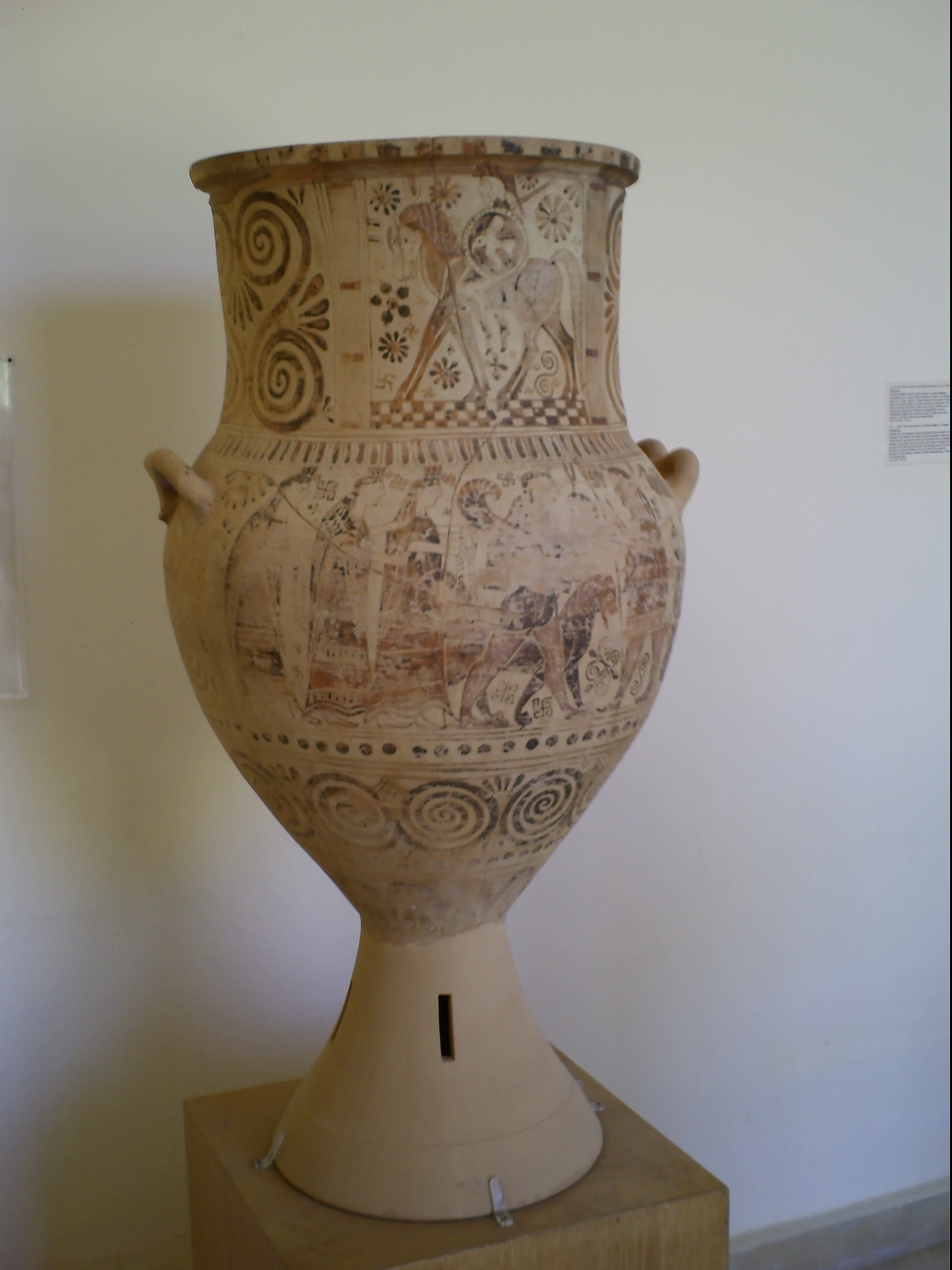
Large amphora, c. 7th century BC

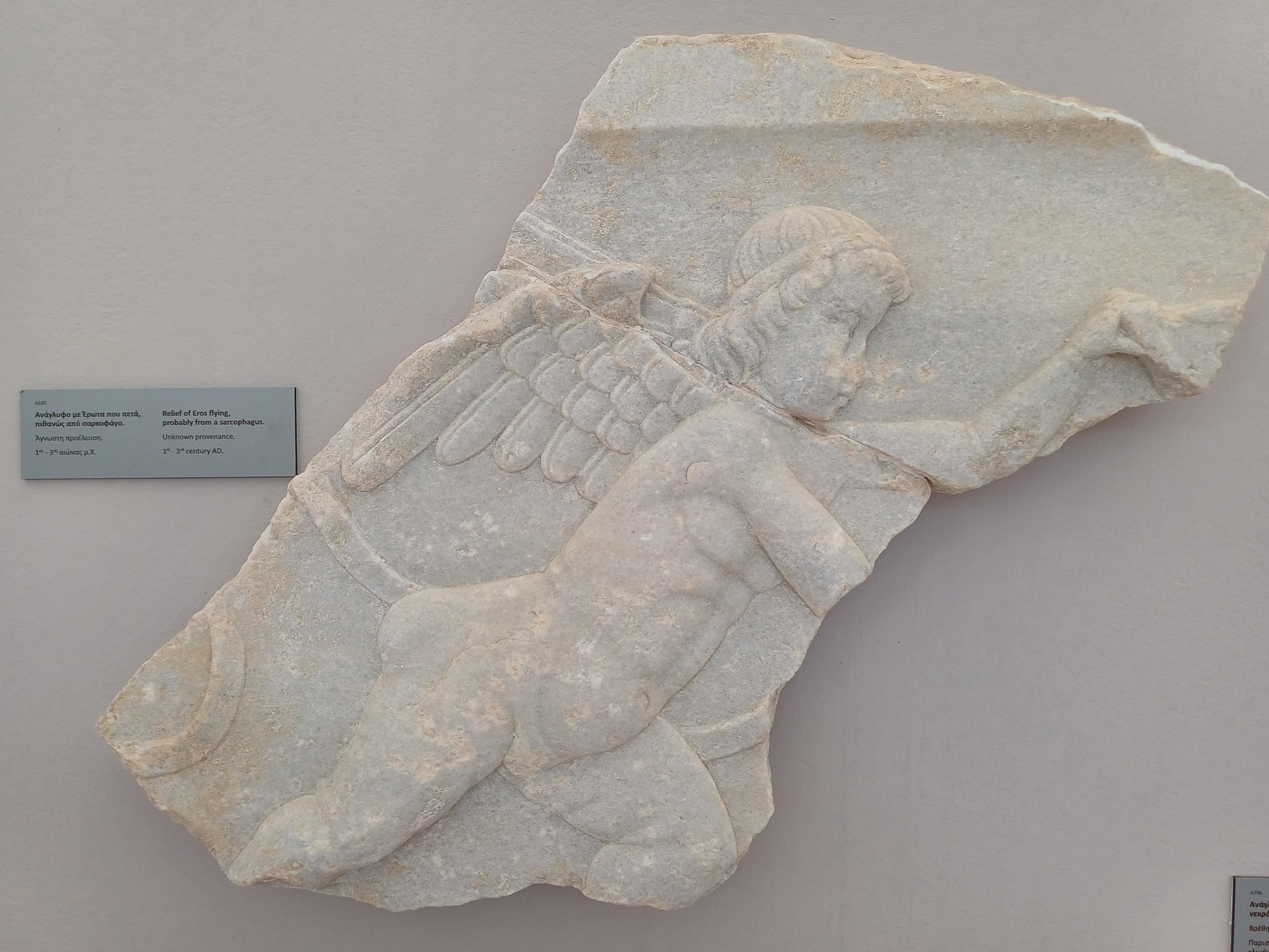
Marble relief of Eros flying, possibly from a sarcophagus, 1st to 3rd century AD

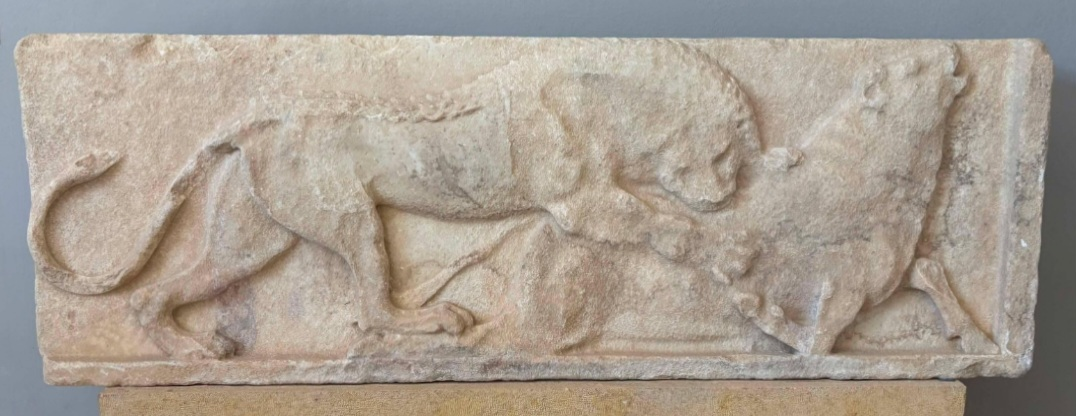
Marble relief of a lion devouring a bull, c. 500 BC

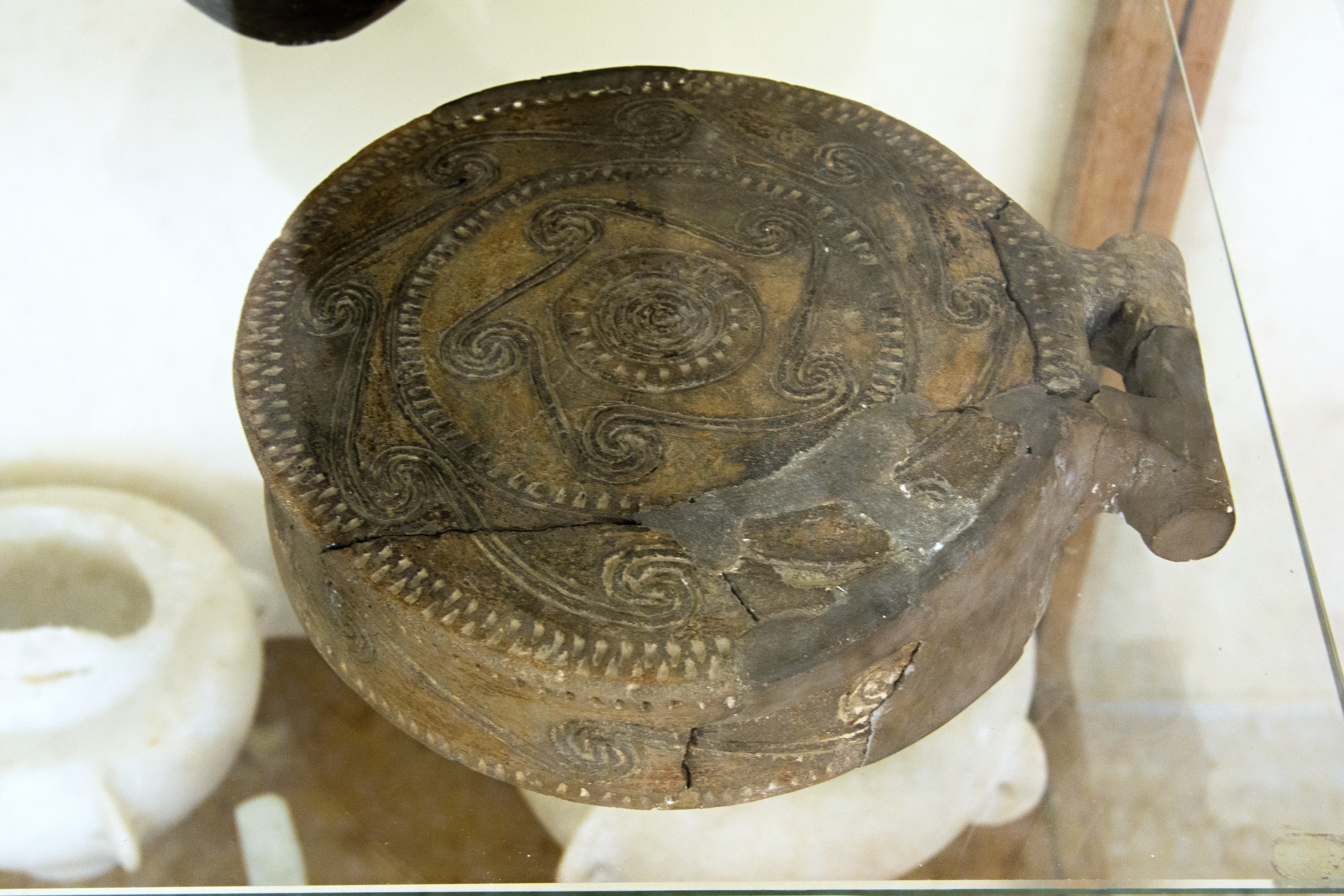
Cycladian Frying Pan

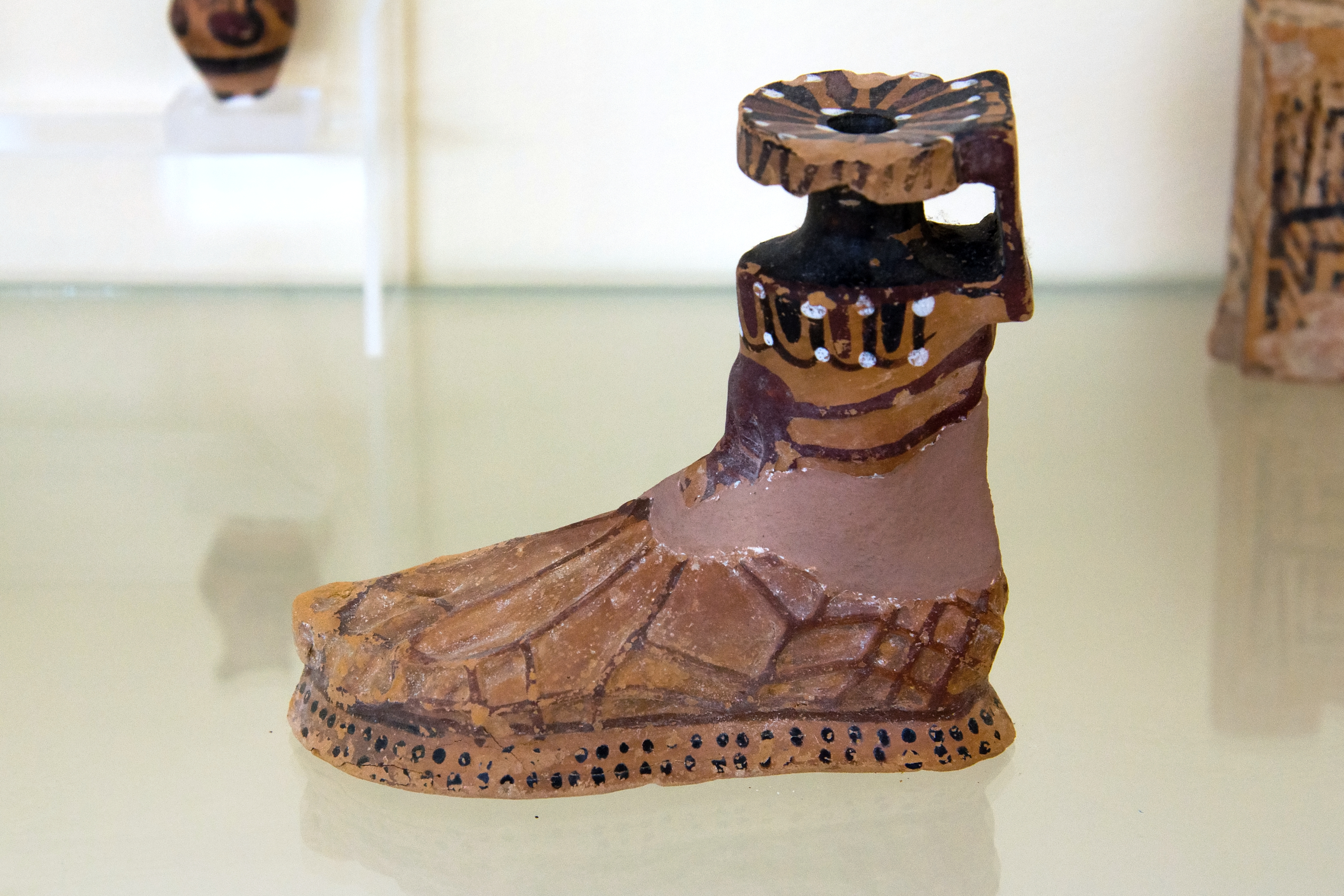
Vessel in the shape of a shoe, c. 650-600 BC.

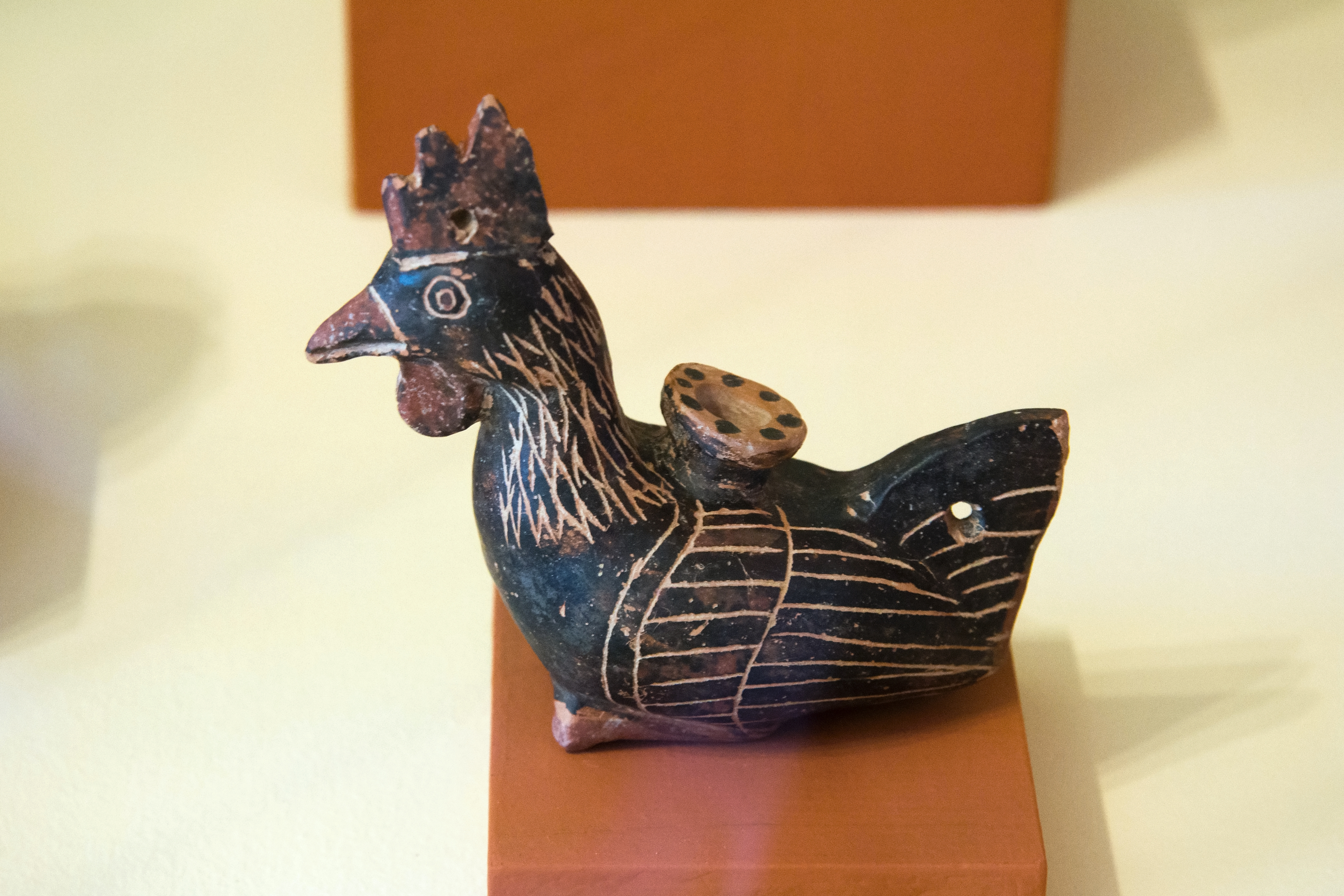
Imported Corinthian vessel in the shape of a rooster, c. 600 BC
