= Saliagos =

Islet in the Cyclades, Greece

Σάλιαγκος
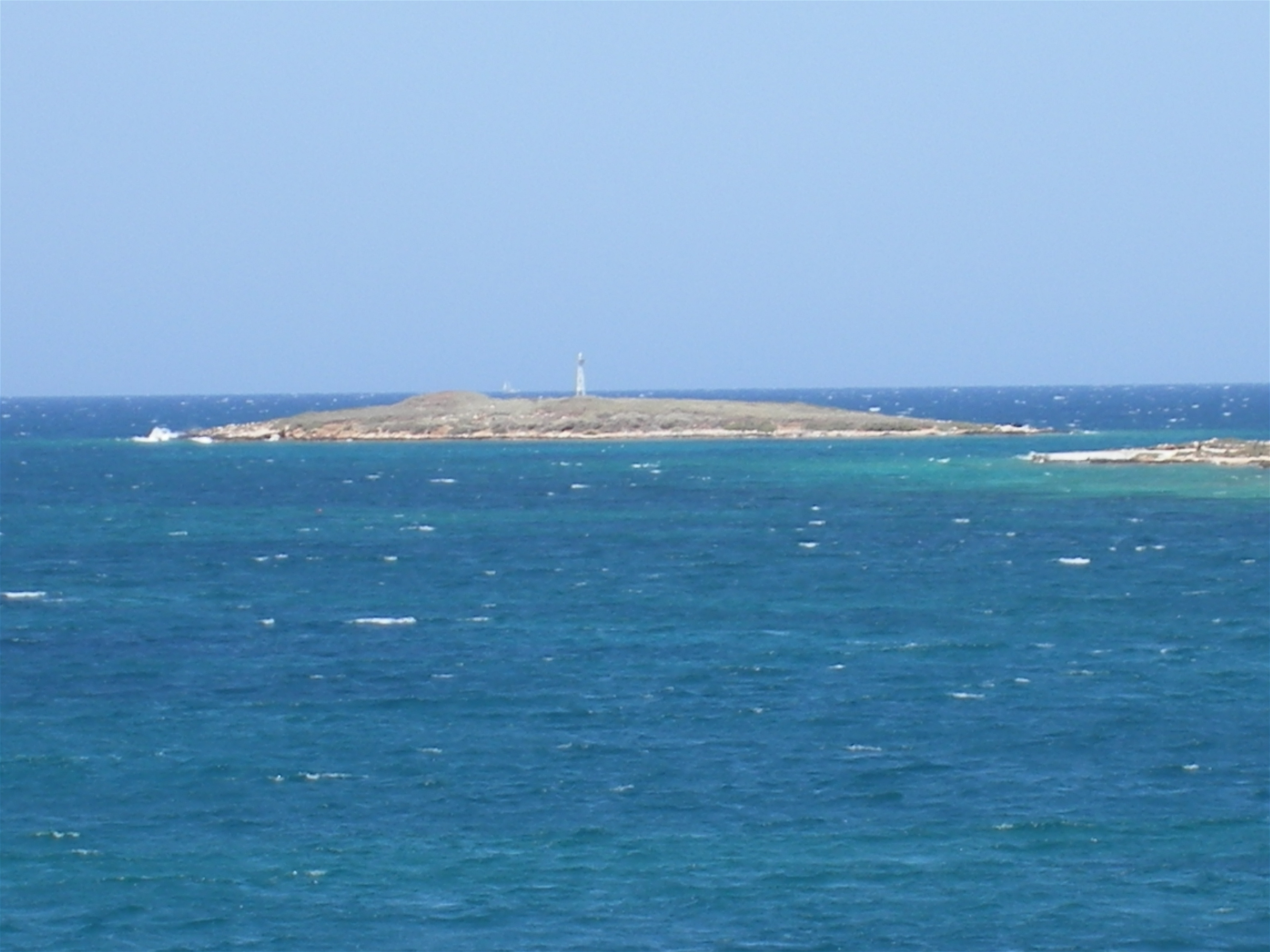
- Saliagos islet
- Interactive map of Saliagos

Geography
- Coordinates: 37.048°N 25.094°E
- Archipelago: Cyclades
- Adjacent to: South Aegean

Administration
- Greece

Demographics
- Languages: Greek

Saliagos (Greek: Σάλιαγκος) is an islet in the Greek island group of Cyclades. It is the first early farming site and one of the oldest settlements of the Cycladic culture.

The settlement is dated to the middle to late Neolithic period. Radiocarbon dating has indicated a period from 5000 to 4500 BC. The site was excavated during the years 1964-65 by John Davies Evans and Colin Renfrew from the British School at Athens.

== Location ==
Saliagos is only 70-110 meters in area and is situated between Antiparos (ancient Oliaros) and Paros and surrounded by other small, uninhabited islands. The islands are all that remains of a land link that once existed between Antiparos and Paros. This land link existed as late as the Byzantine period but has since been submerged by rising sea levels.

It is estimated that the settlement here was inhabited for about 300 years. The site also has one of the earliest fortification systems in Greece.

== Ceramics ==
The ceramic vessels found are made of local clay; about 12% have smoothed surfaces and are interpreted as tableware. Several closed pitchers or jugs have been found; the other items are open bowls and plates. The colour of the clay varies from yellow and shades of brown to dark gray, with the majority of the vessels featuring matt white markings. The patterns are geometric but show a wide variation of decorations. A few pieces are decorated with indented patterns or attached knobs. The ceramic styles show kinship with those of the mainland, and not so much with other Neolithic sites on the islands.

== Use of marble ==
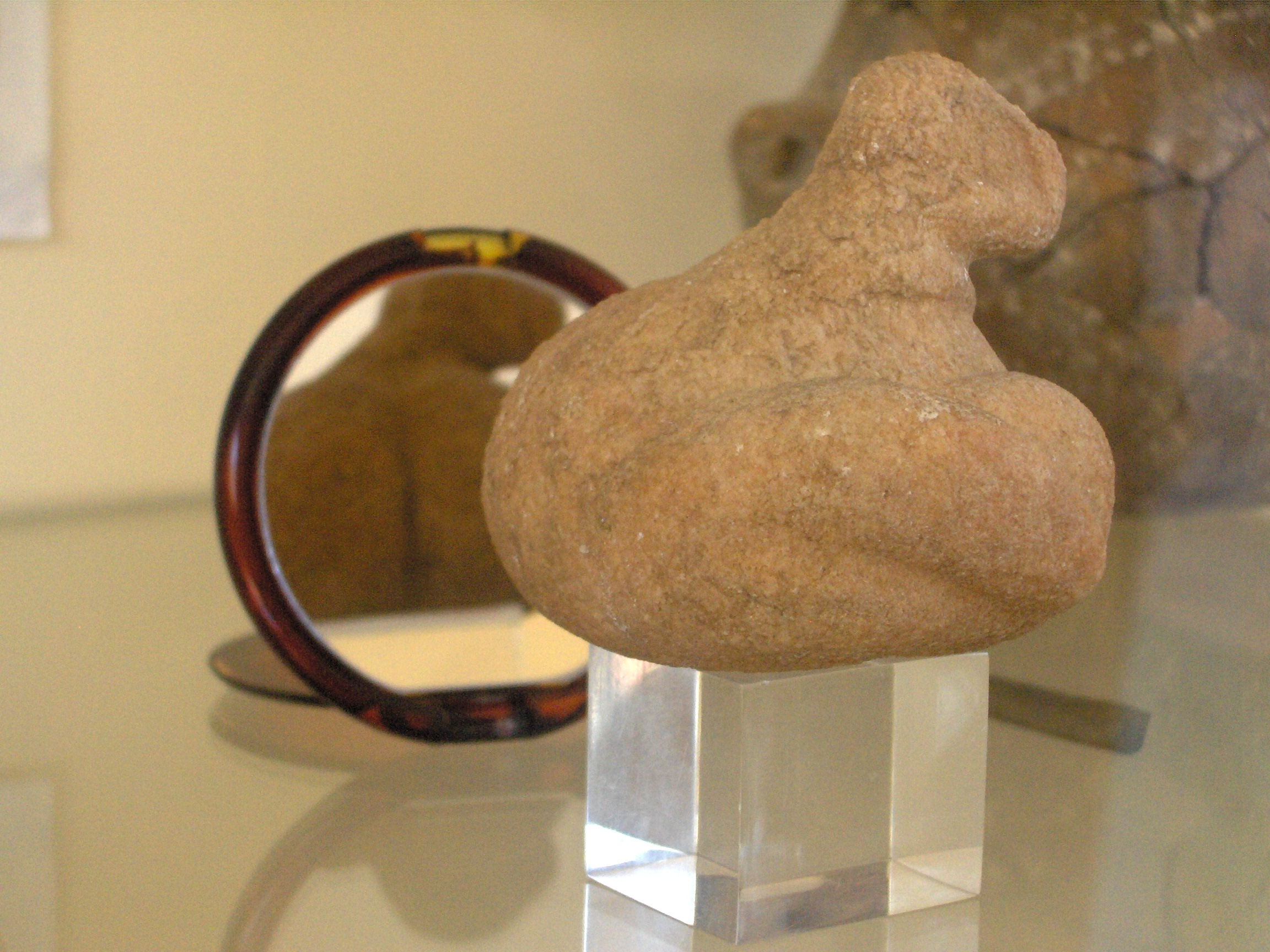
The fat lady of Saliagos.

Three early Cycladic figurines made of marble were found. One of them is designated as a fertility symbol in the form of a voluptuous female figure with crossed legs. The figure bears similarities, on the one hand, to a find in Sangri on Naxos and, on the other hand, to standing clay figures found in mainland Greece, the Peloponnese, Thessaly and Macedonia. A male figurine from Knossos on Crete from the same period was also made of marble. They all date from the 6th millennium BC. The style of the Saliagos female figurine has no known successors.

Two other idol figurines are much more abstract and are reminiscent of the shape of a violin. They have no recognizable predecessors, and their relationship to the abstract idols of the Cycladic Bronze Age is unmistakable.

== Obsidian ==
A very large number and wide variety of obsidian tools were found on Saliagos. There were more than 25,000 artefacts found, including over 1,100 blades. The obsidian tools are scrapers, spikes, and blades. The obsidian projectile tips are interpreted as parts of harpoons, rather than arrows.

The tools were made on the island, itself; the obsidian used came almost exclusively from the island of Milos, 60 km away, but also occasionally from Gyali in the Dodecanese, which indicates trade connections of almost 200 km in distance.

== Lifeways ==
Bone finds allow an insight into the dietary habits of the Stone Age inhabitants. Tuna predominated in their diets, although this fish is no longer regularly found in this part of the Aegean. Sheep and goats, and to a lesser extent cattle and pigs, provided the residents with meat, wool and milk. Emmer and barley have been detected in their diet.

The burial sites of the settlement have sunk under the sea, so no grave finds could be discovered.

Culturally, Saliagos stands out from the environment in the Neolithic period. There are only scattered traces of similar human activity on some other islands as well, and small amounts of similar pottery have also been found on the neighboring island of Naxos. Individual surface finds in Mavrispilia on Mykonos, Vouni on Antiparos and Agrilia in Melos are more closely related to Saliagos.

For a long time, Saliagos was the only Neolithic settlement in the Aegean Islands with recorded farming. Yet in 1995, Ftelia, a similar settlement on Mykonos, was excavated, which is now recognized as the second settlement of the Saliagos culture.

Ftelia appears to represent an even earlier archaeological culture than Saliagos.
