= Cycladic frying pan =

Bronze Age artifacts from the Aegean Islands

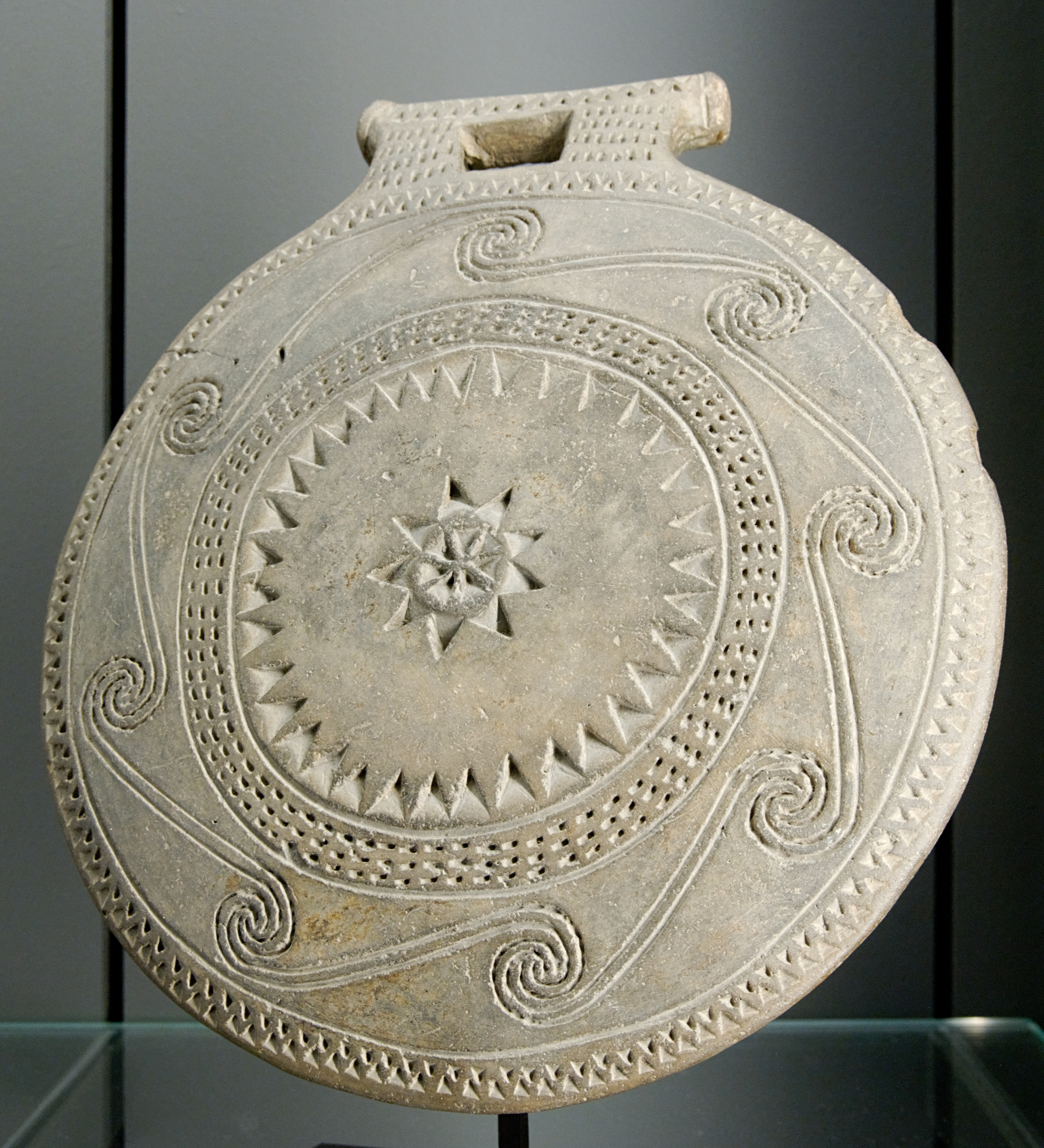
"Frying pan" with running spiral decoration, Early Cycladic I–II (ca. 2700 BC). From Syros?

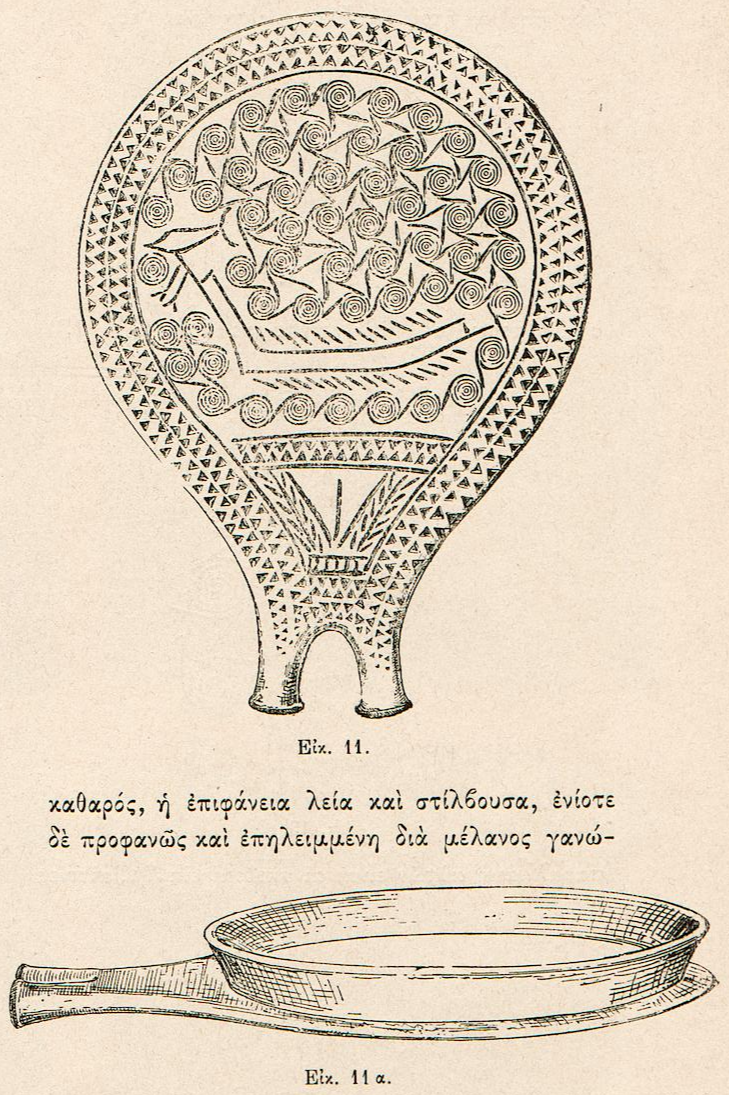
Frying pan (NAMA 4974) from the National Archaeological Museum Athens, drawing by Christos Tsountas in 1899

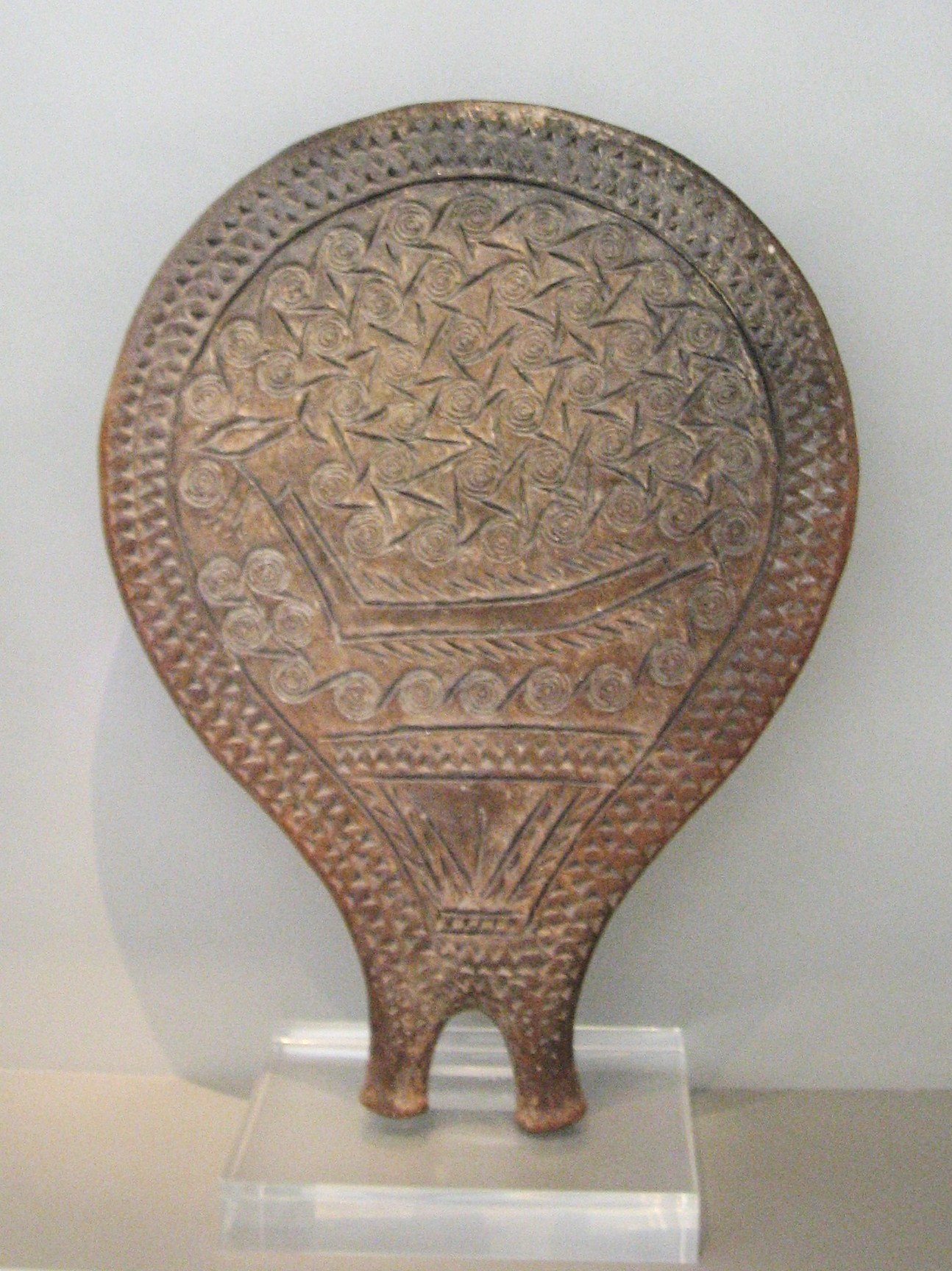
The same frying pan with incised decoration of a ship. Early Cycladic II, Chalandriani, Syros (Keros-Syros culture, 2800–2300 BC)

A frying pan is a type of Early Cycladic II artifact made in the Aegean Islands between c. 2700 and c. 2200 BCE. They are flat circular disks with a "handle", and usually made from earthenware, but sometimes stone (Frying pan (Karlsruhe 75/11) is an example). They are found especially in sites from the Cycladic Grotta-Pelos and Keros-Syros cultures. Their purpose remains unknown, although they are usually interpreted as prestige goods.

One side is usually undecorated, and the main zone is surrounded by a raised rim; this is usually regarded as the top side. The other side, regarded as the reverse, is usually slightly wider and highly decorated by incision in the clay, evidently with considerable care, and sometimes using wooden stamps for repeated motifs.

They have been found at sites throughout the Aegean but are not common: around 200 have been unearthed to date, all but a handful in pottery. They are usually found in graves, although they are very uncommon grave goods; the rarity of these objects has contributed to the difficulty in identifying their true purpose.

== Description ==
Frying pans typically resemble skillets (hence the name frying pan) in that they have a diameter of 20 to 28 cm (7.9 to 11 in), a raised lip and a handle. However, all the decoration tends to be on the outside rim and on the base. The decoration is stamped or incised. The motifs are mostly geometrical, with some vegetal or fish designs. Boats with oars are sometimes represented. The handles vary a great deal (more so on the mainland).

Two types of "frying pans" are distinguished. One the so-called "Kampos type" is Early Cycladic, characteristically with its straight side decorated with incised lines framing spirals; its rectangular handle with a crossbar; the main circular field commonly decorated with incised running spirals around a central star (ref. Dartmouth). The other is the "Syros type" with a concave undecorated side, and a two-pronged handle; decoration of main circular field with stamped concentric circles or spirals, often accompanied by incised depictions of longboats or what is sometimes interpreted as female genitalia.

Common patterns and designs on these "frying pans" include:

- large stars with circles or bands inside
- triangular patterns in rows (very common, called kerbschnitt)
- concentric circles
- wheel-like patterns
- many small spirals grouped together
- ships (with paddles and fish banners)

== Proposed functions ==
Proposed functions of "frying pans" vary widely, but some of the more common theories include scrying mirrors, home decorative item, drums, religious objects, or salt pans. No "frying pan" found yet shows any physical wear from being used as a cooking utensil (ex: an actual frying pan).

The plate interpretation is fairly neutral, as a plate could be anything from a decorative object to a religious one. It is unlikely that they are actual cooking utensils, as there is no signs of food or fire, and they are usually found in burial contexts. The drum theory is unlikely as one would expect a drum to have holes around the edges so that the hide could be stretched across it. Furthermore, with many of the handles found on these objects, it would be very hard for the drummer to hold the artifact in the style suggested.

Prehistoric mirrors often have decorated backs, but are usually bronze mirrors or made of other reflective materials, although proponents of the mirror theory suggest that filled with water or oil, these objects could function as mirrors. A 2009 study concluded, via experimentation, that the frying pans work effectively as mirrors when filled water or olive oil. The use of olive oil was found to be particularly effective, especially if the oil is darkened with pigment. Olive oil is generally believed to have been too rare and expensive to be used for this purpose in the early Cycladic period, though recent discoveries on the island of Keros of a large pyramid, complex plumbing systems, and highly advanced metallurgy suggest that olive oil may not have been as rare as was once believed.

It remains undetermined if they served some symbolic or religious purpose, but their presence in graves suggest they could have. Given the frequent depiction of female genitalia, it has been suggested that they could have been receptacles for libations as part of some kind of fertility rite.

A further possibility was raised by Christos Doumas in 1993, who suggested that they were used to process sea salt. Doumas connected the issue of trade and exchange of goods before the invention of money with this, proposing that salt might have served as a valuable material, while leaving no archaeologically detectable traces.

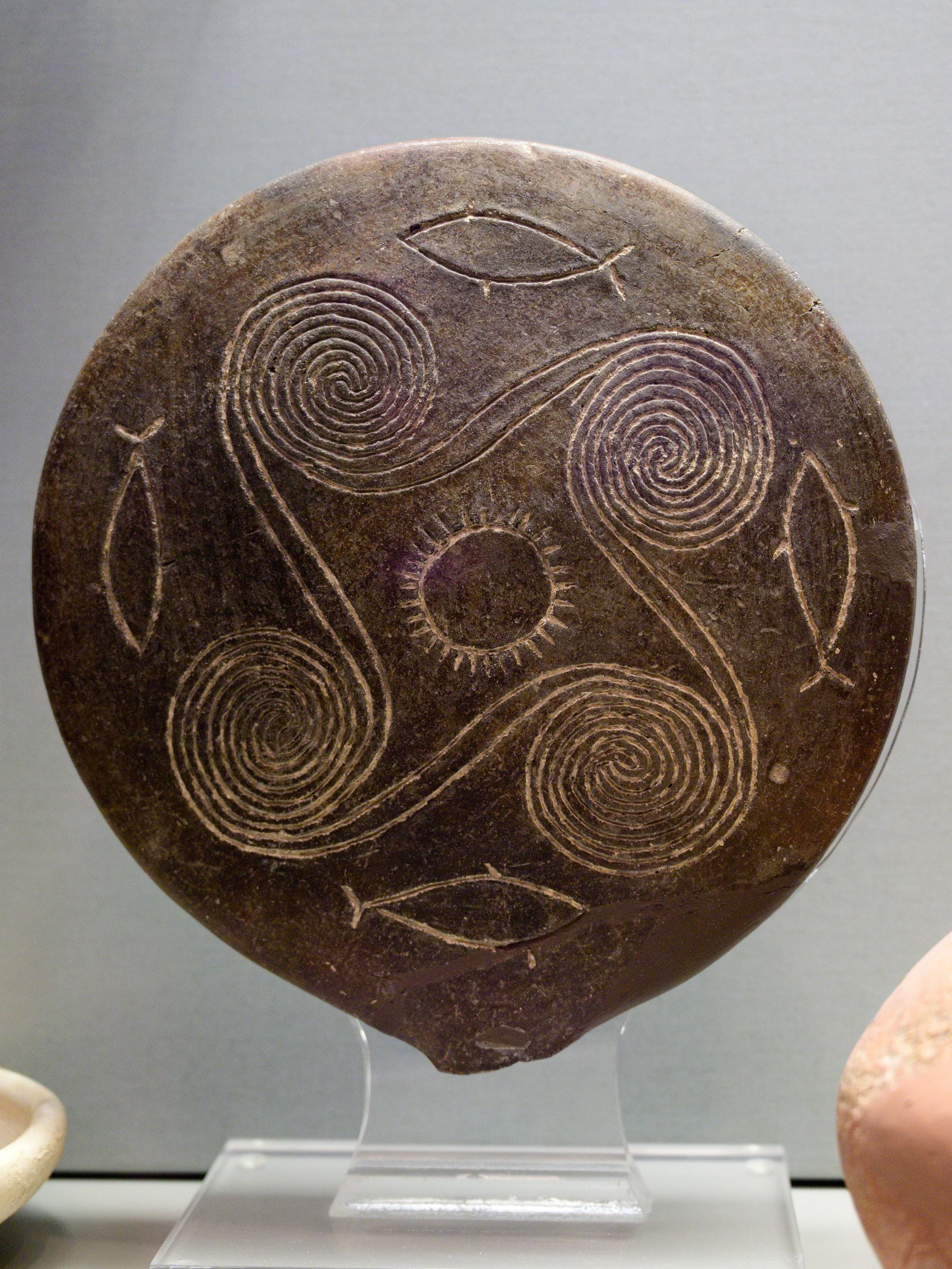
NAMA 6140.4, 2800-2700 BCE, Louros, Naxos

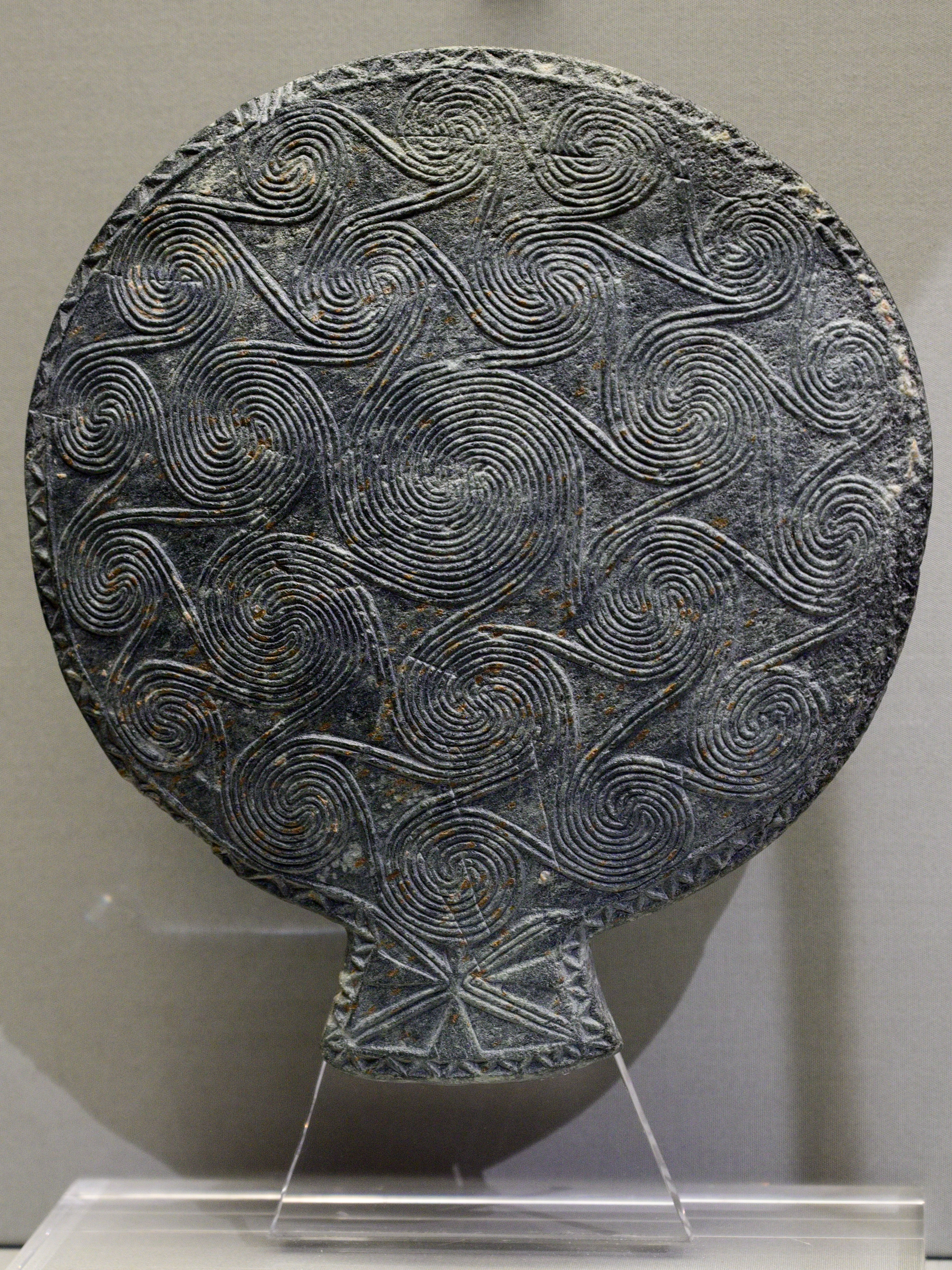
Example in steatite (stone, rather than earthenware), perhaps from Naxos. NAMA 2093, repatriated from Germany in 2014

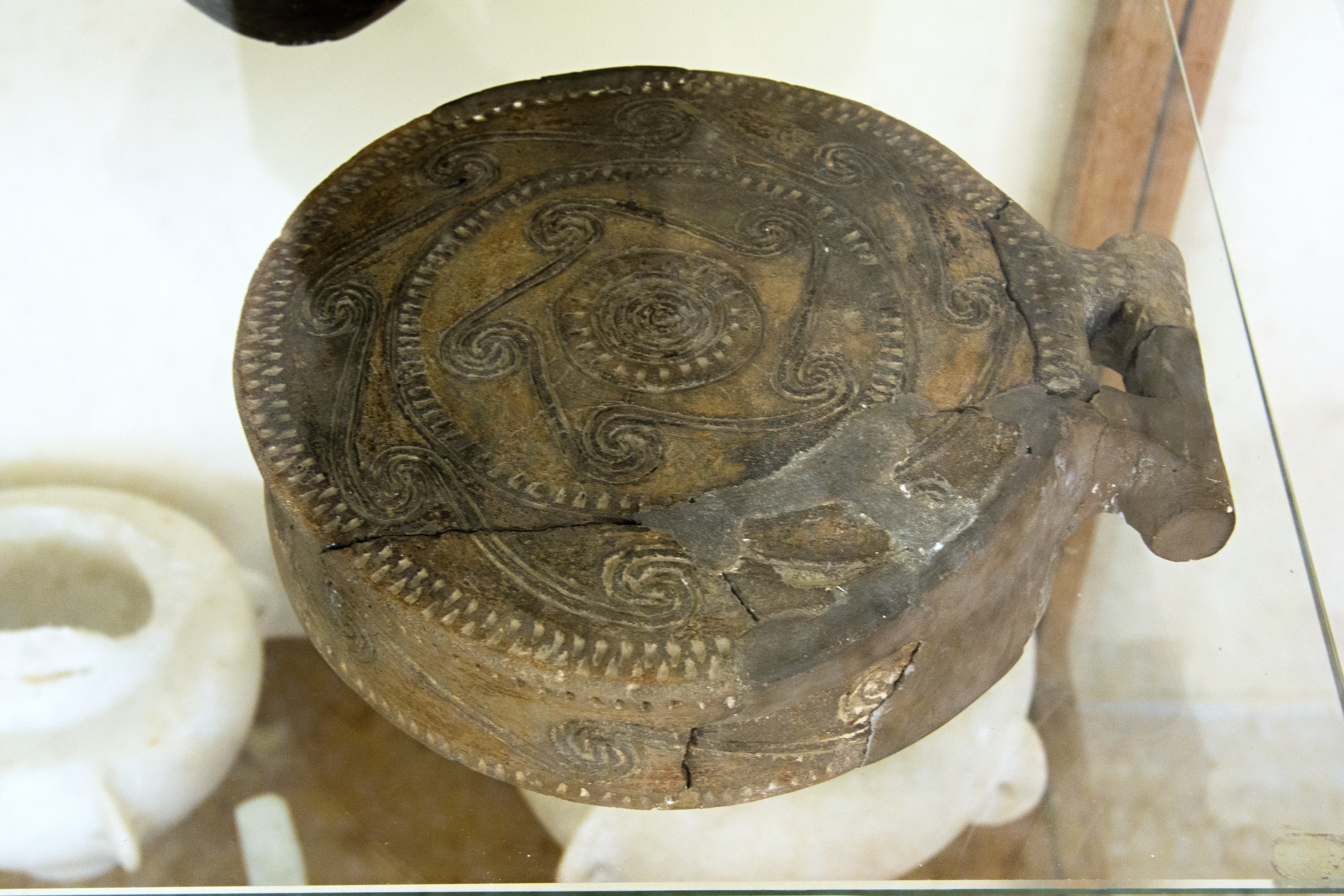
Frying pan (Paros 2136)

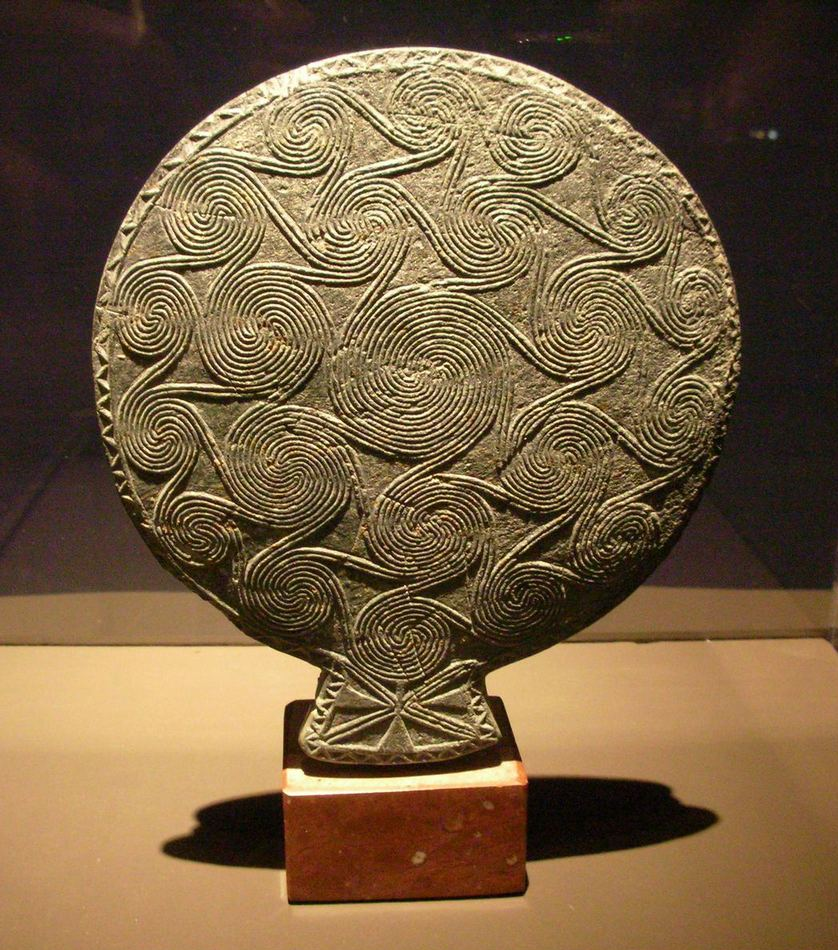
NAMA 20935 (formerly Karlsruhe, returned to Greece in 2014)

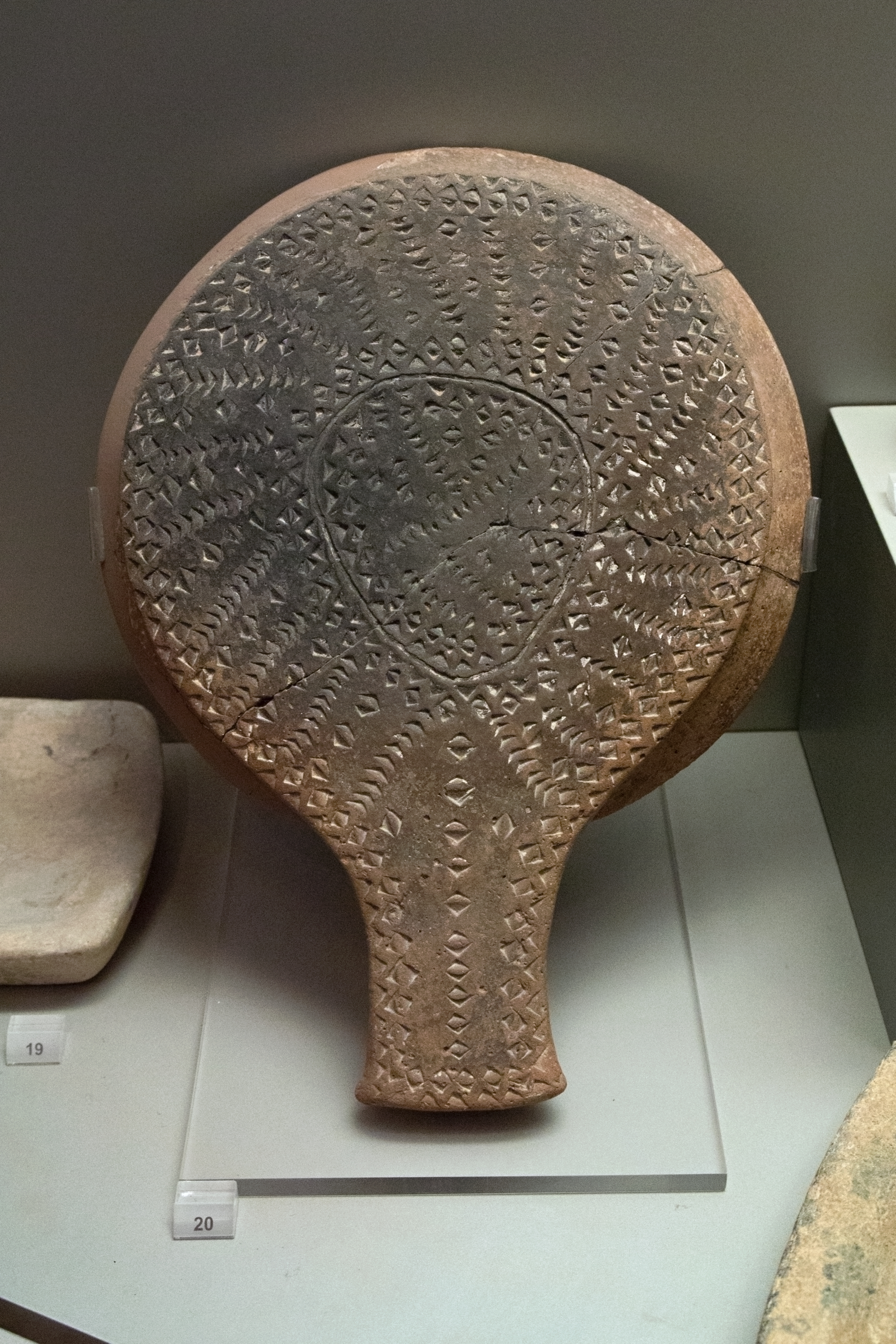
NAMA 5012
