= Frying pan (disambiguation) =

A frying pan is a pan used for cooking, also known as a skillet.

Frying pan may also refer to:

== Places ==
- Frying Pan, North Carolina, an unincorporated community in Tyrell County, North Carolina
- Frying Pan Farm Park, a park in Fairfax County, Virginia
- Frying Pan Shoals, off the coast of Cape Fear, North Carolina
  - The shoals are the namesake of Lightship Frying Pan - Now a restaurant docked in the Hudson River, New York City.
- Fryingpan Glacier, on Mount Rainier in the state of Washington
- Fryingpan River, in Colorado

== Other uses ==
- Frying Pan (guitar), an early guitar
- Frying pans, Bronze Age Cycladic archaeological artifacts found in the Aegean Islands, including:
  - Frying pan (Karlsruhe 75/11), stone, at the National Archaeological Museum of Athens, Greece
  - Frying pan (NAMA 4974), ceramic, at the National Archaeological Museum of Athens, Greece
  - Frying pan (Paros 2136), ceramic, at the National Archaeological Museum of Athens, Greece
- Frying pans (flower), Eschscholzia lobbii, a species of poppy
- "The Frying Pan", an informal Australian name for the constellation Chamaeleon
- "Frying Pan", a 1995 song by The Urge from the album Receiving the Gift of Flavor

== See also ==
- Fry (disambiguation), for other uses of "fry" or "frying"
