= Frying pan (Paros 2136) =

Bronze Age Cycladic artifact

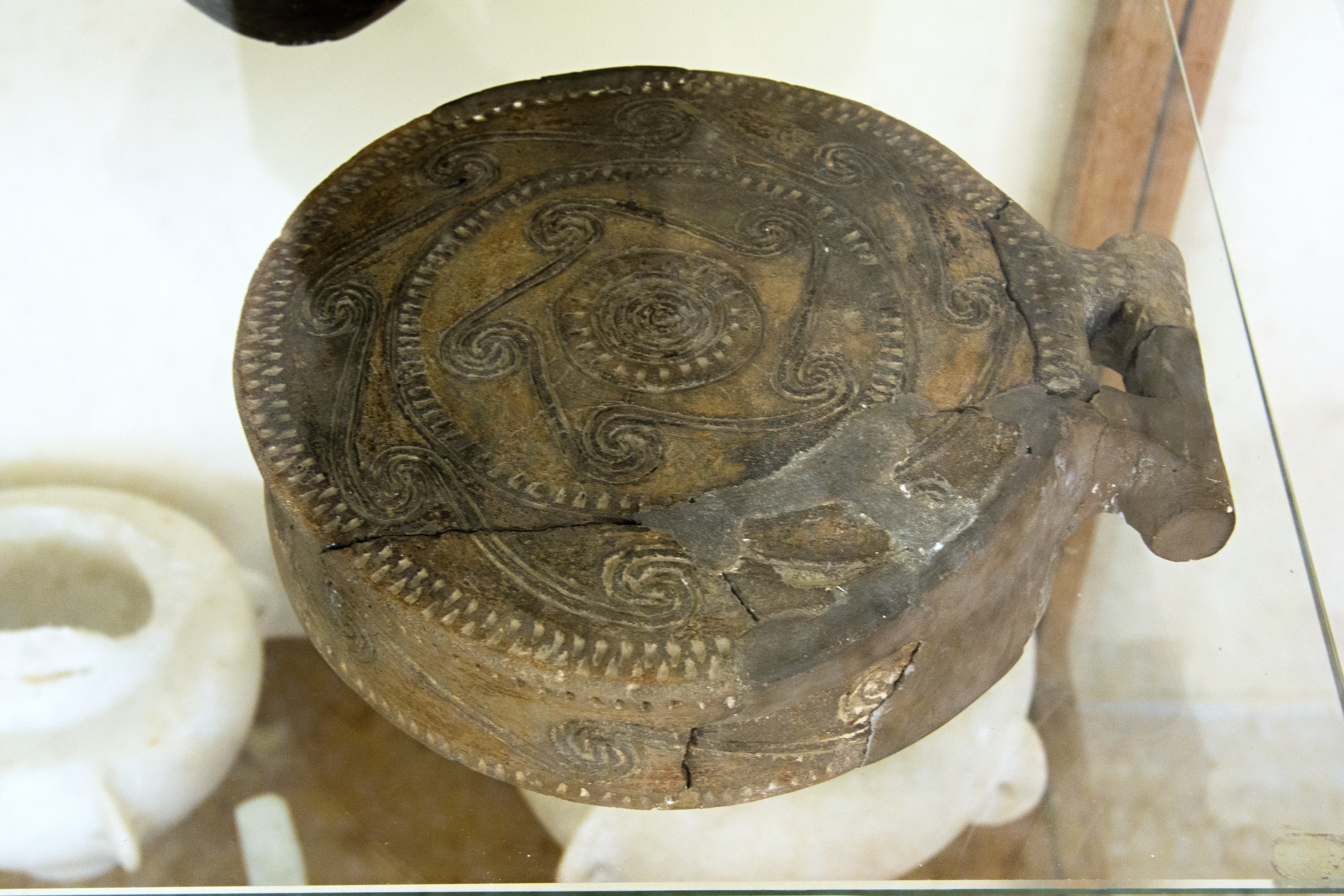
Paros 2136

The Cycladic Frying pan (Archaeological Museum of Paros, Inventory number 2136; National Archaeological Museum of Athens number 6291) is a ceramic object from the Bronze Age Cycladic culture of the Kampos type. The frying pan of the Early Cycladic period derives from grave 3 of the small cemetery of Kampos on the Cycladic island of Paros. It was discovered alone in autumn 1924 in the excavations led by Eirene Varoucha-Christodoulopoulou and was first published in 1926. It is displayed in the Archaeological Museum of Paros with the inventory number 2136. The purpose of Cycladic frying pans is not known.

== Description ==
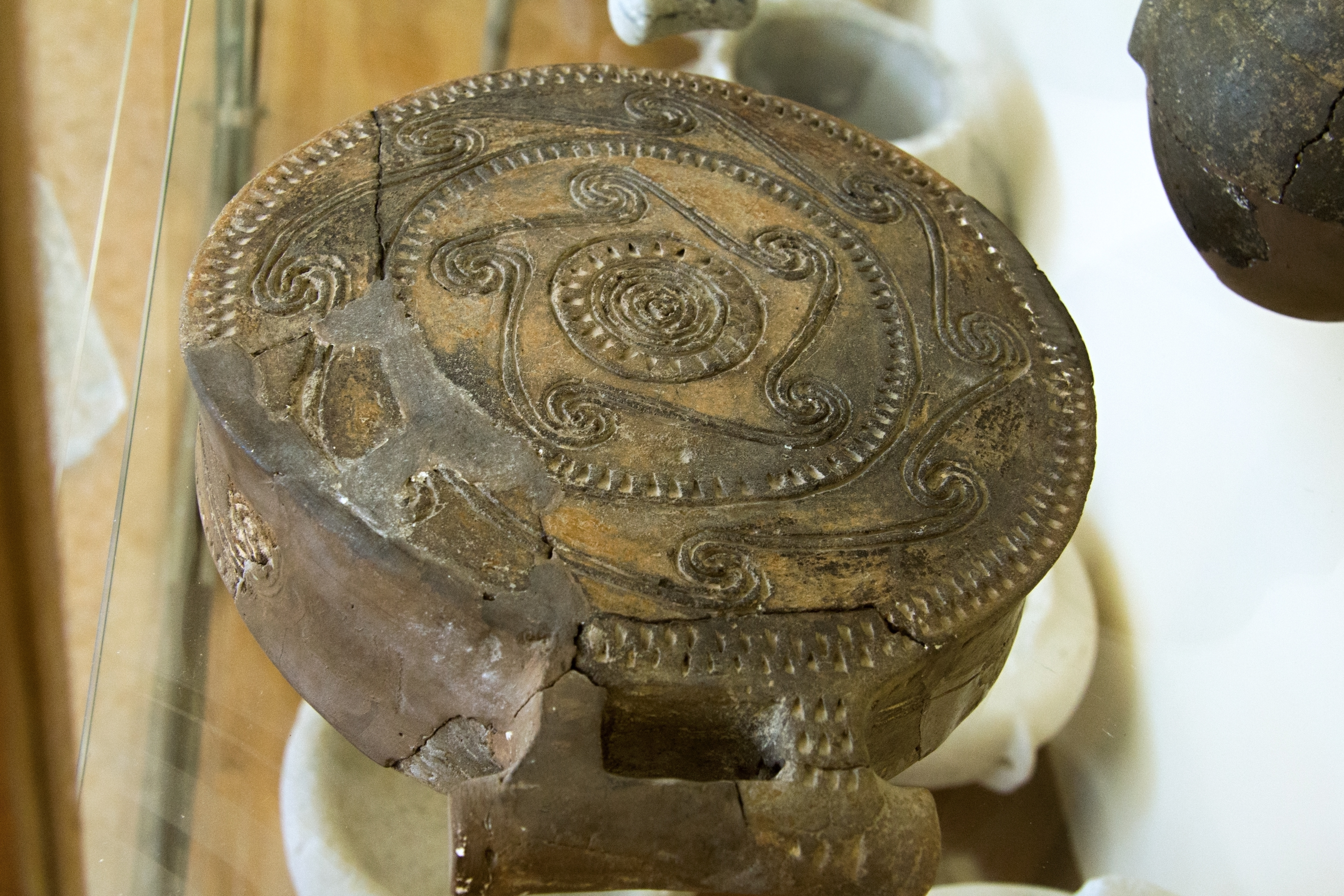
Another view

The frying pan is composed of several sherds; gaps in the handle, side and back have been filled in with plaster. The dark grey-brown / red-brown clay frying pan is 6.15 cm high and 23.8 cm long. At 20.45 cm, the diameter of the rim is slightly smaller than the diameter of the base (21.2 cm). The outer surface and the inner wall of the basin are coated in a dark grey-brown to olive-brown overcoat. The surface of the basin is unevenly smoothed, with low traces of sinter. The surface plate is decorated with several irregular circles, stamped triangle borders and two elongated spiral bands. The edge is looped by a double line, elongated spiral band with a row of triangles above and below. Traces of white paint remain in the indentations.

== Significance ==
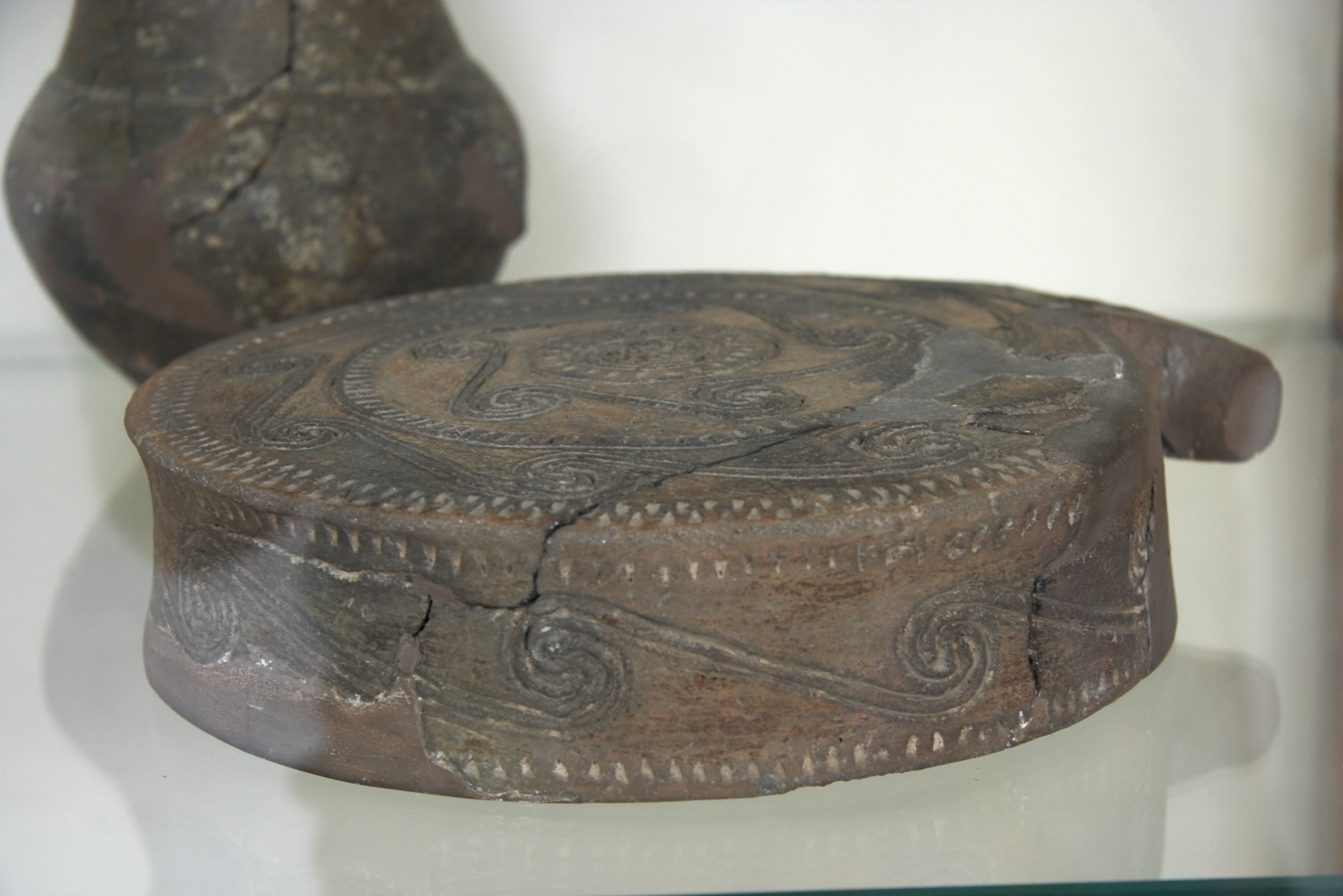
Paros 2136

Frying pans first appear in the early Cycladic Kampos group. They already include various characteristics. As a rule, there is a central motif surrounded by a group of incised concentric circles, bands of stamped triangles, and spirals linked with double lines. Star patterns are also common. The decoration does not take up the whole surface. Often the decorative elements of the back surface are repeated on the sides. The Π-shaped stirrup handle is set into the wall of the pan with thick arms.

There are two frying pans very similar to the example from Paros in form and decorations; one of unknown provenance in the Benaki Museum, Athens and a fragmentary example in the National Archaeological Museum of Athens, excavated by Christos Tsountas at Kato Akrotiri on Amorgos in 1898.

== See also ==
- Frying pan (NAMA 4974)
- Frying pan (Karlsruhe 75/11)

== Bibliography ==
- Irini Varoucha. "Kykladikoi taphoi tēs Parou (Κυκλαδικοί τάφοι της Πάρου)" Ephēmeris archaiologikē 1925–1926, pp. 98–114 (Digitised: p. 99, 107 Ill. 9).
- John E. Coleman. "“Frying Pans” of the Early Bronze Age Aegean." American Journal of Archaeology 89, 1985, pp. 191–219.
- Jörg Rambach. Kykladen I. Die frühe Bronzezeit – Grab- und Siedlungsbefunde. Habelt, Bonn 2000, ISBN 3-7749-2831-2, p. 144 Tbl. 80.
