= Spool-shaped pyxis (NAMA 5225) =

Ancient Cycladic ceramic

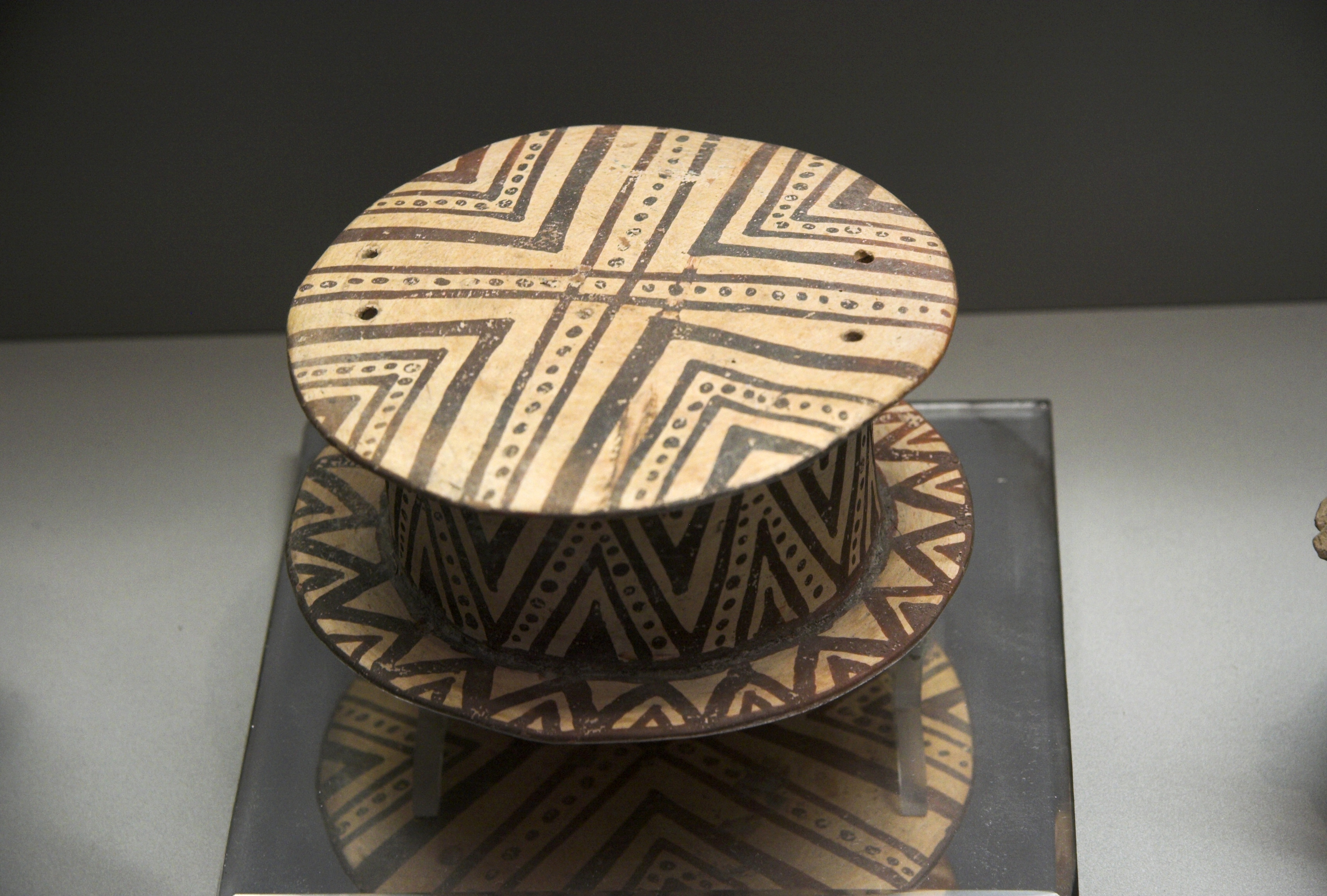
Spool-shaped pyxis (NAMA 5225)

The Spool-shaped pyxis (NAMA 5225) is a ceramic vessel from the Bronze Age Cycladic civilisation. The "dark on light" painted pyxis was found in grave 271 of the necropolis at Chalandriani on the Cycladic island of Syros and dates to the early Cycladic period (EC II, Keros-Syros culture). It was discovered in 1889/90 during excavations led by Christos Tsountas and as first published by Tsountas in 1899. It is displayed in the National Archaeological Museum, Athens with the inventory number 5225.

== Description ==
The pyxis is a unique ceramic object with an unusual shape. It consists of two nearly identical parts which sit one inside the other. The red-brown clay is very fine with no coarse grains. On the upper side is a pattern in red and brown paint. Similar patterns are found at Chalandriani on contemporary pyxides, which are rounder and have double eyelet handles.

On the upperside of the pyxis is a geometrical pattern in "dark on light" paint. Both parts consist of a flat, circular sheet with an open cylinder rising from it. The upper part has a larger diameter which allows it to be placed over the lower part. The overlapping area of the upper and lower parts is perforated with a pair of holes.

The upper part has a height of 4.95 cm and a diameter of 12.6 cm. The sides and underside of the flat part are painted with a similar pattern to the top surface. The lower part has a height of 4.8 cm and a diameter which varies between 12. and 12.1 cm. The exterior surface of the lower part has a pattern similar to the upper part; inside there are three parallel curves, one inside the other.

== Bibliography ==
- Tsountas, Christos (1899). "Kykladika II." Ephēmeris archaiologikē, pp. 110–111 (Digitised); Table 8, 11, 11a (Digitised).
- Rambach, Jörg (2000). Kykladen I. Die frühe Bronzezeit – Grab- und Siedlungsbefunde. Bonn: Habelt. p. 96. ISBN 3-7749-2831-2. Table 38.
