= Skillet (disambiguation) =

A skillet is a frying pan, generally large and heavy.

Skillet may also refer to:

- Skillet (band), an American Christian rock band
  - Skillet (album), the band's 1996 debut studio album
- Skillet (restaurant), a Seattle gourmet burger van
- Skillet skate, a deepwater fish

== See also ==
- Frying pan (disambiguation)
