= Chalandriani =

Bronze Age cemetery on Syros, Greece

- Χαλανδριανή (Greek)
- Location within Greece
- 37.4830°N 24.9342°E
- Type: Cemetery
- Periods: Early Cycladic II (c. 2700 – c. 2200 BCE)
- Location: Syros, Greece

Site notes
- Excavation dates: 1861; 1872–1873; 1898–1899; 1961–1962
- Archaeologists: Robert Carr Bosanquet; Christos G. Doumas; Christos Tsountas

Chalandriani (Greek: Χαλανδριανή) is a major Early Bronze Age cemetery on the Cycladic island of Syros in Greece, a little way to the south of the fortified prehistoric settlement of Kastri. Its tombs date mostly to the Early Cycladic II period (c. 2700 – c. 2200 BCE): more than 600 are known, making it the largest Early Cycladic cemetery yet discovered.

Most of the tombs at Chalandriani were constructed before the settlement of Kastri was first inhabited. The cemetery may have been used by the inhabitants of a second settlement, as yet unexcavated, in the area of the modern village of Chalandriani. At its peak, the community using the cemetery may have numbered between 75 and 150 people. The tombs in the cemetery are differentiated into groups spatially and by grave goods, suggesting a degree of social stratification between the burials. The tombs are of relatively small size, approximately 1.5 metres (4.9 ft) in diameter, and almost all contained a single burial. Among the grave goods discovered at Chalandriani are "frying pans", several of which are decorated with longboat motifs almost unknown from other sites.

The site was known by 1842, when a local historian made informal excavations of the tombs; it was further excavated by Grigorios Papadopoulos in 1861, who erroneously dated the cemetery to the Roman period. Further small-scale investigations over the succeeding decades, including those of Ludwig Pollak and Robert Carr Bosanquet, established it as belonging to Early Cycladic II, and Christos Tsountas made an extensive excavation of the site in 1898–1899. Tsountas's investigations formed part of his identification of what became known as Cycladic culture. Further archaeological work took place in the 1960s and 1980s, and the site was declared part of a protected archaeological zone in 1992.

== Cemetery ==
The site of Chalandriani is located on the northeastern coast of northern Syros, one of the Cycladic islands in the Aegean Sea. In the Early Cycladic II period (c. 2700 – c. 2200 BCE), it was a large cemetery, suggesting that Syros did not follow the pattern of some contemporary Cycladic islands (like Melos) in using many small funerary sites, but rather shared a tendency with Keos to prefer fewer, more nucleated burial areas. It has the largest number of Early Cycladic tombs of any single site yet discovered. In total, more than 600 graves have been discovered at the site.

The cemetery is distributed extensively along the Chalandra plateau, and is situated near the fortified prehistoric settlement of Kastri. Most of the tombs at Chalandriani, however, predate the occupation of the settlement, which was inhabited in the "Kastri Phrase" immediately following EC II. Another prehistoric settlement, probably over 1 hectare (10,000 m^{2}) in area, existed at the nearby modern village of Chalandriani, but has yet to be thoroughly archaeologically investigated; this settlement may have been home to the people buried at Chalandriani during the EC II phase. Cyprian Broodbank suggests that Chalandriani grew over time from a relatively small group of people using it, rather than being the result of several existing sites amalgamating together; he further estimates that the population using it may have numbered between 75 and 100 at its peak. Taking into account this relatively small population, he concludes that their social organisation was likely fairly simple, though it probably included individuals or families of differential social status.

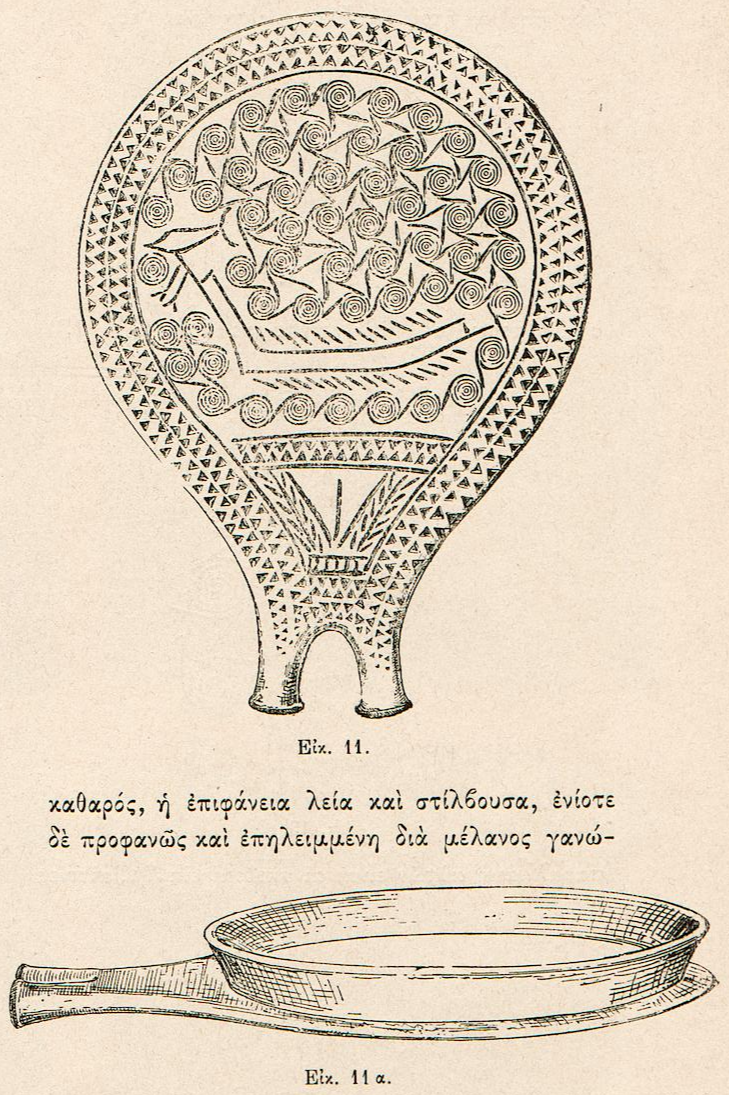
A so-called frying pan, whose original function is unknown, dating to the Early Bronze Age and found by Tsountas in a tomb at Chalandriani in 1889–1890.

The cemetery is divided into two parts, one to the west and the second to the east. Each part is composed of clusters of graves, which may have reflected different social ties between the burying groups. The graves themselves are built up from polygonal, oblong or circular pits, approximately 1.5 metres (4.9 ft) in diameter and slightly shorter in depth, and walled with overlapping courses (without mortar) of flat stones, forming a corbelled dome with an opening at the centre, which is filled with a capstone. The entrance to the tomb is often marked by upright slabs forming a doorway, around 0.6 to 0.8 metres (2.0 to 2.6 ft) high, and blocked by a slab or a dry-stone wall. The lintel of this doorway was usually made of green schist, while the grey limestone was the more common material used in the tomb. Sometimes, a short passageway led towards the threshold. Tombs of this kind are found only on Syros, though antecedents can be traced at the Final Neolithic cemetery at Kephala on Keos, and built tombs are found at other sites in the Cyclades and in Attica. Unlike most Early Cycladic tombs, which are not generally oriented to the compass in a consistent manner, the tombs at Chalandriani all faced between northwest and northeast.

Almost all of the tombs contained a single burial, while nine had two or three. Secondary burial does not appear to have been widely practised. Burials were placed in a crouched position, not covered with earth, and often had their heads placed on a pillow-like slab of stone. Most of the tombs contained grave goods, sometimes placed in a niche on the wall, or else on the floor of the tomb, usually in front of the body's face. The grave goods found in the tombs are diverse and suggest a level of differentiation according to social status. They include both undecorated and painted pottery vessels, as well as ceramic "frying pans" of unclear function, marble vases, metal tools and pins, and obsidian blades, though few of the marble figurines more common at other contemporary sites. The "frying pans" from Chalandriani show longboat motifs in their decoration far more often than those from other sites, where such images are rare. Broodbank argues that this may indicate that longboats were particularly important to the community using the settlement, and perhaps that "the community maintained its preferential position and differentiated status in part by the coercive use of longboats against smaller communities that were kept too short on manpower to retaliate in kind".

== Excavations ==
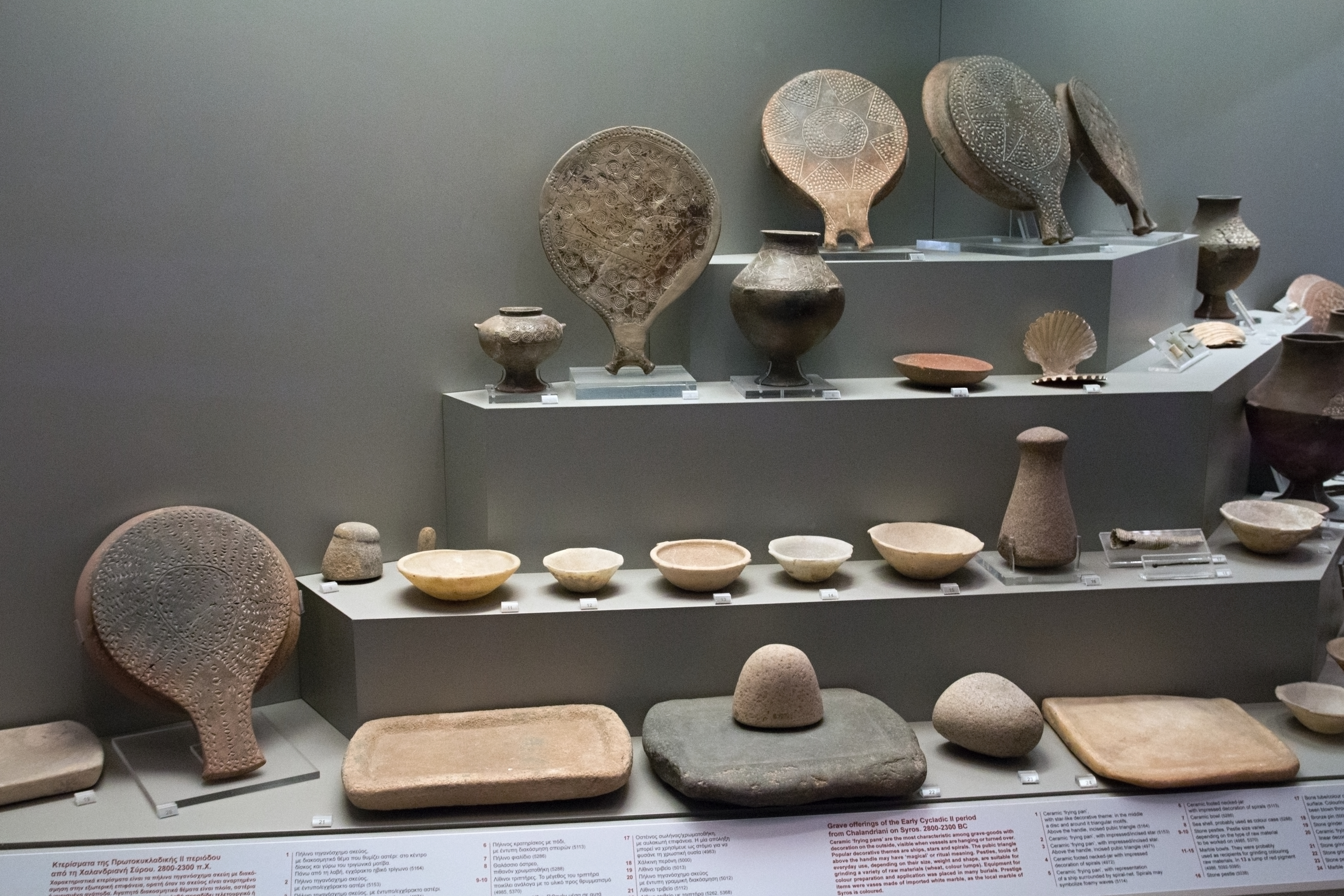
Grave goods from Chalandriani in the National Archaeological Museum, Athens

A booklet written in 1842 by P. Zolontas, a historian native to Syros, mentions the discovery of ancient tombs in the area of the Chalandriani cemetery: this is the first known reference to ancient remains at the site. Zolontas excavated some of these tombs, probably removing some of the objects from them. The first formal excavations took place under Grigorios Papadopoulos in 1861, who excavated around 100 tombs and removed around 30 vessels, but found no skeletal remains. Papadopoulos incorrectly dated the tombs to the Roman period, believing them to be the graves of exiles sent to the nearby island of Gyaros. In 1872–1873, the doctor and anthropologist Klon Stephanos, from Ermoupoli on Syros, excavated there, and correctly identified the cemetery as older than the Mycenaean civilisation recently discovered on the Greek mainland.

In the summer of 1894, the Austro-Czech archaeologist Ludwig Pollak visited Chalandriani and studied tombs and objects from the cemeteries, including a "frying pan" held in a private collection in Ermoupoli. In May of the same year, the British archaeologist Robert Carr Bosanquet excavated a single grave while travelling via the island in May 1894 and noticed that several graves had been looted by local people. Between 1898 and 1899, Christos Tsountas excavated the cemetery of Chalandriani and the settlement of Kastri on behalf of the Archaeological Society of Athens. This was the first large-scale excavation of an Early Cycladic II site, where Tsountas unearthed 540 graves within a year. Tsountas published his findings in the Archaeological Journal, a scholarly publication of the Archaeological Society: his 1898 article may have been the first systematic study of the economic life of an archaeological site. (Note: Mylona 2003, p. 193. The article is Tsountas 1898.) As part of this work, Tsountas coined the term Cycladic culture for the material culture found at Chalandriani and related sites.

The American archaeologist John Caskey visited Chalandriani in the early 1960s, correctly dating the cemetery to the Early Cycladic II period. Excavations resumed in 1961–1962 under Christos G. Doumas, an epimelitis (junior official) of the Greek Archaeological Service in the Cyclades, who excavated eight graves in the western part of the cemetery. (Note: Marthari 1998, p. 18. For Doumas's dates, see Coleman 1979, p. 108) Around the same time, Nikolaos Zafeiropoulos, the ephor (supervising archaeological official) of the Cyclades, excavated two more graves, assisted by Evangelos Kakovoyannis. Further research was conducted in 1989 by Jan Jakob Hekman, who made a surface survey of the cemetery. In 1992, the area of Chalandriani–Kastri was designated a protected archaeological zone by the Greek government.

== Selected finds ==
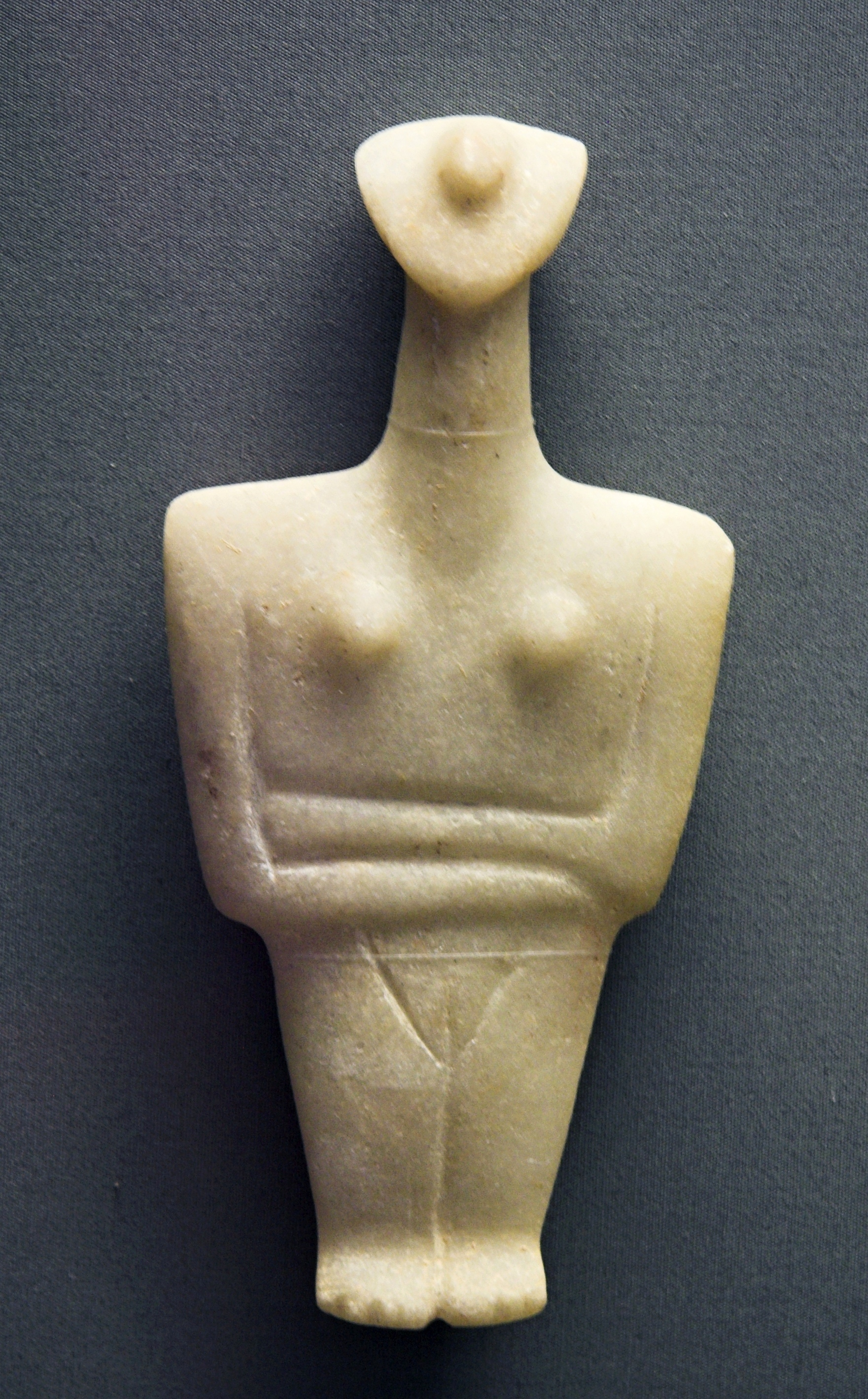
Cycladic figurine, Early Cycladic II (2800–2300 BCE)

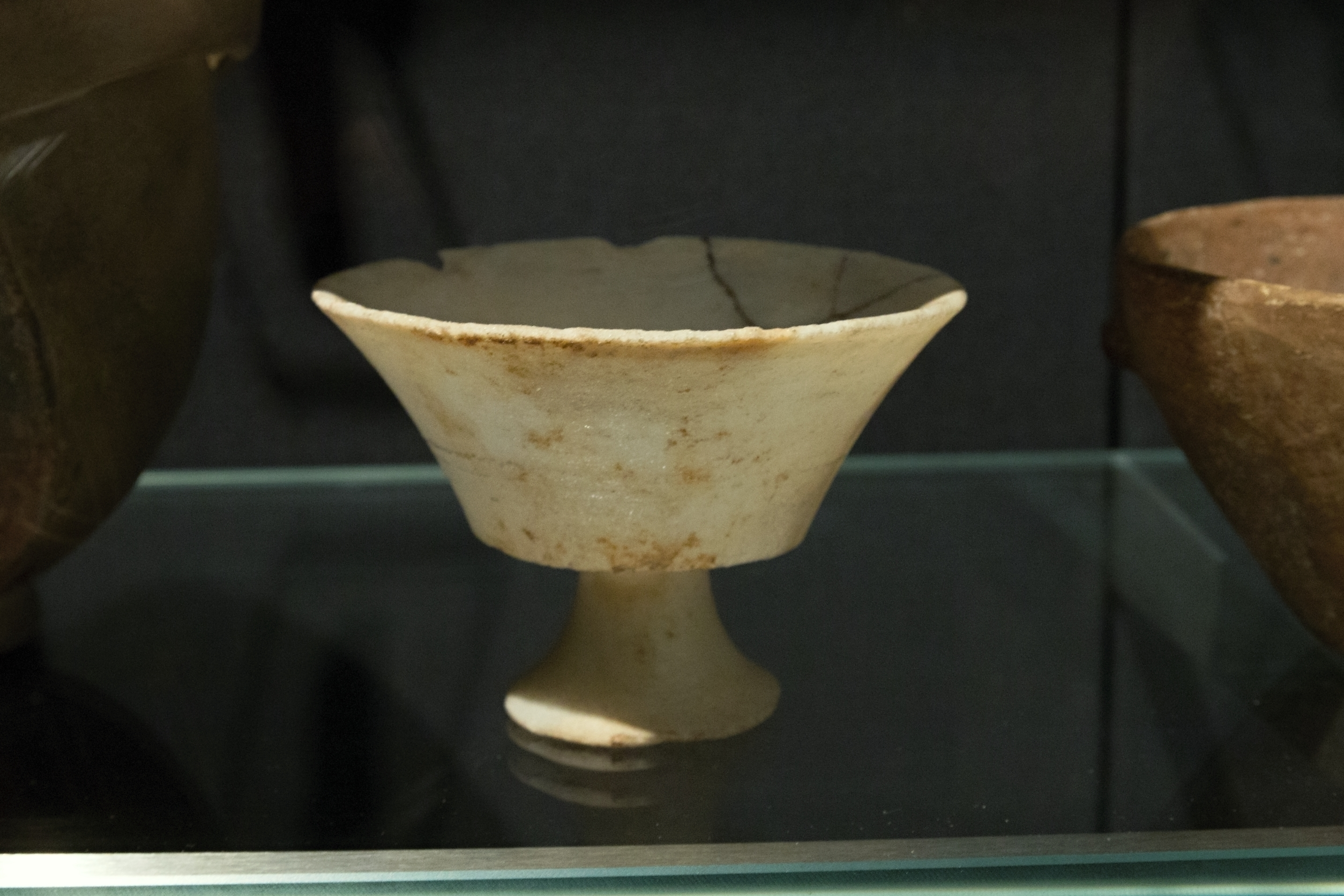
Marble cup, now in the British Museum, Early Cycladic II (2800–2300 BCE)

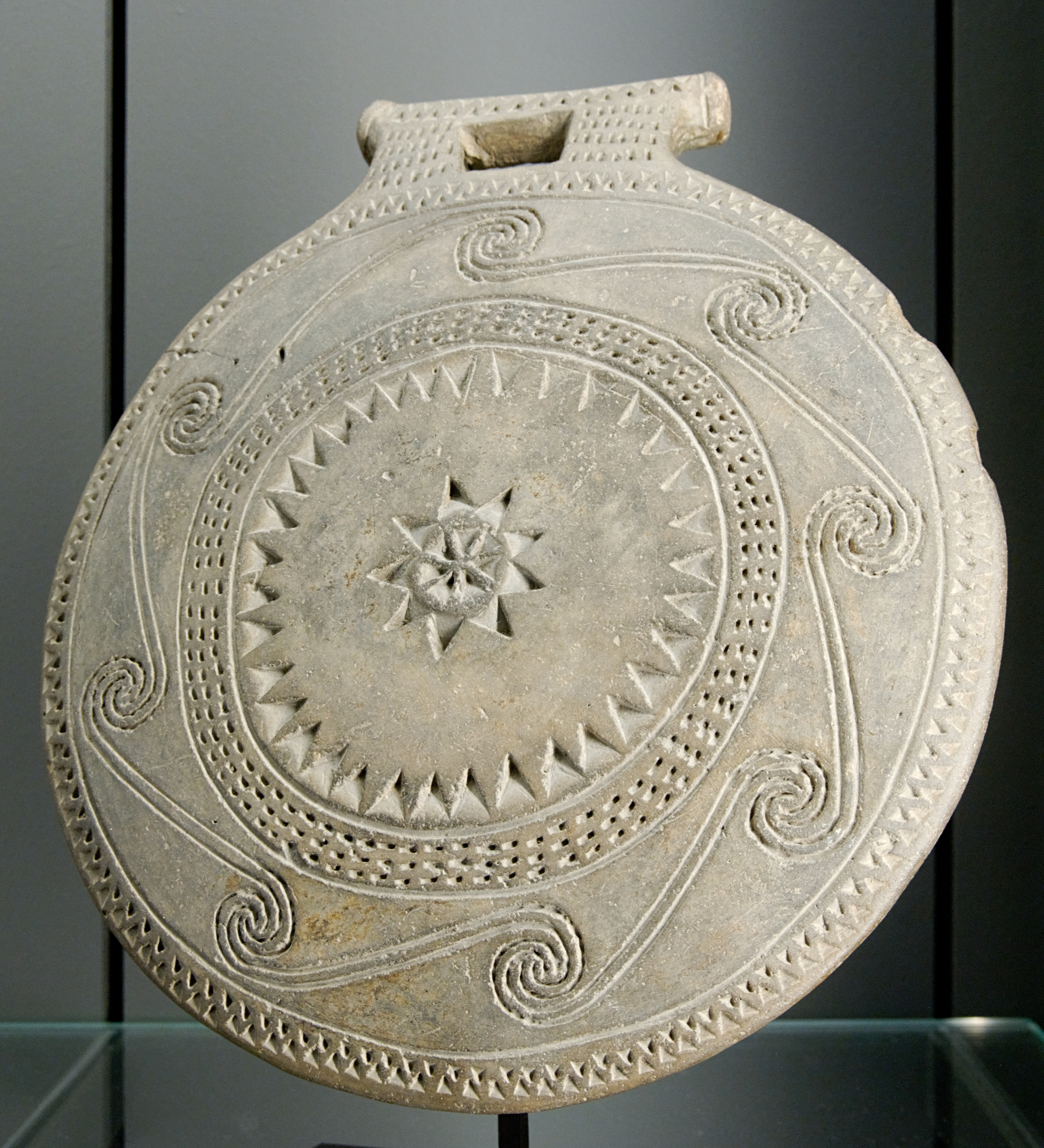
A "frying pan" with inscribed spiral decoration, now in the Louvre

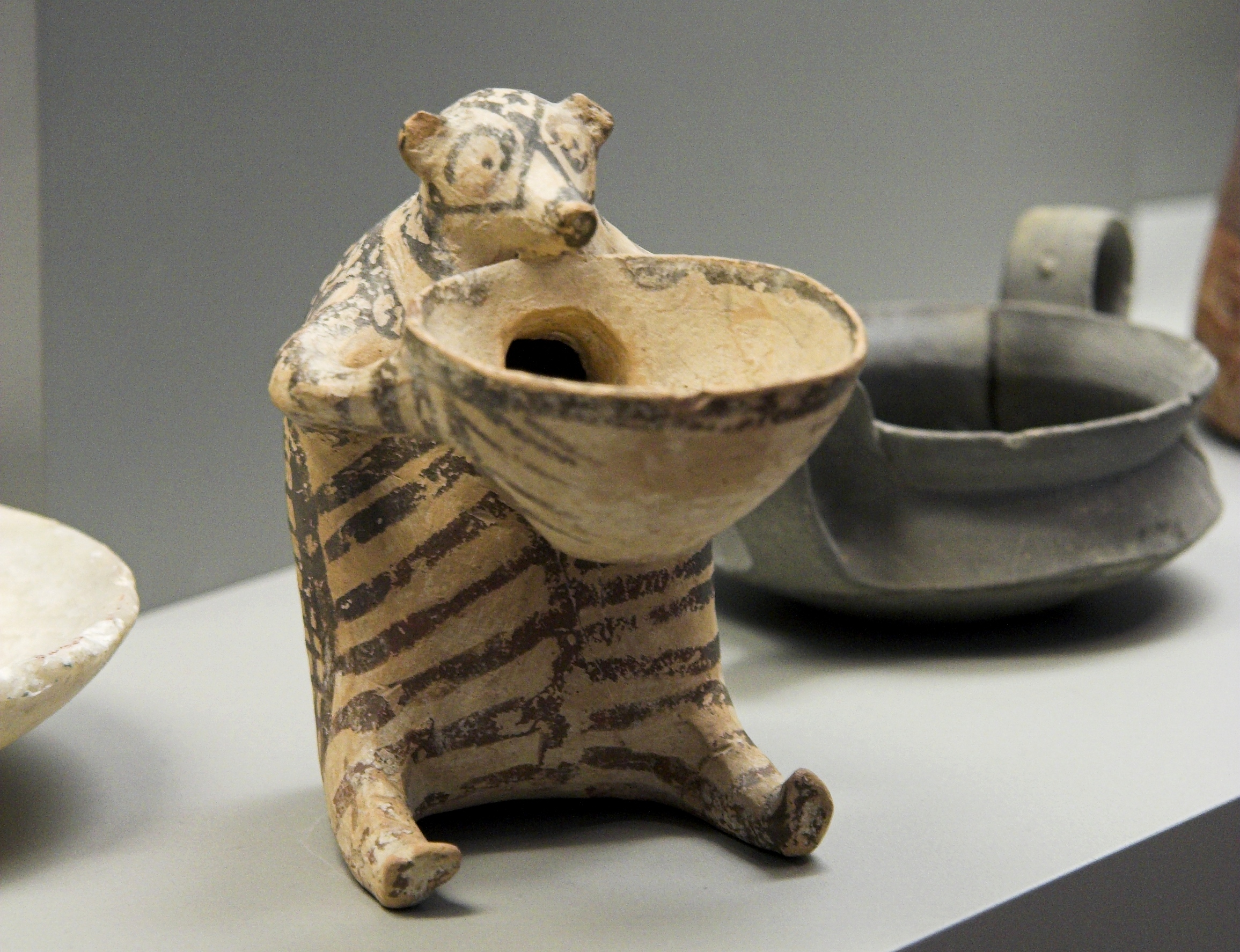
A rhyton (vessel for pouring libations) in the form of a bear or pig, Early Cycladic II (2800–2300 BCE), now in the National Archaeological Museum, Athens

== See also ==
- History of the Cyclades
- Cycladic art

== Bibliography ==
- Broodbank, Cyprian (1989). "The Longboat and Society in the Cyclades in the Keros–Syros Culture". American Journal of Archaeology. 93 (3): 319–337. doi:10.2307/505584. JSTOR 505584.
- Broodbank, Cyprian (2008). "The Early Bronze Age in the Cyclades". In Shelmerdine, Cynthia (ed.). The Cambridge Companion to the Aegean Bronze Age. Cambridge: Cambridge University Press. pp. 44–76.
- Coleman, John E. (1979). "Review: Early Bronze Age Burial Habits in the Cyclades, by Christos Doumas". American Journal of Archaeology. 83 (1): 108. doi:10.2307/504243. JSTOR 504243.
- Fitton, J. Lesley (1999). Cycladic Art. London: British Museum Press. ISBN 978-0-7141-2160-4.
- Georgiadis, Mercourios (2012). Kos in the Neolithic and Early Bronze Age: The Halasarna Finds and the Aegean Settlement Pattern. Philadelphia: INSTAP Academic Press. ISBN 978-1-62303-114-5.
- Hekman, Jan Jakob (2003). The Early Bronze Age Cemetery at Chalandriani on Syros (Cyclades, Greece) (PhD thesis). University of Groningen.
- Marthari, Marisa (1998). Syros, Chalandriani, Kastri: From the Investigation and Protection to the Presentation of an Archaeological Site. Athens: Ministry of the Aegean, 21st Ephorate of Antiquities, Ministry of Culture.
- Muskett, Georgina (2014). "The Aegean World". In Bahn, Paul (ed.). The History of Archaeology: An Introduction. Abingdon: Routledge. pp. 39–56. ISBN 978-1-317-99942-3.
- Mylona, Dimitra (2003). "Archaeological Fish Remains in Greece: General Trends of the Research and a Gazetteer of Sites". British School at Athens Studies. 9: 193–200. JSTOR 40960346.
- Shelmerdine, Cynthia (2008). "Introduction: Background, Methods and Sources". In Shelmerdine, Cynthia (ed.). The Cambridge Companion to the Aegean Bronze Age. Cambridge: Cambridge University Press. pp. 1–18.
- Thimme, Jürgen (1977). Art and Culture of the Cyclades: Handbook of an Ancient Civilisation. Karlsruhe: C. F. Müller. ISBN 978-3-7880-9573-4.
- Tsountas, Christos (1898). Κυκλαδικά [Cycladic Matters]. Ἀρχαιολογικὴ Ἐφημερίς (in Greek): 137–212.
