= Luo Linquan =

Chinese diplomat (born 1956)

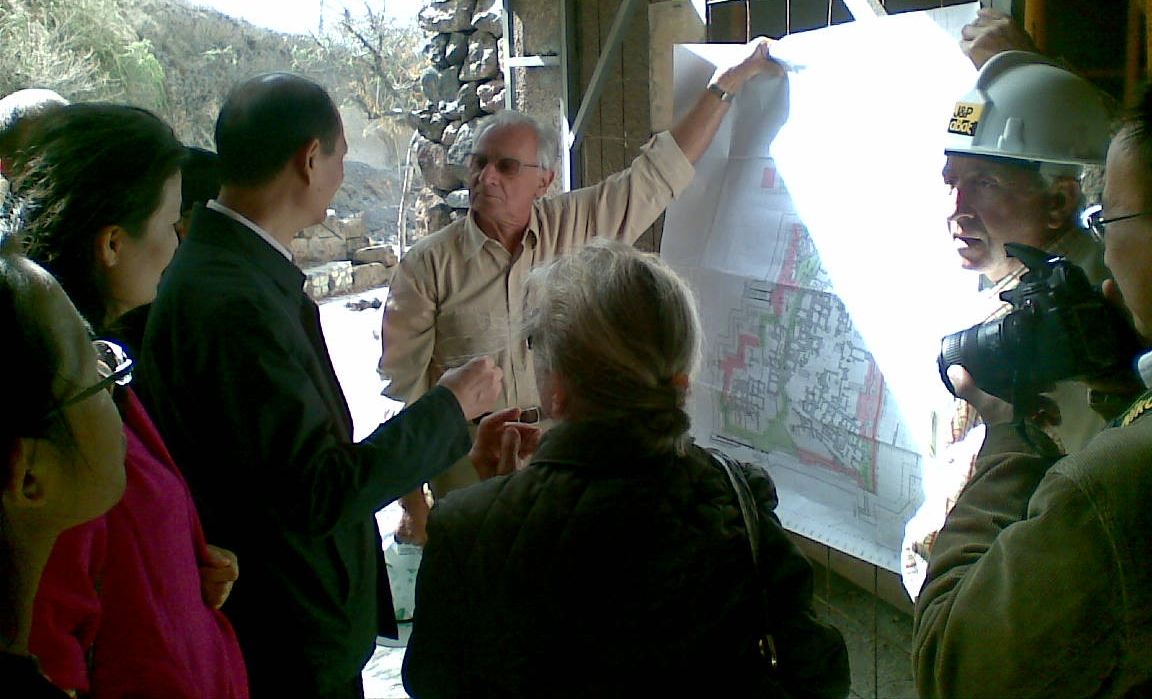
Luo Linquan talking with the archaeologist Christos G. Doumas in Santorini

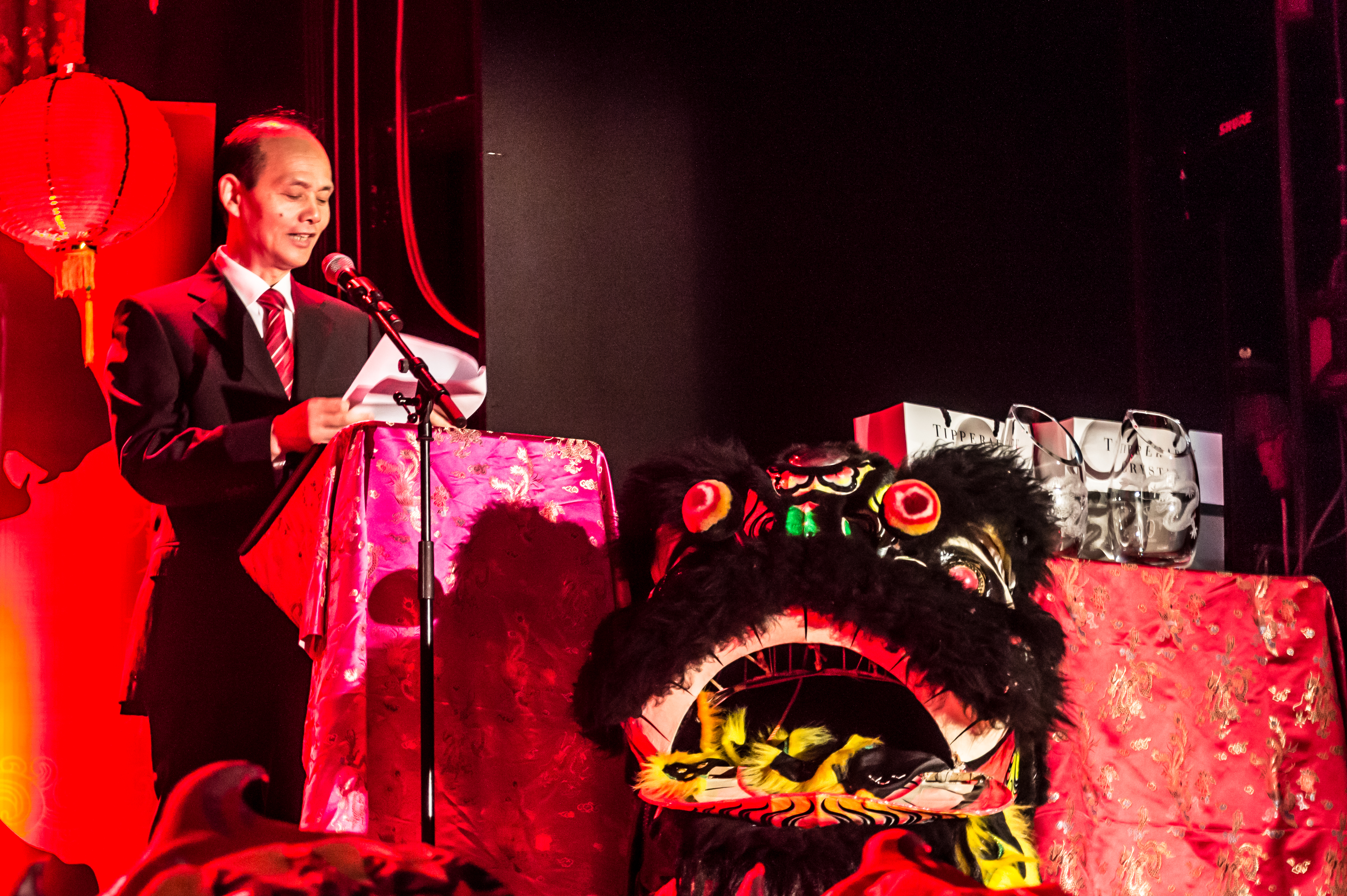
Luo Linquan launches the 2012 Chinese New Year Festival in Dublin, Ireland

Luo Linquan (Chinese: 罗林泉; pinyin: Luò Línquán) (born April 1956) is the current Consul General of the People's Republic of China in San Francisco USA. He entered this position in December 2014. Previously, Luo served as the People's Republic of China Ambassador to Ireland from 2011 to 2013 and People's Republic of China Ambassador to Greece from 2007 to 2011. Prior to his two ambassadorships, he worked in the Protocol Department of the Ministry of Foreign Affairs of the People's Republic of China, at the Ministry's Hong Kong office, and in China's Consulate-General in New York City. Luo is married with one son.
