= Frying pan (Karlsruhe 75/11) =

Bronze Age Cycladic artifact

Cycladian frying pan
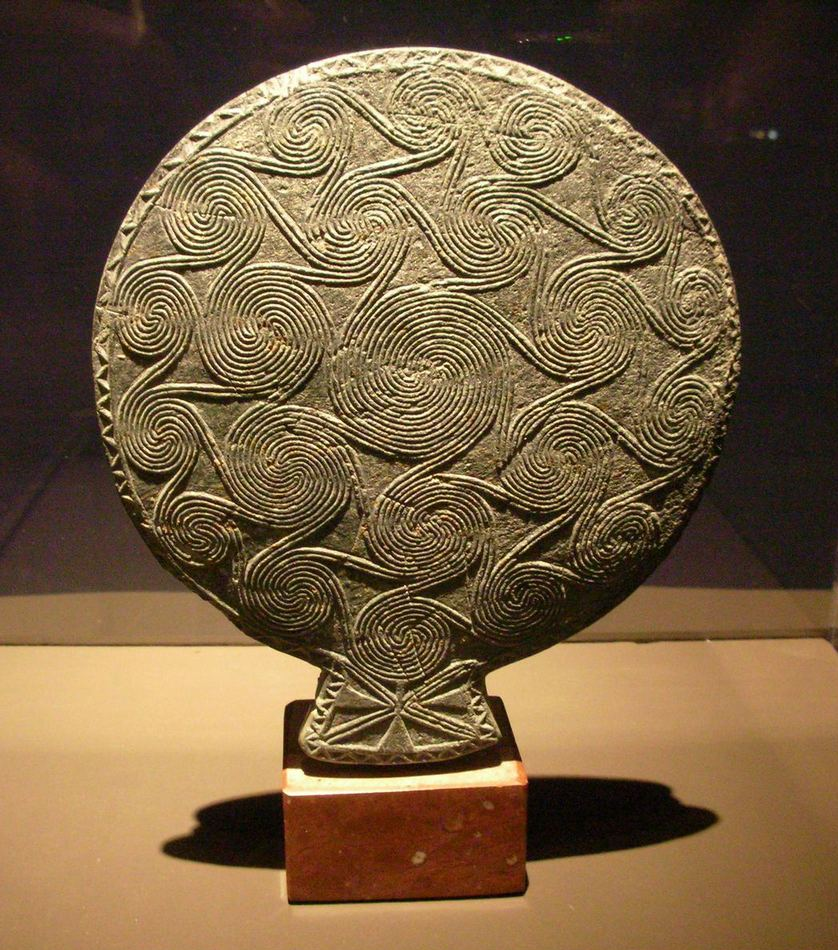
- Underside of the Cycladian frying pan 75/11
- Material: Greenschist
- Width: 17.5 cm
- Created: c. 2500 BC
- Discovered: 1975
- Discovered by: Jurgen Thimme
- Present location: Athens, Attica, Greece

The Cycladian "frying pan" known as "Karlsruhe 75/11"—from its former location and inventory number in the Baden State Museum in Karlsruhe, Germany—is an ornately carved stone object from the Bronze Age Cycladic civilization of the Aegean. It dates to the Early Cycladic period, between the 27th and 24th centuries BC (EC II). The find spot is unknown, except that it originated on the Cycladic island of Naxos. The item derived from an illegal excavation and was acquired in 1975 by the Baden State Museum in Karlsruhe. On 6 June 2014 it was repatriated to the National Archaeological Museum of Athens, Greece.

It is one of only a few Cycladic frying pans in stone; the great majority of the 200-odd known are pottery.

== Description ==
The frying pan is a round dish with a diameter of 17.5 cm and a depth of 2.8 cm. There is a 2.2 cm long handle in the shape of a pie slice. It is made from greenschist, which derives from the Cycladic island of Naxos.

The front side, with a flat bottom and narrow, recessed edge, is undecorated. It is the back side which makes the object stand out. This surface is surrounded by a chip patterned band, even on the handle. The area inside this band is filled with a pattern of interwoven spirals. A single large spiral in the centre is connected by double strands to seven medium-sized spirals surrounding it. These seven spirals are surrounded by an outer row of fourteen yet smaller spirals. Each of the seven medium spirals are connected to two of their neighbours and to three of the spirals in the outer row. The spirals on the outer edge are each connected to their two neighbours and are formed of three or four spirals, depending on whether they are linked to one or two of the medium-sized spirals. On the handle, double and triple strands form a crisscross pattern with triangles.

The outer surface of the bowl is a bit weathered, slightly knocked and has a few scratches on it. On the inside there are flecks of sinter; a thick layer of sinter was removed from the decorated back side in modern times, revealing the patterns now visible.

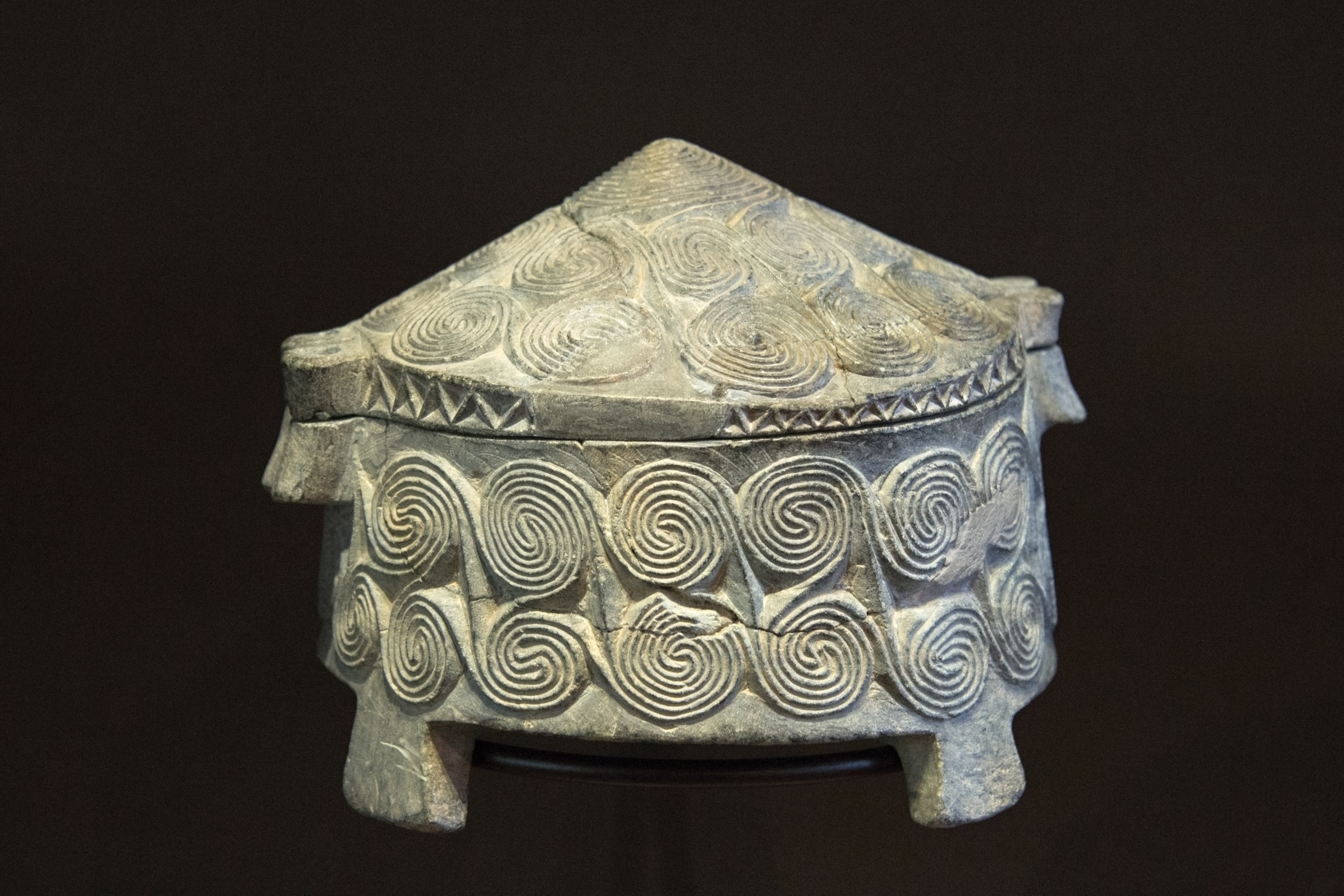
Lidded pyxis with similar spiral pattern, Antikensammlung Berlin

Patterns of interlocking spirals are often incised in Cycladic pottery, but in stone they are found on only a few items, particularly pyxides. An example was discovered in excavations on the island of Amorgos and acquired for the Antikensammlung Berlin by Georg Ferdinand Dümmler. The quality of the work and the very carefully executed pattern ought to be attributed to an experienced and especially talented artisan. The frying pan must have been a prominent prestige object for its owner.

In the Keros-Syros phase of the Cycladic civilization, to which this piece is attributed, ceramic frying pans are very common. In addition a very few are known which are made out of marble. But the only other example made out of stone is an undecorated example first published by Nikolaos M. Kontoleon in 1972. This frying pan is thus unique in material and execution and is therefore seen as a "masterpiece of Cycladic art."

== Purpose ==
The use and purpose of Cycladic frying pans is unclear. They are mostly known as grave goods in especially rich graves. Christos Tsountas originally suggested that they were mirrors. According to him, the flat bowl would have been filled with water and the user would have been able to see their reflection in them. A 2009 study concluded, via experimentation, that the frying pans work effectively as mirrors when filled water or olive oil, particularly if either liquid was darkened with pigments. While the study found olive oil to be particularly effective it is believed to have been too rare and expensive for this kind of use in the early Cycladic period, though recent discoveries on the island of Keros of a large pyramid, complex plumbing, and highly advanced metallurgy suggest that olive oil may have not been seen as rare. Any civilization that can move large blocks of stone from 10 kilometers away was surely capable of providing olive oil for any such purpose.

On account of several finds in the cemetery of Chalandriani on the island of Syros and small examples of clay and bone with paint residue, Nikolaos M. Kontoleon suggested that they could have been palettes for the creation of paints from crushed pigments.

The decoration of the frying pans recall water, almost without exception. Spirals, ships and stars are usual. The ceramic frying pans often have two handles, projecting from the body with a women's genitals incised in the triangular space between them. On account of this, it has been suggested that they received libations in some kind of fertility rite; sea, Sun and femininity may have been seen as symbols of the fertility of the body and the sea, which was essential for human life.

A further possibility was raised by Christos Doumas in 1993, who suggested that they were used to process sea salt. Doumas connected the issue of trade and exchange of goods before the invention of money with this, proposing that salt might have served as a valuable material, while leaving no archaeologically detectable traces.

== Provenance ==
In 1975, in the lead up to the 1976 exhibition "Kunst der Kykladen" (Art of the Cyclades), the then curator of the Badisches Landesmuseum, Jürgen Thimme, bought the frying pan from an art dealer for 35,000 marks along with a female Cycladic figurine (Karlsruhe 75/49) and other artefacts. The frying pan did not derive from a legal excavation, but the vendor guaranteed that the object had been acquired before 1970, although he offered no evidence and remained anonymous. In any case, an illegal excavation violated Greek law and the object could only have been removed from the country by smuggling. But since the original acquisition took place before 1970, the UNESCO Convention for the Banning and Prevention of Illegal Import, Export and Sale of Cultural Artefacts enacted in 1970 would not have been violated and the purchase would have been legal under international law. In addition, the German Republic only signed the convention in 2007.

The exhibition in the Karlsruhe Schloss in 1976 featured by far the widest collection of Cycladic objects displayed up till that time. In accord with the then prevailing view in Museum circles and with the support of the International Council of Museums loans from international museums and a number of private collections were displayed without scrutinising their provenance. The Greek antiquities department objected to this at the time of the exhibition first being publicised and therefore refused to make any pieces from their state collections available for the exhibition. However, the then leader of the antiquities department of the Cyclades, Christos Doumas wrote the chapter for the exhibition catalogue on the archaeological exploration of Cycladic culture and spoke in it about graverobbing.

After Germany acceded to the UNESCO convention in 2007, museums found themselves in a problematic situation - especially the Badische Landesmuseum. In their second great international exhibition in 2011, Kykladen - Lebenswelten einer frühgriechischen Kultur (Cyclades - Life-world of an Early Greek Culture), the Landesmuseum specifically identified the provenance of the exhibits and displayed only objects from national and international collection which disclosed the origin of the pieces. Objects from private collections were not displayed. But the Greek authorities were not satisfied with their handling of the issues and again refused to loan items.

Long negotiations followed and on 6 June 2014, the frying pan, along with figurine 75/49 were returned to the National Archaeological Museum of Athens by the State Secretary of the Baden-Württemberg Ministry of Scholarship, Research & Art, Harald Siebenmorgen, in the company of the Greek Minister of Culture Panagiotis Panagiotopoulos. The current value of the frying pan has been estimated to lie in the millions of Euros.

== Bibliography ==
- Jürgen Thimme, ed. (1976). Kunst und Kultur der Kykladeninseln im 3. Jahrtausend vor Christus. C. F. Müller, Karlsruhe. pp. 338, 517, No. 364. ISBN 3-7880-9568-7.
- John E. Coleman (1985). ""Frying Pans" of the Early Bronze Age Aegean". American Journal of Archaeology. 89 (2): 191–219. doi:10.2307/504325. JSTOR 504325.
