= Ludwig Pollak =

- Born: 14 September 1868; Prague, Austria-Hungary
- Died: c. 23 October 1943 (aged 75); Auschwitz concentration camp, General Government

Ludwig Pollak (14 September 1868 – c. 23 October 1943) was a Czech classical archaeologist, antiquities dealer and director of the Museo di Scultura Antica Giovanni Barracco. Pollak is best known for the 1905 discovery of the missing right arm of Laocoön from the statue of Laocoön and His Sons. Pollak died at the Auschwitz concentration camp.

== Biography ==
Pollak was born on 14 September 1868 in Prague. He is perhaps best known for discovering in 1905 the missing right arm of Laocoön in the famous ancient Roman sculpture Laocoön and His Sons. The rest of the statue had been discovered in 1506, with the arm as well as several other pieces, including the arms of the sons and parts of the snake, missing. The Renaissance sculptor Michelangelo had correctly suggested that the missing right arms were originally bent back over the shoulder; however, most others disagreed, opting for a reconstructed arm in an heroic extended fashion. This incorrectly reconstructed arm was added to the statue.

In 1905, Pollak discovered a fragment of a marble arm in a builder's yard in Rome, close to the findspot of the rest of the statue. Noting a stylistic similarity to the Laocoön group he presented it to the Vatican Museums: it remained in their storerooms for half a century. In 1957 (after Pollak's murder at Auschwitz) the museum decided that this arm—bent, as Michelangelo had suggested—had originally belonged to this Laocoön, and replaced it. According to Paolo Liverani: "Remarkably, despite the lack of a critical section, the join between the torso and the arm was guaranteed by a drill hole on one piece which aligned perfectly with a corresponding hole on the other".

Pollak died on c. 23 October 1943 in the Auschwitz concentration camp.

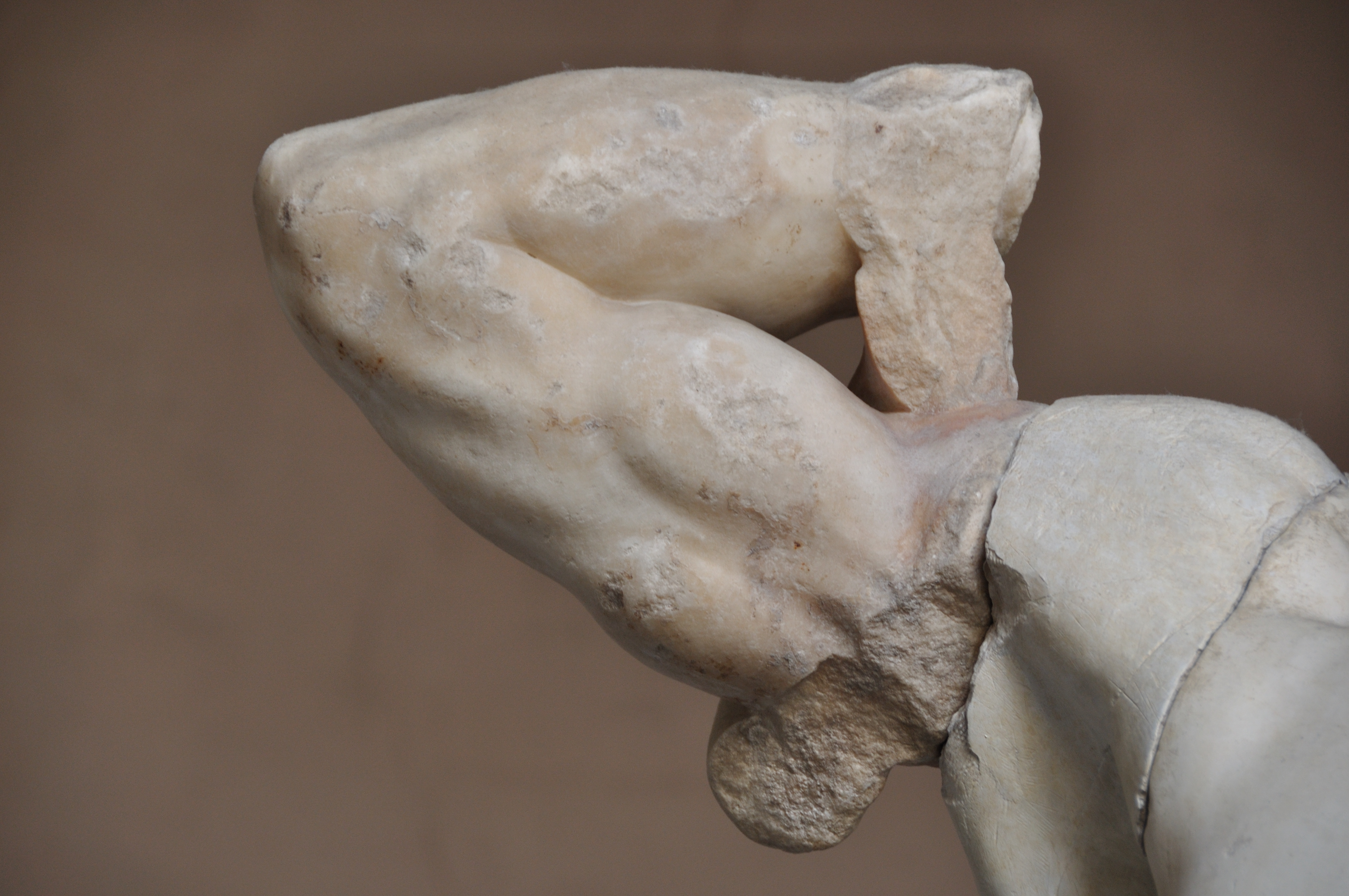
The original right arm of the Laocoön and His Sons, discovered in 1905 by Pollak

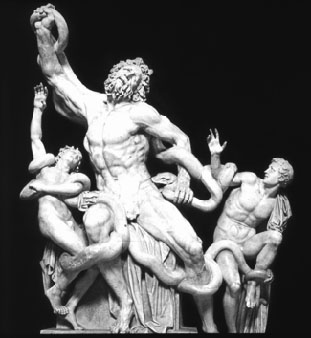
The statue as it appeared before 1957, with Laocoön's incorrectly reconstructed extended right arm

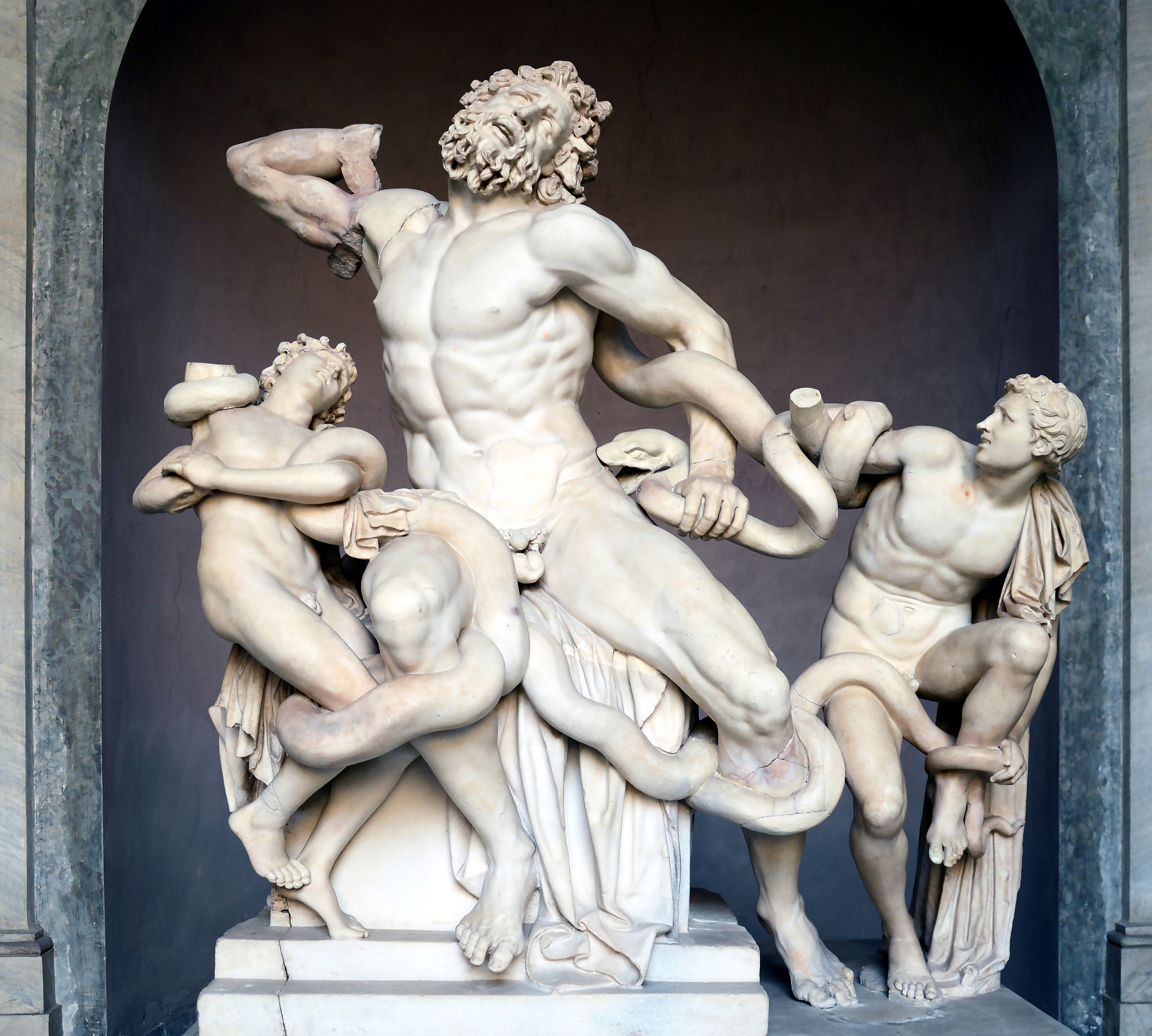
The statue after 1957

== Legacy ==
Ludwig Pollak's story forms the basis of the 2021 German novel, Pollaks Arm by Hans Von Trotha (English translation by Elizabeth Lauffer ISBN 978-1-954404-00-7). Pollak's genealogy (including his being a descendant of Rabbi Yehuda Löw (the "MAHARAL" of Prague) and family history forms the basis of a chapter of the non-fiction book The Wedding Photo (2018) by Dan A. Oren.
