= Frying pan (NAMA 4974) =

Ceramic item from the Bronze Age Cycladic civilization

Cycladic frying pan
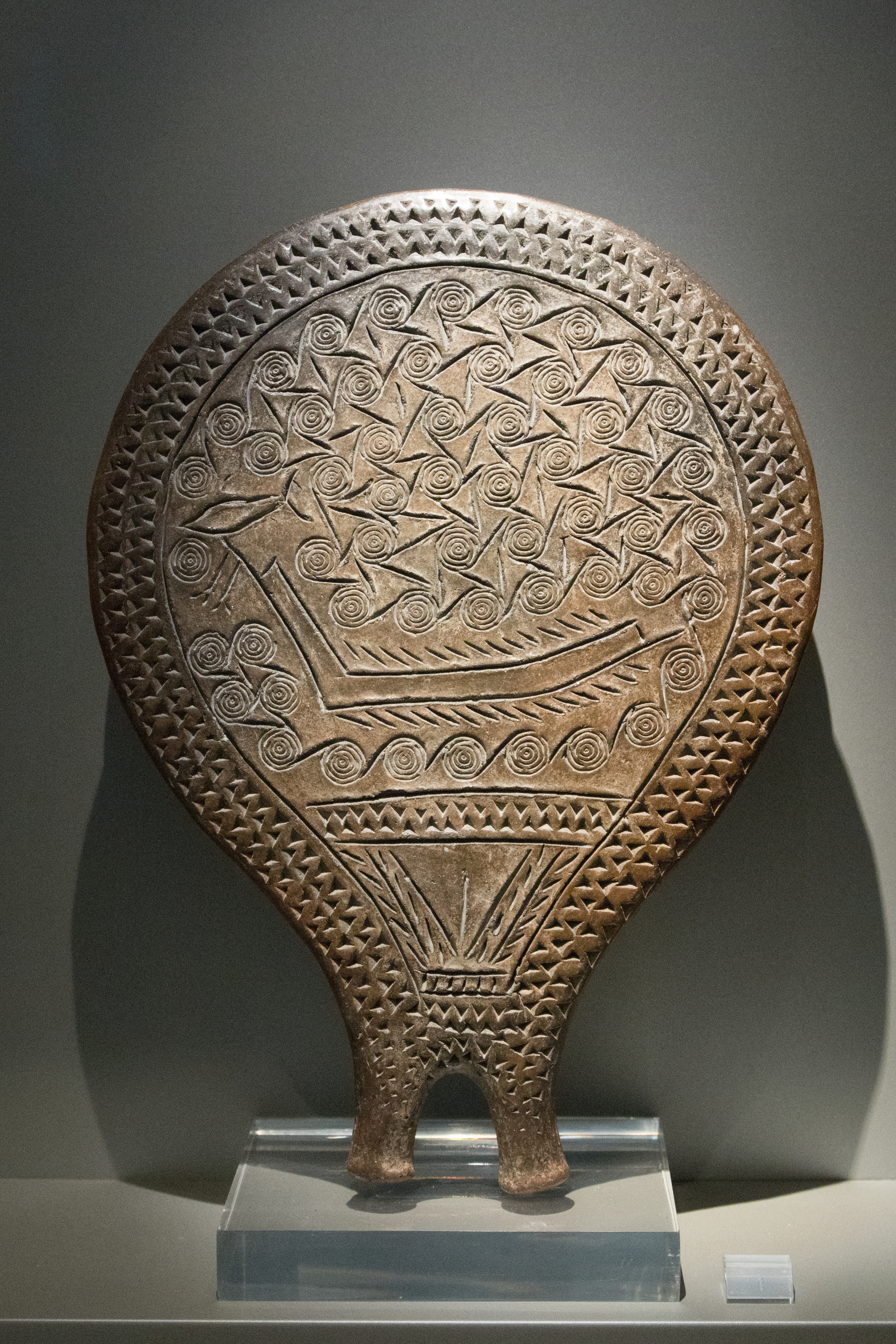
- Material: Clay
- Size: Length: 28.2 cm Width: 20.1 cm
- Created: c. 2500 BC
- Discovered: 1889 or 1890; Chalandriani, Syros, Greece
- Discovered by: Christos Tsountas
- Present location: National Archaeological Museum, Athens
- Identification: 4974

The Cycladic frying pan (NAMA 4974) is a ceramic item from the Bronze Age Cycladic civilization. It dates to the early Cycladic period, between the 28th and 23 centuries BC (EC II). The frying pan derives from grave 74 of Chalandriani cemetery on the Cycladian island of Syros. It was discovered in 1889/1890 during excavations led by Christos Tsountas, along with other pottery and was first published by Tsountas in 1899. With the inventory number 4974, the frying pan is now kept in the National Archaeological Museum of Athens. The purpose of the frying pan is unknown.

== Description ==
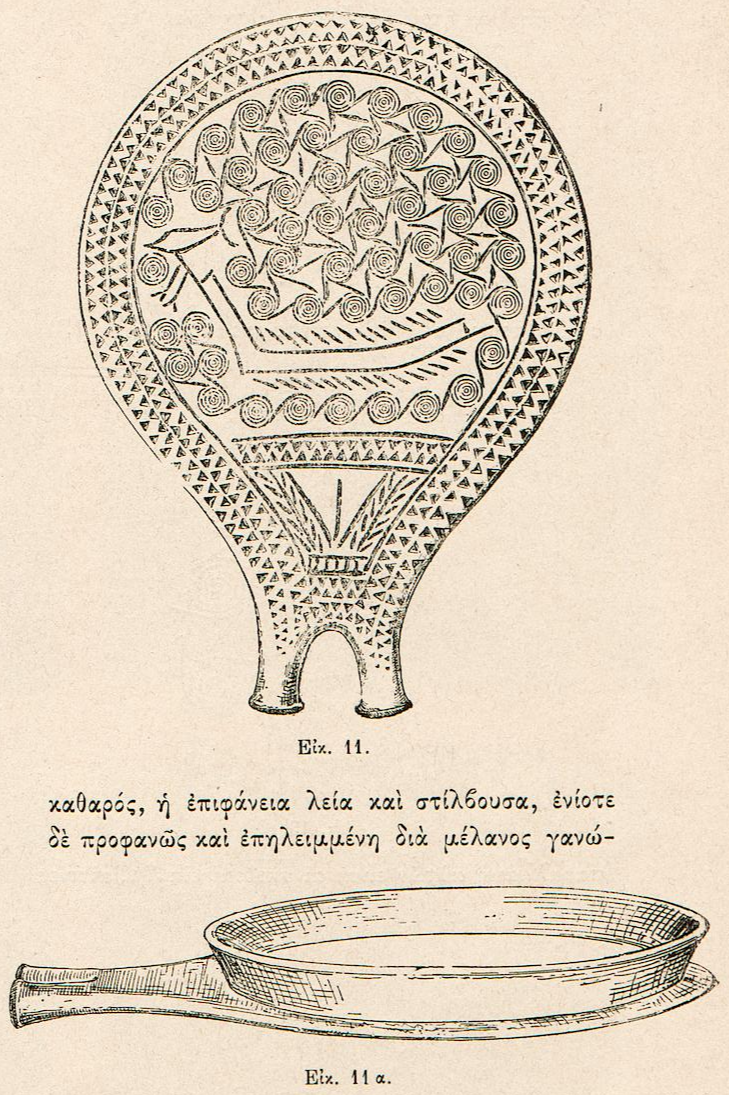
Decorated reverse and view from above, 1899

The frying pan is 20.1 cm across and 28.2 cm from tip to grip. The plate has a round wall which is undecorated and projects outwards, forming the dish of the "frying pan". The incised decoration on the reverse is very deep. The entire plate, with the grips, is surrounded by a border of chip impressions. At the base of the handle, above the grips is an engraved pubic triangle. It is separated from the main field by another chip border. In the main field, stamped spirals, linked together by engraved lines, surround a ship which is engraved slightly below centre, opposite the handle. The hull and an upward pointing prow are depicted by engraved double lines. There is a fish symbol and two banners on the high prow. Above and below the hull, oars or rudders are suggested by slanting lines - a different number on each side. A unique feature compared to other frying pans is the orientation of the ship. It is the only known depiction of a ship with a high prow, which is usually identified as the bow, at the left end.

Except for a broken edge of the rim about 10 cm long, the frying pan is fully intact. It is made of a dark red, strong and coarse-grained clay. The slip on the outside is well-applied, but slightly spotty. On the inside, it is darker.

The quality of the work has been considered to be "accomplished with great care and skill.

== Meaning ==
Frying pans of the "Chalandriani type" are part of the final development of this form of ceramics and are dated to FC II. Their predecessors of the "Aplomata type" differ clearly in the tendency to circular bodies and in grip shape. By contrast, the frying pans of the "Chalandriani type" have an oval body and usually have little footed handles. The decorations known from the "Aplomata type," like star motifs and interconnected spirals are often added to depictions of ships on spiral backgrounds.

At least ten frying pans with depictions of ships are known from the cemetery of Syros; one example has two ships. The individual ship depictions appear to be the product of only a few artists.

Chalandriani frying pans are further decorated with carving in the form of female genitalia, the so-called "pubic triangle." Normally this takes the form of a triangular pattern with a central vertical line at the base of the handle. Examples are even known on the other side of the handle.

== Bibliography ==
- Jörg Rambach (2000). Kykladen I. Die frühe Bronzezeit – Grab- und Siedlungsbefunde. Bonn: Habelt. p. 76. ISBN 3-7749-2831-2. Table 28
- John E. Coleman (1985). ""Frying Pans" of the Early Bronze Age Aegean". American Journal of Archaeology. Vol. 89, no. 2. p. 208.
- Jürgen Thimme, ed. (1976). Kunst und Kultur der Kykladeninseln im 3. Jahrtausend vor Christus. C. F. Müller, Karlsruhe. pp. 111, 116. ISBN 3-7880-9568-7.
- Christos Tsountas: Kykladika II In: Hē En Athēnais Archaiologikē Hetaireia (Ed.): Ephēmeris archaiologikē, 1899 pp. 73–134, 86, 90 (Digitalised: S. 85/86)
