= Chip carving =

Style of carving

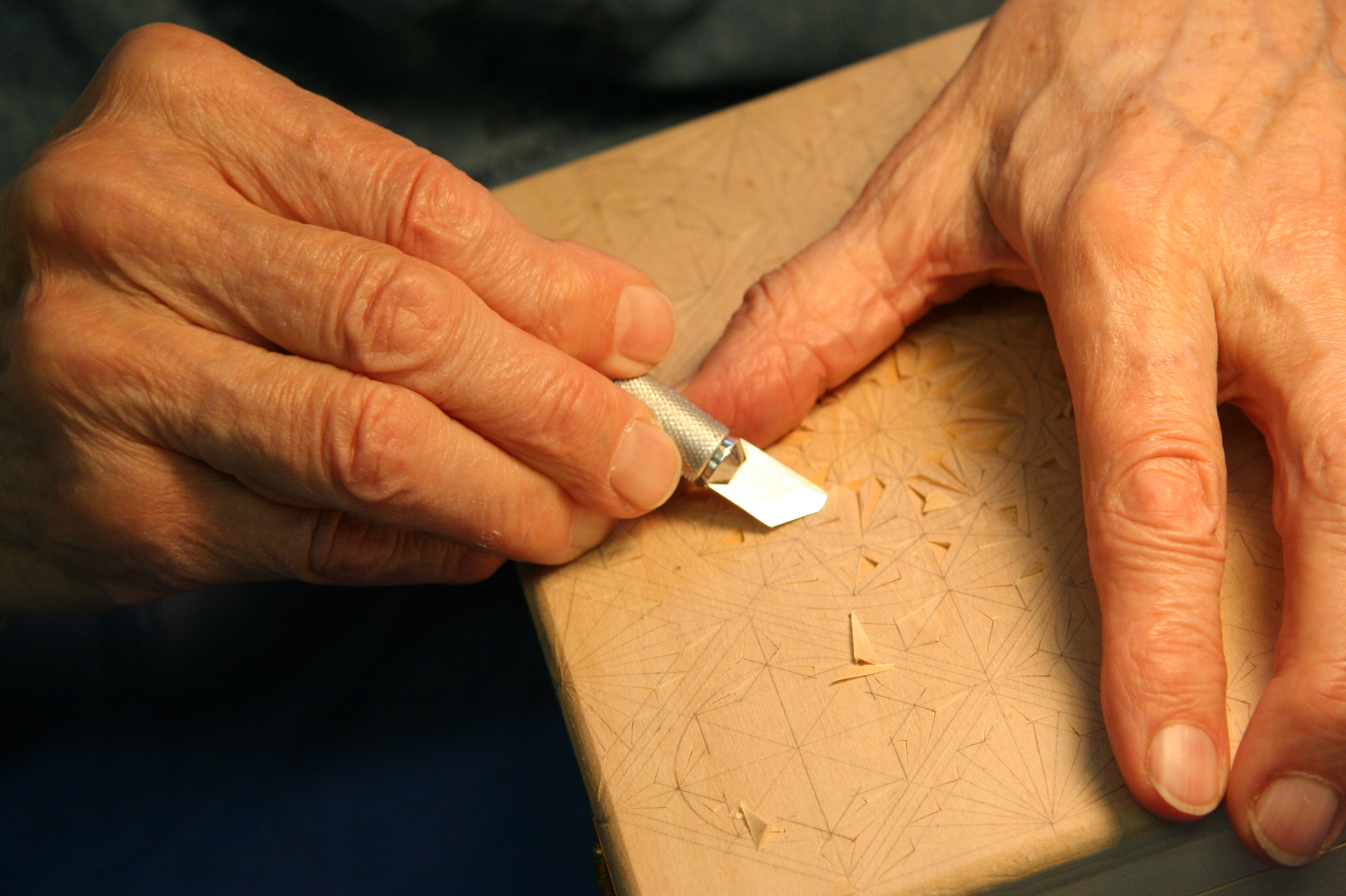
Chip carving in wood

Chip carving or chip-carving, kerbschnitt in German, is a style of carving in which knives or chisels are used to remove small chips of the material from a flat surface in a single piece, usually in a triangular shape. It appears before formal carving in the historical record, and appears to have independently arisen in multiple cultures.

The style became important in Migration Period metalwork, mainly animal style jewellery, where the faceted surfaces created caught the light to give a glinting appearance. This was very probably a transfer to metalworking of a technique already used in woodcarving, but no wooden examples have survived. Famous Anglo-Saxon examples include the jewellery from Sutton Hoo and the Tassilo Chalice, although the style originated in mainland Europe. In later British and Irish metalwork, the same style was imitated using casting, which is often called imitation chip-carving, or sometimes just chip carving (authors are not always careful to distinguish the two), a term also sometimes applied to pottery decorated in a similar way.

== Woodwork ==
In modern wood carving, the style is also called spoon carving. The style is traditional in the folk art of many countries. Patterns can be free form style or based on geometric figures. In America it is mostly used with basswood, butternut, pine, or mahogany. Chip carving knives can also be used for whittling, cabinet making, and general workbench purposes.
