= Christos G. Doumas =

Greek archaeology professor

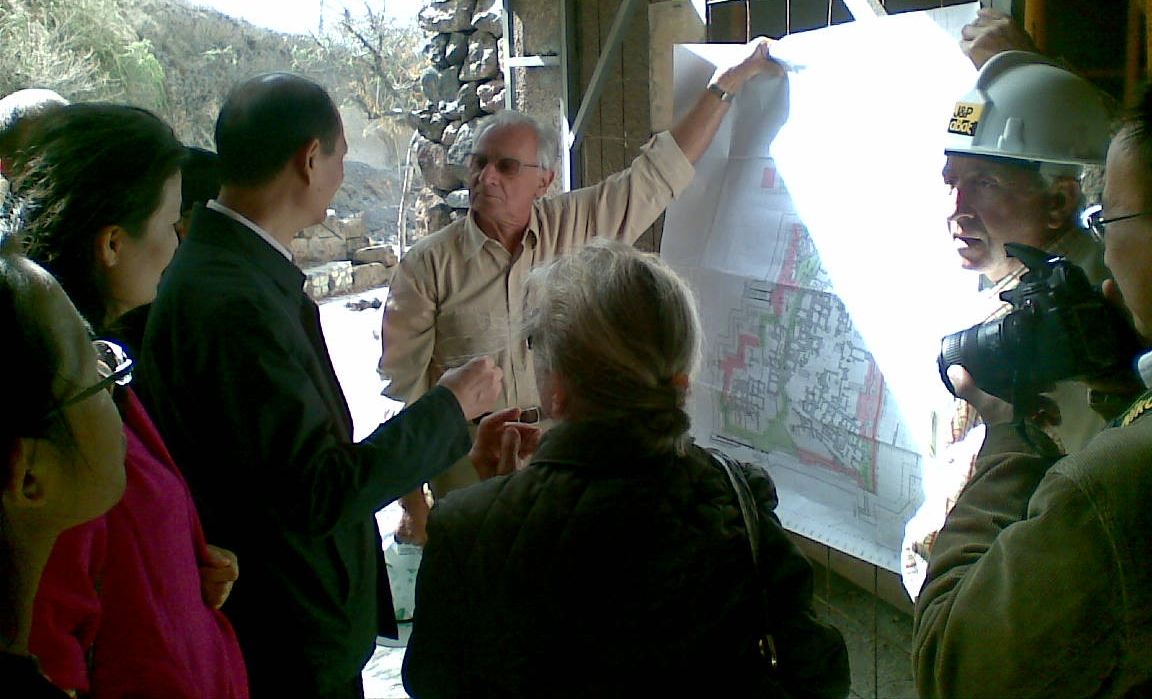
- Christos Doumas interpreting the site of Akrotiri in October 2010 to Luo Linquan
- Born: 1933 (age 92–93); Patras, Greece
- Occupation: Archaeologist
- Known for: Akrotiri excavations

Christos Georgiou Doumas (Greek: Χρήστος Γεωργίου Ντούμας; born 1933), is a Greek archaeology professor at the University of Athens. From 1960 up until 1980, he had a career in the Greek Archaeological Service as curator of antiquities in Attica (on the Athenian Acropolis), in the Cyclades, in the Dodecanese Islands, and in the northern Aegean islands. He conducted excavations and organized many museum exhibitions in different regions of Greece. Doumas also served as curator of the prehistoric collections of the National Archaeological Museum of Athens. Moreover, he became the director of antiquities and the director of conservation at the Hellenic Ministry of Culture. Since 1975, Doumas has been the director of excavations at Akrotiri on the Island of Thera (Santorini), as a successor to Spyridon Marinatos. He published several books and scholarly articles on Aegean archaeology and particularly about the cultures of the Aegean Islands.

== Published works (selection) ==
- Doumas, C.; Papazoglu, L. (1980). "Santorini tephra from Rhodes". Nature. 287 (5780): 322–324. doi:10.1038/287322a0.
- Doumas, C. (1992). The Wall Paintings of Thera. Athens: The Thera Foundation. ISBN 960-220-274-2.
- Doumas, C. (1983). Thera - Scavi a Santorini. London: Thames and Hudson Ltd. ISBN 88-05-03846-6.
- Doumas, C. (1988), "The Prehistoric Aegean Cradle of Democratic Institutions", Patreas, pp. 24–29 (article in greek)
- Doumas, C. (1997), "The Aegean Islands and their Role in the Development of Civilisation" in The Aegean in the Neolithic, Chalcolithic and the Early Bronze Age: Proceedings of the International Symposium, Urla-Izmir, October 13–19, 1997, edited by H. Erkanal, H. Hauptmann, V. Şahoğlu, and R. Tuncel, Ankara University Press (2008), pp. 131–140
- Doumas, C. (1996), "The emergence of central authority in the Aegean" in Paul Sinclair (ed.) The Development of Urbanism from a Global Perspective, Uppsala University, available at https://www.arkeologi.uu.se/digitalAssets/483/c_483244-l_3-k_doumas.pdf
