= Aegean civilization =

Ancient Greek Bronze Age civilizations

Aegean civilization is a general term for the Bronze Age civilizations of Greece around the Aegean Sea. It encompasses the Minoan civilization of Crete, the Cycladic culture on the Cyclades, and the Helladic cultures of the mainland, whose later phases are known as the Mycenaean civilization.

The Aegean cultures shared a common origin in the Early European Farmers who brought agriculture to Neolithic Greece and before 5000 BC. During the Bronze Age, they were influenced by commercial and political interactions with neighbors such as the Egyptians and Hittites, as well as new migrant groups such as those that introduced the Proto-Greek language. Though the cultures showed considerable regional variation, they converged to a common Aegean koine towards the end of the Bronze Age.

== Early European Farmers ("EEFs") ==
Around 5,000 BC, peoples descending from neolithic migrant populations reached the northern European plain in modern-day France and Germany; they reached Britain some 1000 years later.

Once in the Balkans, the Aegean EEFs appear to have divided into two wings: one which expanded further north into Europe along the Danube (Linear Pottery culture), and another which headed west along the Mediterranean (Cardial Ware) into the Iberian Peninsula. Descendants of this latter group eventually migrated into Britain. Previously, these areas were populated by Western Hunter-Gatherer represented by the Cheddar Man.

The Chalcolithic (Copper Age) began in Europe around 5500 BC. Chalcolithic Europeans began to erect megaliths in this period.

== Minoan Civilization ==
The Minoan civilization was a Bronze Age culture centered on Crete. It developed from the local Neolithic culture around 3100 BC, with complex urban settlements beginning around 2000 BC. Minoan art included elaborately decorated pottery, seals, figurines, and colorful frescoes. The Minoans developed two writing systems known as Cretan hieroglyphs and Linear A. Because neither script has been fully deciphered, the identity of the Minoan language is unknown.

Little is known about the structure of Minoan society, and it is unclear whether there was ever a unified Minoan state. Religious practices included worship at peak sanctuaries and sacred caves, but nothing is certain regarding their pantheon. The Minoans constructed enormous labyrinthine civic and ceremonial buildings referred to as Minoan palaces.

After c. 1450 BC, they came under the cultural and perhaps political domination of the mainland Mycenaean Greeks, forming a hybrid culture which lasted until around 1100 BC. Largely forgotten after the Late Bronze Age collapse, the Minoan civilization was rediscovered in the early twentieth century through archaeological excavation. Today, the ruins of the Minoan palaces at Knossos and Phaistos have become popular tourist attractions.

== Helladic Civilization ==
Helladic Greece includes the varied cultures of mainland Greece. These included early cultures such as the Eutresis culture and Korakou culture. A characteristic building type of this period was the "corridor house", of which the House of the Tiles at Lerna is a notable example. New Greek-speaking immigrants arrived around 2200 BC and had a significant impact on the culture of Helladic Greece. The subsequent Tiryns culture eventually grew into the Mycenaean civilization which is known today for its palatial states, urban organization, Mycenaean art, and Linear B writing system. Notable Mycenaean sites include Mycenae, Pylos, Tiryns, and Agios Vasileios.

The Mycenaean palatial centers were destroyed during the Bronze Age Collapse, though aspects of its culture continued as part of Early Iron Age Greece.

== Cycladic Civilization ==
The Cycladic cultures were found throughout the islands of the Cyclades in the Aegean Sea. Early Cycladic cultures such as the Keros-Syros culture and Grotta-Pelos culture were significant commercial and cultural powers in the region. Later in the Bronze Age, the Cycladic cultures were subsumed under the broader Aegean koine. Cycladic art includes folded-arm figurines which became popular collectors objects when they were discovered in the twentieth century, in part because of their resonance with modernist art.

== Periodization ==
=== Mainland ===
- Early Helladic (EH): 3200/3100–2050/2001 BC
- Middle Helladic (MH): 2000/1900–1550 BC
- Late Helladic (LH): 1550–1050 BC

=== Crete ===
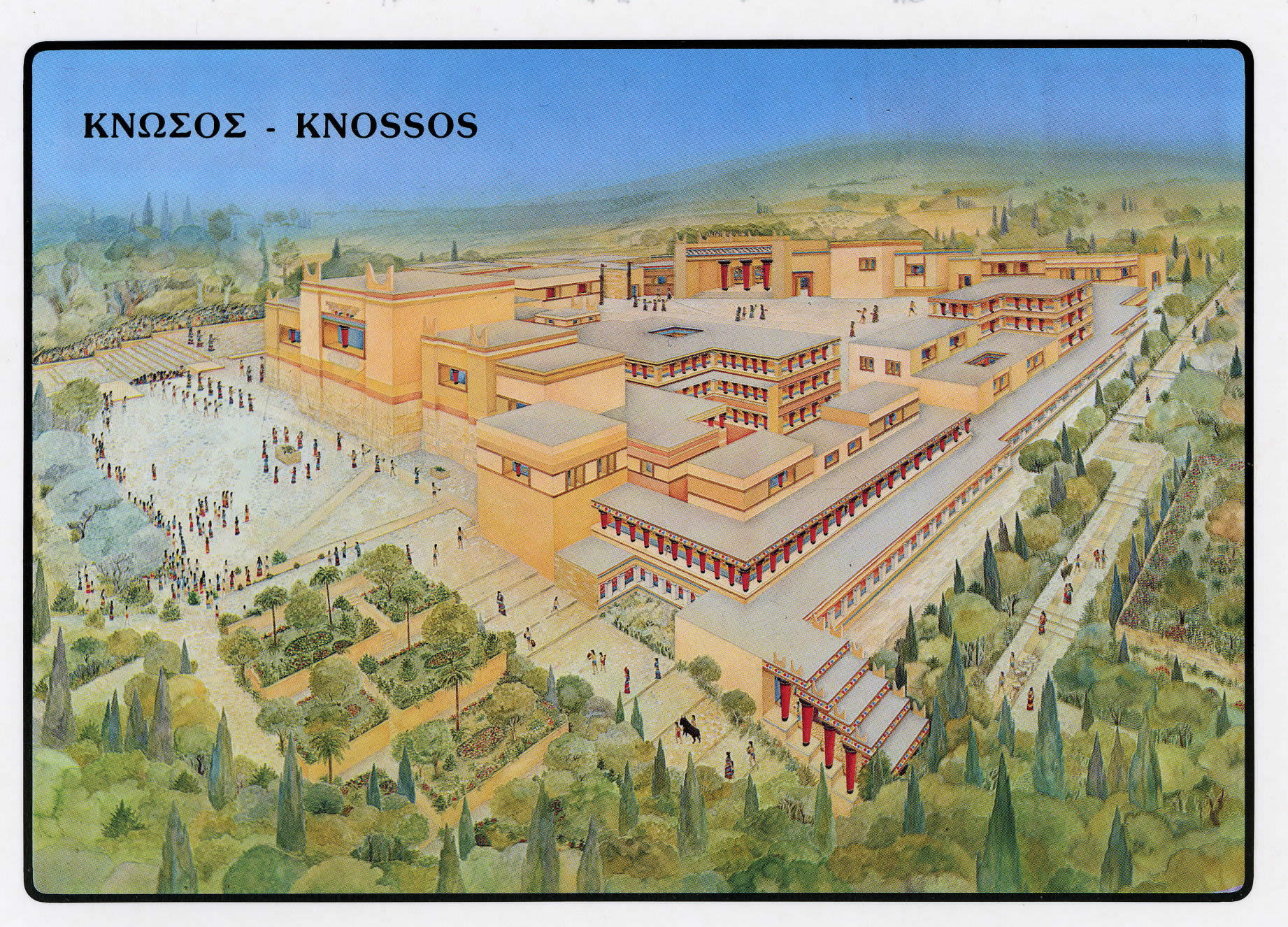
Reconstruction of the Palace of Knossos

- Early Minoan (EM): 3200–2160 BC
- Middle Minoan (MM): 2160–1600 BC
- Late Minoan (LM): 1600–1100 BC

=== Cyclades ===
- Early Cycladic (EC): 3300–2000 BC
- Kastri (EH II–EH III): c. 2500–2100 BC
- Convergence with MM from ca. 2000 BC

== Commerce ==
Commerce was practiced to some extent in very early times, as is shown by the distribution of Melian obsidian over all the Aegean area. Cretan vessels appeared to be exported to Melos, Egypt, and the Greek mainland. In particular, Melian vases, eventually, found their way to Crete. Particularly after 2600 BC, the Minoans traded extensively with Egypt, and Aegean goods found their way to all coasts of the Mediterranean. Standard weights have been found, as well as representations of ingots. Representations of ships are not common, but several have been observed on Aegean gems, gem-sealings, frying pans, and vases. These vases feature ships of low free-board, with masts and oars. Familiarity with the sea is proved by the free use of marine motifs in decoration. The most detailed illustrations are to be found on the 'ship fresco' at Akrotiri on the island of Thera (Santorini) preserved by the ash fall from the volcanic eruption which destroyed the town there.

Discoveries, later in the 20th century, of sunken trading vessels such as those at Uluburun and Cape Gelidonya off the south coast of Turkey have brought forth an enormous amount of new information about that culture.

== End ==
Invasions, destruction and possible population movements during the Late Bronze Age collapse, beginning c. 1200 BC

The final collapse of the Mycenaean civilisation appears to have occurred about 1200 BC. Iron took the place of bronze, cremation took the place of burial of the dead, and writing was lost.

== See also ==
- Mycenaean Greece
- Prehistory of Southeastern Europe
- Poliochne

== Sources ==
- Evans, Arthur John (1929). The Shaft Graves and Bee-Hive Tombs of Mycenae and Their Interrelation. London: Macmillan and Co., Limited.
- Glotz, Gustave (1925). The Aegean Civilisation. Trans. by M. R. Dobie and E. M. Riley. London: Kegan Paul.
- Lambridis, Helle (1929). The Aegeans: The Cretan-Mycenaean Civilisation. Athens, GR: Korais (In Greek).
- Mackenzie, Donald Alexander (1917). Myths of Crete and Pre-Hellenic Europe. London: Gresham Pub. Co.
