= Phylakopi I culture =

Early Bronze Age culture in Greece

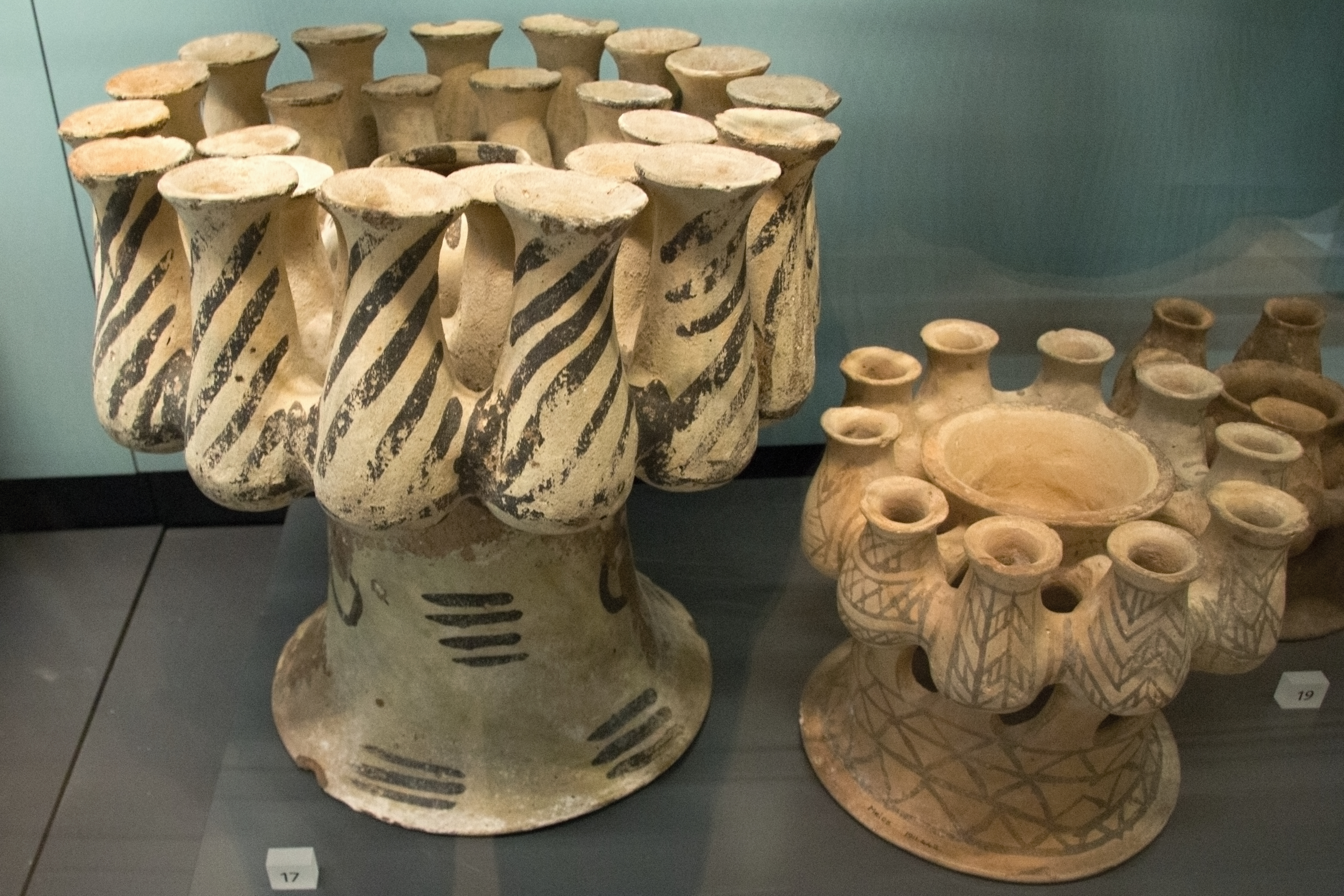
Clay kernoi with linear decoration.

The Phylakopi I culture (Greek: Φυλακωπή, [filakoˈpi]) refers to a "cultural" dating system used for the Cycladic culture that flourished during the early Bronze Age in Greece. It spans the period ca. 2300-2000 BC and was named by Colin Renfrew, after the settlement of Phylakopi on the Cycladic island of Milos. Other archaeologists describe this period as the Early Cycladic III (ECIII).

== See also ==
- Grotta-Pelos culture
- Keros-Syros culture
- Kastri culture
- History of the Cyclades
- Cycladic art
