= Fikiotripa =

Coordinates: 39°06′42″N 26°34′02″E

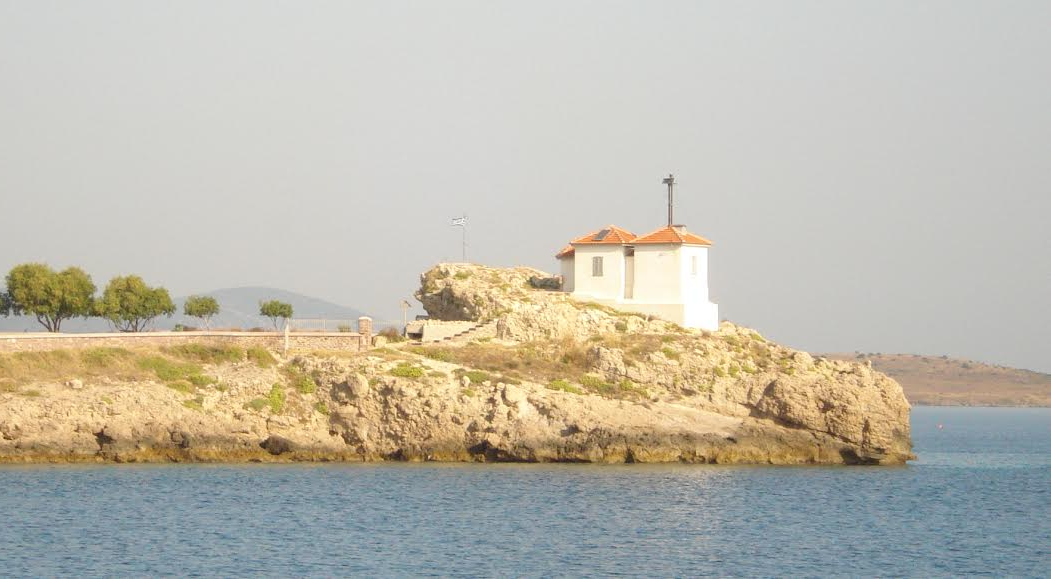
The Fikiotripa lighthouse

The Fykiotripa or Akra Kastro is a lighthouse built at the outer edge of Mytilene, on the island of Lesbos.

== Description ==
It stands on an inclined rock and looks like a boat stranded on the rocky shore. Originally built in 1863, it was renovated in 2007. It secures the approach to the Mytilene port as well as improves the sail between the island of Lesbos and Asia Minor. A small building of 25 m^{2} (270 sq ft), it is a trademark of Mytilene, with unlimited views to the north, east, and south.

== History ==
It is one of the few preserved lighthouses of the North Aegean style. It was built in 1863 when the island was part of the Ottoman Empire. The light emitting components are placed on a steel rod that emerges from the building. After the Greek Civil War it housed the Sea scouts club of Mytilene and afterwards it was used as a military outpost. The lighthouse was recently repaired and is actively used today. It is listed as a historical monument

== Gallery ==
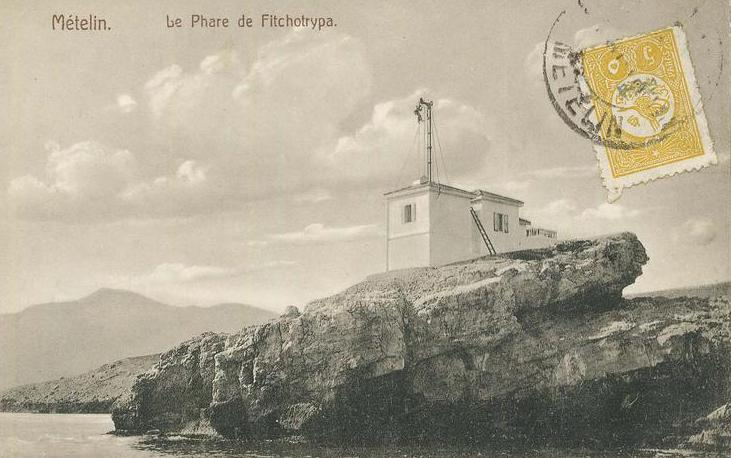
Fikiotripa lighthouse on a 19th-century postal card

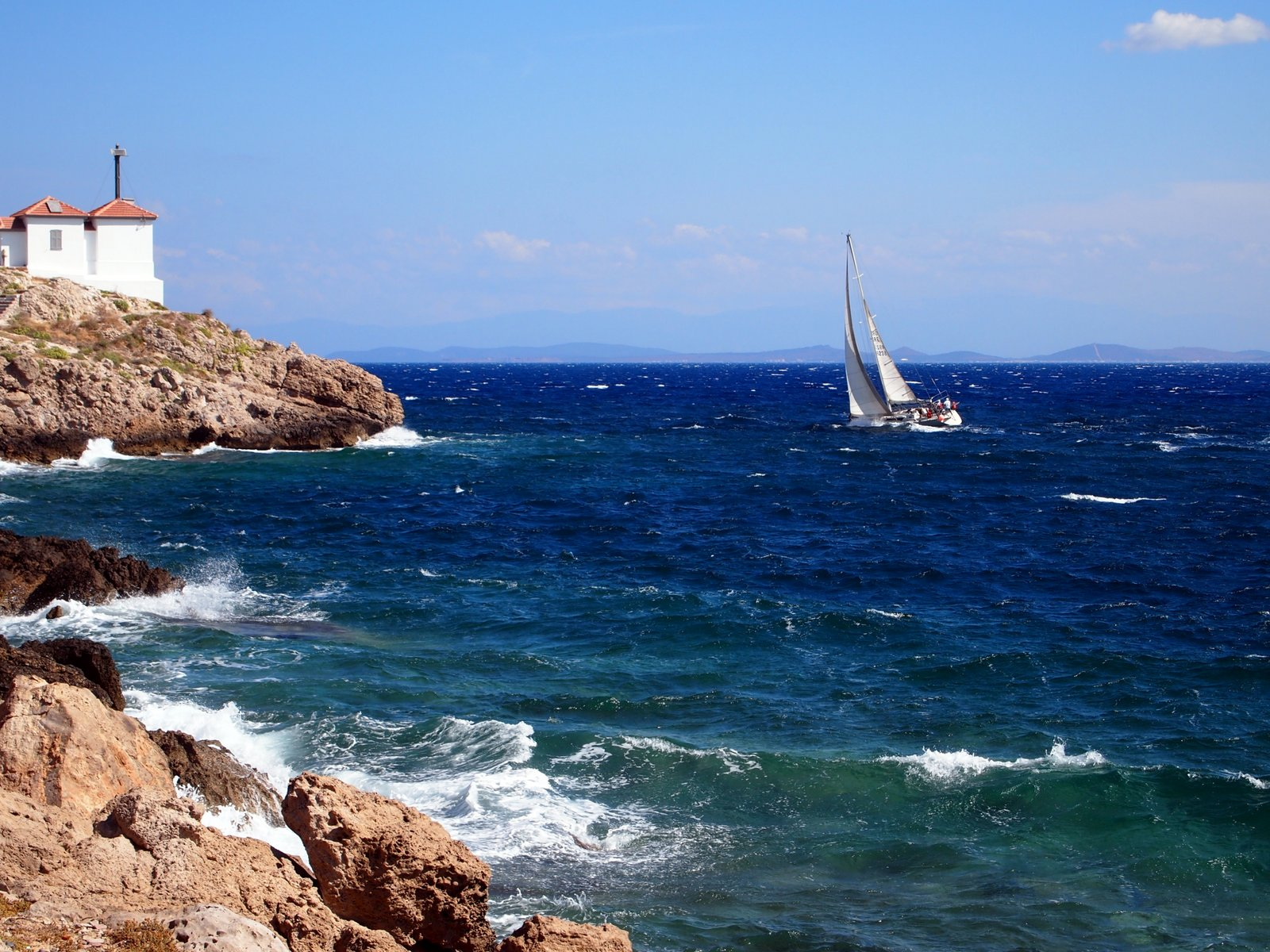
