= Kastri culture =

Cycladic culture dating system

The Kastri culture (Greek: Καστρί) refers to a "cultural" dating system used for the Cycladic culture that flourished during the early Bronze Age in Greece. It spans the period ca. 2500–2200 BC and was named by Colin Renfrew, after the fortified settlement of Kastri near Chalandriani on the Cycladic island of Syros. In Renfrew's system, Kastri culture follows the Keros-Syros culture. However, some archaeologists believe that the Keros-Syros and Kastri cultures belong to the same phase. Others describe this period as the Early Cycladic III (ECIII).

== Anatolian connections ==
There are numerous cultural connections between the settlement of Kastri on Syros, and Anatolia. This settlement provides evidence for the extension of the ‘Anatolian Trade Network’ towards the Cyclades. This trade network went through the whole of Anatolia, as well as Thrace, and towards the Mesopotamia.

Kastri was a small town surrounded by a fortification system with horseshoe-shaped bastions, quite similar to the much bigger fortifications of the same time period at Liman Tepe, on Turkey's western coast near İzmir. Kastri has produced many metal artefacts, so it was probably associated with their production and distribution.

The pottery assemblage from Kastri is also very similar to that of Anatolia. The depas vessels, the bell-shaped cups, and incised pyxides "are entirely Anatolian in character'. The tin bronzes are also quite similar.

Delos (Mt. Kynthos site), Naxos (Panormos fort) in the Cyclades, and Palamari on Skyros are quite similar settlements of the time, and they have also been linked with the ‘Anatolian Trade Network’.

== See also ==
- Grotta-Pelos culture
- Keros-Syros culture
- Phylakopi I culture
- History of the Cyclades
- Cycladic art
