= Keros-Syros culture =

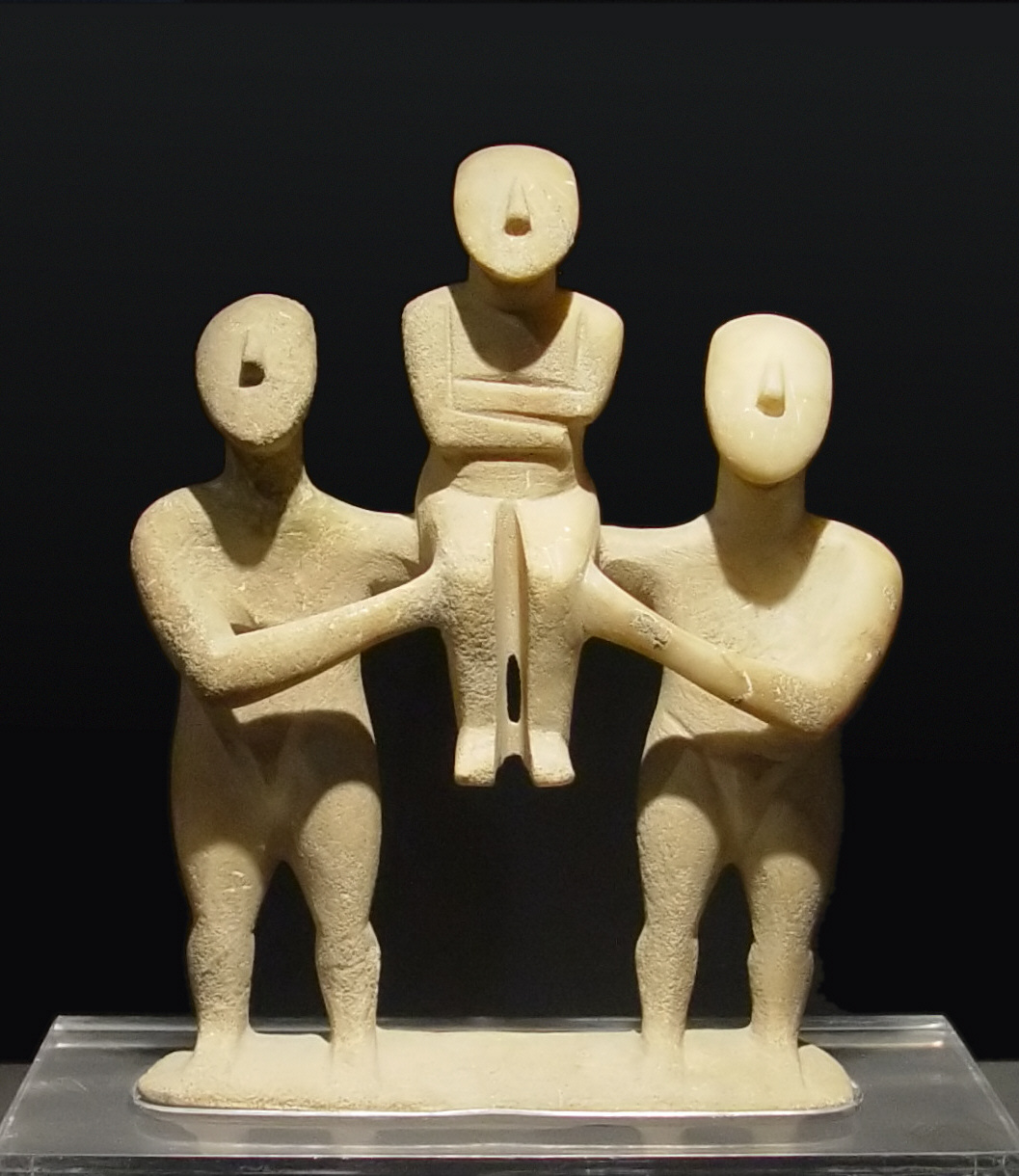
Cycladic figurines, Early Cycladic II period. Badische Landesmuseum in Karlsruhe, Germany

The Keros-Syros culture is named after two islands in the Cyclades: Keros and Syros. This culture flourished during the Early Cycladic II period (ca 2700-2300 BC) of the Cycladic civilization. The trade relations of this culture spread far and wide from the Greek mainland to Crete and Asia Minor.

== Periodization ==
Colin Renfrew has proposed an Early Cycladic subdivision into Grotta-Pelos, Keros-Syros, Kastri, and Phylakopi I periods.

After the Keros-Syros culture, Kastri culture is believed to follow, although this view is not accepted by all. Some researchers in Europe believe that Keros-Syros and Kastri cultures belong to the same phase. Also, sometimes Kastri culture is designated as Kastri/Lefkandi I, because of the similarities with the Greek mainland 'Lefkandi I' phase.

== Important sites ==
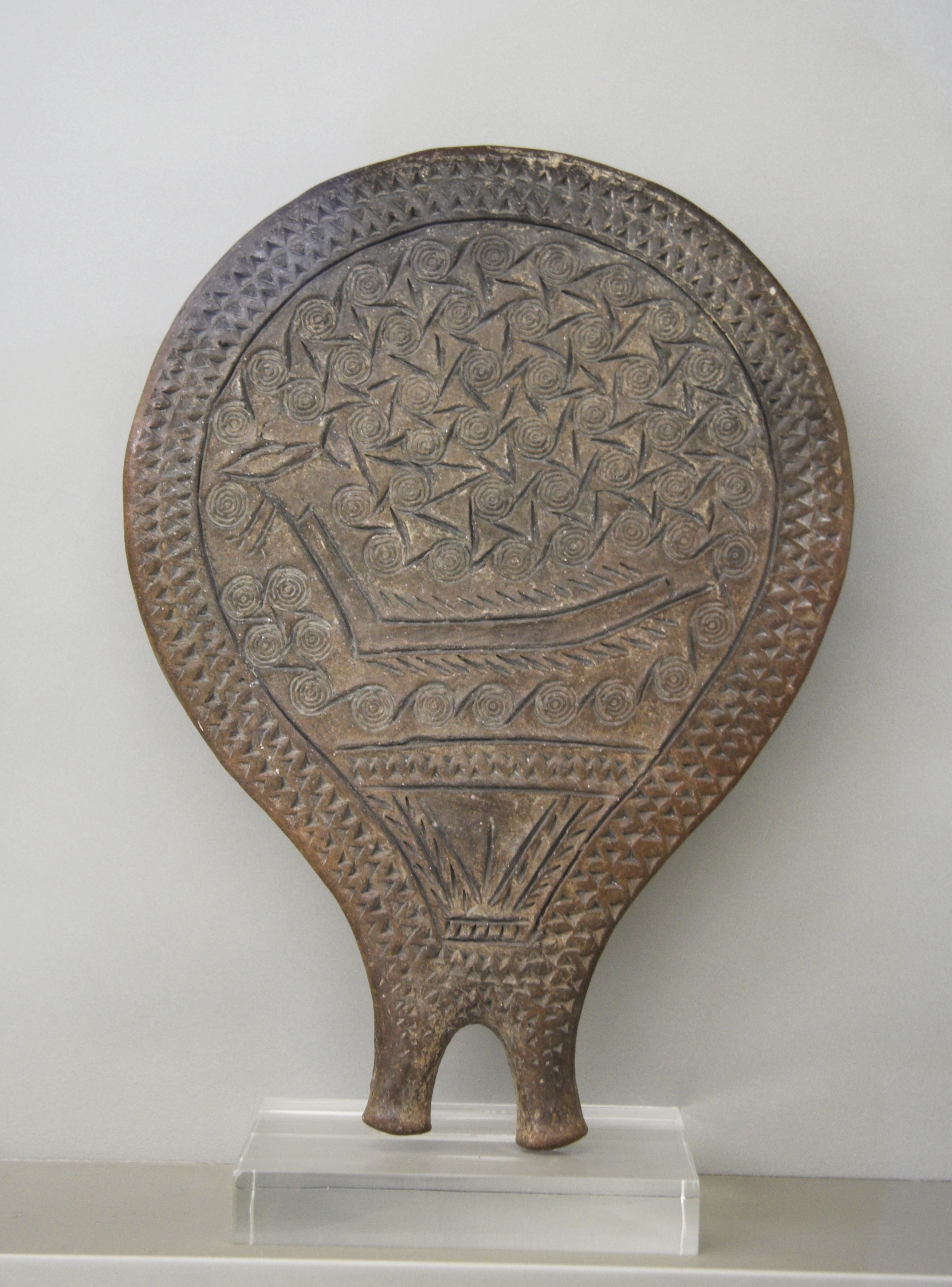
Clay "frying-pan" with ship and fish. From Chalandriani on Syros. Keros-Syros culture. National Archaeological Museum Athens

Keros-Syros culture is well represented by numerous cemeteries on Amorgos (notably Dokathismata) and Naxos (Aplomata, Spedos).

Some of the best preserved sites of this culture are at Kea and Ios, located not far from Keros.

One of the important sites of this culture is Chalandriani at Syros.

Some of the important artifacts of this culture are the so-called "Frying pans" – shallow circular vessels or bowls with a decorated base. They are found especially during the Cycladic Grotta-Pelos and Keros-Syros cultures. It has been suggested that when filled with water they were used as mirrors.

== Use of metal ==
The use of metal became widespread during this period. In all the settlements there were found grave goods in the form of daggers, and also tools such as chisels, tweezers and fishhooks. Also fibulae (brooches) were made of bronze and silver.

Keros-Syros culture is clearly seen as the successor of Grotta-Pelos.

The trade relations of Keros-Syros culture are widespread. They range from the Greek mainland to Crete, where the Cycladic figurines were exported, and imitated by the local artists. Also, the trade went as far as the Asia Minor. Finds at Troy, in the periods of Troy I and Troy II, were also made.

== See also ==
- History of the Cyclades
- Cycladic art

== Bibliography ==
- C. Broodbank, “The Longboat and Society in the Cyclades during the Keros-Syros Culture,” AJA 93(1989) 319-337.
- C. Renfrew and R. K. Evans, “The Early Bronze Age Pottery,” in C. Renfrew (ed.), Excavations at Phylakopi in Melos 1974-77 [BSA Supplementary Vol. 42] (London 2007) 129-180.
- C. Renfrew, "From Pelos to Syros: Kapros Grave D and the Kampos Group," in J. A. MacGillivray and R. L. N. Barber (eds.), The Prehistoric Cyclades (Edinburgh 1984) 41-54.
- J. Rambach, “Note on the Extent of Cultural Continuity on the Cyclades after the ‘Zeit der Wende’ (‘Time of Change’) in the Late Third Millennium BC: the Ceramic Perspective,” in N. Brodie, J. Doole, G. Gavalas, and C. Renfrew (eds.), ORIZON. A Colloquium on the Prehistory of the Cyclades (Cambridge 2008) 291-298.
- C. G. Doumas (ed.), Silent Witnesses: Early Cycladic Art of the Third Millennium BC (New York 2002)
- C. Doumas, “The Aegean Islands and their Role in the Development of Civilisation,” in H. Erkanal, H. Hauptmann, V. Sahoglou, and R. Tuncel (eds.), The Aegean in the Neolithic, Chalcolithic and the Early Bronze Age (Ankara 2008) 131-140.
