= Grotta-Pelos culture =

Dating system used for part of the early Bronze Age in Greece

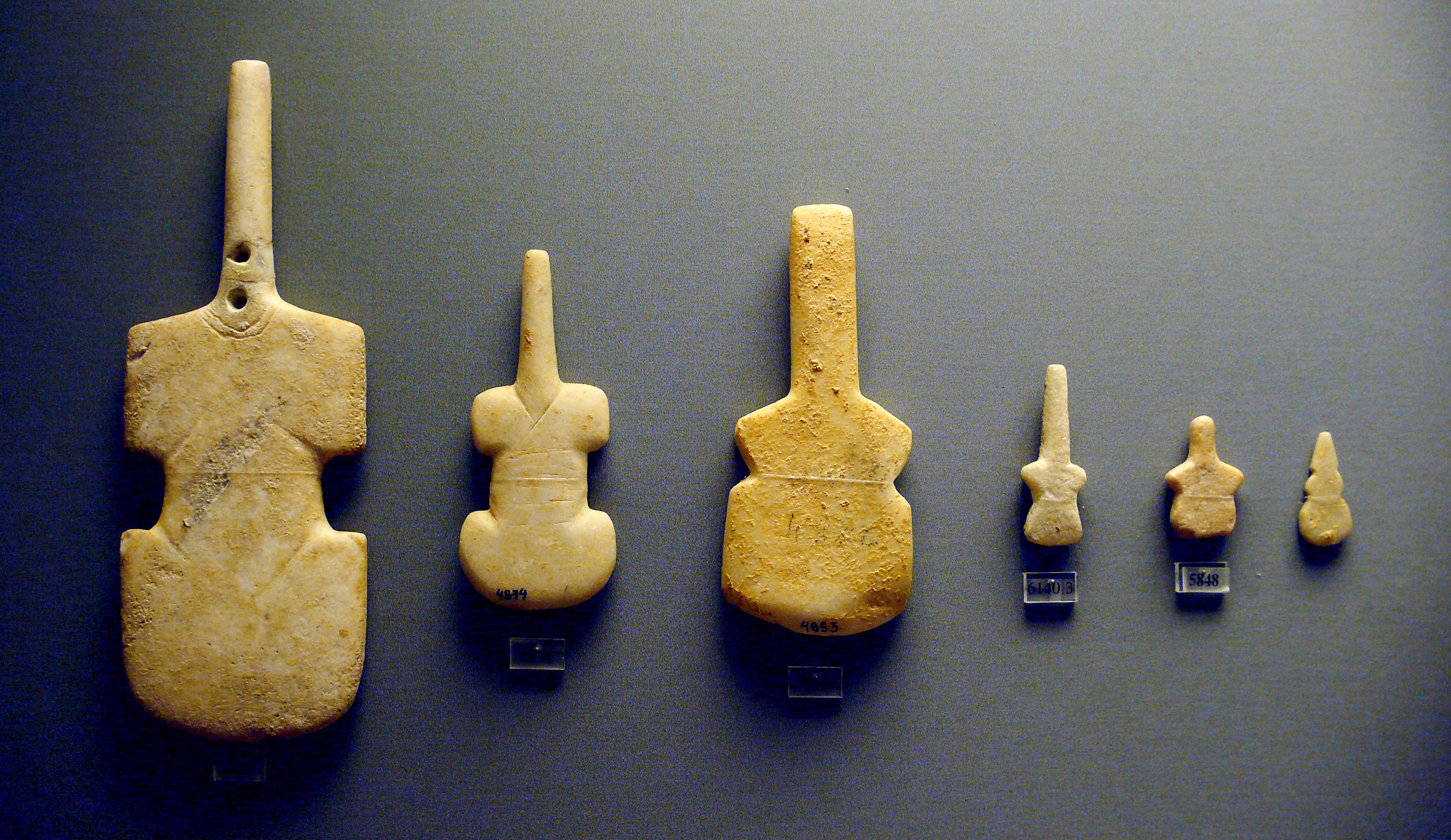
Violin-shaped Grotta-Pelos figurines.

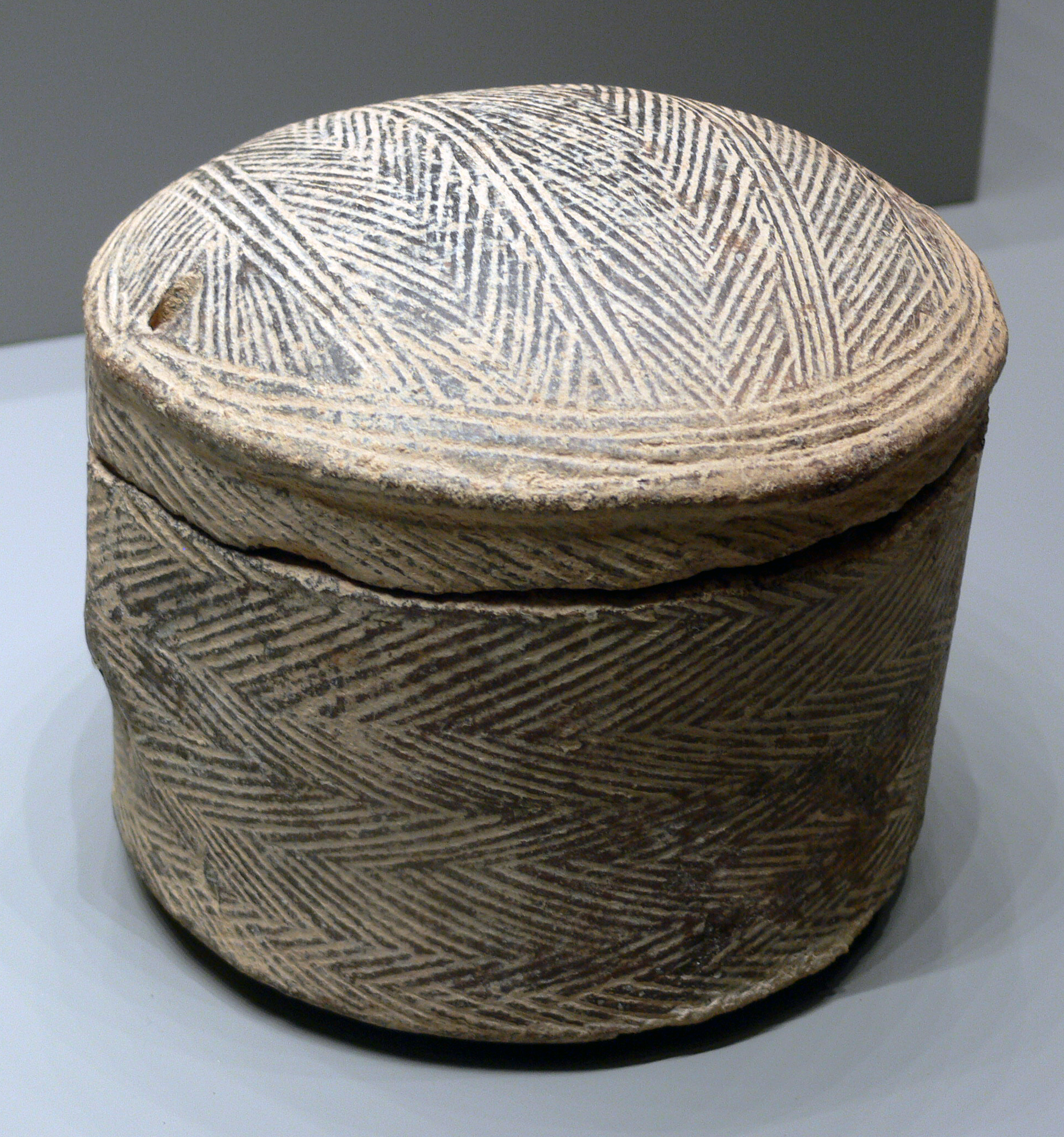
Lidded container with herringbone pattern.

The Grotta-Pelos culture (Greek: Γρόττα-Πηλός) refers to a "cultural" dating system used for part of the early Bronze Age in Greece. Specifically, it is the period that marks the beginning of the so-called Cycladic culture and spans the Neolithic period in the late 4th millennium BC (ca. 3300 BC), continuing in the Bronze Age to about 2700 BC. The term was coined by Colin Renfrew, who named it after the sites of Grotta and Pelos on the Cycladic islands of Naxos and Milos, respectively. Other archaeologists prefer a "chronological" dating system and refer to this period as the Early Cycladic I (ECI).

== See also ==
- Keros-Syros culture
- Kastri culture
- Phylakopi I culture
- History of the Cyclades
- Cycladic art
