= Cycladic art =

Pre-Greek artistic tradition

Cycladic art

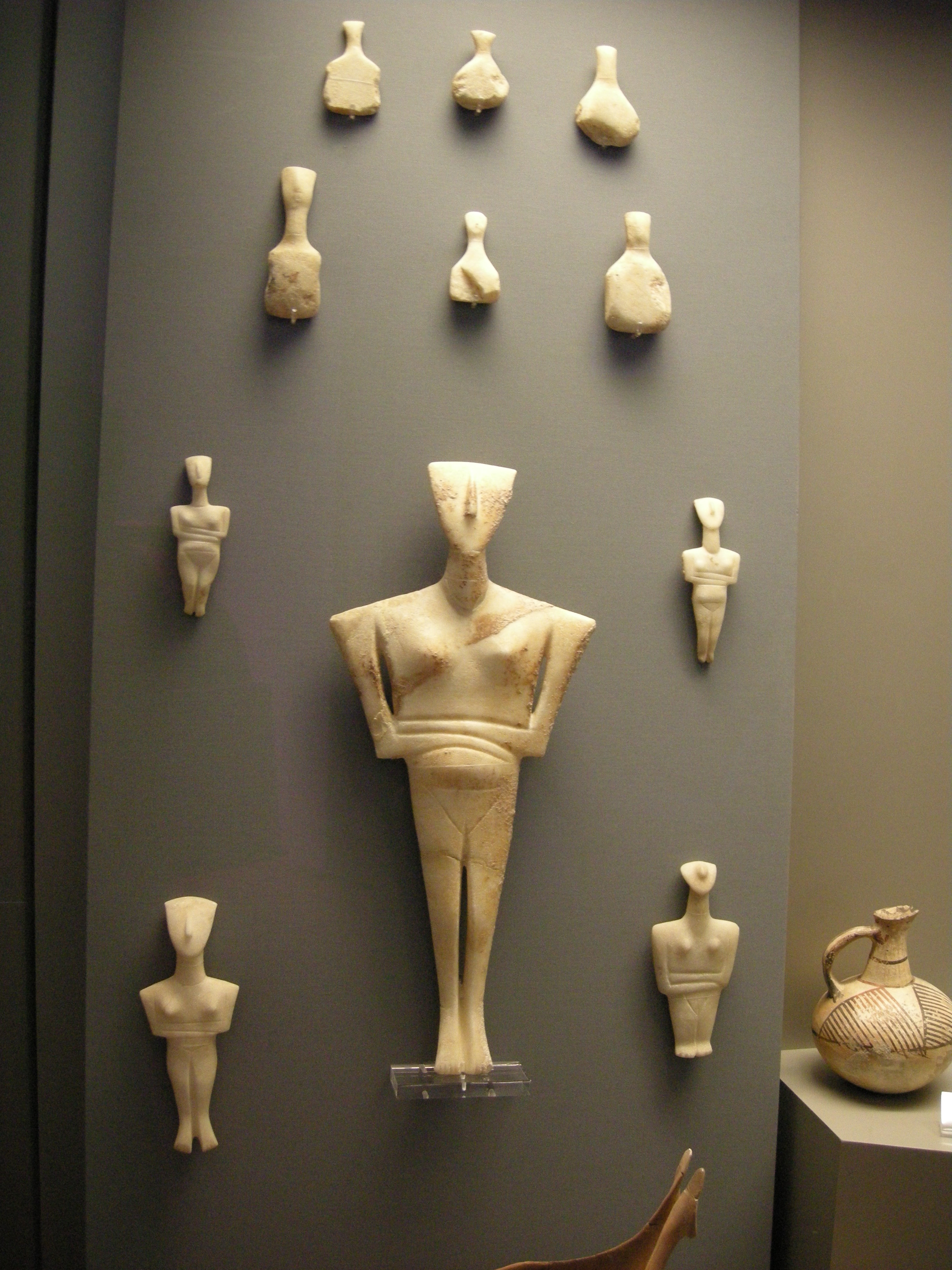
Cycladic figurines, of the FAF type below, in the National Archaeological Museum of Athens

The ancient Cycladic culture flourished in the islands of the Aegean Sea from c. 3300 to 1100 BCE. Along with the Minoan civilization and Mycenaean Greece, the Cycladic people are counted among the three major Aegean cultures. Cycladic art therefore comprises one of the three main branches of Aegean art.

The best known type of artwork that has survived is the marble figurine, most commonly a single full-length female figure with arms folded across the front. The type is known to archaeologists as a "FAF" for "folded-arm figure(ine)". Apart from a sharply defined nose, the faces are a smooth blank, although there is evidence on some that they were originally painted. Considerable numbers of these are known, although most were removed illicitly from their unrecorded archaeological context, which seems usually to be a burial.

== Neolithic art ==
Almost all information known regarding Neolithic art of the Cyclades comes from the excavation site of Saliagos off Antiparos. Pottery of this period is similar to that of Crete and the Greek mainland. Sinclair Hood writes: "A distinctive shape is a bowl on a high foot comparable with a type which occurs in the mainland Late Neolithic."

== Cycladic sculptures ==
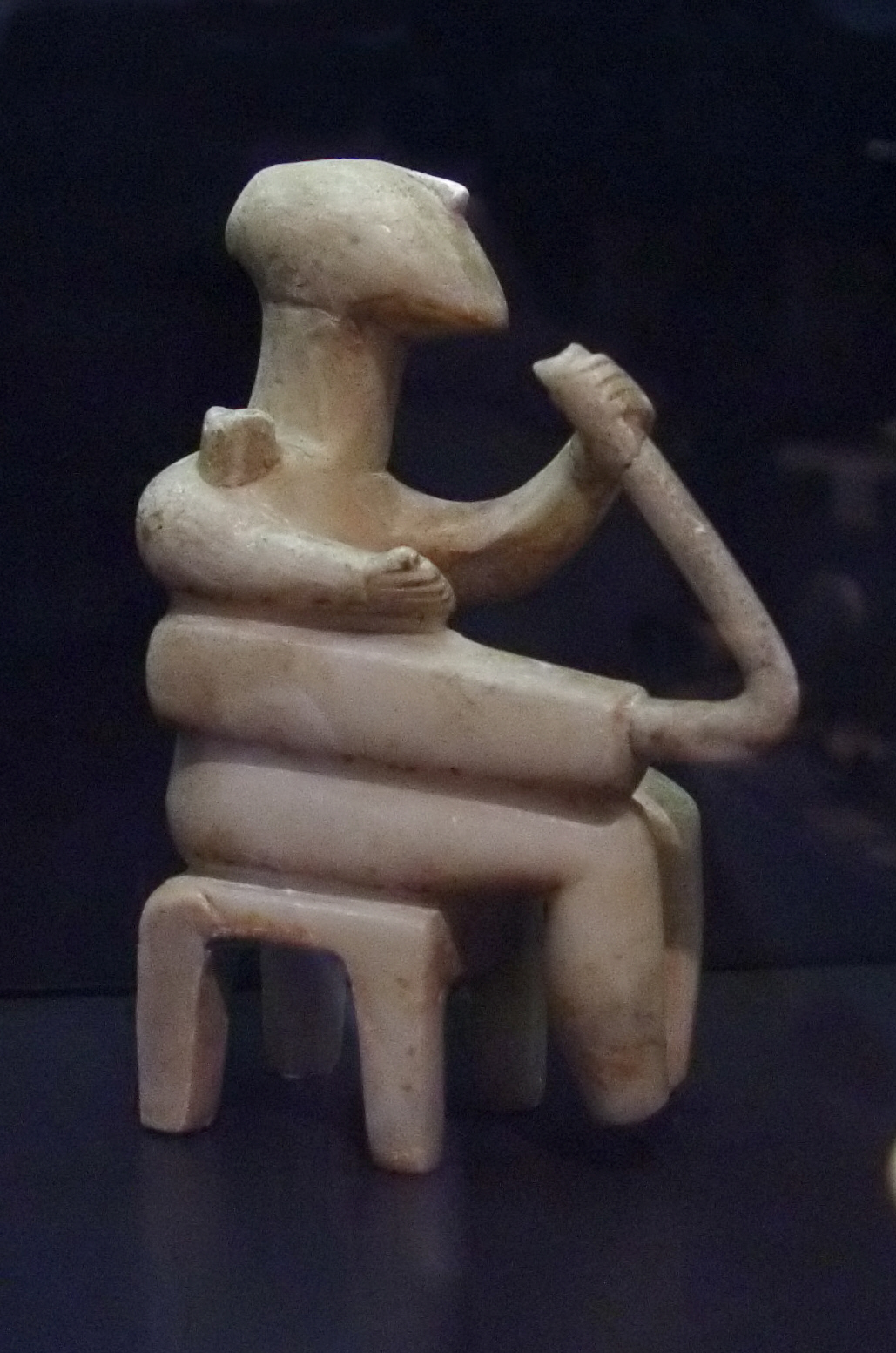
Marble harp Player (EC II; Badisches Landesmuseum, Karlsruhe)

The best-known art of this period are the marble figures usually called "idols" or "figurines", though neither name is exactly accurate: the former term suggests a religious function which is by no means agreed on by experts, and the latter does not properly apply to the largest figures, which are nearly life size. These marble figures are seen scattered around the Aegean, suggesting that these figures were popular amongst the people of Crete and mainland Greece. Perhaps the most famous of these figures are musicians: one a harp-player the other a pipe-player. Dating to approximately 2500 BCE, these musicians are sometimes considered “the earliest extant musicians from the Aegean.”

The majority of these figures, however, are highly stylized representations of the female human form, typically having a flat, geometric quality that influenced some 20th-century modern art. However, this may be a modern misconception as there is evidence that the sculptures were originally brightly painted. A majority of the figurines are female, depicted nude, and with arms folded across the stomach, typically with the right arm held below the left. Some writers who view these artifacts from their own anthropological or psychological viewpoint have assumed that they are representative of a Great Goddess of nature, perhaps in a tradition continuous with that of Neolithic female figures such as the Venus of Willendorf. There is no consensus on their significance. They have been variously interpreted as cult images of the gods, images of death, children's dolls, and other things. One authority feels they were "more than dolls and probably less than sacrosanct idols."

Suggestions that these images were idols in the strict sense—cult objects which were the focus of ritual worship—are unsupported by any archeological evidence. What the archeological evidence does suggest is that these images were regularly used in funerary practice: they have all been found in graves. Yet at least some of them show clear signs of having been repaired, implying that they were objects valued by the deceased during life and were not made specifically for burial. Larger figures were also sometimes broken up so that only part of them was buried, a phenomenon for which there is no explanation. These figures apparently were buried equally with both men and women. Such figures were not found in every grave. While the sculptures are most frequently found laid on their backs in graves, larger examples may have been set up in shrines or dwelling places.

== Early Cycladic art ==
Early Cycladic art is divided into three periods: EC I (2800–2500 BCE), EC II (2500–2200 BCE), and EC III (2200–2000 BCE). The art is by no means strictly confined to one of these periods, and in some cases, even representative of more than one of the Cycladic islands. The art of EC I is best represented on the islands of Paros, Antiparos, and Amorgos, while EC II is primarily seen on Syros, and EC III on Melos.

=== Early Cycladic I (Grotta-Pelos Culture, 3300–2700 BCE) ===
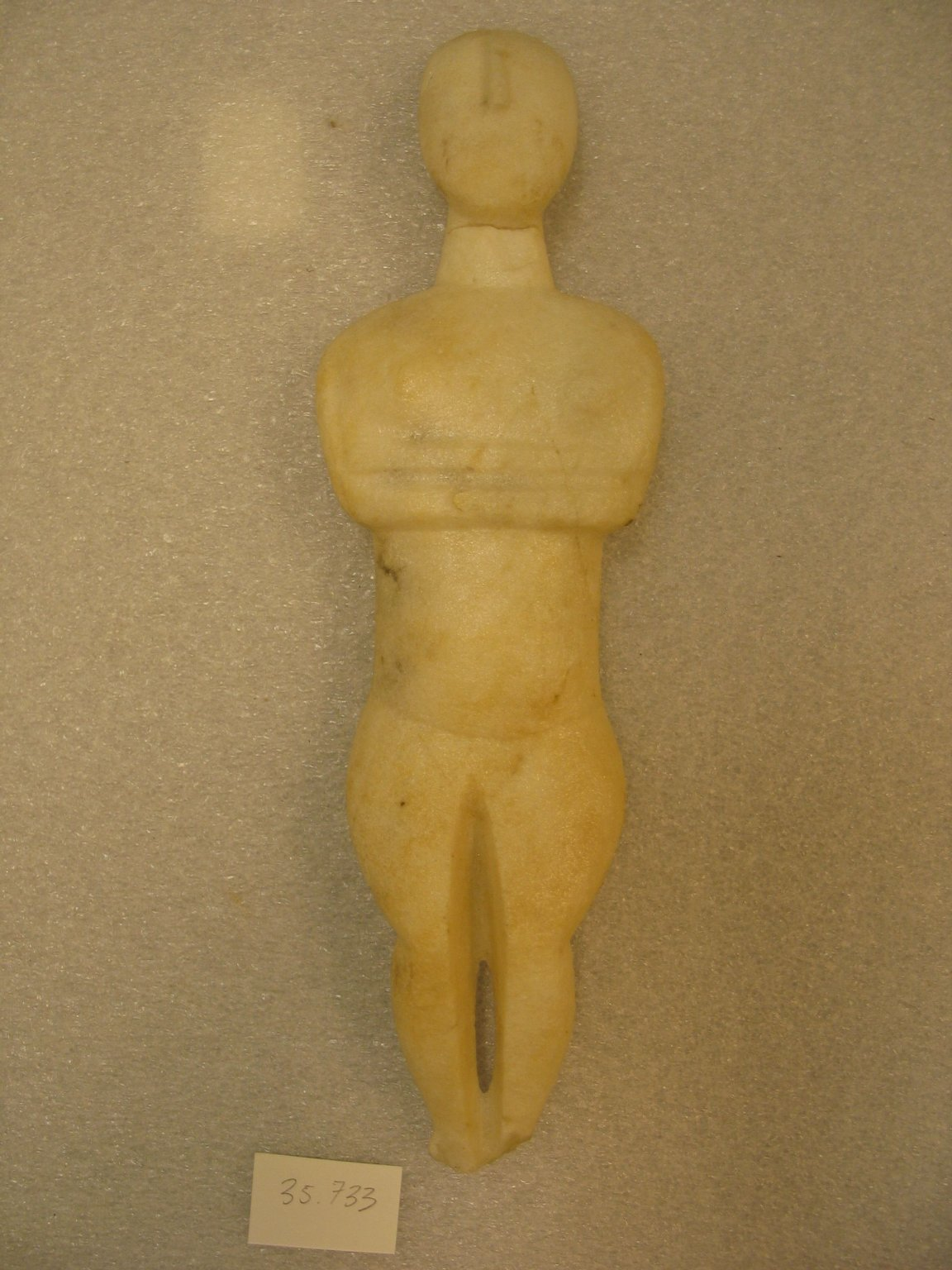
Female marble figure (c. 3000 BCE; Brooklyn Museum)

The most important earliest groups of the Grotta–Pelos culture are Pelos, Plastiras and Louros. Pelos figurines are of schematic type. Both males and females, in standing position with a head and face, compose the Plastiras type; the rendering is naturalistic but also strangely stylized. The Louros type is seen as transitional, combining both schematic and naturalistic elements. Schematic figures are more commonly found and are very flat in profile, having simple forms and lack a clearly defined head. Naturalistic figures are small and tend to have strange or exaggerated proportions, with long necks, angular upper bodies, and muscular legs.

==== Pelos type (schematic) ====
The Pelos type figurines are different from many other Cycladic figurines as for most the gender is undetermined. The most famous of the Pelos type figurines are the "violin"-shaped figurines. On these figurines there is an implied elongated head, no legs and a violin-shaped body. One particular "violin" figurine, has breasts, arms under the breasts, and a pubic triangle. Since not all the figurines share these characteristics, no accurate conclusion can be made regarding their use at this time.

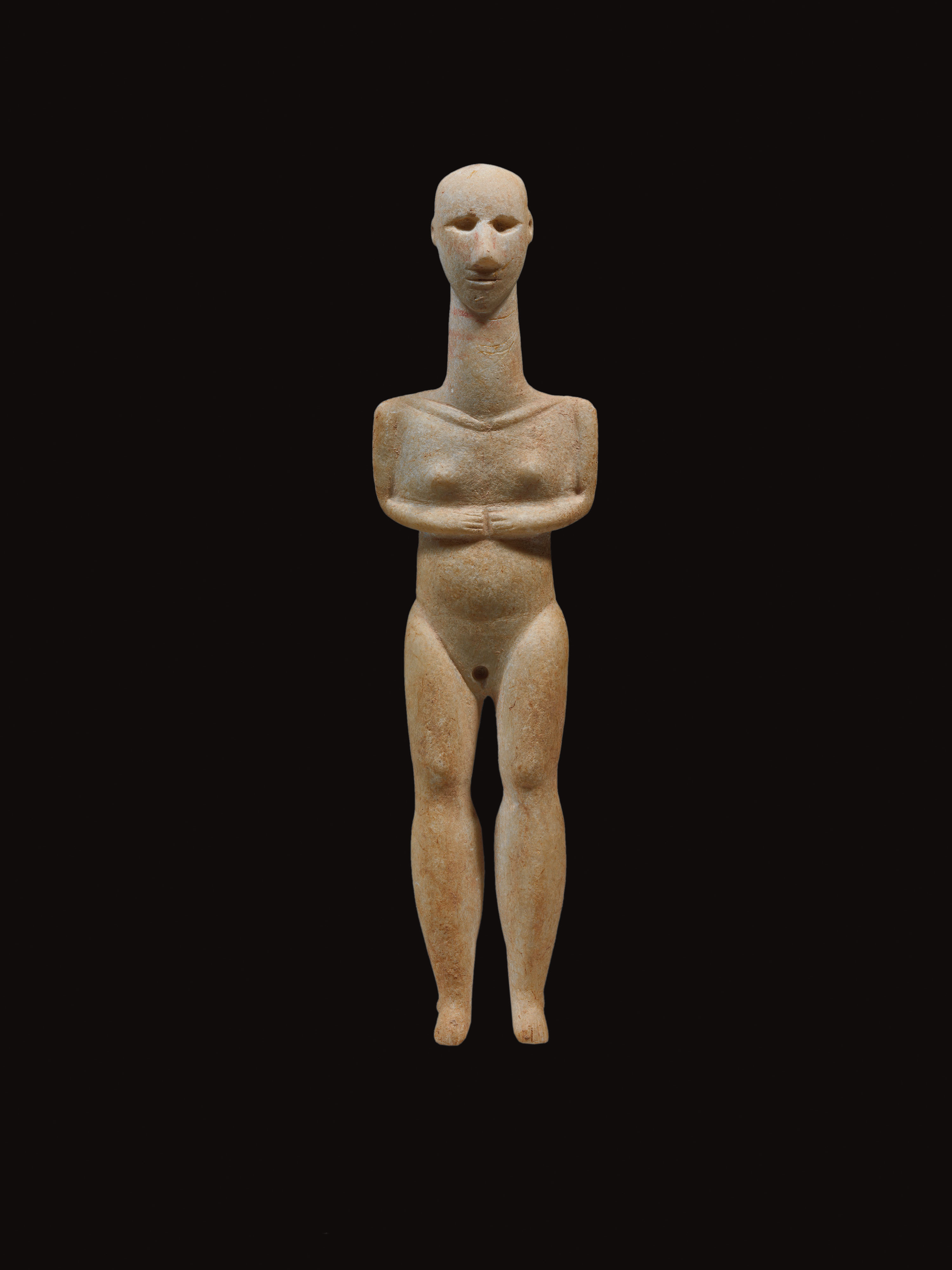
Cycladic marble figurine, Plastiras type

==== Plastiras type (naturalistic) ====
The Plastiras type is an early example of Cycladic figurines, named after the cemetery on Paros where they were found. The figures retain the violin-like shape, stance, and folded arm arrangement of their predecessors but differ in notable ways. The Plastiras type is the most naturalistic type of Cycladic figurine, marked by exaggerated proportions. An ovoid head with carved facial features, including ears, sits atop an elongated neck that typically takes up a full third of the figure's total height. The legs were carved separately for their entire length, often resulting in breakages. On female figures the pubic area is demarcated by an incision and the breasts are modeled. Representations of males differ in structure, but not remarkably, possessing narrower hips and carved representations of the male sexual organs. The figures are typically no larger than thirty centimeters, and are not able to stand on their own, as the feet are pointed. Surviving figurines have been carved from marble, but it is suggested by some that they may also have been carved from wood.

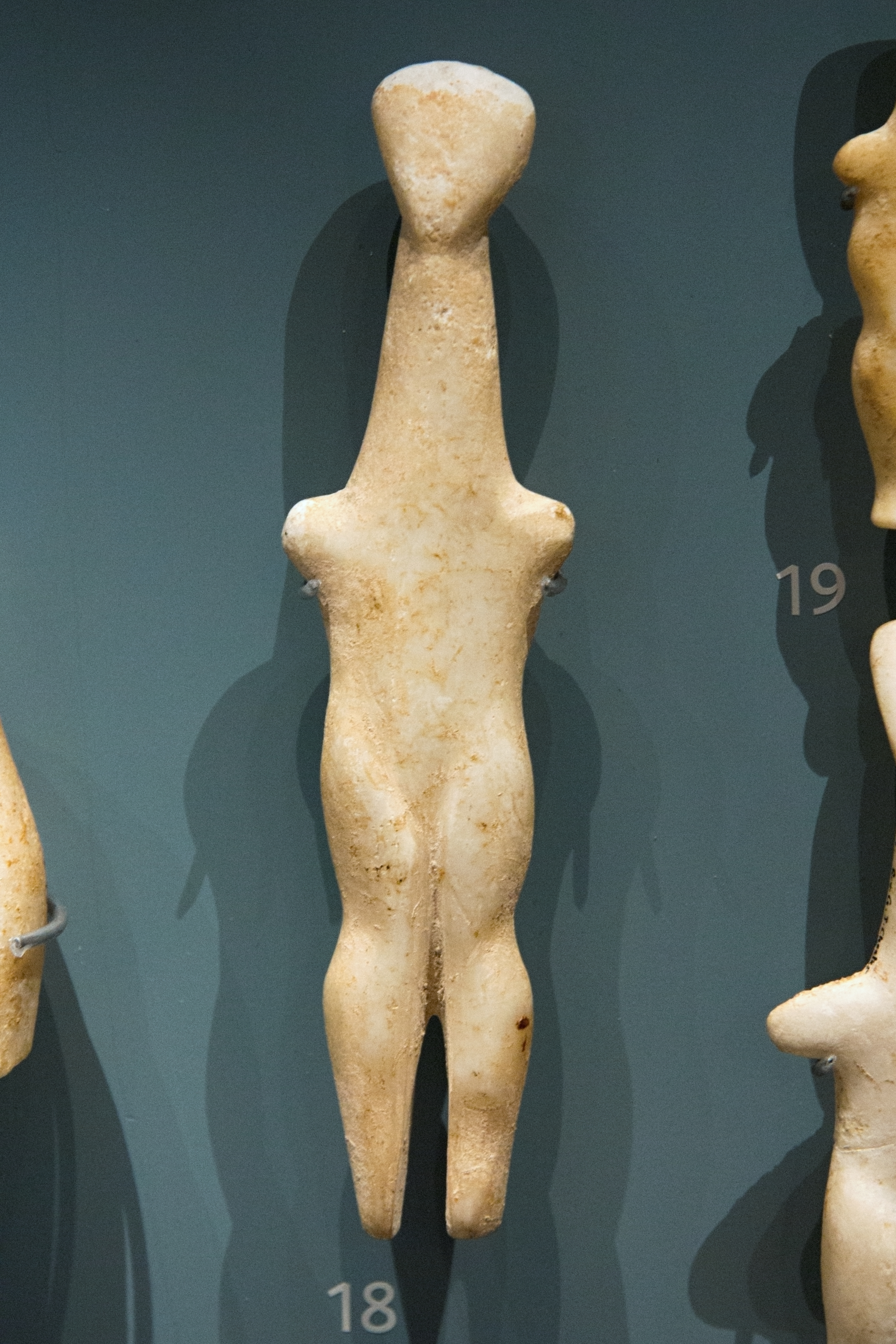
Female marble figurine from Naxos, Louros type (EC I–II, 2800–2700 BCE; Ashmolean Museum, Oxford)

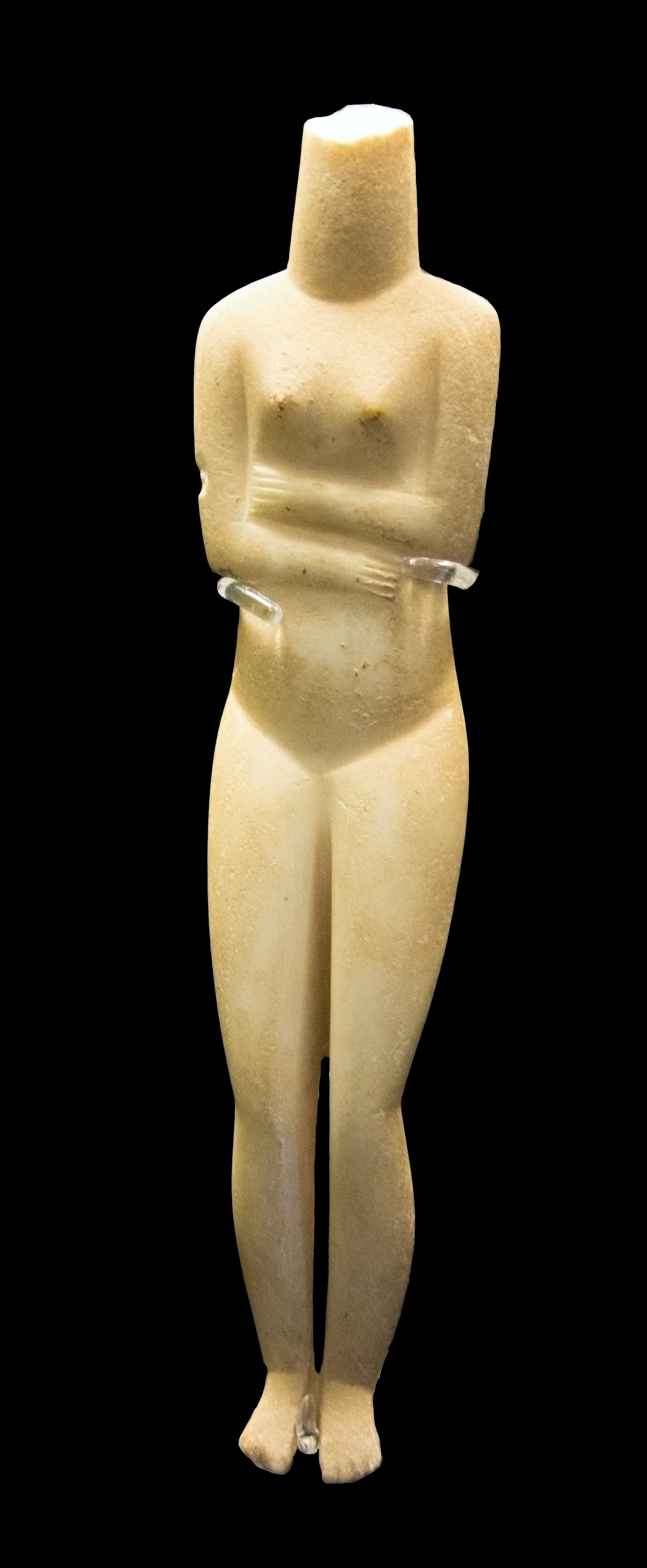
Female marble figurine, Kapsala type (EC II, 2700–2600 BCE; British Museum)

==== Louros type (schematic and naturalistic) ====
The Louros type is a category of Cycladic figurines from the Early Cycladic I phase of the Bronze Age. Combining the naturalistic and schematic approaches of earlier figure styles, the Louros type have featureless faces, a long neck, and a simple body with attenuated shoulders that tend to extend past the hips in width. The legs are shaped carefully but are carved to separation no further than the knees or mid-calves. Though breasts are not indicated, figures of this type are still suggestive of the female form and tend to bear evidence of a carved pubic triangle.

=== Early Cycladic II (Keros-Syros culture, 2800–2300 BCE) ===
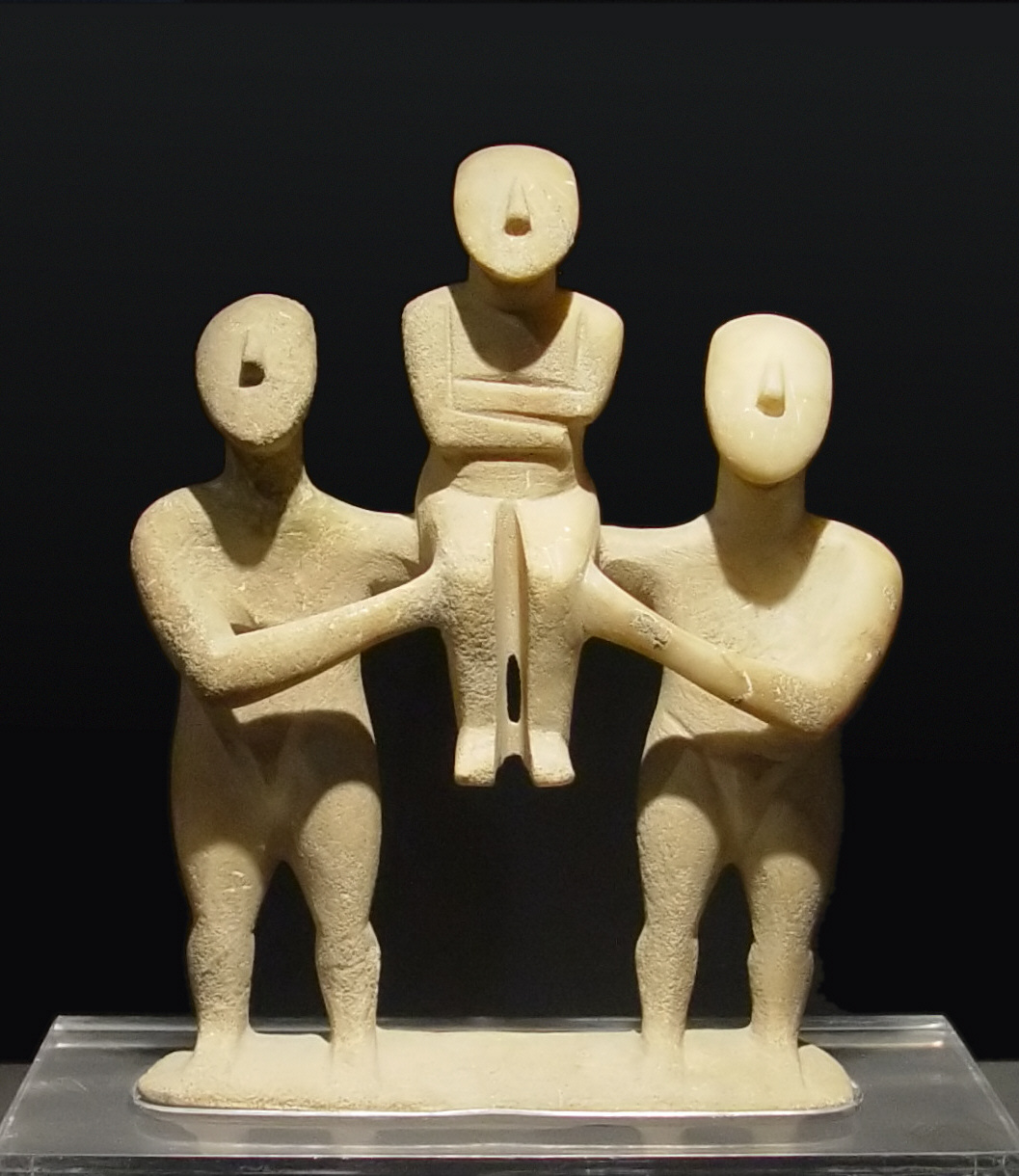
Group of three figurines, early Spedos type, Keros-Syros culture (EC II)

==== Kapsala variety ====
The Kapsala variety is a type of Cycladic figure of the Early Cycladic II period. This variety is often thought to precede or overlap in period with that of the canonical Spedos variety of figures. Kapsala figures differ from the canonical type in that the arms are held much lower in the right-below-left folded configuration and the faces lack sculpted features other than the nose and occasionally ears.

Kapsala figures show a tendency to slenderness, especially in the legs, which are much longer and lack the powerful musculature suggested in earlier forms of the sculptures. The shoulders and hips are much narrower as well, and the figures themselves are rarely larger than 30 cm in length. Evidence suggests that paint is now regularly used to demarcate features such as the eyes and pubic triangle, rather than carving them directly. One characteristic of note of the Kapsala variety is that some figures seem to suggest pregnancy, featuring bulging stomachs with lines drawn across the abdomen. Like other figures of the Early Cycladic II period, the most defining feature of the Kapsala variety is their folded-arm position.

==== Spedos variety ====
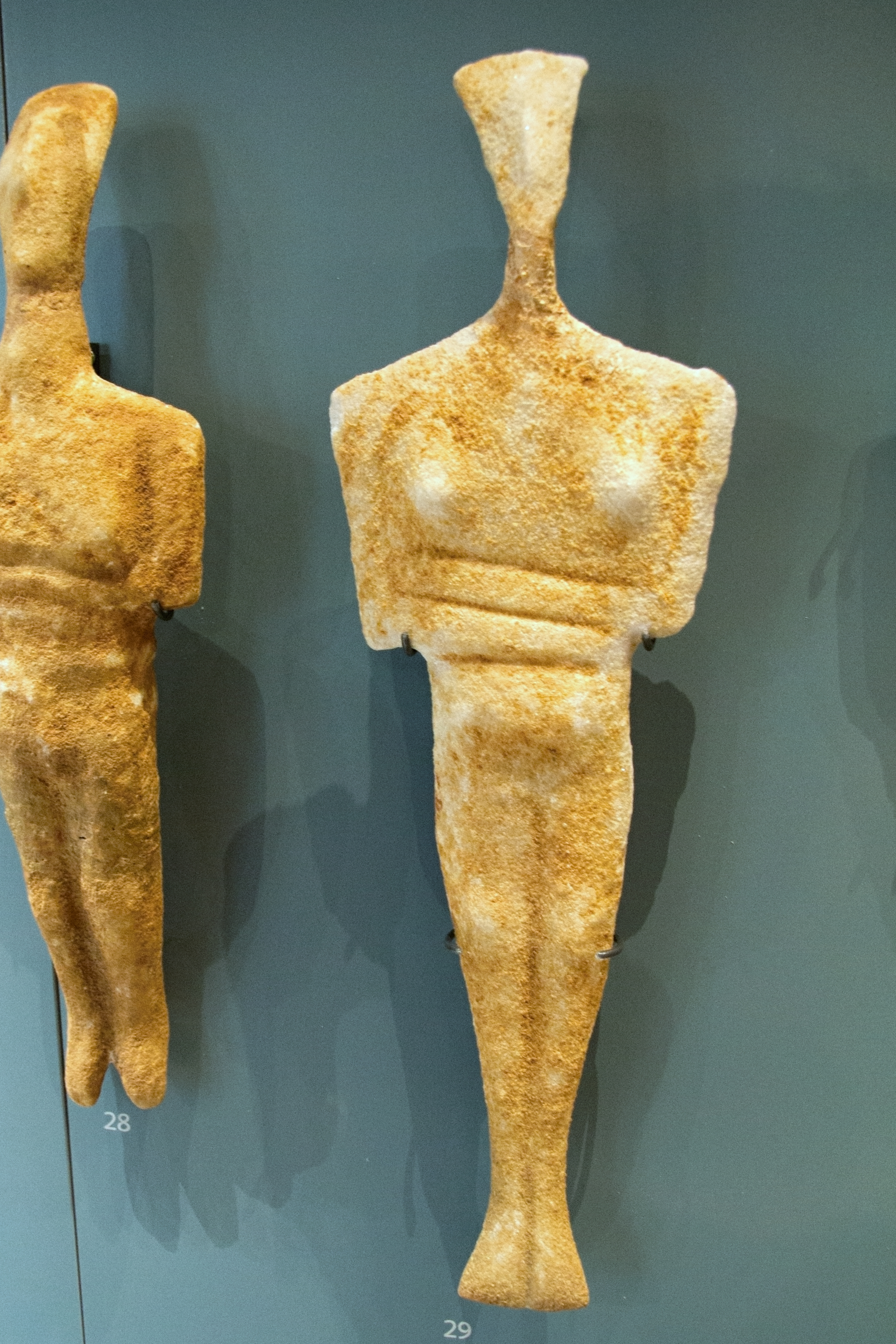
Female marble figurine, probably from Amorgos, Dokathismata variety (EC II, 2800–2300 BCE; Ashmolean Museum)

The Spedos type, named after an Early Cycladic cemetery on Naxos, is the most common of Cycladic figurine types. It has the widest distribution within the Cyclades as well as elsewhere, and the greatest longevity. The group as a whole includes figurines ranging in height from miniature examples of 8 cm to monumental sculptures of 1.5 m. With the exception of a statue of a male figure, now in the Museum of Cycladic Art Collection, all known works of the Spedos variety are female figures. Spedos figurines are typically slender elongated female forms with folded arms. They are characterized by U-shaped heads and a deeply incised cleft between the legs.

==== Dokathismata variety ====
The Dokathismata type is a Cycladic figure from the end of the Early Cycladic II period of the Bronze Age. With characteristics that are developed from the earlier Spedos variety, the Dokathismata figures feature broad, angular shoulders and a straight profile. Dokathismata figures are considered the most stylized of the folded-arm figures, with a long, elegant shape that displays a strong sense of geometry that is especially evident in the head, which features an almost triangular shape. These figures were somewhat conservatively built compared to earlier varieties, with a shallow leg cleft and connected feet. Despite this, the figures were actually quite fragile and prone to breakage. The return of an incised pubic triangle is also noted in the Dokathismata variety of figures.

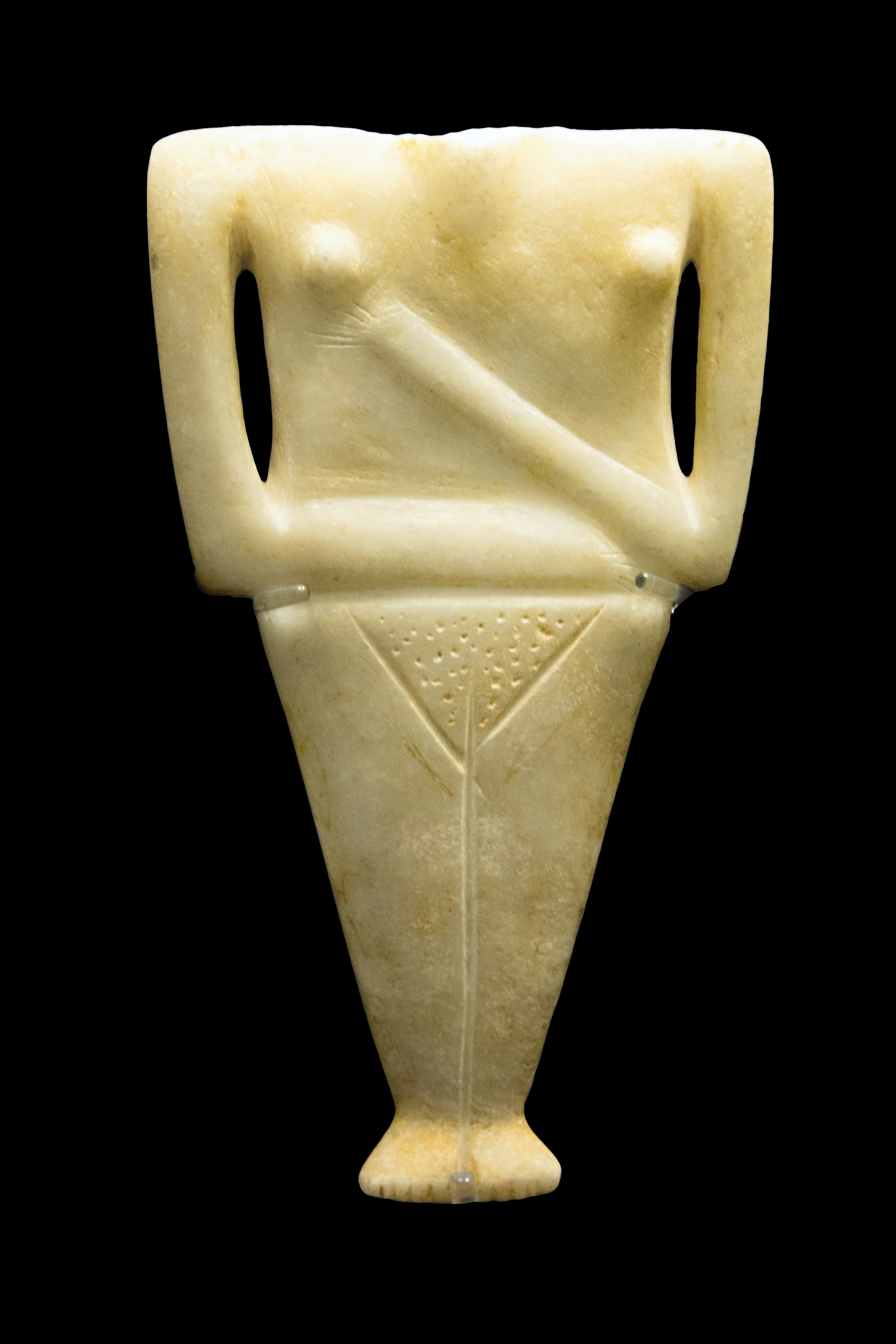
Female marble figurine, Chalandriani type (EC II, 2400–2200 BCE; British Museum)

==== Chalandriani variety ====
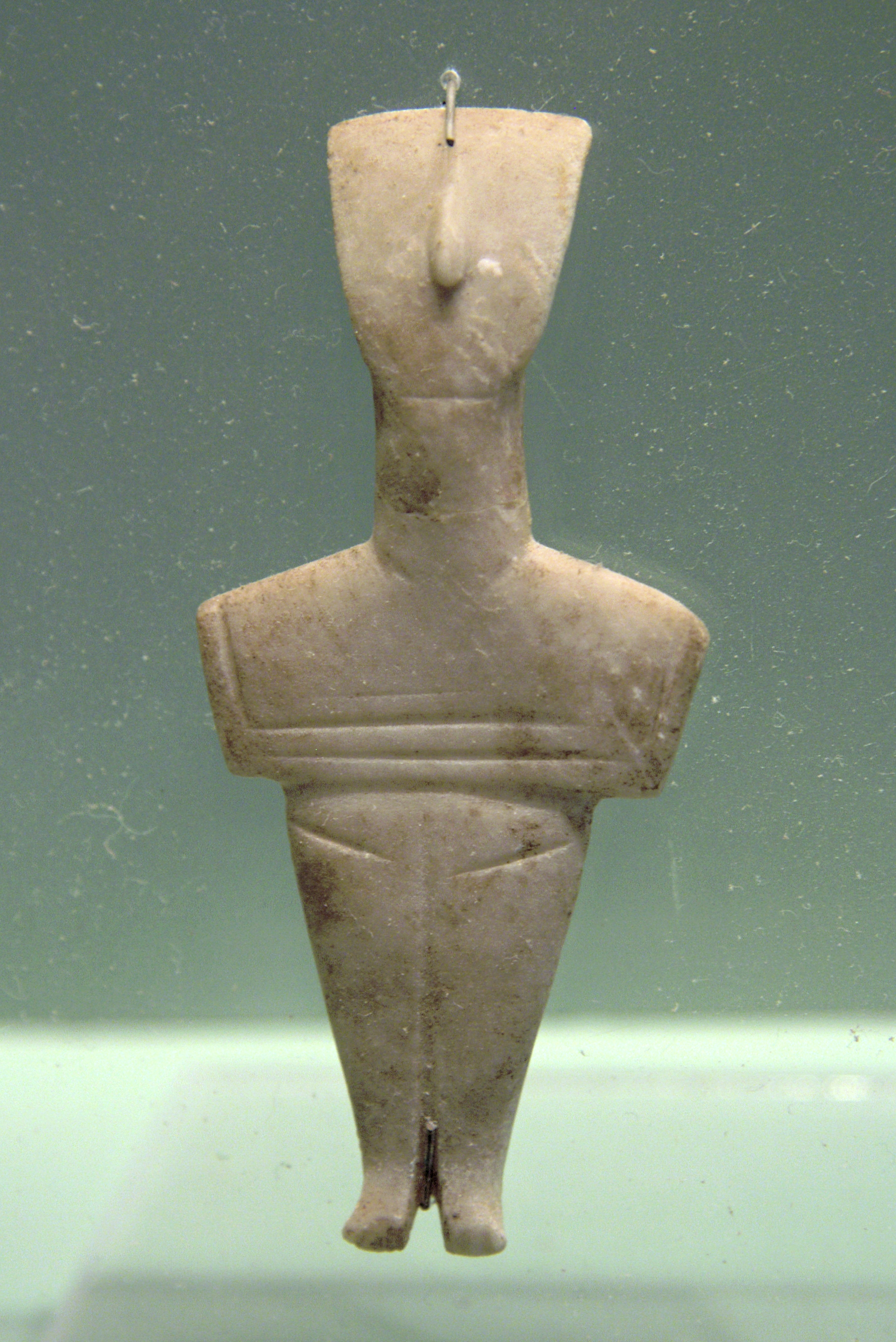
Female marble figurine from Crete, Koumasa variety (EC II, 2800–2200 BCE; Archaeological Museum of Chania)

The Chalandriani variety is a type of Cycladic figure from the end of the Early Cycladic II period of the Bronze Age. Named for the cemetery on the island of Syros on which they were found, these figures are somewhat similar in style and mannerism to the Dokathismata variety that preceded them. Chalandriani figures, however, feature a more truncated shape in which the arms are very close to the pubic triangle and the leg cleft is only indicated by a shallow groove.

One feature of note with the Chalandriani variety is that the strict right-below-left configuration found in previous figures seemed to have relaxed, as some sculptures have reversed arms or even abandonment of the folded position for one or both arms. The reclining position of previous figures is also challenged, as the feet are not always inclined and the legs are somewhat rigid. The shoulders were expanded even further from the Dokathismata variety and were quite susceptible to damage as the upper arms and shoulders are also the thinnest point of the sculpture. The head is triangular or shield-shaped with few facial features other than a prominent nose, connected to the body by a pyramidal-shaped neck. Like figures of the Dokathismata variety, some Chalandriani figures appear to be presented as pregnant. The defining feature of these figures is their bold and exaggerated indication of the shoulders and upper arms.

== Early Minoan examples ==
=== Koumasa variety ===
Koumasa figurines, from the Early Minoan II cemetery at Koumasa on Crete, are very small and flat. The folded-arm figures typically have short legs and broad shoulders, and were prone to breakage given their delicate build.

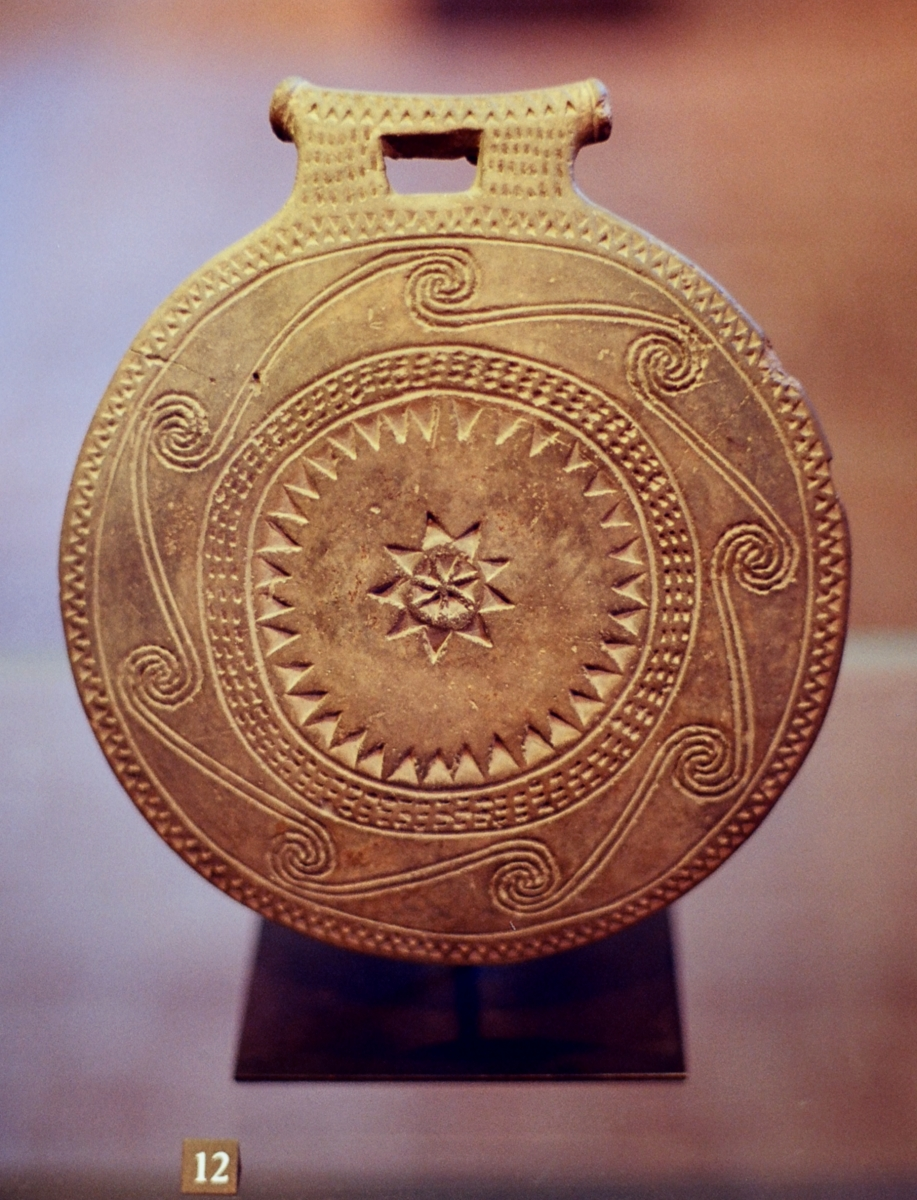
Cycladic “frying pan”, terracotta with stamped and cut spirals decoration (EC I–II, c. 2700 BCE, Kampos phase)

== Pottery ==
The local clay proved difficult for artists to work with, and the pottery, plates, and vases of this period are seldom above mediocre. Of some importance are the so-called 'frying pans', which emerged on the island of Syros during the EC II phase. These are round decorated disks, which were not used for cooking, but perhaps as fertility charms or mirrors. Some zoological figurines and pieces depicting ships have also been found.

Besides these, other forms of functional pottery have been found. All pottery of early Cycladic civilization was made by hand, and typically was a black or reddish color, though pottery of a pale buff has also been found. The most common shapes are cylindrical boxes, known as pyxides, and collared jars. They are crude in construction, with thick walls and crumbling imperfections, but sometimes feature naturalistic designs reminiscent of the sea-based culture of the Aegean islands. There are also figurines of animals.

== Gallery ==
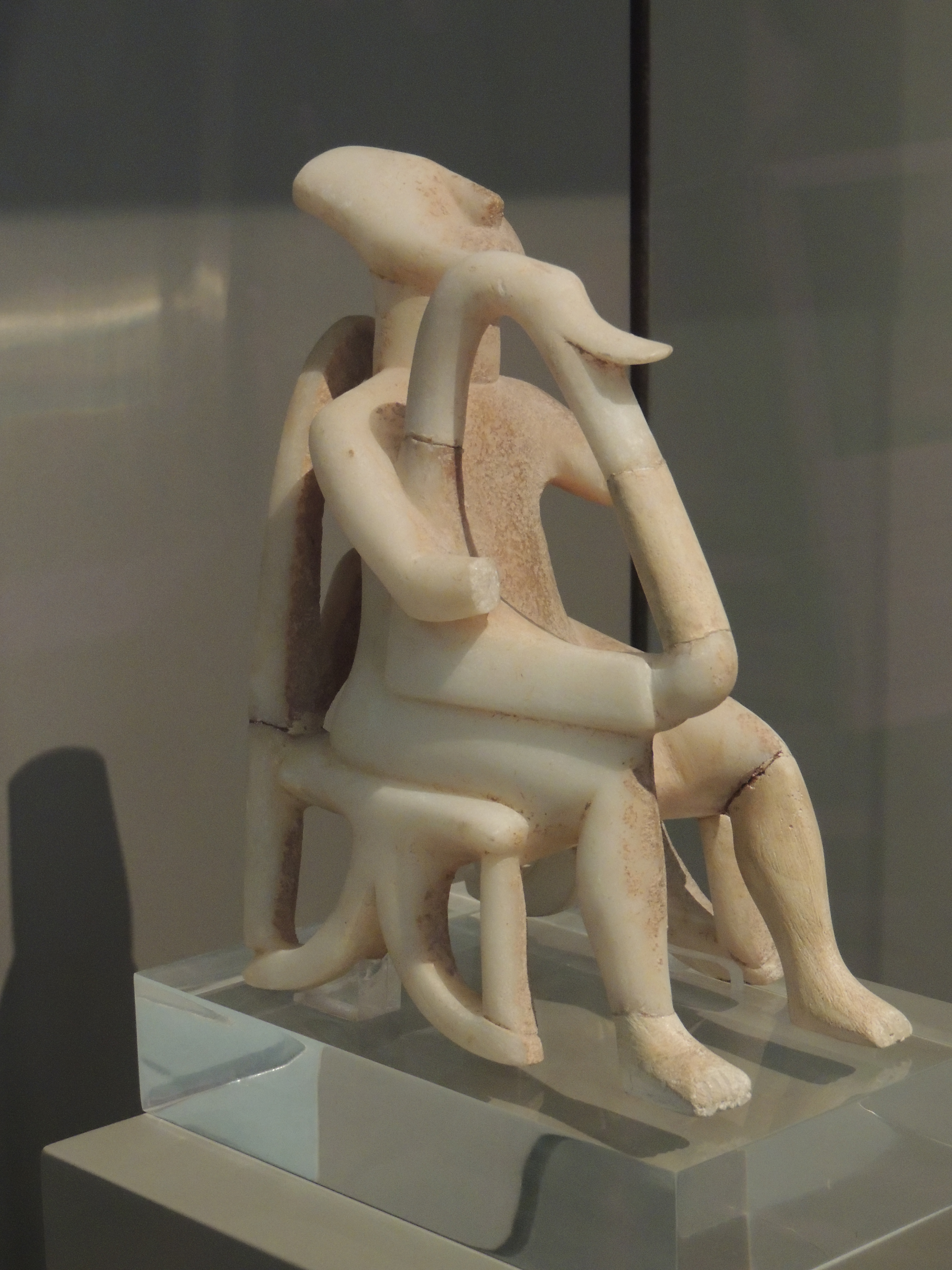
Male harp player from Keros

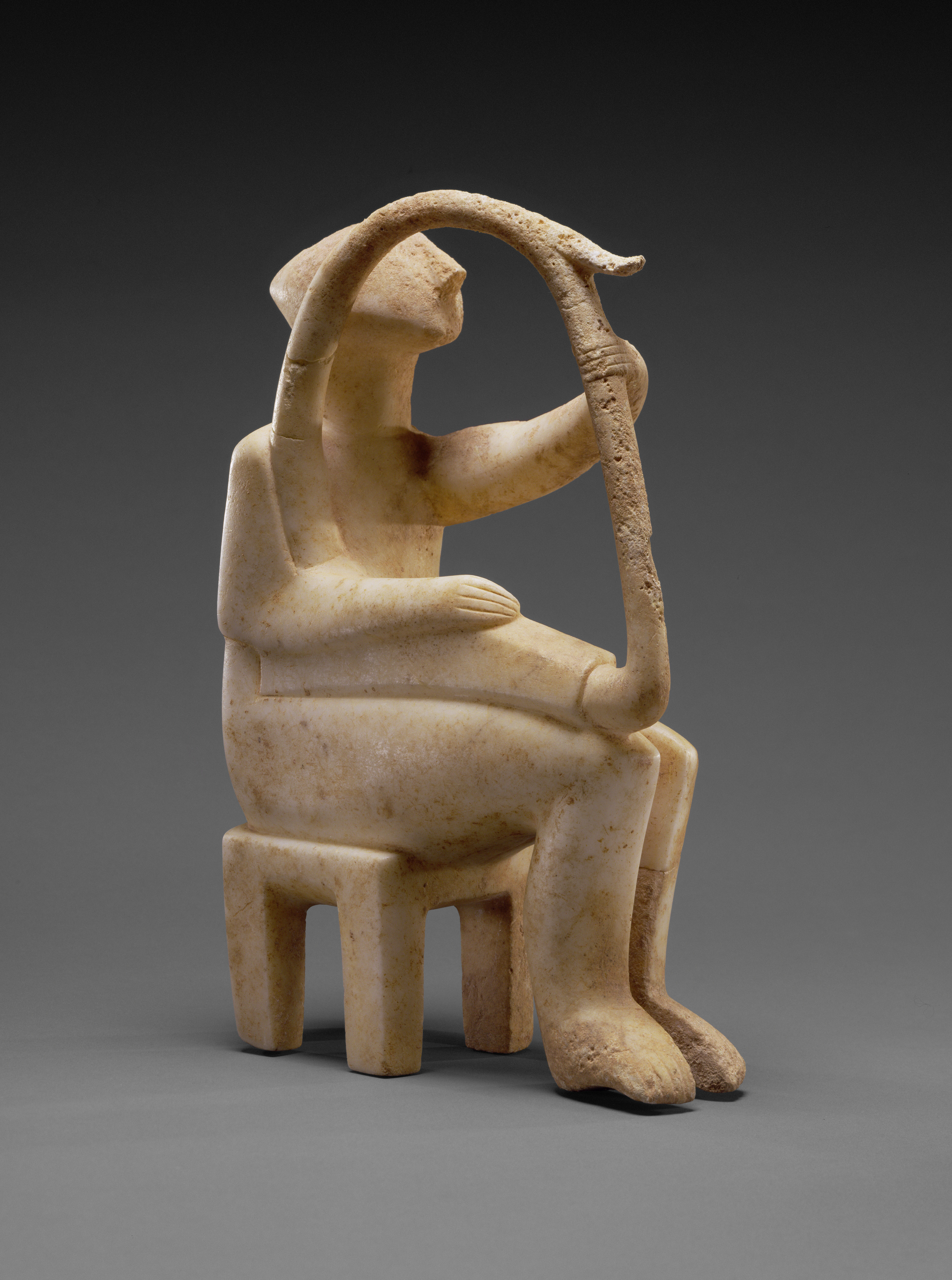
Male harp player of the early Spedos type in the Getty Villa

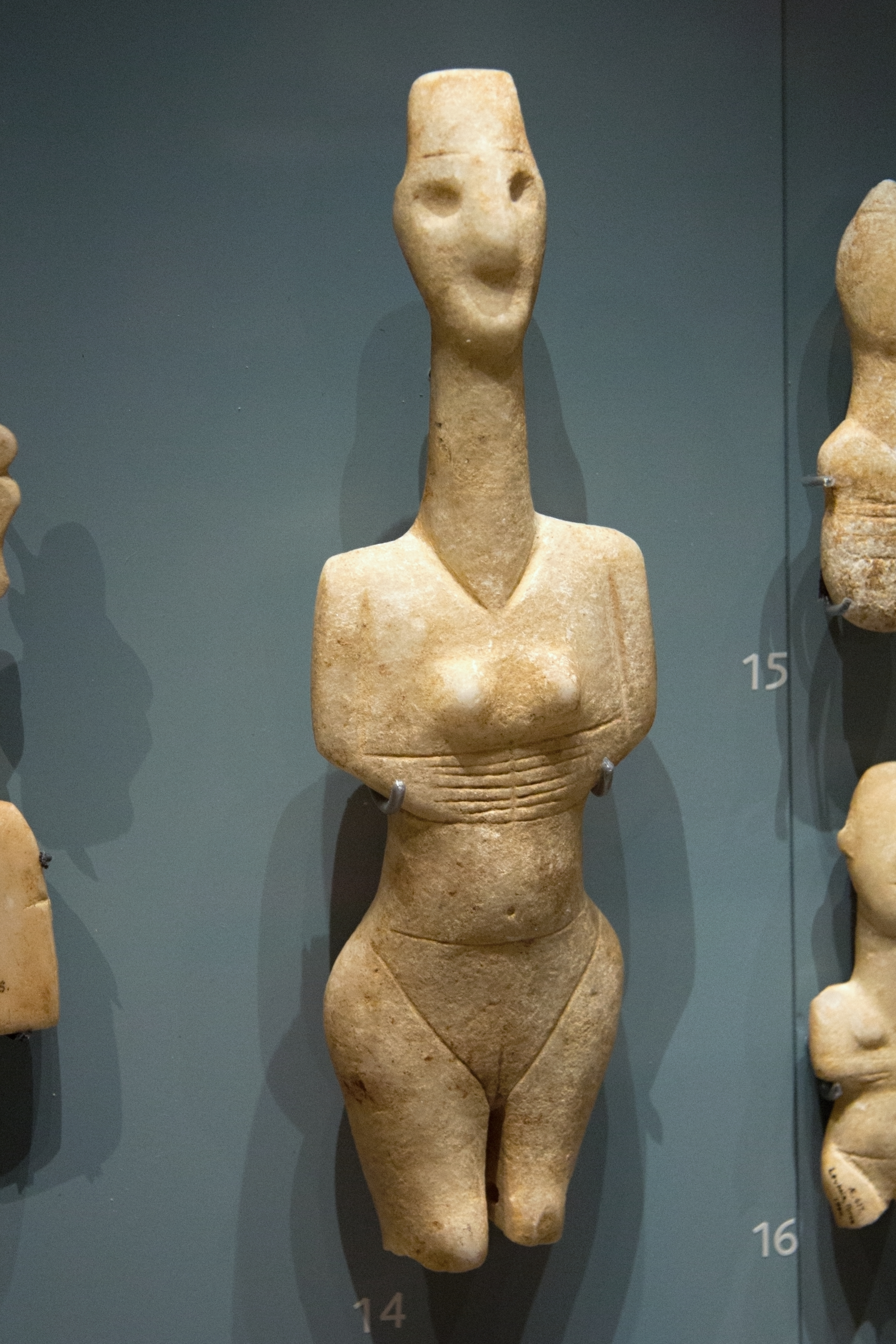
Female marble figurine from Naxos, Plastiras type (EC I, 3200–2800 BCE; Ashmolean Museum, Oxford)

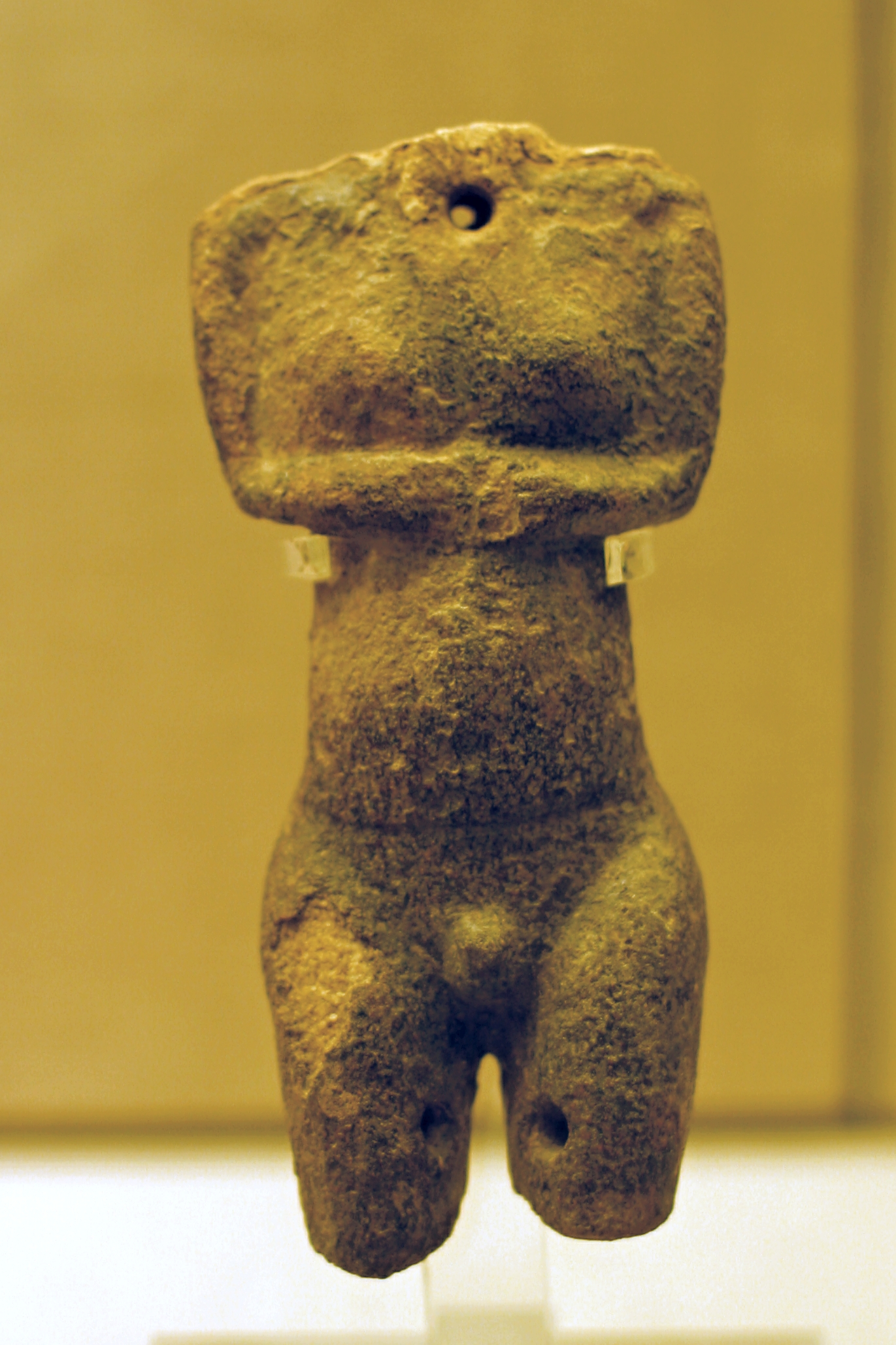
Female torso in darker stone with a hole in the throat and dírkama thighs, Plastiras type (EC I, 2800–2700 BCE; Museum of Prehistoric Thera)

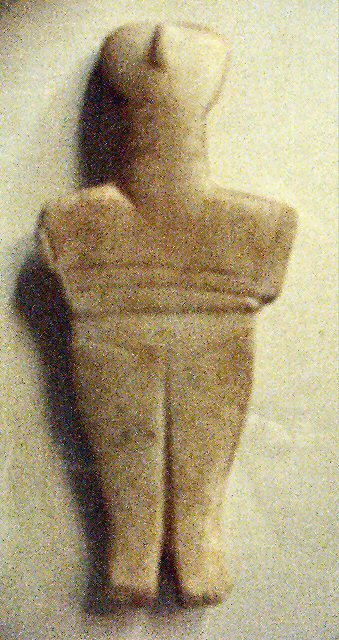
A cycladic sculpture (Heraklion Archaeological Museum)

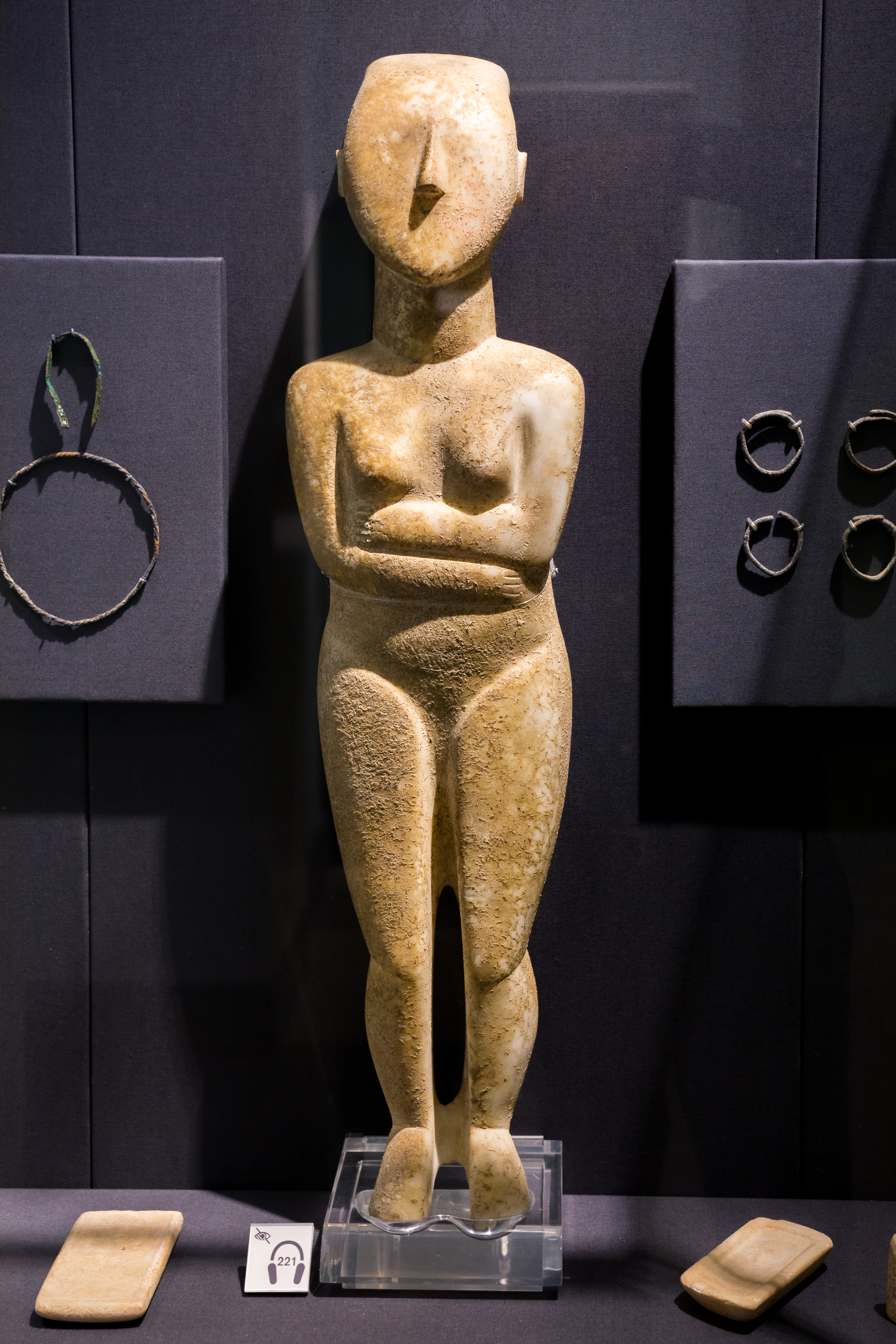
Large female figure of the early Spedos variety (76.8cm long), British Museum

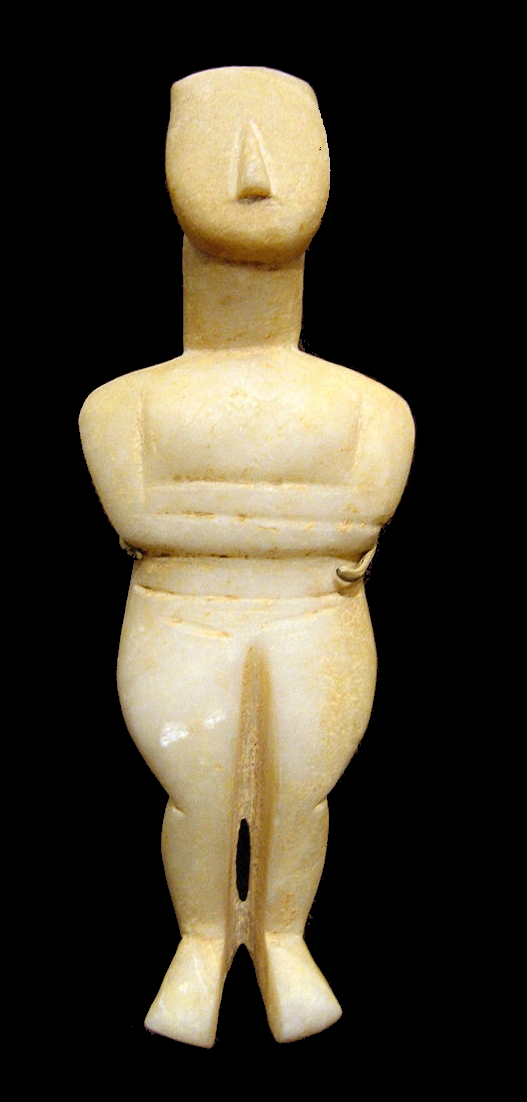
Female canonical type, early work of the Spedos variety (Goulandris Museum of Cycladic Art)

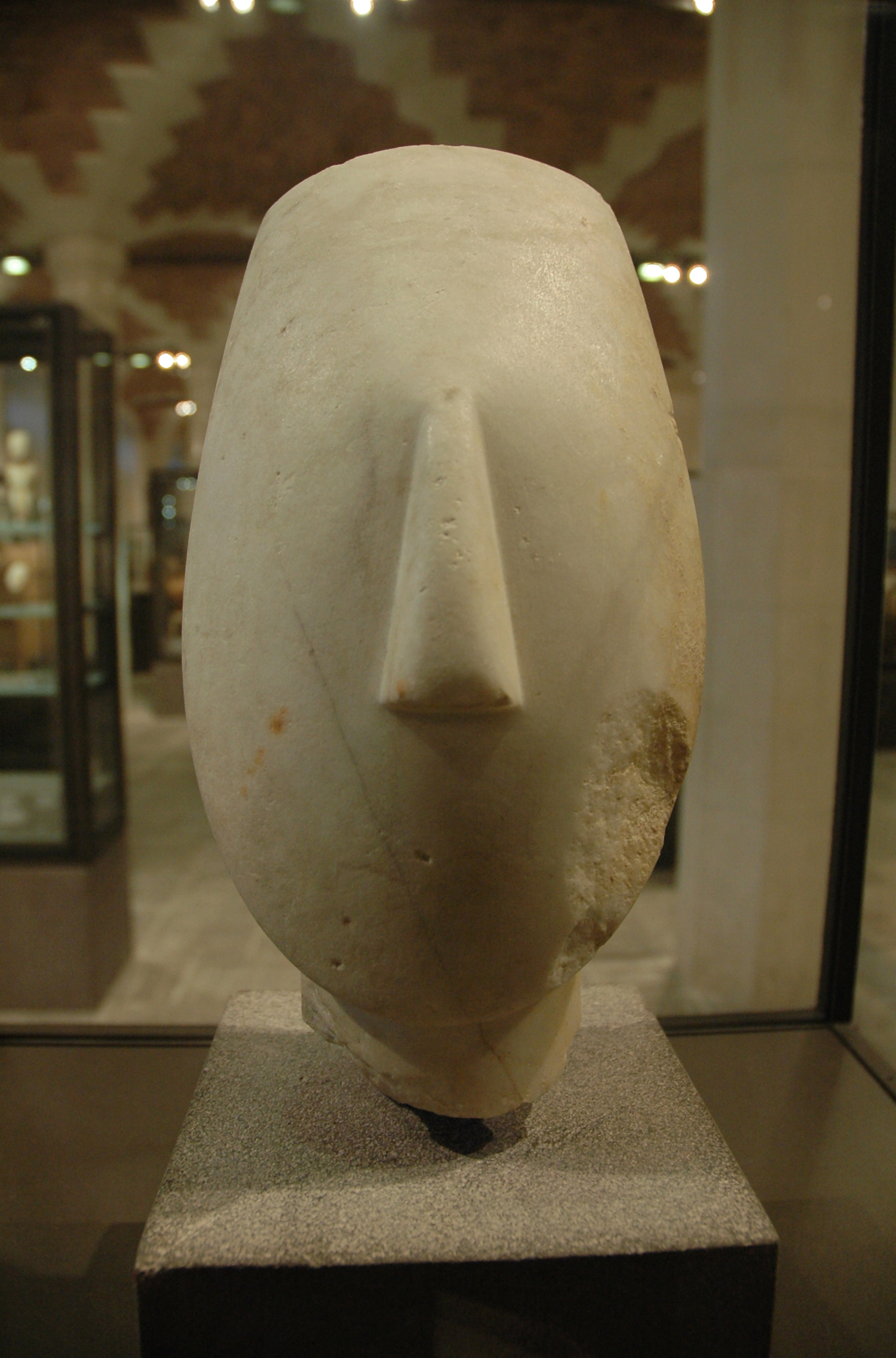
Head of a female figure, Spedos type, rr culture (EC II, 2700–2300 BCE; Louvre)

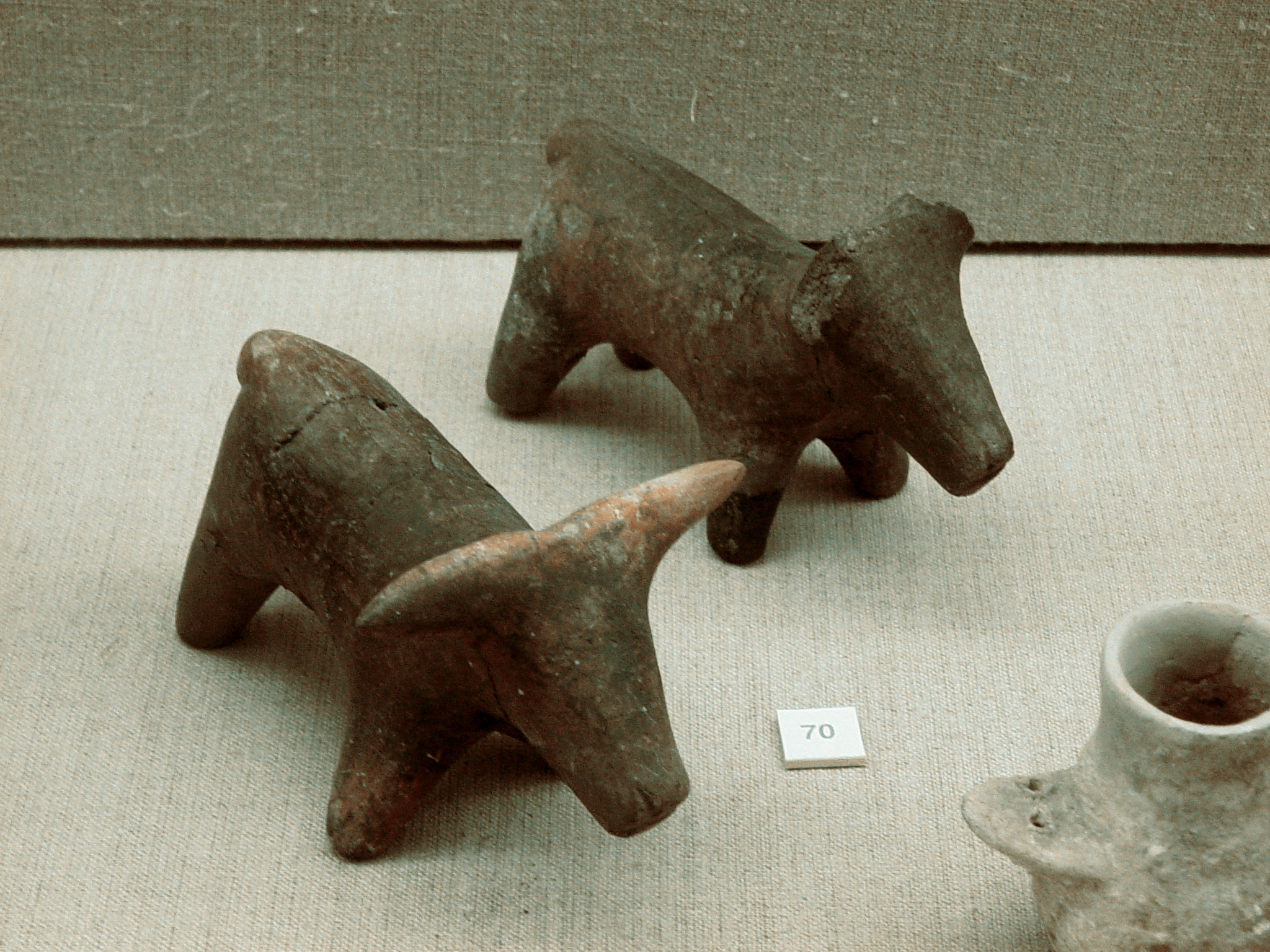
Early terracotta figurines from Santorini (c. 2100 BCE; Museum of Cycladic Culture)

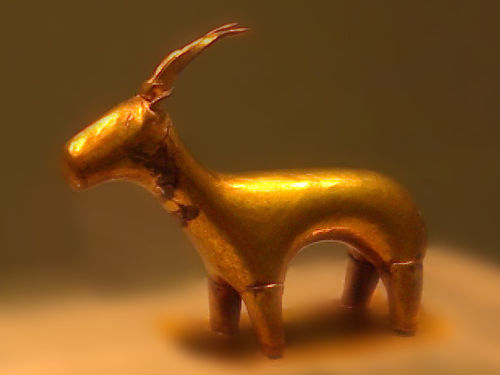
Gold figure of an ibex from Santorini, late Cycladic (17th century BCE)

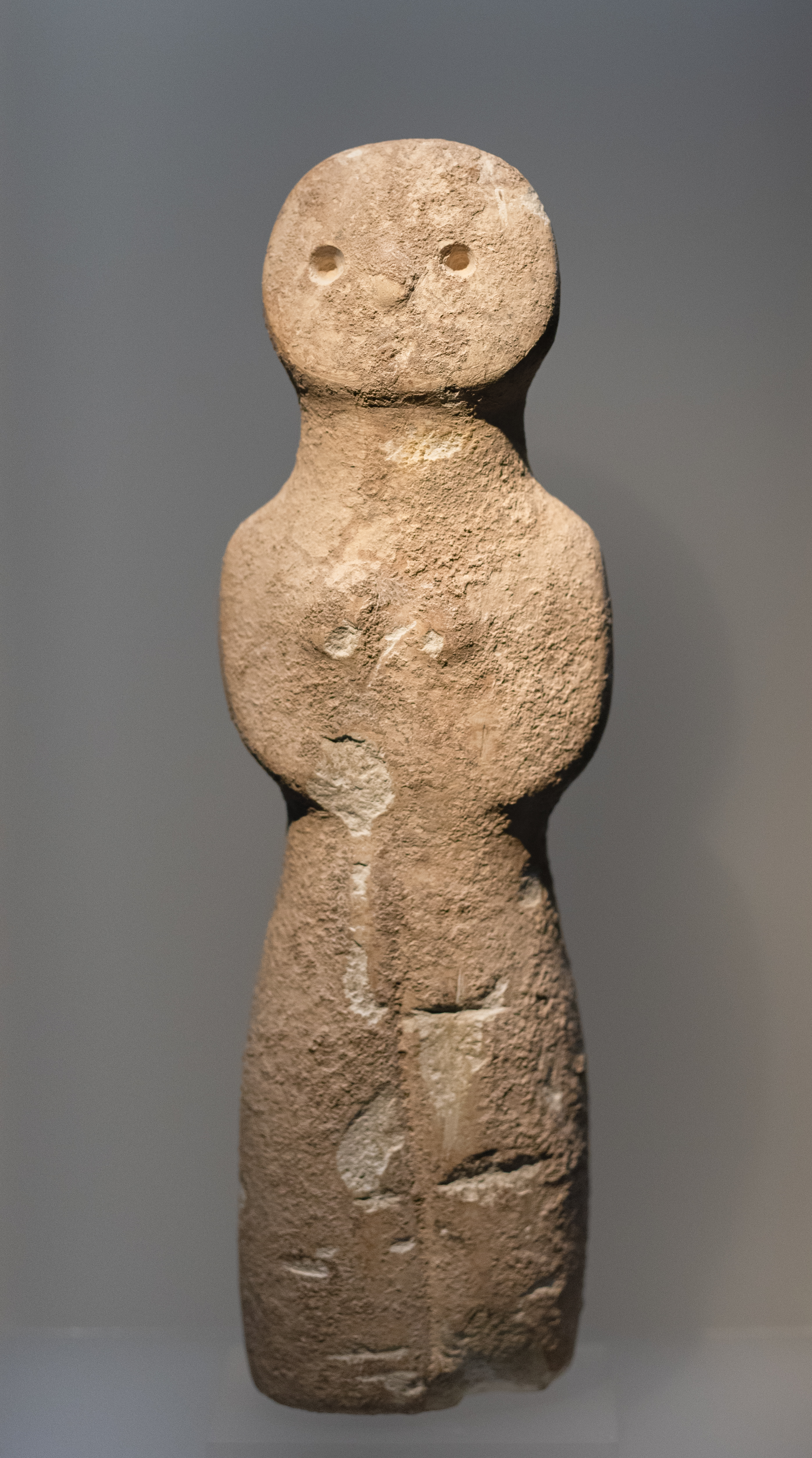
Zintilis Idol, Cyprus, 3900-2500 BC

== See also ==
- Akrotiri (prehistoric city) for additional artistic, decorative, and functional items excavated from an ancient Cycladic site.
- Keros-Syros culture
- Grotta–Pelos culture
