= List of destinations served by ferries from the port of Piraeus =

Most islands on the Aegean Sea can be reached by ferry from the port of Piraeus in Athens. The services in the list are subject to changes in routing as well as the ferries operated.

== Destinations by island group ==
=== Saronic Gulf ===
Destinations	Vessels	Ports of Call	Companies	Dates Operated
Aegina	Aero 1 Highspeed, Aero 2 Highspeed, Aero 3 Highspeed, Flying Dolphin Athina, Flying Dolphin Venus I, Flyingcat 5, Flyingcat 6, Nissos Aigina, Foivos, Achaeos, Apollon Hellas, Poseidon Hellas, Antigone	none	Hellenic Seaways, ANES, Saronic Ferries, Aegean Flying Dolphins	Year - Round
Aegina (Souvala)	Antigone	none	Saronic Ferries	Year - Round
Aegina (Agia Marina)	Aero 1 Highspeed, Aero 2 Highspeed, Aero 3 Highspeed, Magic I	none	Hellenic Seaways, Magic Sea Ferries	Seasonal
Agkistri	Aero 1 Highspeed, Aero 2 Highspeed, Aero 3 Highspeed, Flying Dolphin Athina, Flyingcat 5, Flyingcat 6, Achaeos, Apollon Hellas, Poseidon Hellas, Antigone	none or Aegina	Hellenic Seaways, Saronic Ferries, Aegean Flying Dolphins	Year - Round
Methana	Foivos, Achaeos, Apollon Hellas, Poseidon Hellas	Aegina	Saronic Ferries	Year - Round
Poros	Aero 1 Highspeed, Aero 2 Highspeed, Aero 3 Highspeed, Flyingcat 3, Flyingcat 4, Flyingcat 5, Flyingcat 6, Foivos, Apollon Hellas, Speed Cat I	none or Aegina and Methana	Hellenic Seaways, Saronic Ferries, Alpha Lines	Year - Round
Hydra	Aero 1 Highspeed, Aero 2 Highspeed, Aero 3 Highspeed, Flyingcat 3, Flyingcat 4, Flyingcat 5, Flyingcat 6, Speed Cat I, Magic I	none or Poros	Hellenic Seaways, Alpha Lines, Magic Sea Ferries	Year - Round
Ermioni	Aero 1 Highspeed, Aero 2 Highspeed, Aero 3 Highspeed, Flyingcat 4, Flyingcat 5, Flyingcat 6	Poros	Hellenic Seaways,	Year - Round
Spetses	Aero 1 Highspeed, Aero 2 Highspeed, Aero 3 Highspeed, Flyingcat 3, Flyingcat 4, Flyingcat 5, Flyingcat 6, Speed Cat I	Poros and Ermioni or Hydra	Hellenic Seaways, Alpha Lines	Year - Round
Porto Cheli	Aero 1 Highspeed, Aero 2 Highspeed, Aero 3 Highspeed, Flyingcat 3, Flyingcat 4, Flyingcat 5, Flyingcat 6	Poros, Spetses and Ermioni or Hydra	Hellenic Seaways	Year - Round

=== Crete, Kythera and Antikythera ===
Destinations	Vessels	Ports of Call	Companies	Dates Operated
Heraklion	Kriti II, Asterion II, Kissamos, Festos Palace, Knossos Palace, Blue Star Chios	none or Santorini and Anafi	ANEK Lines, Minoan Lines	Year - Round; services via Santorini and Anafi are limited
Chania	El. Venizelos (ship), Elyros, Superrunner Jet 2,Kydon Palace	none	ANEK Lines, Seajets	Year - Round
Sitia	Blue Star Chios	Santorini, Anafi, Heraklion	Blue Star Ferries	Year - Round; Limited Service
Kythera	Aqua Jewel	none	Sea Jets	Year - Round
Antikythera	Aqua Jewel	Kythera	Sea Jets	Year - Round
Kissamos	Aqua Jewel	Kythera, Antikythera	Sea Jets	Year - Round

=== Cyclades ===
Destinations	Vessels	Ports of Call	Companies	Dates Operated
Paros	Highspeed 4, Blue Star Delos, Blue Star Naxos, Blue Star 1, Champion Jet 3, Jumbo Jet, Thunder	none	Hellenic Seaways, Blue Star Ferries, Seajets, Fast Ferries	Year - Round
Naxos	Highspeed 4,, Blue Star Delos, Blue Star Naxos, Blue Star 1, Champion Jet 3, Jumbo Jet, Worldchampion Jet	Paros or Tinos and Mykonos	Hellenic Seaways, Blue Star Ferries, Seajets	Year - Round; services via Tinos operate only during the Summer
Sifnos	Champion Jet 2, Anemos, Dionysios Solomos, Superjet, Superjet 2	none or Kythnos and Serifos (High Speed Vessels always skip Kythnos)	Seajets, Zante Ferries, Aegean Speed Lines	Year - Round
Serifos	Champion Jet 2, Anemos, Dionysios Solomos, Superjet, Superjet 2	Sifnos, Kythnos, Serifos (High Speed Vessels always skip Kythnos)	Seajets, Zante Ferries, Aegean Speed Lines	Year - Round
Kythnos	Dionysios Solomos	none	Zante Ferries	Year - Round
Kimolos	Dionysios Solomos, Anemos	Kythnos, Serifos, Sifnos, Milos (Speedrunner 3 skips Milos)	Zante Ferries, Aegean Speed Lines	Year - Round
Milos	Champion Jet 2, Anemos, Dionysios Solomos, Superjet, Superjet 2, Speedrunner Jet, Superrunner Jet 2, Superjet, Superjet 2	none or Sifnos, Kythnos and Serifos (High Speed Vessels always skip Kythnos)	Seajets, Zante Ferries, Aegean Speed Lines,	Year - Round
Ios	Blue Star 1, Worldchampion Jet, Speedrunner Jet, Thunder, Dionysios Solomos, Jumbo Jet	Paros and Naxos or Kythnos, Serifos, Sifnos, Milos, Kimolos, Folegandros and Sikinos (High Speed Vessels as well as ferries operated by Blue Star Ferries do not call at Kythnos, Kimolos and Sikinos)	Seajets, Zante Ferries, Blue Star Ferries, Fast Ferries	Year - Round
Folegandros	Supejet, Superjet 2, Dionysios Solomos, Speedrunner Jet	Kythnos, Serifos, Sifnos, Milos	Zante Ferries, Sea Jets	Year - Round
Sikinos	Dionysios Solomos	Kythnos, Serifos, Sifnos, Milos, Folegandros (Speedrunner 3 skips Milos)	Zante Ferries	Year - Round
Santorini	Champion Jet 1, Champion Jet 3, Blue Star Delos, Blue Star Chios, Blue Star 1, Worldchampion Jet, Thunder, Dionysios Solomos, Speedrunner Jet	Paros, Naxos and Ios or Kythnos, Serifos, Sifnos, Milos, Kimolos, Folegandros, Sikinos and Ios (High Speed Vessels as well as ferries operated by Blue Star Ferries do not call at Kythnos, Kimolos and Sikinos and ANEK Lines Ferries only call at Milos, whereas many ferries skip Ios)	Seajets, Zante Ferries, Blue Star Ferries	Year - Round
Syros	Blue Star Paros, Blue Star Mykonos, Blue star 2, Blue Star 1, Worldchampion Jet, Champion Jet 1, Thunder, Jumbo Jet	none	Blue Star Ferries, Seajets, Fast Ferries	Year - Round
Tinos	Blue Star Paros, Jumbo Jet	Syros	Blue Star Ferries, Seajets	Year - Round
Mykonos	Worldchampion Jet, Blue Star Paros, Blue Star Mykonos, Blue Star Patmos, Jumbo Jet, Champion Jet 1. Thunder, jumbo Jet	none or Syros and Tinos (services calling at Tinos are limited)	Blue Star Ferries, Seajets, Fast Ferries	Year - Round
Koufonisi	Jumbo Jet, Highspeed 4, Blue Star Naxos	Syros, Paros, Naxos, Erakleia, Schoinoussa (Highspeed 4 skips Syros, Erakleia and Schoinoussa) or Serifos, Sifnos, Milos, Folegandros, Santorini, Amorgos (Katopola) (Seajet 2 route)	Blue Star Ferries, Seajets, Hellenic Seaways	Year - Round
Erakleia	Blue Star Naxos	Syros, Paros, Naxos	Blue Star Ferries	Year - Round
Schoinoussa	Blue Star Naxos	Syros, Paros, Naxos, Erakleia	Blue Star Ferries	Year - Round
Donousa	Blue Star Naxos	Paros, Naxos	Blue Star Ferries	Year - Round
Amorgos (Katopola)	Highspeed 4, Blue Star Naxos	Syros, Paros, Naxos, Erakleia, Schoinoussa, Koufonisi (Highspeed 4 skips Syros, Erakleia and Schoinoussa) or Serifos, Sifnos, Milos, Folegandros, Santorini (Seajet 2 route)	Blue Star Ferries, Hellenic Seaways	Year - Round
Amorgos (Aegiali)	Blue Star Naxos	Paros, Naxos, Donousa	Blue Star Ferries	Year - Round

=== Dodecanese ===
Destinations	Vessels	Ports of Call	Companies	Dates Operated
Astypalea	Blue Star Naxos, Blue Star Patmos	none or Paros, Naxos, Donousa, Amorgos (Aegiali)	Blue Star Ferries	Year - Round
Patmos	Blue Star 2, Blue Star Patmos	none or Syros (Blue Star 2 route)	Blue Star Ferries	Year - Round
Leipsoi	Blue Star Patmos	none or Patmos (Blue Star Patmos route)	Blue Star Ferries	Year - Round
Leros	Blue Star 2, Blue Star Patmos	Syros, Patmos, Leipsoi (Blue Star Patmos skips Syros, Blue Star 2 skips Leipsoi)	Blue Star Ferries	Year - Round
Kalymnos	Blue Star 2, Blue Star Patmos	Astypalea (Blue Star Patmos route) or Syros, Patmos, Leipsoi, Leros (Blue Star Patmos skips Syros, Blue Star 2 skips Astypalea and Leipsoi)	Blue Star Ferries	Year - Round
Kos	Blue Star 2, Blue Star Patmos	Syros, Patmos, Leipsoi, Leros, Kalymnos (Blue Star Patmos skips Syros, Blue Star 2 skips Leipsoi) or Astypalaia, Kalymnos (Blue Star Patmos route)	Blue Star Ferries	Year - Round
Nisyros	Blue Star Patmos	Astypalaia or Leipsoi, Kalymnos, Kos	Blue Star Ferries	Year - Round
Tilos	Blue Star Patmos	Astypalaia or Leipsoi, Kalymnos, Kos, Nisyros	Blue Star Ferries	Year - Round
Symi	Blue Star Patmos	Astypalaia or Leipsoi, Kalymnos, Kos, Nisyros, Tilos or Patmos, Leipsoi, Leros, Kalymnos, Kos route	Blue Star Ferries	Year - Round
Rhodes	Blue Star 2, Blue Star Patmos, Diagoras	Astypalea, Patmos, Leipsoi, Leros, Kalymnos, Kos, Nisyros, Tilos, Symi or Syros, Patmos, Leros, Kalymnos, Kos (Blue Star 2 route) or Santorini, Anafi, Heraklion, Sitia, Kasos, Karpathos, Karpathos (Diafani), Chalki (Diagoras route)	Blue Star Ferries	Year - Round
Kasos	Diagoras	Santorini, Anafi, or Santorini, Heraklion, Sitia	Blue Star Ferries	Year - Round
Karpathos	Diagoras	Santorini, Anafi, Kasos or Santorini, Heraklion, Sitia, Kasos	Blue Star Ferries	Year - Round
Karpathos (Diafani)	Diagoras	Santorini, Anafi, Kasos, Karpathos	Blue Star Ferries	Year - Round
Chalki	Diagoras	Santorini, Anafi, Kasos, Karpathos, Karpathos (Diafani)	Blue Star Ferries	Year - Round
Kastellorizo	Blue Star Patmos	Astypalaia or Leipsoi, Kalymnos, Kos, Nisyros, Symi, Rhodes	Blue Star Ferries	Year - Round

=== Central and North Aegean ===
Destinations	Vessels	Ports of Call	Companies	Dates Operated
Ikaria (Agios Kirykos)	Blue Star Myconos	Syros, Myconos	Blue Star Ferries	Year - Round
Ikaria (Evdilos)	Blue Star Myconos	Syros, Myconos	Blue Star Ferries	Year - Round
Fournoi	Blue Star Myconos	Syros, Myconos, Ikaria (Agios Kirykos or Evdilos)	Blue Star Ferries	Year - Round
Samos (Karlovasi)	Blue Star Myconos	Syros, Myconos, Ikaria (Agios Kirykos or Evdilos), Fournoi	Blue Star Ferries	Year - Round
Samos (Vathy)	Blue Star Myconos	Syros, Myconos, Ikaria (Agios Kirykos or Evdilos), Fournoi, Samos (Karlovasi)	Blue Star Ferries	Year - Round
Chios	Blue Star Myconos, Nissos Rodos, Nissos Samos	none or Syros, Myconos, Ikaria (Agios Kirykos or Evdilos), Fournoi, Samos (Karlovasi and Vathy) (Blue Star Myconos route) or Psara, Oinousses (Nissos Samos route)	Blue Star Ferries, Hellenic Seaways	Year - Round
Psara	Nissos Samos	none	Hellenic Seaways	Year - Round; Limited service
Oinousses	Nissos Samos	Psara	Hellenic Seaways	Year - Round; Limited service
Mytilene	Blue Star Myconos, Nissos Rodos, Nissos Samos	Chios or Syros, Myconos, Ikaria (Agios Kirykos or Evdilos), Fournoi, Samos (Karlovasi and Vathy), Chios (Blue Star Myconos route) or Psara, Oinousses, Chios (Nissos Samos route)	Blue Star Ferries, Hellenic Seaways	Year - Round
Lemnos	Blue Star Myconos	Syros, Myconos, Ikaria (Agios Kirykos or Evdilos), Fournoi, Samos (Karlovasi and Vathy), Chios, Mytilene	Blue Star Ferries	Year - Round
Kavala	Blue Star Myconos	Syros, Myconos, Ikaria (Agios Kirykos or Evdilos), Fournoi, Samos (Karlovasi and Vathy), Chios, Mytilene, Lemnos	Blue Star Ferries	Year - Round
Chios (Mesta)	Blue Star Patmos	Mykonos	Hellenic Seaways	Seasonal
Lesbos (Sigri)	Blue Star Patmos	Mykonos, Chios (Mesta)	Hellenic Seaways	Seasonal

== Destinations by company ==
This is a list of different island and mainland destinations operated in and out of the port of Piraeus, sorted by operating company

Company	Vessels	Destinations	Gate
Aegean Flying Dolphins	Athina, Erato, Venus I	Agkistri, Aigina, Methana, Poros	E9, E10
Aegean Sea Lines	Anemos	Kimolos, Kythnos, Milos, Serifos, Sifnos	E7
Aegina Ferries	Eleni	Aigina	E9, E10
Alpha Lines	Speedcat 1	Hydra, Poros, Spetses	E9, E10
ANEK Lines	Asterion II, El. Venizelos (ship), Elyros, Kissamos, Kriti II	Chania, Heraklion, Milos, Serifos	E3
Blue Star Ferries	Blue Star 1, Blue Star 2, Blue Star Delos, Blue Star Naxos, Blue Star Paros, Blue Star Patmos, Diagoras (ship)	Agios Kirykos, Aegiali, Anafi, Astypalea, Chios, Diafani, Donousa, Evdilos, Fournoi, Heraklion, Halki, Irakleia, Ios, Kalymnos, Karlovasi, Karpathos, Kasos, Kastellorizo, Katapola, Kavala, Kos, Koufonisia, Leipsoi, Lemnos, Leros, Mesta, Mykonos, Naxos, Nisyros, Paros, Patmos, Rhodes, Santorini, Schinoussa, Sitia, Symi, Syros, Thessaloniki, Tilos, Tinos, Vathy	E1, E2, E5, E7
Fast Ferries	Dionysios Solomos	Folegandros, Ios, Kimolos, Kythnos, Milos, Santorini, Serifos, Sifnos, Sikinos	E7
Hellenic Seaways	Aero 1, Aero 2, Aero 3, Flyingcat 3, Flyingcat 5, Highspeed 3, Nissos Rodos, Nissos Samos	Agkistri, Aigina, Chios, Ermioni, Hydra, Mytilene, Oinousses, Poros, Porto Cheli, Spetses	E2, E5, E7, E9, E10
Minoan Lines	Festos Palace, Knossos Palace,Kydon Palace	Heraklion, Milos	E3
Remezzo Maritime	Ag. Nektarios, Okyalos	Aigina	E9, E10
Saronic Ferries	Antigoni, Apollon Hellas, Acheos	Agkistri, Aigina, Methana, Poros	E9, E10
Seajets	Aqua Jewel, Champon Jet 2, Champion Jet 3, Eurochampion Jet, Naxos Jet, Olympic Champion Jet, Superrunner Jet	Amorgos, Antikythera, Folegandros, Heraklion, Ios, Kissamos, Kimolos, Koufonisia, Kythira, Kythnos, Milos, Mykonos, Naxos, Paros, Rethymno, Santorini, Serifos, Sifnos, Syros, Tinos	E5, E7
Superfast Ferries	Ariadne	Heraklion, Serifos	E3
