= Lesser Cyclades =

Island complex in the Aegean Sea

Small Cyclades
- Location within Greece

Geography
- Coordinates: 36.86°N 25.71°E
- Total islands: 32

Administration
- Greece
- Region: South Aegean
- Regional unit: Naxos

Demographics
- Population: 965 (2011)

The Lesser Cyclades or Small Cyclades (Greek: Μικρές Κυκλάδες) is an island complex in the Aegean Sea, inside the archipelago of the Cyclades. It is located to the south-east of Naxos and comprises 32 islands and rocks. The main islands are Ano Koufonisi, Kato Koufonisi, Irakleia, Schoinoussa, Donousa and Keros. The largest of them is Irakleia with an area of 18 km^{2} and the most populated is Ano Koufonisi with a population of 399, according to the 2011 census. Only four of them are inhabited, Ano Koufonisi, Irakleia, Donousa and Schoinoussa. The islet of Kato Antikeri has also two inhabitants. Administratively, the islands belong to the Naxos and Lesser Cyclades municipality apart from the islets of Ano and Kato Antikeri that belong to Amorgos municipality.

== History ==
During the last ice age most of the islands of the Cyclades were united into a big landmass. After the sea level rose in ca. 9,000 B.C. the Aegean flooded the landmass to form the many small islands: this is when the archipelago acquired its modern form.

The Lesser Cyclades have been inhabited since the Stone Age. The islands flourished during the early Bronze Age, when the Cycladic culture appeared. The island of Keros was one of the major sites of Cycladic culture and has given its name to Early Cycladic II period of Cycladic culture, known as Keros-Syros culture. The islands continued to be populated thereafter. On the islands, particularly on Schoinoussa and Irakleia, ruins from classical antiquity and the Roman period can be found. The islands suffered from piracy both in medieval and modern times, which led the islands to be at turn depopulated and colonised again by shepherds from Amorgos. Since the 11th century most of the islands of the Lesser Cyclades were given as property to the Hozoviotissa Monastery in Amorgos. The monastery even today retains large areas in the islands as its property. The islands today have been developed as a popular tourist destination.

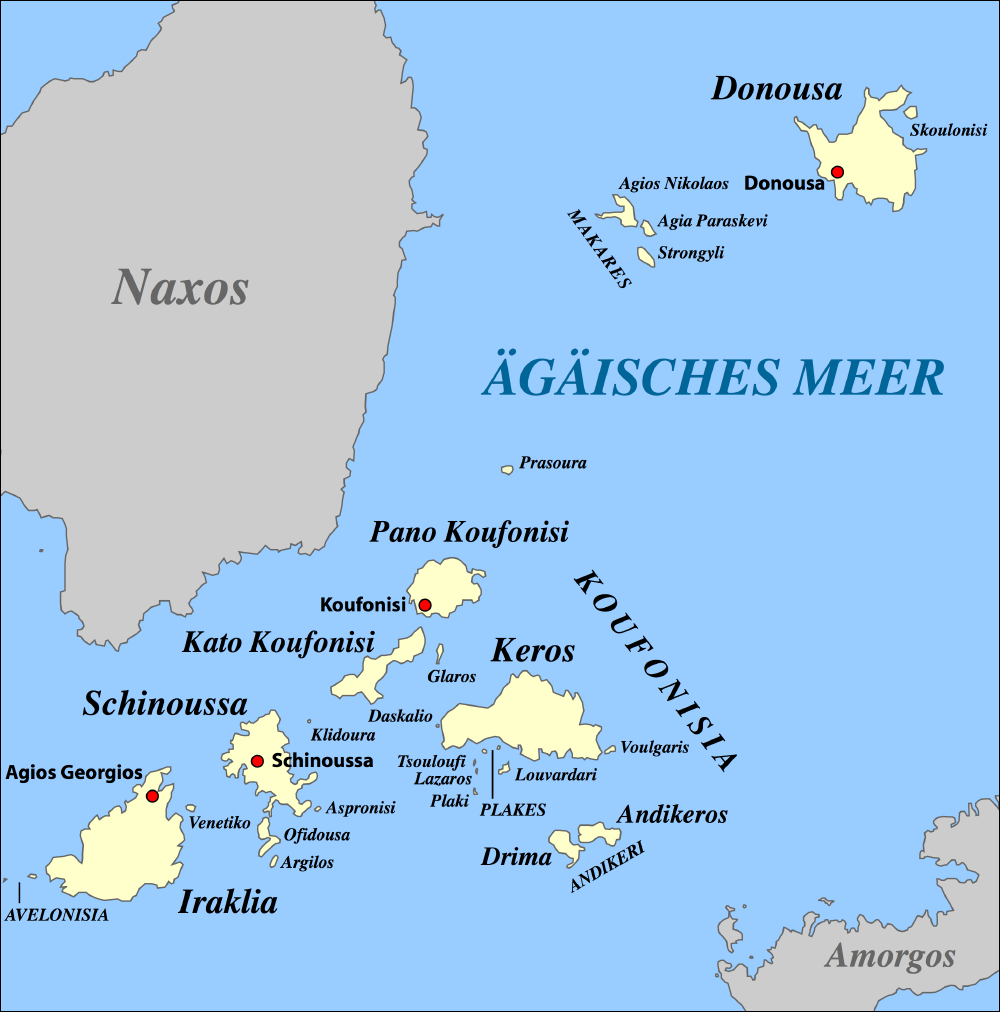
Map of the Lesser Cyclades

== Main islands ==
Island	Area (Km^{2})	Population (2011)
Irakleia	18.1	141
Keros	15.0	0
Donousa	13.7	167
Schoinoussa	8.1	256
Ano Koufonisi	5.8	399
Kato Koufonisi	3.9	0
Ano Antikeri	1.1	0
Kato Antikeri	1.1	2
