= Drymalia =

Drymalia Δρυμαλία
- Municipal unit
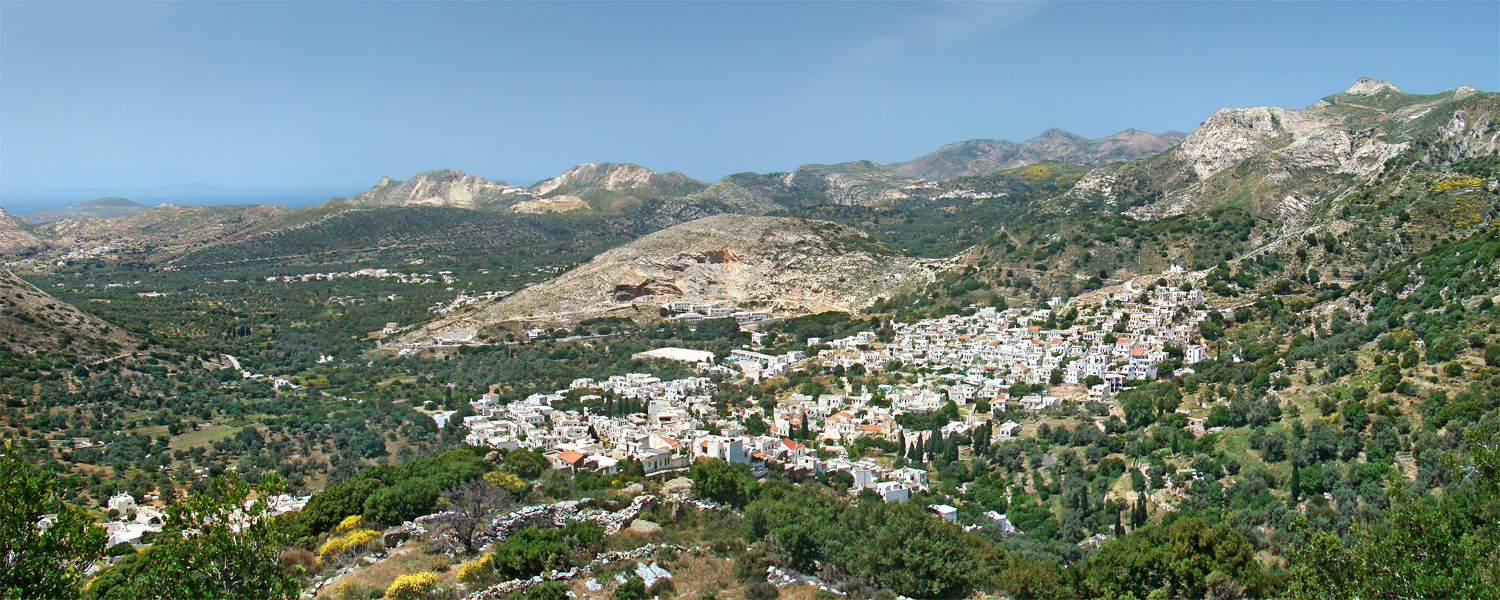
- Panoramic view of Filoti

- Location within the regional unit

- Location within Greece
- Coordinates: 37°04′N 25°29′E
- Country: Greece
- Administrative region: South Aegean
- Regional unit: Naxos
- Municipality: Naxos and Lesser Cyclades

Area
  - Municipal unit: 302.8 km^{2} (116.9 sq mi)

Population (2021)
  - Municipal unit: 4,889
  - Municipal unit density: 16.15/km^{2} (41.82/sq mi)
- Time zone: UTC+2 (EET)
  - Summer (DST): UTC+3 (EEST)
- Vehicle registration: EM

Drymalia (Greek: Δρυμαλία) is a former municipality on the island of Naxos, in the Cyclades, Greece. Since the 2011 local government reform it is part of the municipality Naxos and Lesser Cyclades, of which it is a municipal unit. With a land area of 302.828 km^{2} (116.923 sq mi), it comprises about 70 percent of the island, in the eastern, northern, and southern parts. Its population was 4,889 at the 2021 census. The seat of the municipality was in Chalkeio, located at the center of the island. The largest town is Filoti, other large towns are Aperathos, Koronos, Damarionas, and Koronis. The municipal unit shares the island with the municipal unit of Naxos (city), which comprises about 30 percent of the island of Naxos, at its western end.
