= Naxos and Lesser Cyclades =

Naxos and Lesser Cyclades Νάξος και Μικρές Κυκλάδες
- Municipality
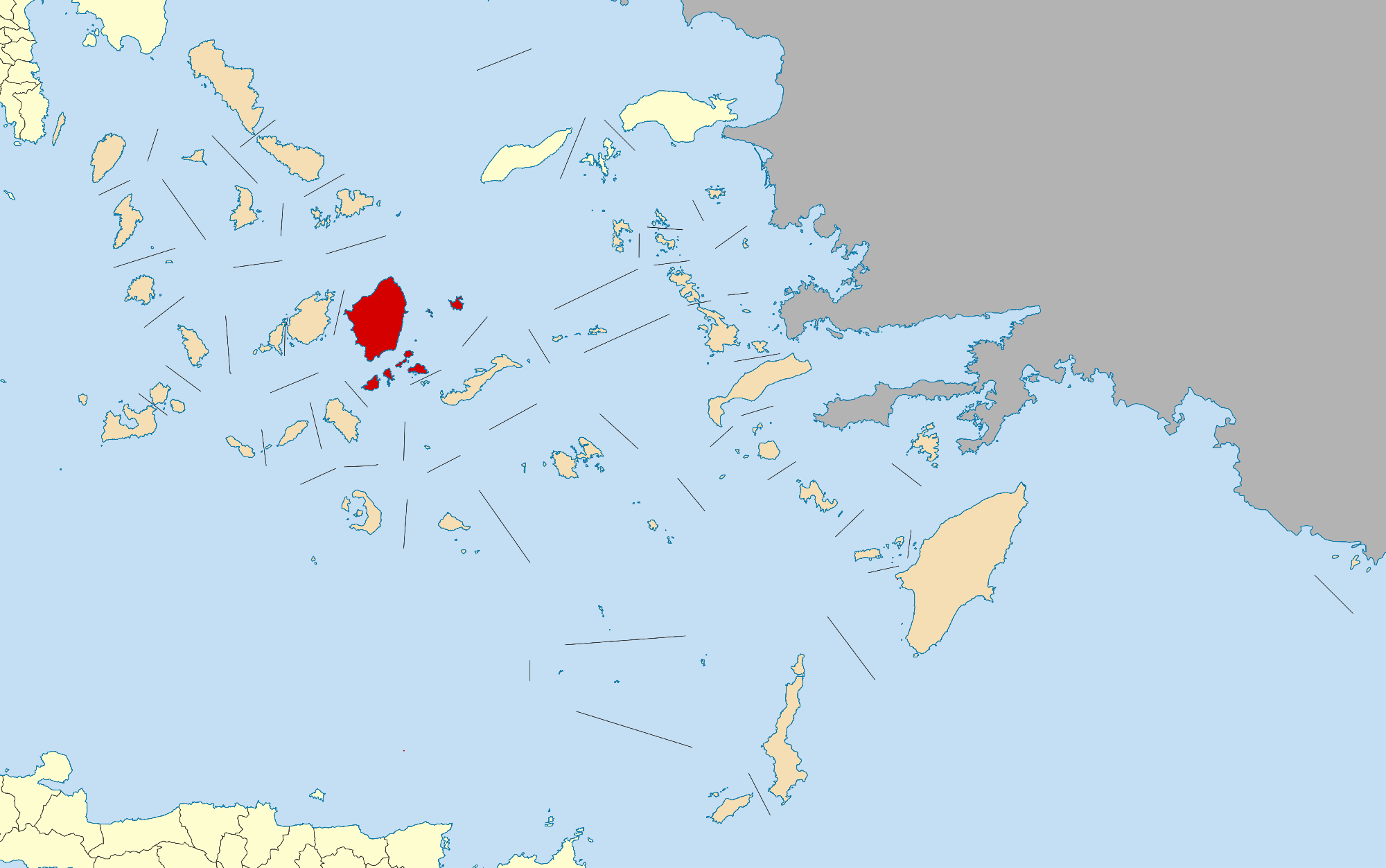

- Location within Greece
- Coordinates: 37°6′N 25°22′E
- Country: Greece
- Administrative region: South Aegean
- Regional unit: Naxos
- Seat: Naxos

Area
  - Municipality: 495.9 km^{2} (191.5 sq mi)

Population (2021)
  - Municipality: 20,578
  - Density: 41.50/km^{2} (107.5/sq mi)
- Time zone: UTC+2 (EET)
  - Summer (DST): UTC+3 (EEST)

Naxos and Lesser Cyclades (Greek: Νάξος και Μικρές Κυκλάδες) is a municipality in the Naxos regional unit, South Aegean region, Greece. The seat of the municipality is the town Naxos (city). The municipality consists of the Cycladic island of Naxos and the islands of the Lesser Cyclades: Donousa, Irakleia, Koufonisia, Schoinoussa and several smaller islands. The municipality has an area of 495.867 km^{2}.

== Municipality ==
The municipality Naxos and Lesser Cyclades was formed at the 2011 local government reform by the merger of the following 6 former municipalities, that became municipal units:

- Donousa
- Drymalia
- Irakleia
- Koufonisia
- Naxos (city)
- Schoinoussa
