= Schoinoussa =

Greek island in the Aegean Sea

Schoinoussa Σχοινούσσα
- Municipal unit
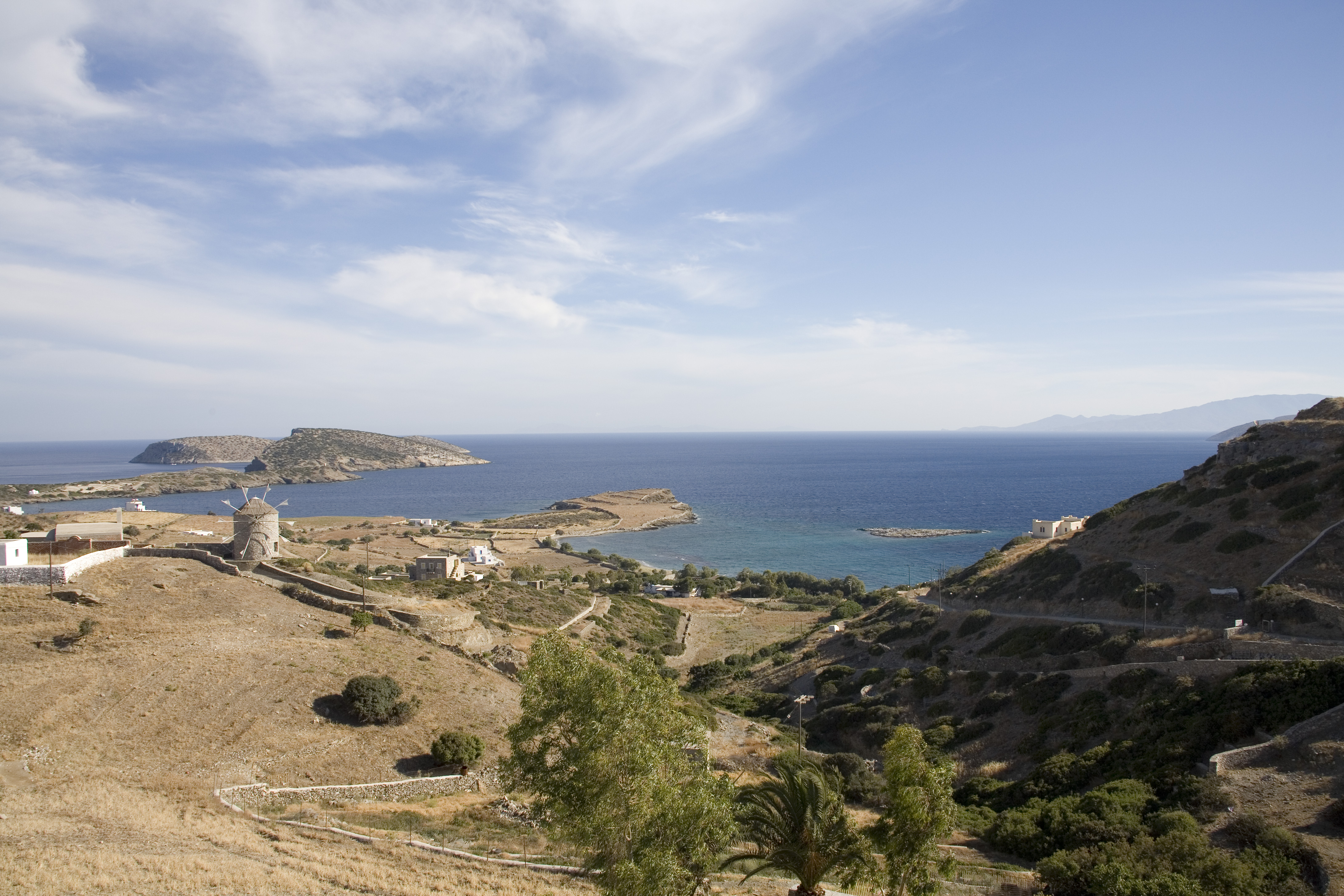

- Location within the regional unit

- Location within Greece
- Coordinates: 36°52′N 25°31′E
- Country: Greece
- Administrative region: South Aegean
- Regional unit: Naxos
- Municipality: Naxos and Lesser Cyclades

Area
  - Municipal unit: 8.512 km^{2} (3.287 sq mi)

Population (2021)
  - Municipal unit: 229
  - Municipal unit density: 26.9/km^{2} (69.7/sq mi)
- Time zone: UTC+2 (EET)
  - Summer (DST): UTC+3 (EEST)
- Postal code: 843 00
- Area code: 22870
- Vehicle registration: EM

Schoinoussa or Schinoussa (Greek: Σχοινούσσα pronounced [sçiˈnusa]; anciently Σχινοῦσσα) is an island and a former community in the Cyclades, Greece. Since the 2011 local government reform it is part of the municipality Naxos and Lesser Cyclades, of which it is a municipal unit. It lies south of the island of Naxos, in the Lesser Cyclades group, between the island communities of Irakleia and Koufonisia. The population was 229 inhabitants at the 2021 census. Its land area is 8.512 square kilometres (3.29 sq mi).

== Description ==
Schoinoussa is located south of Naxos, in the middle of the Lesser Cyclades island group. It is the fourth largest island of the Lesser Cyclades and the second most populated, after Ano Koufonisi. The island has three settlements, Chora the capital of the island, Mesaria and Mersini which is the port of the island. The derivation of the name Schinoussa is not precisely known. It is believed that the name either derives from the corruption of the ancient name Echinousa or from a Venetian nobleman named Schinoza. Schoinoussa has been inhabited since antiquity. On the island there are sites of archaeological interest including ancient Greek and Roman ruins, ruins of a Byzantine church and a small medieval castle. From the 11th century, the island was the property of the Hozoviotissa Monastery on the nearby island of Amorgos.

=== Historical population ===
Year	Population
2001	206
2011	256
2021	229

== Climate ==
According to the National Observatory of Athens, Schoinoussa has a hot semi-arid climate (Köppen climate classification: BSh). Schoinoussa records the second lowest average annual precipitation in Greece with around 240 mm, missing the hot desert climate (Köppen climate classification: BWh) by less than 50 mm. The area has very mild winters and hot summers.

Climate data for Schoinoussa 72 m a.s.l.
Month	Jan	Feb	Mar	Apr	May	Jun	Jul	Aug	Sep	Oct	Nov	Dec	Year
Record high °C (°F)	19.8 (67.6)	20.6 (69.1)	23.4 (74.1)	25.5 (77.9)	32.9 (91.2)	36.3 (97.3)	37.8 (100.0)	37.8 (100.0)	33.2 (91.8)	31.2 (88.2)	26.3 (79.3)	20.9 (69.6)	37.8 (100.0)
Mean daily maximum °C (°F)	14.3 (57.7)	15.0 (59.0)	16.2 (61.2)	19.4 (66.9)	23.1 (73.6)	27.9 (82.2)	30.4 (86.7)	30.5 (86.9)	27.2 (81.0)	22.7 (72.9)	19.3 (66.7)	15.7 (60.3)	21.8 (71.3)
Daily mean °C (°F)	12.4 (54.3)	13.1 (55.6)	14.0 (57.2)	16.8 (62.2)	20.2 (68.4)	24.7 (76.5)	27.0 (80.6)	27.2 (81.0)	24.6 (76.3)	20.4 (68.7)	17.3 (63.1)	13.9 (57.0)	19.3 (66.7)
Mean daily minimum °C (°F)	10.5 (50.9)	11.2 (52.2)	11.8 (53.2)	14.2 (57.6)	17.4 (63.3)	21.4 (70.5)	23.7 (74.7)	24.0 (75.2)	21.9 (71.4)	18.2 (64.8)	15.3 (59.5)	12.1 (53.8)	16.8 (62.3)
Record low °C (°F)	0.7 (33.3)	0.5 (32.9)	2.3 (36.1)	7.9 (46.2)	13.1 (55.6)	16.3 (61.3)	20.7 (69.3)	20.4 (68.7)	14.7 (58.5)	12.3 (54.1)	9.2 (48.6)	0.4 (32.7)	0.4 (32.7)
Average rainfall mm (inches)	47.4 (1.87)	32.3 (1.27)	39.5 (1.56)	5.0 (0.20)	7.5 (0.30)	3.7 (0.15)	0.2 (0.01)	0.1 (0.00)	4.0 (0.16)	11.9 (0.47)	32.5 (1.28)	55.2 (2.17)	239.3 (9.44)
Source: National Observatory of Athens Monthly Bulletins (Jul 2013-Nov 2024) and World Meteorological Organization

== Gallery ==
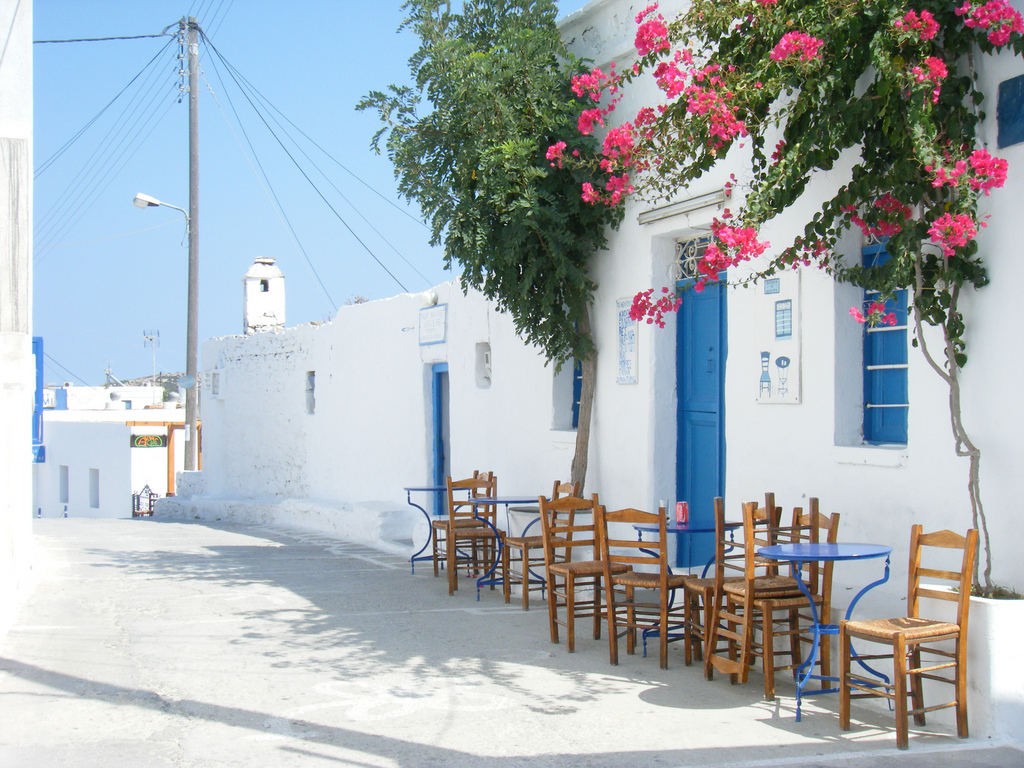
Chora village on Schoinoussa

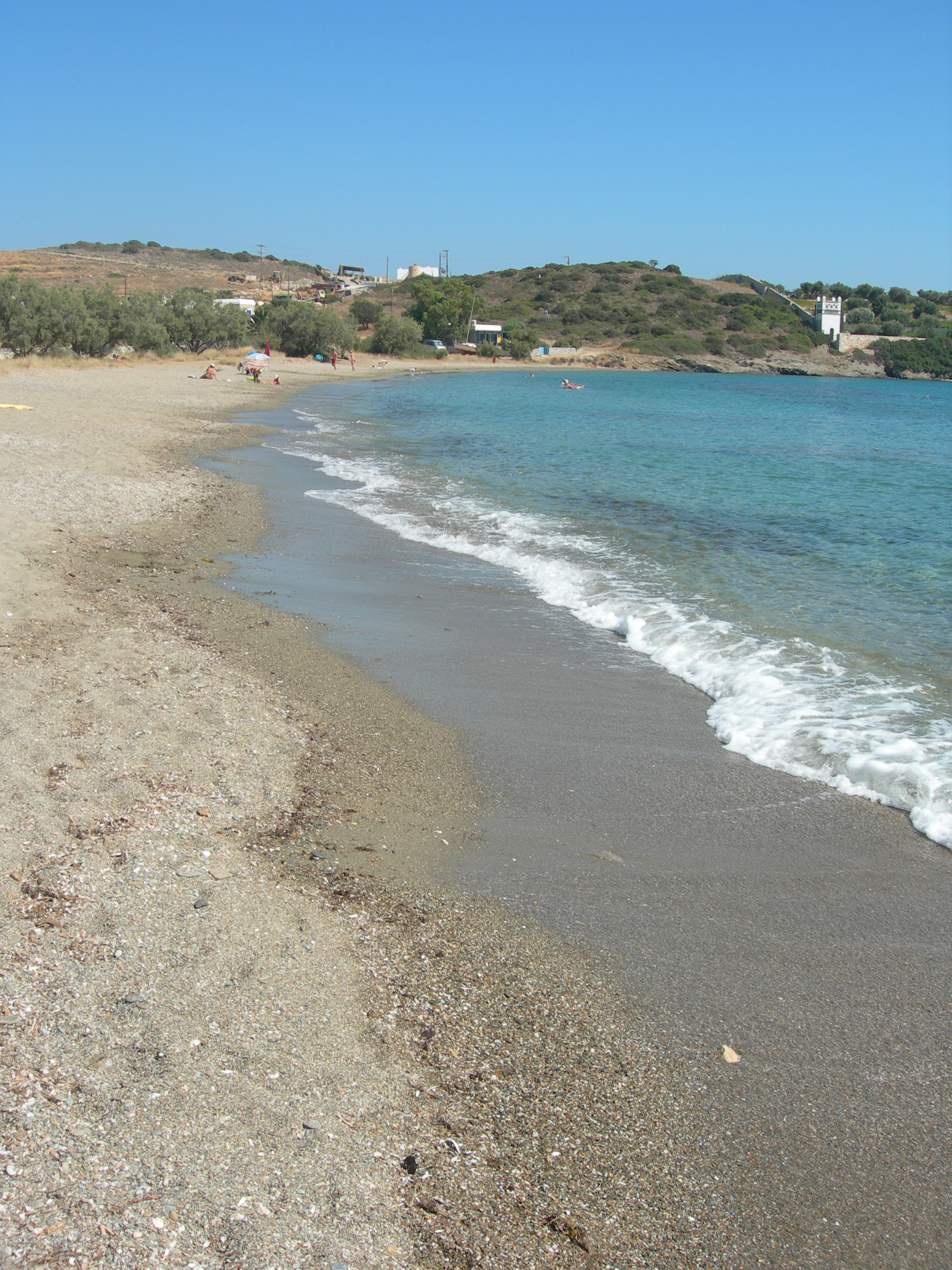
The beach of Livadi

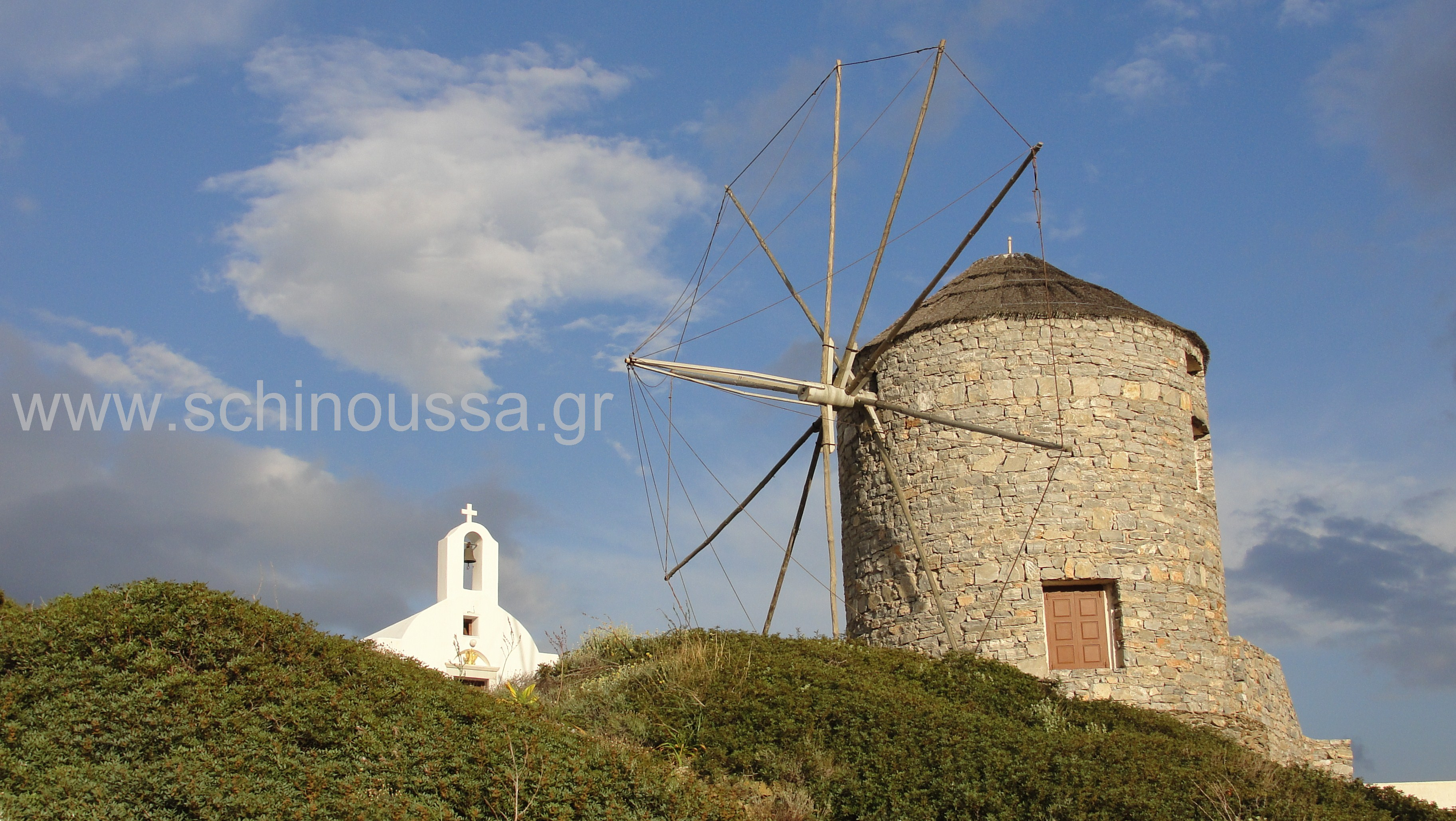
Traditional windmill-church in Schoinoussa

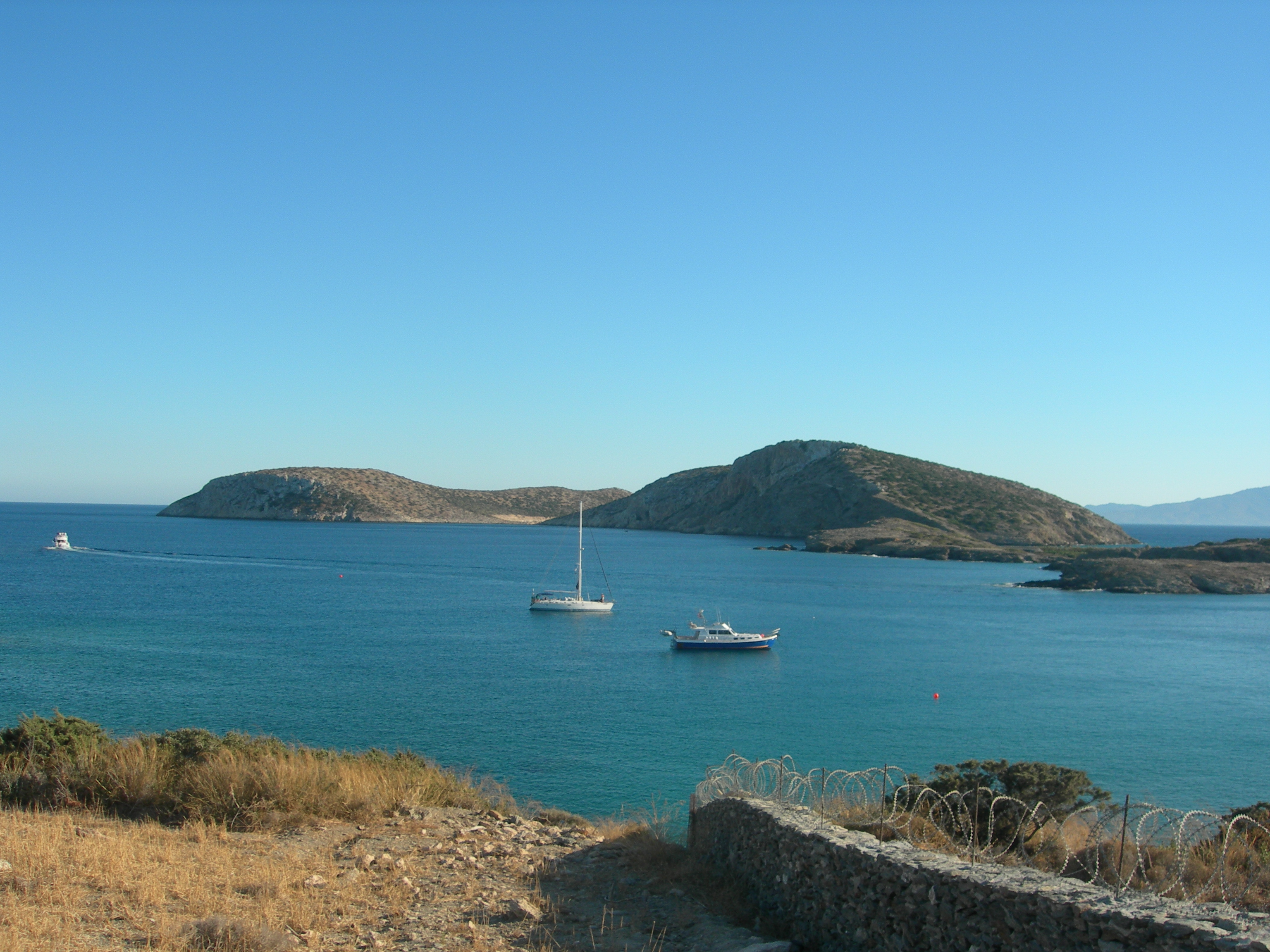
Schoinoussa and neighbouring islands
