= Zante Ferries =

Greek Ferry company

Zante Ferries / ANMEZ S.A.
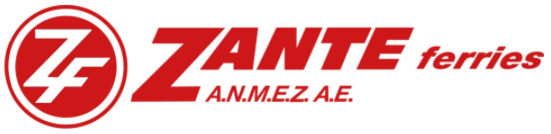
- Founded: 1991
- Defunct: 2024
- Headquarters: Zakynthos, Greece
- Area served: Aegean Sea
- Services: Passenger transportation Freight transportation
- Website: zanteferries.gr

Zante Ferries, also known as ANMEZ (Ανώνυμη Ναυτιλιακή Μεταφορική Εταιρεία Ζακύνθου) in Greek, was a Greek ferry company operating from the Greek mainland to the West Cyclades, Samothrace and Lemnos from the ports of Piraeus and Alexandroupolis. The company was founded on 25 January 1991, and ceased operations in 2024 after Fast Ferries acquired the last two ferries, Dionisios Solomos and Adamantios Korais.

== Former fleet ==
- Agios Dionisios (1991-1995), Decommissioned in Perama in 1996.
- Agios Dionisios S (1995-2002), Sunk north of Lanzarote, when it was towed from Las Palmas to Aliaga for scrapping in 2014.
- Andreas Kalvos (2002-2018), now serving as Andreas Kalvos for Levante Ferries since 2018.
- Odysseas Elytis (2008-2013), now serving as Elysia for Munic Line since 2013.
- Dionisios Solomos (1999-2024), now operating for Fast Ferries since 2024.
- Adamantios Korais (2007-2024), now operating for Fast Ferries since 2024.
