= Irakleia (Cyclades) =

Greek island in the Aegean Sea

Irakleia Ηρακλειά
- Municipal unit
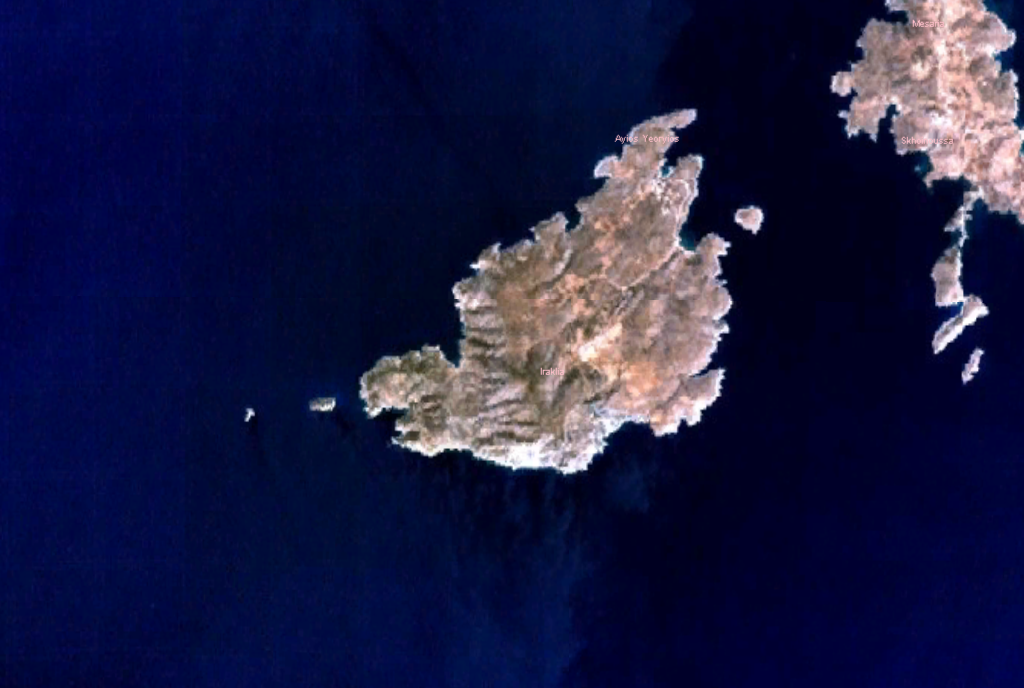
- Satellite image of Irakleia. Island at the edge of the image on the right (east) is Schoinoussa, islets on the left (west) are Avelonisia

- Location within the regional unit

- Location within Greece
- Coordinates: 36°50′N 25°27′E
- Country: Greece
- Administrative region: South Aegean
- Regional unit: Naxos
- Municipality: Naxos and Lesser Cyclades

Area
  - Municipal unit: 17.795 km^{2} (6.871 sq mi)

Population (2021)
  - Municipal unit: 148
  - Municipal unit density: 8.32/km^{2} (21.5/sq mi)
- Time zone: UTC+2 (EET)
  - Summer (DST): UTC+3 (EEST)
- Postal code: 843 00
- Area code: 22870
- Vehicle registration: EM
- Website: www.iraklia.gr

Irakleia or Heraklia (Greek: Ηρακλειά; Ancient Greek: Ἡράκλεια) is an island and a former community in the Cyclades, Greece. Since the 2011 local government reform it is part of the municipality Naxos and Lesser Cyclades, of which it is a municipal unit. Its population was officially 148 inhabitants at the 2021 census, and its land area 17.795 square kilometres (6.9 mi^{2}). It is a small island between the islands of Naxos and Ios. Close to Schoinoussa, Koufonisi, Donoussa, and Keros, together they form the Lesser Cyclades. The port is called Agios Georgios, while the "capital"/chora on the top of the island is called Panagia (Madonna). The biggest caves in the Cyclades are located on Irakleia. Irakleia can be reached by ferries from Athens, Naxos and Paros.

== Description ==
Iraklia is the largest island of the Lesser Cyclades. It is located in the eastern part of the archipelago, which is south of Naxos. The island has two settlements, Panagia in the middle of the island and Agios Georgios, where the port is located. Irakleia has been inhabited from early antiquity. On the island there are many mysterious rock paintings which are from approximately 5,000 years ago. The paintings, named Bousoules (Μπούσουλες), may have been used as orientation marks. The ruins of a fortress dating from the 4th-2nd century B.C. are located at Livadi on the island. In modern times, Iraklia was the property of the Hozoviotissa Monastery on the nearby island of Amorgos.

=== Historical population ===
Year	Population
2001	151
2011	141
2021	148

== Ancient history ==
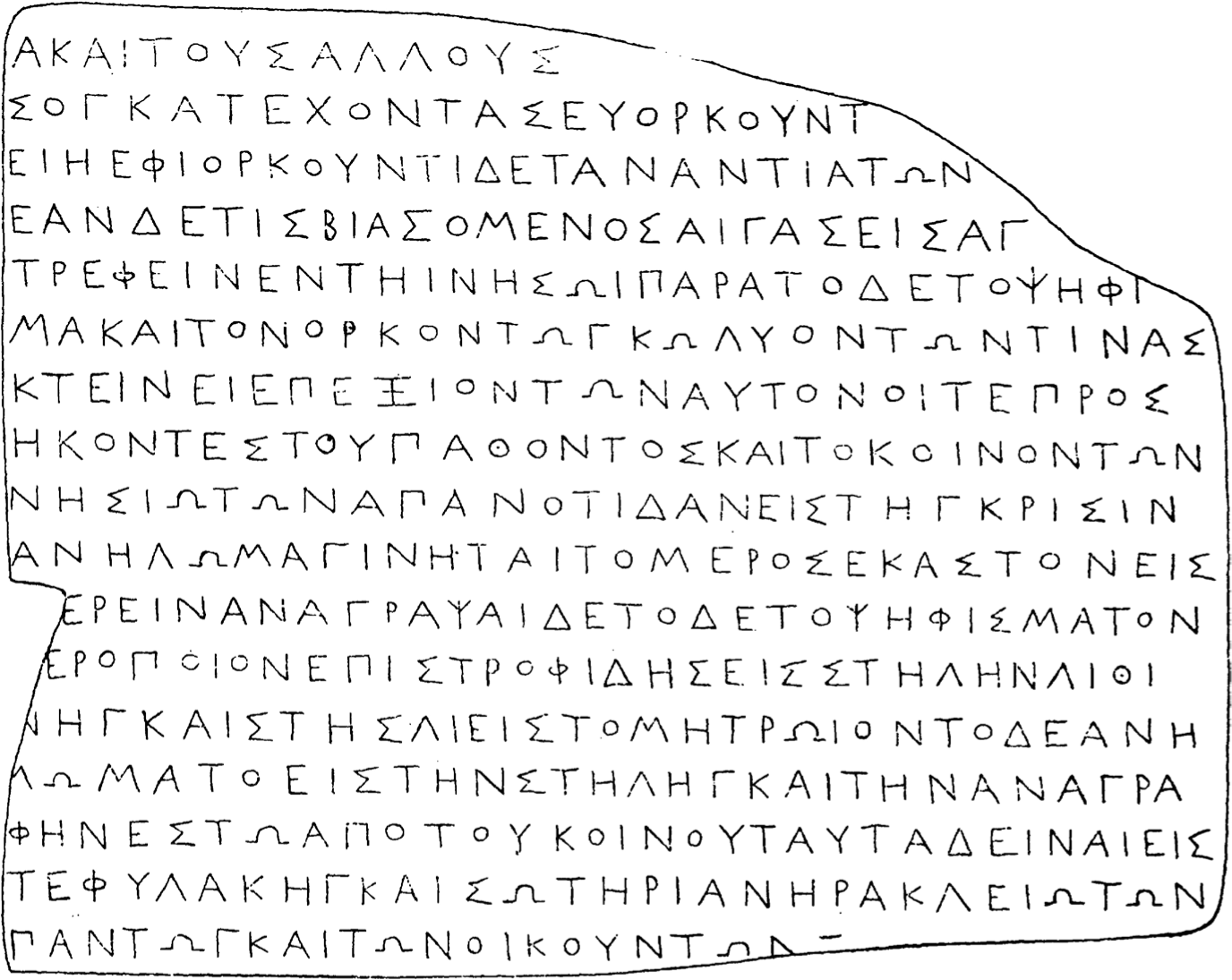
Irakleia goat inscription, after Delamarre.

In the mid-1890s, the French archaeologist Jules Delamarre discovered a fragmentary inscription from Irakleia, in which the Ancient Greek island polis decreed the banning of goats. An analysis by the French historian Louis Robert dated the inscription to the early 3rd century BCE. The inscription states that the inhabitants of the island had sworn an oath, in a formal meeting, to prohibit goats from the island and prosecute the introduction of goats to the island should it result in the deaths of those that attempt to stop it. The inscription was prominently displayed in a shrine to the "Mother of the Gods", as a public record of the political community's decision. According to Robert, by the 20th century CE, the island was largely uninhabited; absentee landlords had used Irakleia to put goats to pasture and the island had become known to travellers as the "goat island".

== Bibliography ==
- Ma, John (2024). "In Search of Polis". Polis: A New History of the Ancient Greek City-State from the Early Iron Age to the End of Antiquity. Princeton University Press. pp. 3–20. doi:10.2307/jj.9446862.6. ISBN 9780691155388. JSTOR jj.9446862.6.
