= Koufonisia =

Group of islands in Greece

Koufonisia Κουφονήσια
- Municipal unit
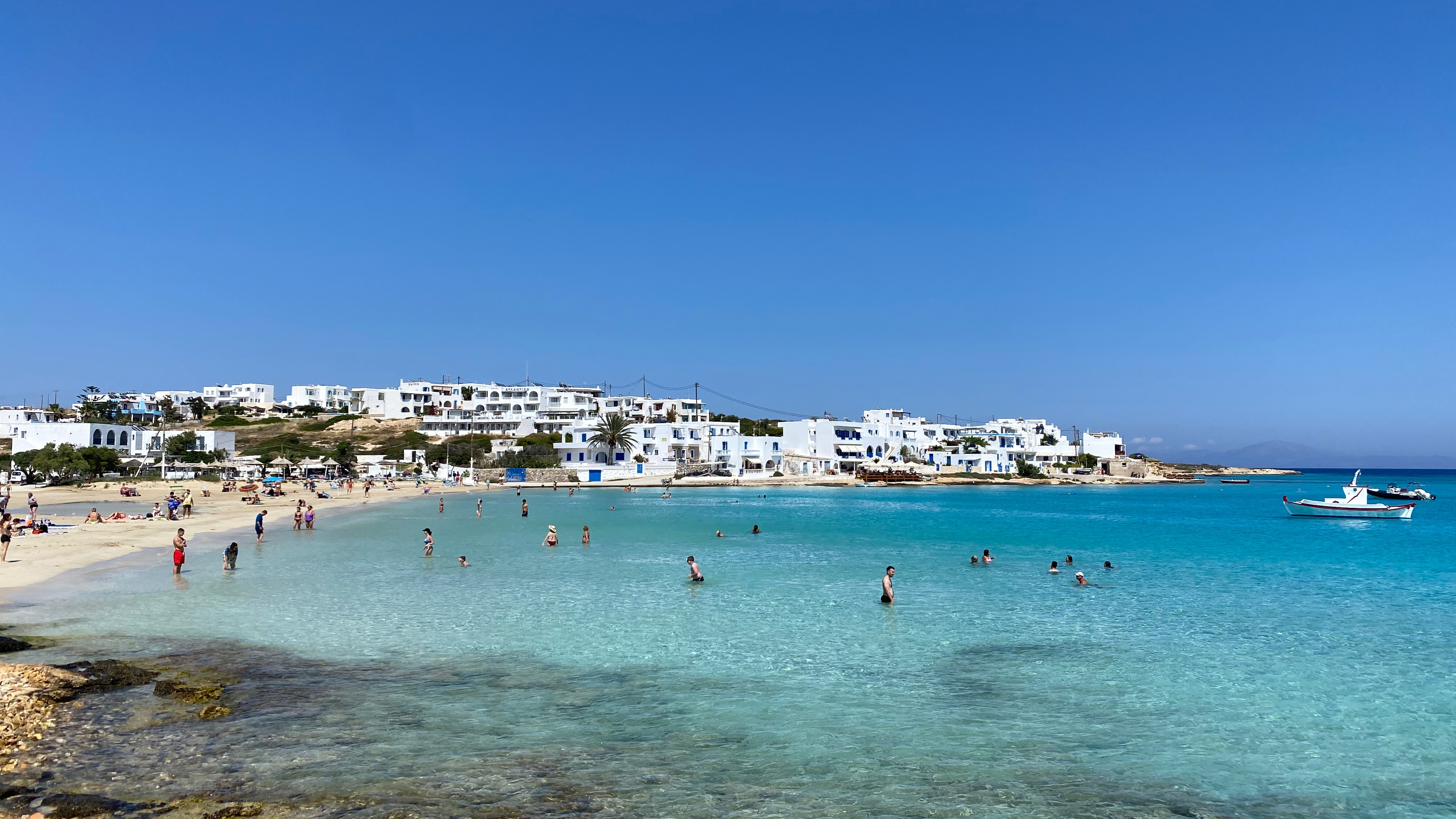

- Location within the regional unit

- Location within Greece
- Coordinates: 36°56′N 25°36′E
- Country: Greece
- Administrative region: South Aegean
- Regional unit: Naxos
- Municipality: Naxos and Lesser Cyclades

Area
  - Municipal unit: 26.025 km^{2} (10.048 sq mi)
- Highest elevation: 114 m (374 ft)
- Lowest elevation: 0 m (0 ft)

Population (2021)
  - Municipal unit: 391
  - Municipal unit density: 15.0/km^{2} (38.9/sq mi)
- Time zone: UTC+2 (EET)
  - Summer (DST): UTC+3 (EEST)
- Postal code: 843 00
- Area code: 22850
- Vehicle registration: EM
- Website: http://www.koufonisia.gr/

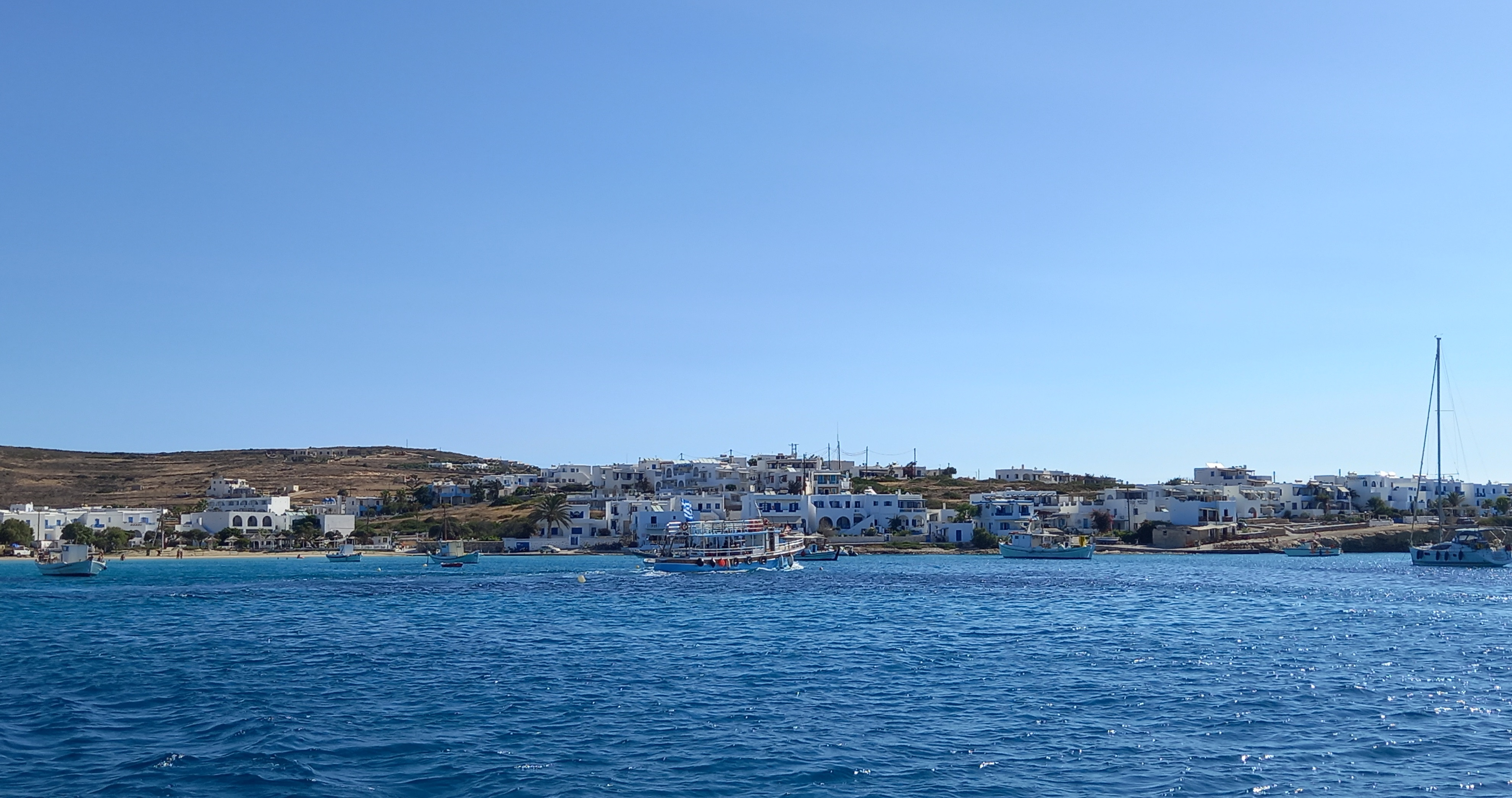
View of Pano Koufonisi

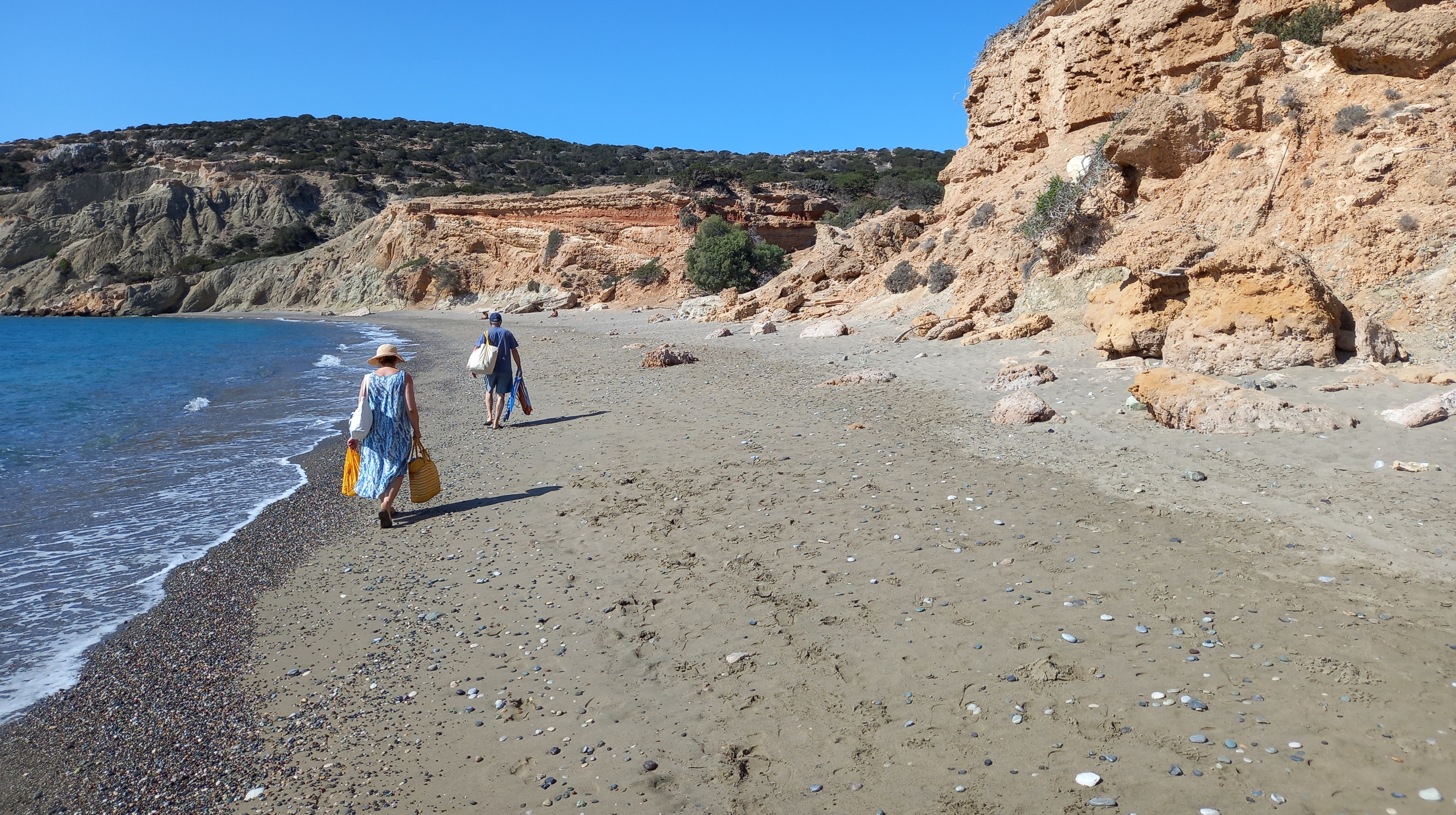
The beach "Nero" at Kato Koufonisi

The Koufonisia (Greek: Κουφονήσια) are a small island complex and a former community in the Cyclades, Greece. Since the 2011 local government reform, it has been part of the Municipality of Naxos and Lesser Cyclades, within which it functions as a municipal unit. The municipal unit has an area of 26.025 km^{2}.

== Geography ==
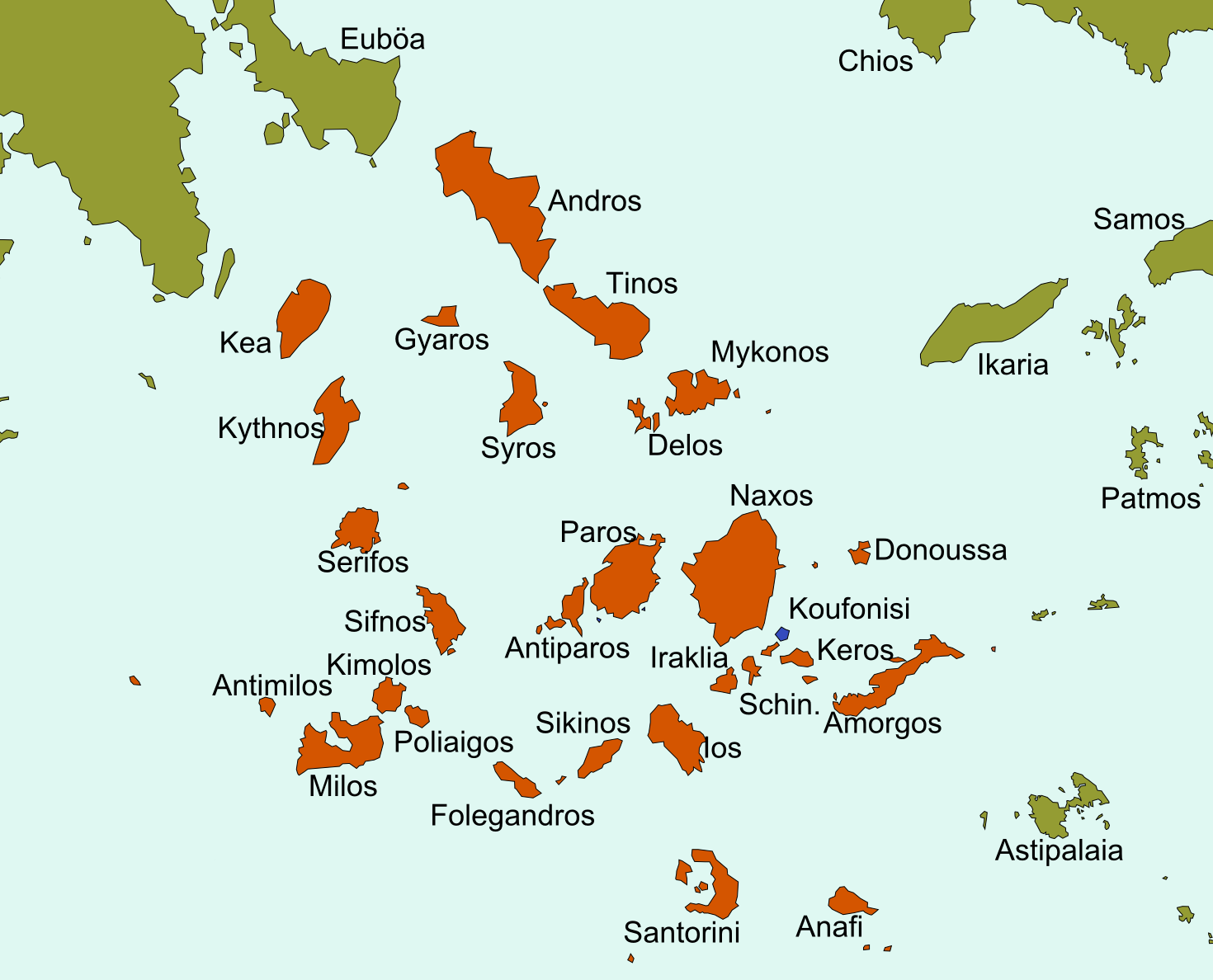
(Pano) Koufonisi

Koufonisia includes three main islands:

- Epano, Pano or Ano Koufonisi (for Upper) often merely called Koufonisi (in Greek: επάνω κουφονήσι)
- Kato Koufonisi (for Lower) (in Greek: Κάτω Κουφονήσι) and
- Keros or Karos (in Greek: Κέρος)

Geographically, they are located on the south-southeast side of Naxos and on the west-northwest of Amorgos and belong to the archipelago of the Lesser East Cyclades. Uninhabited Keros is a protected archaeological site from which many ancient Cycladic art pieces were excavated in the 20th century.

== History ==
There are two proposed explanations for the origin of the name of the island. According to the first, Koufonisia was the ancient name of the gulf between Koufonisia and Glaronisi. The full name was "Koufos Limin", which means lee port, where ships can anchor. According to the second version, which is supported by Manesis, this name was chosen because of the large number of caves and sediments that are found on the island. Anthony Miliarakis, in contrast with these two theories, wrote in his book in 1920 that Pano Koufonisi was known as "Fakousa" and Kato Koufonisi as "Pino".

According to archaeological findings, Koufonisia has been inhabited since prehistoric times. Excavations in Epano Mili brought to light evidence that dates back to the first years of Cycladic civilization. One of the most important findings from this period is a fryer-shaped vessel with a nine-ray star on it, exhibited in Naxos' museum. Excavations on the east shore brought to light remains dating to Hellenistic and Roman times.

In the course of history, Koufonisia followed the fate of the rest of Cyclades islands. They were dominated by the Venetians and the Turks, who, mostly in the 17th century, fought about the governance of the Aegean Sea. Residents of Koufonisia, either because they needed to or because they wanted to, often joined their forces with the residents of Mani or with other pirates, who were using the channel between Pano and Kato Koufonisi as a safe shelter. Koufonisia were set free along with the rest of Cyclades islands and incorporated into the Greek state in 1830.

During the Axis occupation of World War II (1941–1945), the islands' residents faced difficult times. In the postbellum period, the island had 1000 inhabitants. However, many of them migrated to Athens in order to find a job and many men left the islands to work as grummets. Residents were going to the other Greek islands and the mainland by small boats (caiques) and by a ship that was going to Heraclia every eight days. During those years, there was only one doctor in the Lesser Cyclades and when the weather was bad, he could not travel to Koufonisia.

=== Kato (lower) Koufonisi ===
Kato Koufonisi is located next to Pano Koufonisi, Shoinousa and Keros. It has an area of 4.3 square kilometres (1.7 sq mi) and it is almost uninhabited, as there are only a few rural houses. The most distinctive sight of the island is the small church of Panagia that is built on a jetty, on top of ancient ruins. Only fish and tourist boats anchor in its small port.

=== Pano Koufonisi or Koufonisi ===
Pano Koufonisi is the smallest and most densely populated island of the Cycladic island group. It has an area of 5.8 km^{2} (2 sq mi) and 391 residents (2021). The main occupation of the locals is fishing and, in recent years, tourism. Compared to its population, it has one of the biggest fishing fleets in Greece. The white windmill on the east side of the port can be seen by visitors when they arrive on the island. The settlement of Chora (the generic name given an island's main settlement) on the southwest coast of Koufonisi contains examples of Cycladic architecture.

== Culture ==
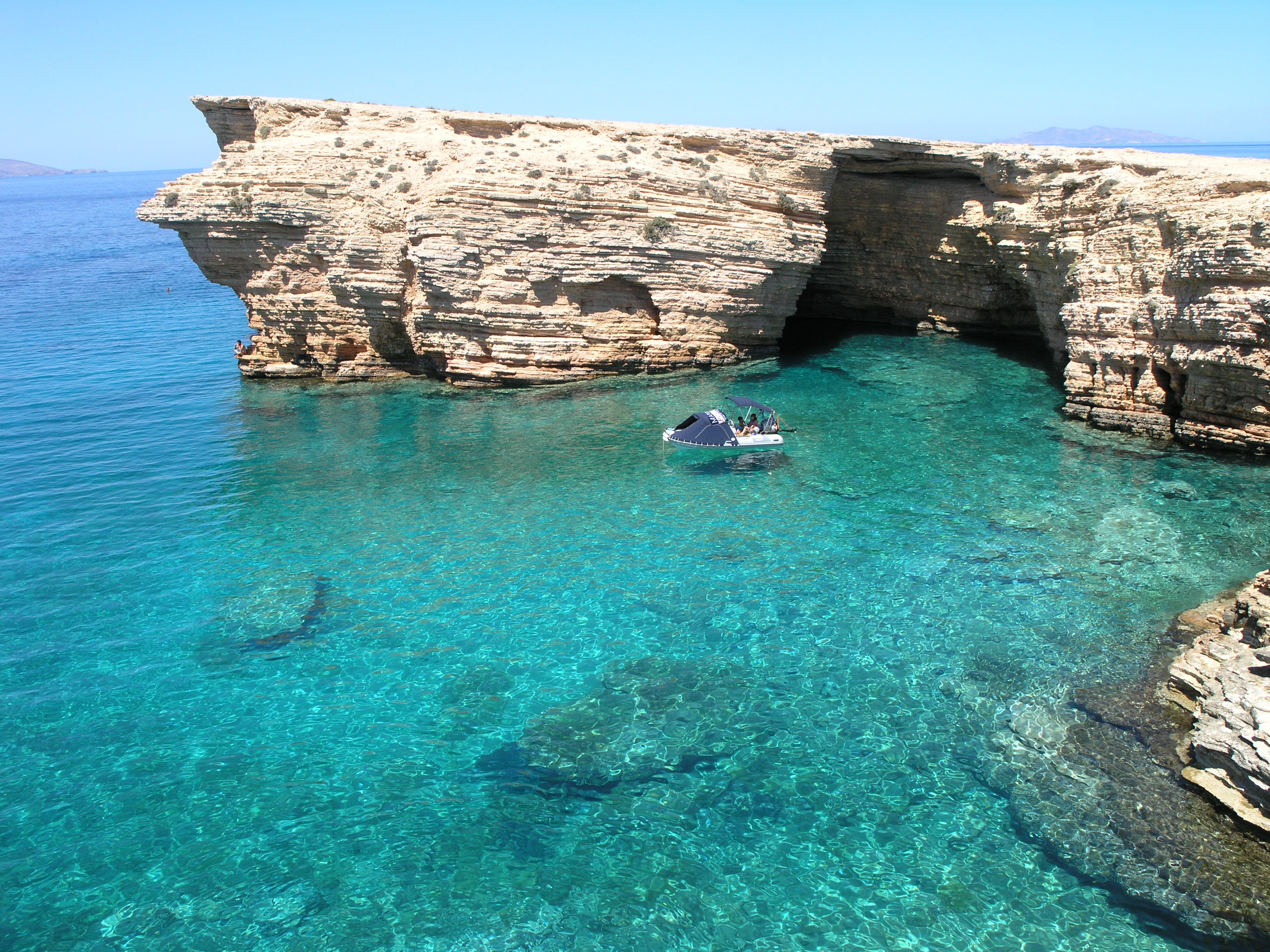
Pori

=== Sightseeing ===
Koufonisi is an increasingly popular tourist destination, and sights include the ports, the piscatorial shelter, the carnagio, the windmills and the churches of Agios Georgios, Agios Nikolaos and Profitis Ilias. The fishermen in their small boats (caiques) is a characteristic picture of the island. The full-moon nights and Keros' view in the moonlight are a unique experience for the visitors. According to the residents of Koufonisi, the contour of the deserted island at night resembles a female, prostrated Cycladic statuette. The church of Virgin Mary is one of the most important sights on Koufonisi, whereas in Keros apart from the archaeological findings, one can enjoy the sunrise.

=== Architecture ===
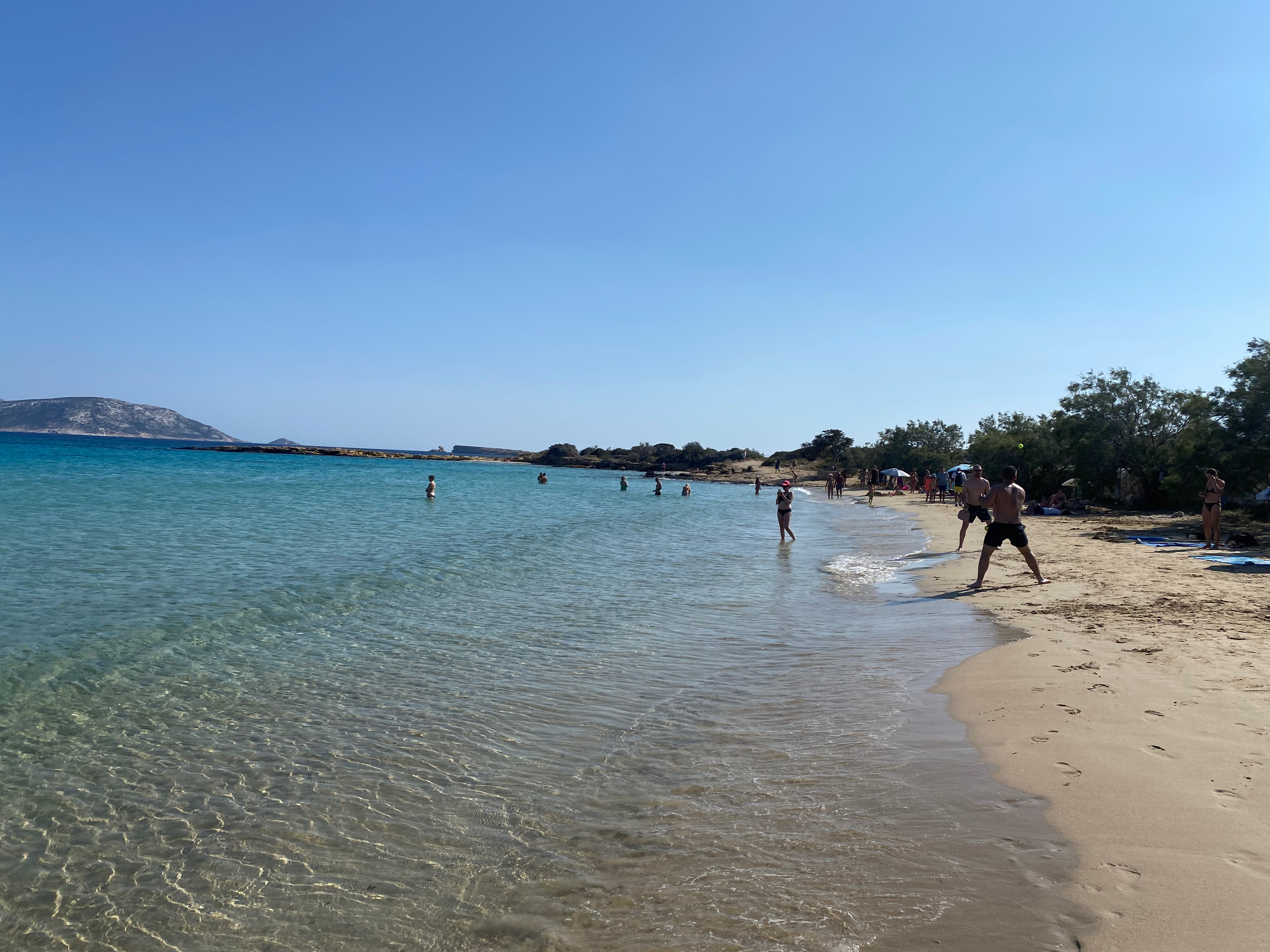
Fanos beach

Cycladic architecture is prevalent on Koufonisia. The exterior surfaces of houses and all other buildings are painted white and blue in order to match with the boundless blue of the Aegean Sea and create a modern but also magic atmosphere. The interior of a typical house of Koufonisia consisted of three rooms: a bedroom, a kitchen and a large room used as living-room. The roof, known as "Steosa" was usually made of reeds, wood, earth and a kind of wood taken from fida, called "kontarida".

=== Events ===
Saint George is the patron saint of the island. On his name day, the 23 April, there is a procession of the saint's icon over streets covered in rose petals. After the end of the procession, a traditional feast takes place in the village's square. All the taverns of the island take part in the feast. Easter is celebrated traditionally on Koufonisia. On Good Friday the port is floodlit by torches and on Easter the sky is full of fireworks. On the last Saturday of June the "feast of the fisherman" is organised on Koufonisia. Young people dance traditional dances and the most popular island songs are heard. Fresh fish, snacks and drinks are offered.

The feasts are characteristic of Koufonisia and give a traditional color to the island. A big celebration is held on 20 July in the name of Prophet Elias and on 15 August. On the 15 August the celebration of Panagia (Virgin Mary) takes place at the little church of Kato Koufonisi. After the service the people offer food and then they are carried back to Pano Koufonisi by the fishing boats. They compete with each other who will get there first and when they are back, a feast takes place. Last but not least, the name day of Agios Nikolaos and Christmas are celebrated in a special way on Koufonisia- the most characteristic moment is when the older residents of the island sing the Christmas carols. During the epitaph's procession the sky is lit by fireworks and events are organized on the main beach of the island.
