= Cyclades =

Greek island group in the Aegean Sea

Coordinates: 37°00′N 25°10′E

Cyclades Νομός Κυκλάδων
- Former prefecture
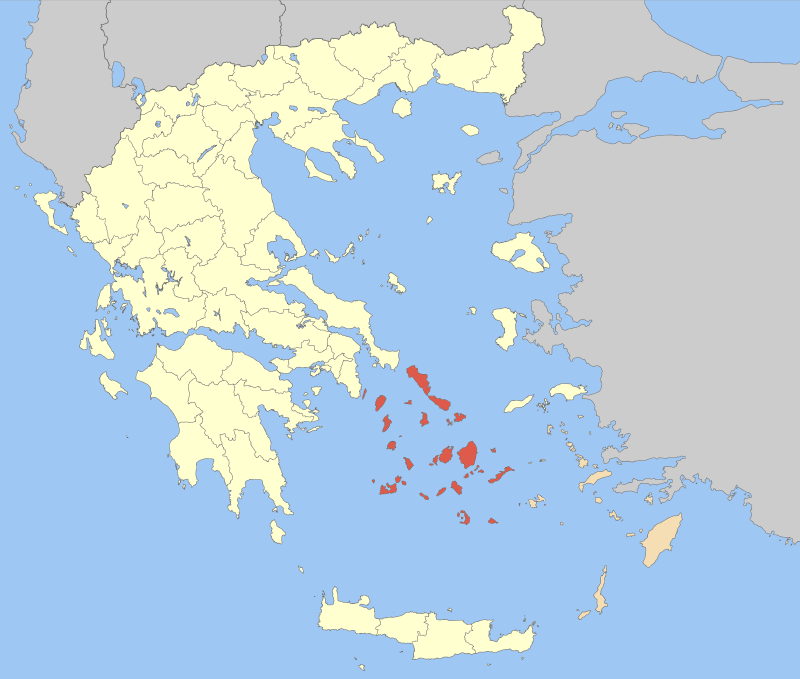
- Location of Cyclades in Greece

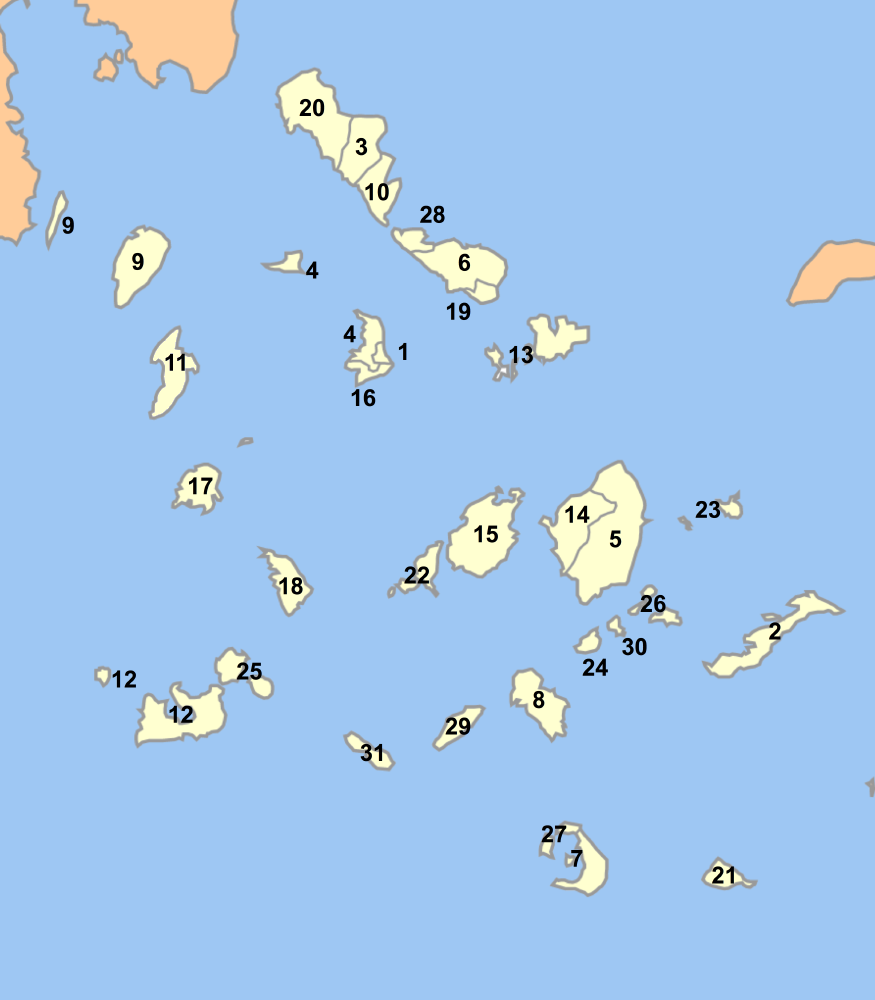
- Location of municipalities within Cyclades Prefecture, Delos and Mykonos numbered 13
- Country: Greece
- Periphery: South Aegean
- Established: 1833
- Disestablished: 2010
- Capital: Ermoupoli
- Subdivisions: List: 9 provinces; 20 municipalities; 11 communities

Area
  - Total: 2,572 km^{2} (993 sq mi)
  - Rank: 23rd

Population (2005)
  - Total: 119,549
  - Rank: 29th
  - Density: 46.48/km^{2} (120.4/sq mi)
  - Rank: 34th
- Postal codes: 84x xx
- Area codes: 228x0
- ISO 3166 code: GR-82
- Vehicle registration: ΕΜ

The Cyclades (/ˈsɪklədiːz/; Greek: Κυκλάδες, romanized: Kykládes, IPA: [ciˈkla.ðes]) is an archipelago in the Aegean Sea, southeast of the Greek mainland and a former administrative prefecture of Greece. The archipelago is one of Greece's island groups which constitute the Aegean archipelago. One of the group's constituent islands Delos is significant and was sacred to Ancient Greek religion, thus the islands surrounding (κyκλόω, kyklóō cognate to cycle) it take after it (Κυκλάδες νήσοι, Kykládes nísoi, 'surrounding islands').

The largest island of the Cyclades is Naxos; the most populated, however, is Syros.

== History ==
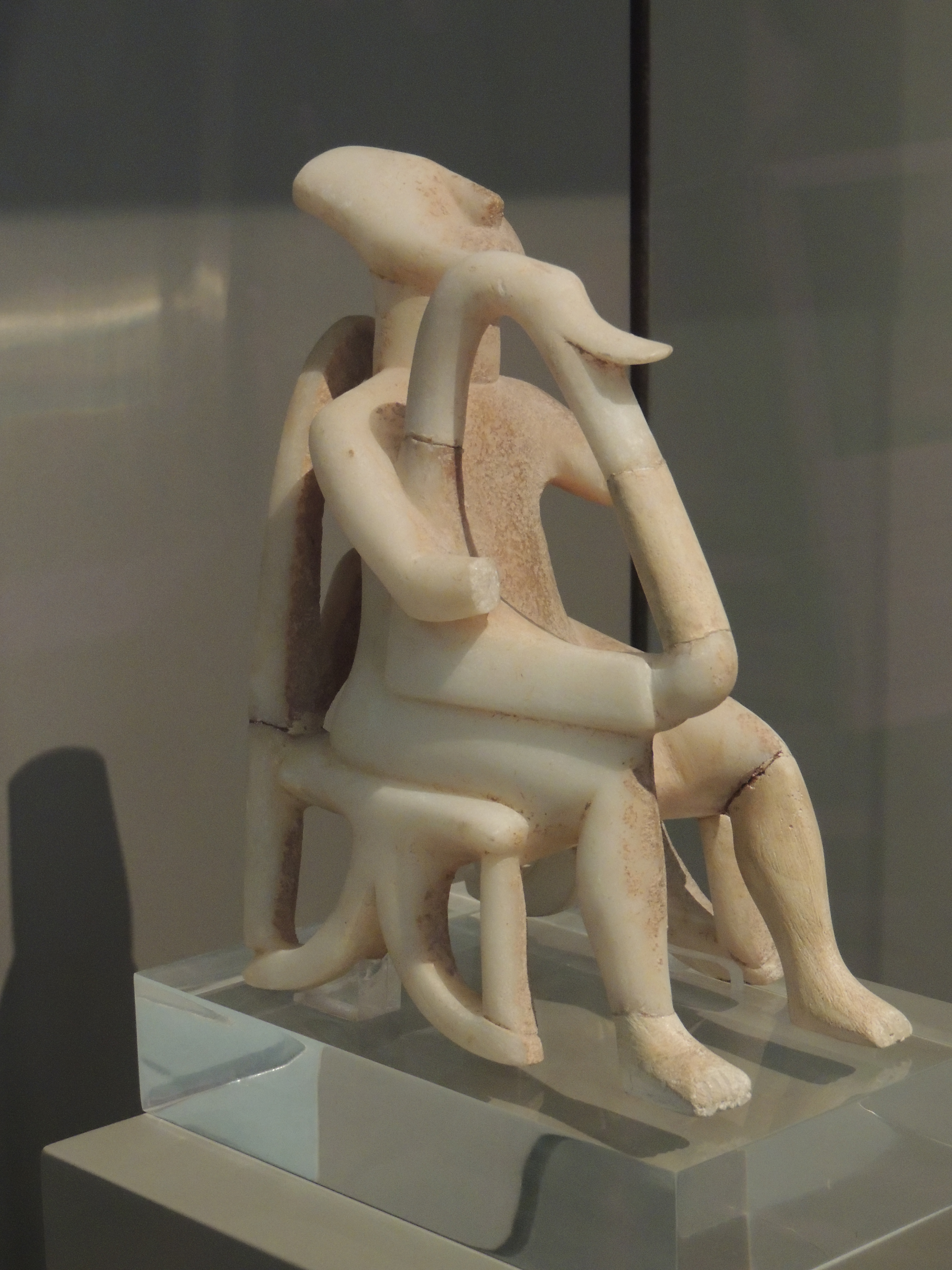
Harp player, example of Cycladic art, at the National Archeological Museum, Athens

The significant Late Neolithic and Early Bronze Age Cycladic culture is best known for its schematic, flat sculptures carved out of the islands' pure white marble centuries before the great Middle Bronze Age Minoan civilization arose in Crete to the south. These figures have been looted from burials to satisfy a thriving Cycladic antiquities market since the early 20th century.

A distinctive Neolithic culture amalgamating Anatolian and mainland Greek elements arose in the western Aegean before 4000 BCE, based on emmer and wild-type barley, sheep and goats, pigs, and tuna that were apparently speared from small boats (Rutter). Excavated sites include Chalandriani, Phylakopi, Skarkos, Saliagos and Kephala (on Kea) with signs of copper working. Each of the small Cycladic islands could support no more than a few thousand people, though Late Cycladic boat models show that fifty oarsmen could be assembled from the scattered communities (Rutter). When the highly organized palace-culture of Crete arose, the islands faded into insignificance, with the exception of Delos, which retained its archaic reputation as a sanctuary throughout antiquity and until the emergence of Christianity.

=== Archaeology ===
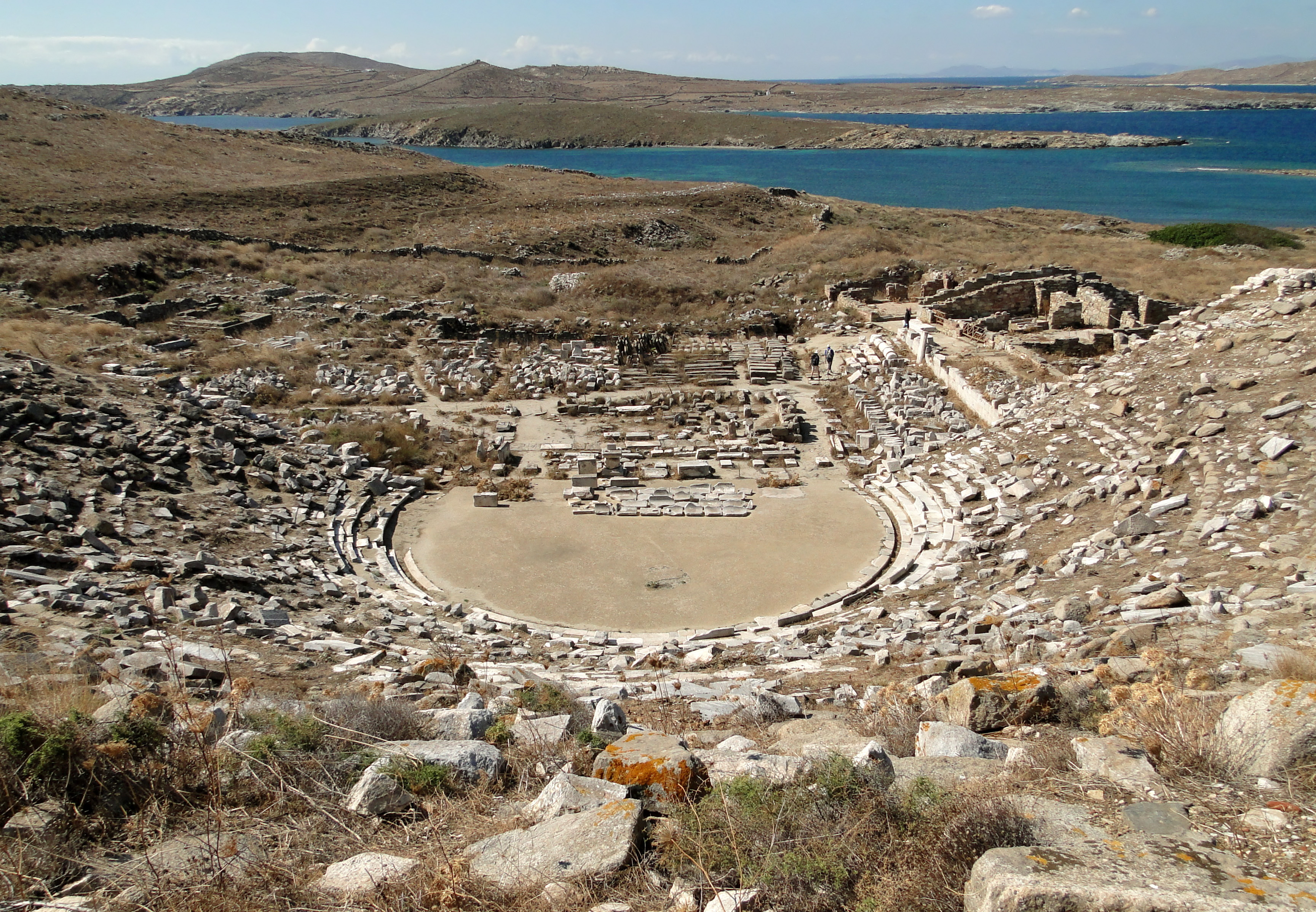
Ancient theatre, Delos

The first archaeological excavations of the 1880s, undertaken by antiquaries such as Theodore Bent at Antiparos in early 1884, were followed by systematic work by the British School at Athens and by Christos Tsountas, who investigated burial sites on several islands in 1898–1899 and coined the term "Cycladic civilization". Interest lagged, and then picked up in the mid-20th century, as collectors competed for the modern-looking figures that seemed so similar to sculpture by Jean Arp or Constantin Brâncuși. Sites were looted and a brisk trade in forgeries arose. The context for many of these Cycladic figurines has been mostly destroyed and their meaning may never be completely understood.

Another intriguing and mysterious object is that of the Cycladic frying pans. More accurate archaeology has revealed the broad outlines of a farming and seafaring culture that had emigrated from Anatolia c. 5000 BCE. Early Cycladic culture evolved in three phases, between c. 3300 – 2000 BCE, when it was increasingly swamped in the rising influence of Minoan Crete. The culture of mainland Greece contemporary with Cycladic culture is known as the Helladic period.

In recent decades the Cyclades have become popular with European and other tourists, and as a result there have been problems with erosion, pollution, and water shortages.

== Geography ==
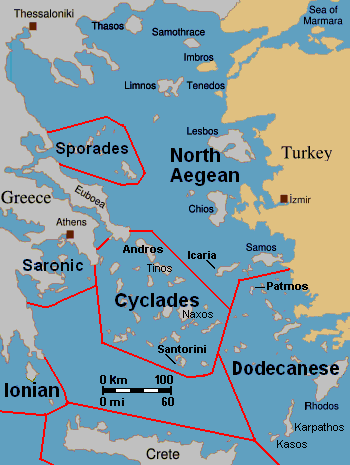
The Cyclades encircle the sacred island of Delos

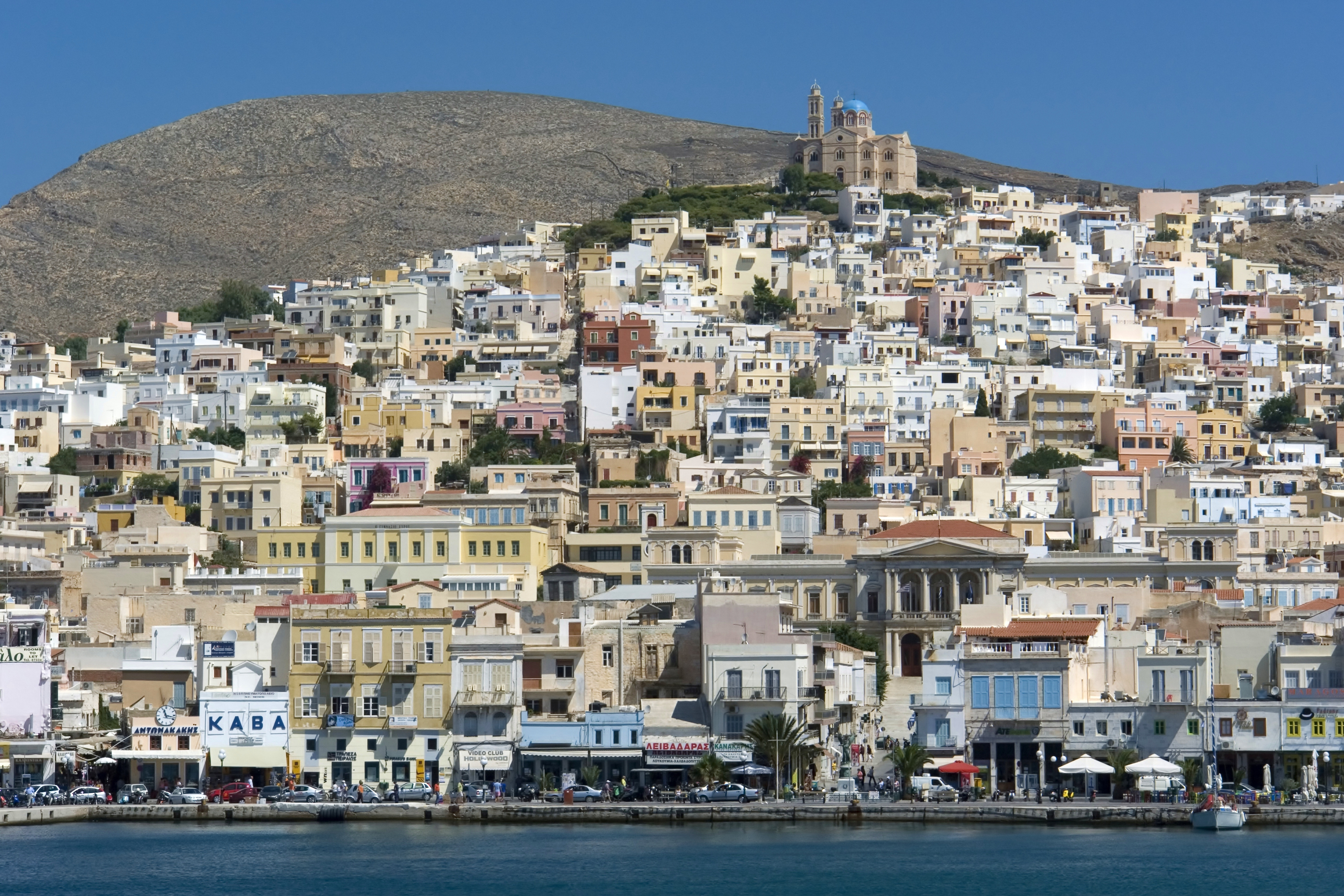
Ermoupoli, capital of the Cyclades. Syros

Santorini

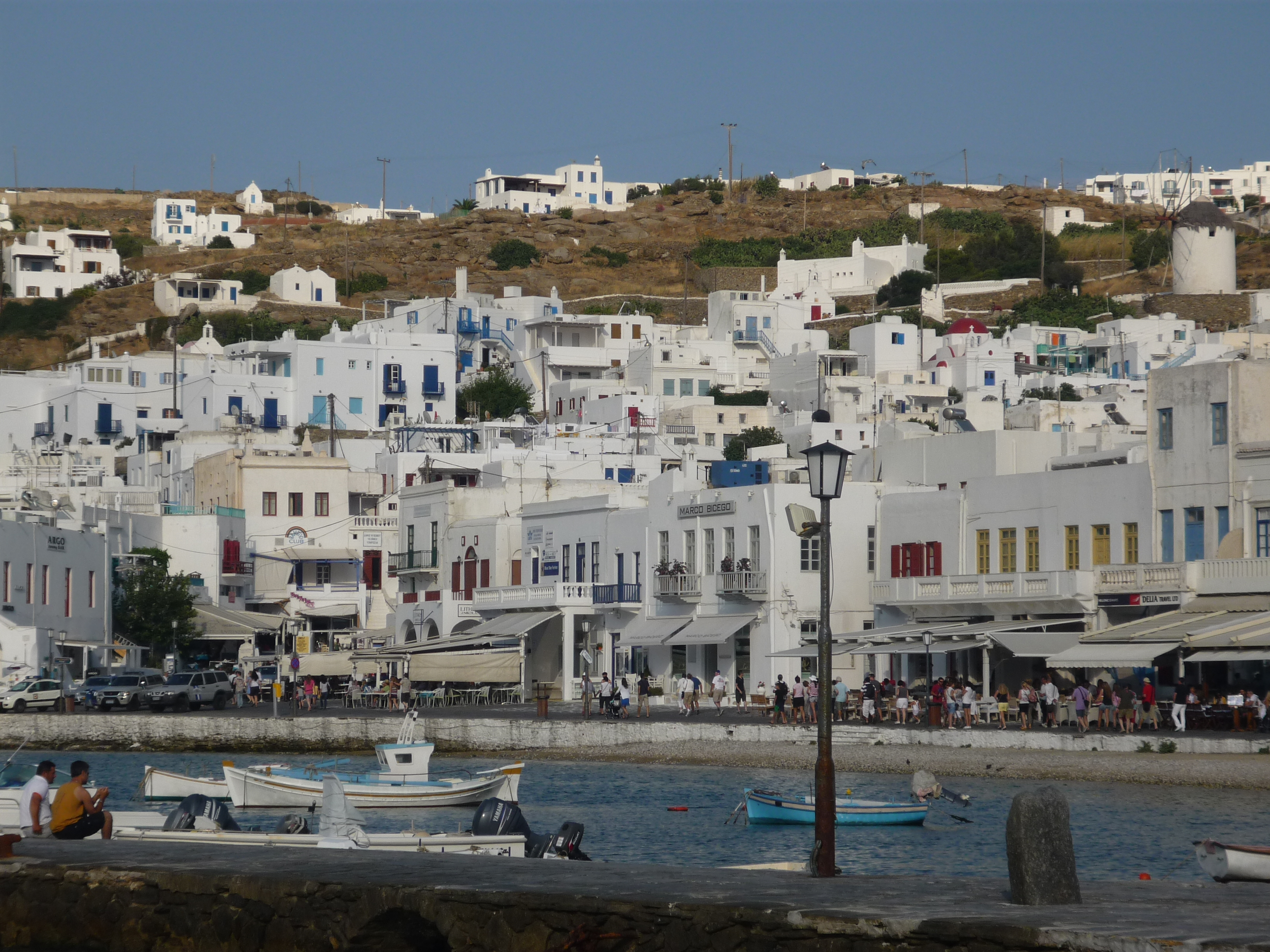
Mykonos

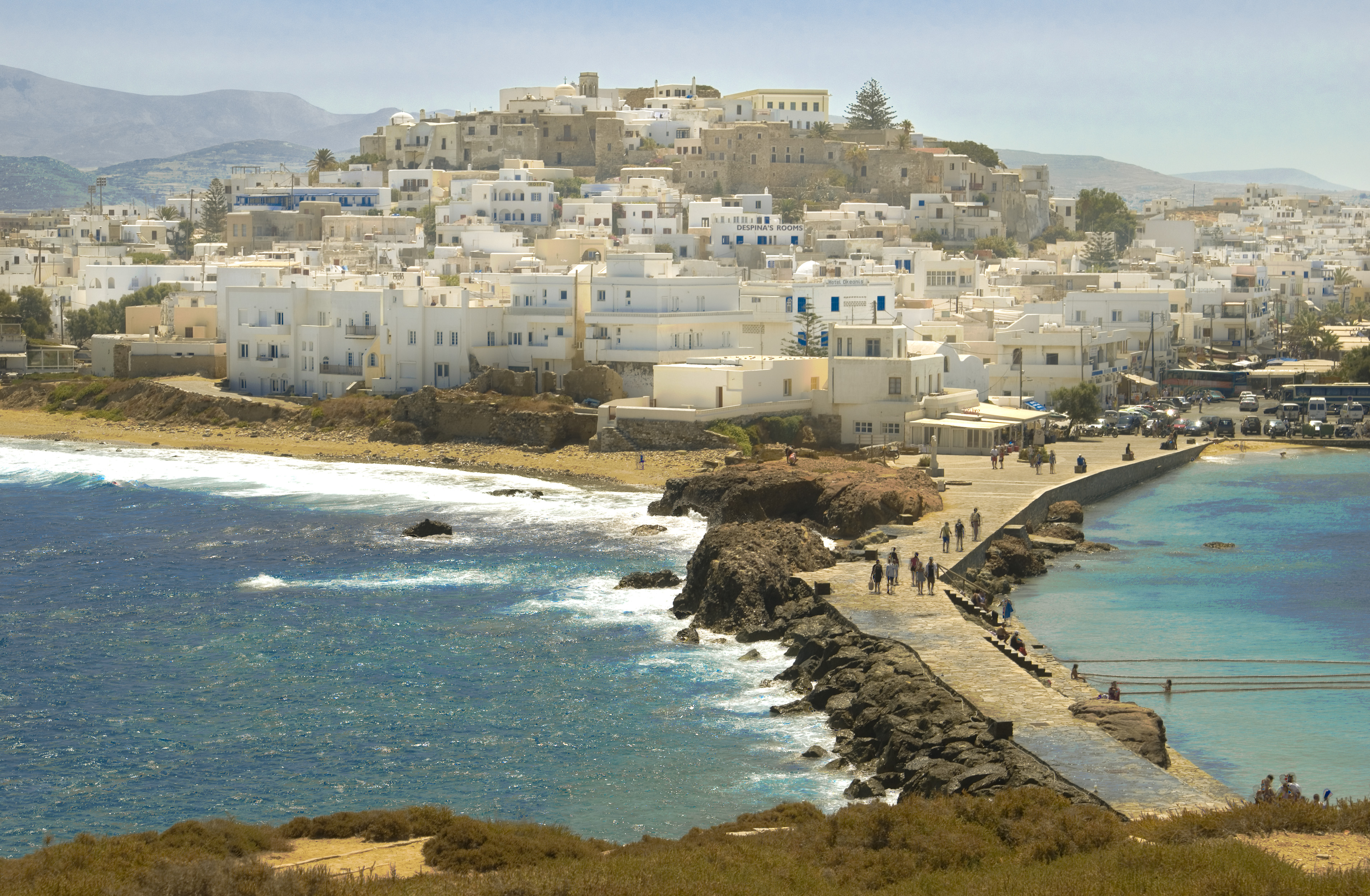
Naxos

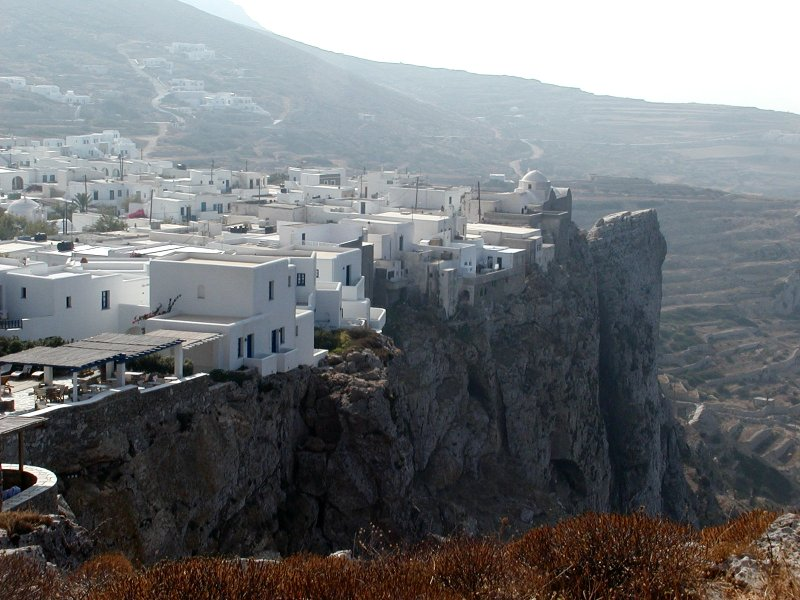
Folegandros

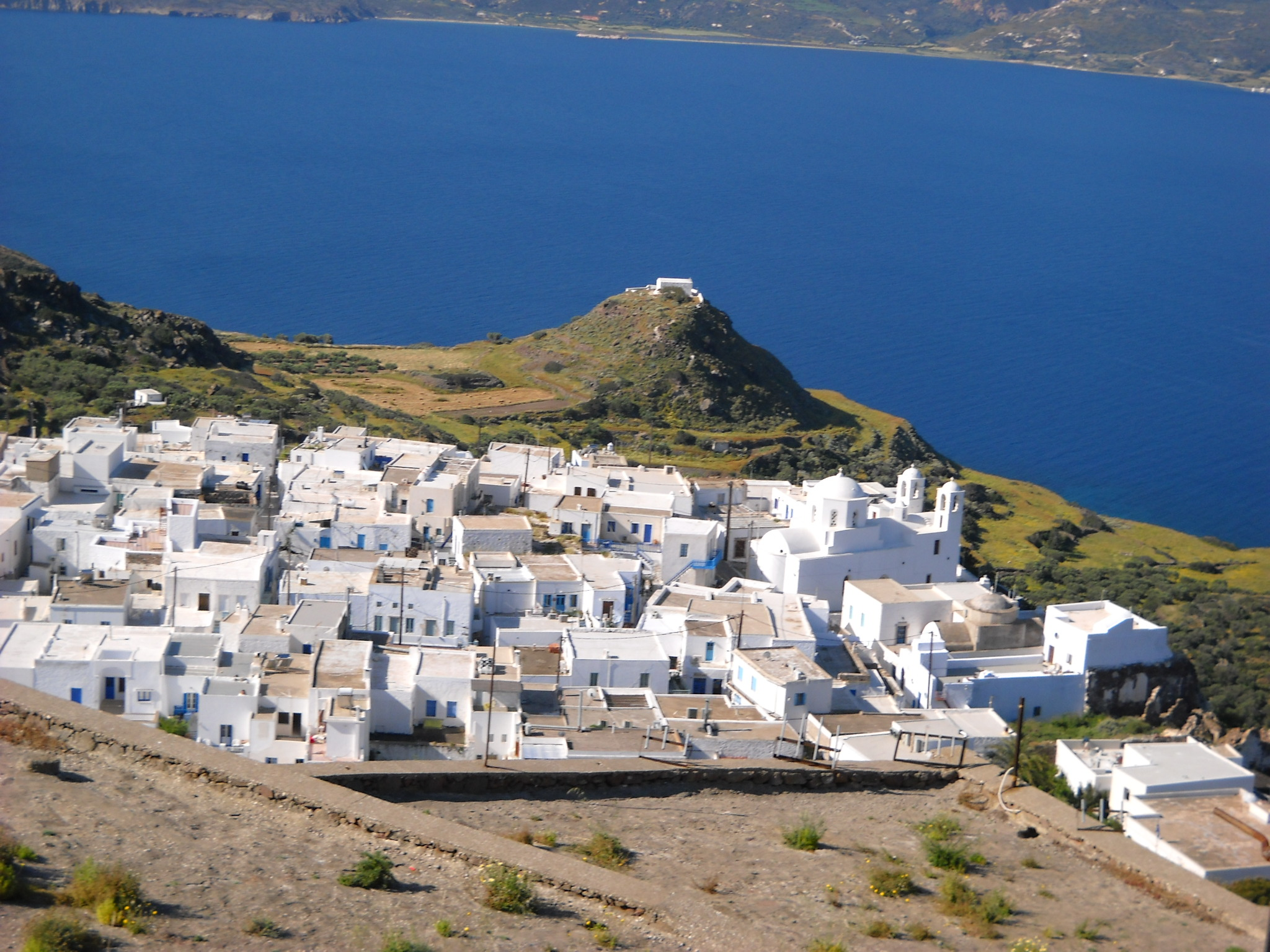
Milos

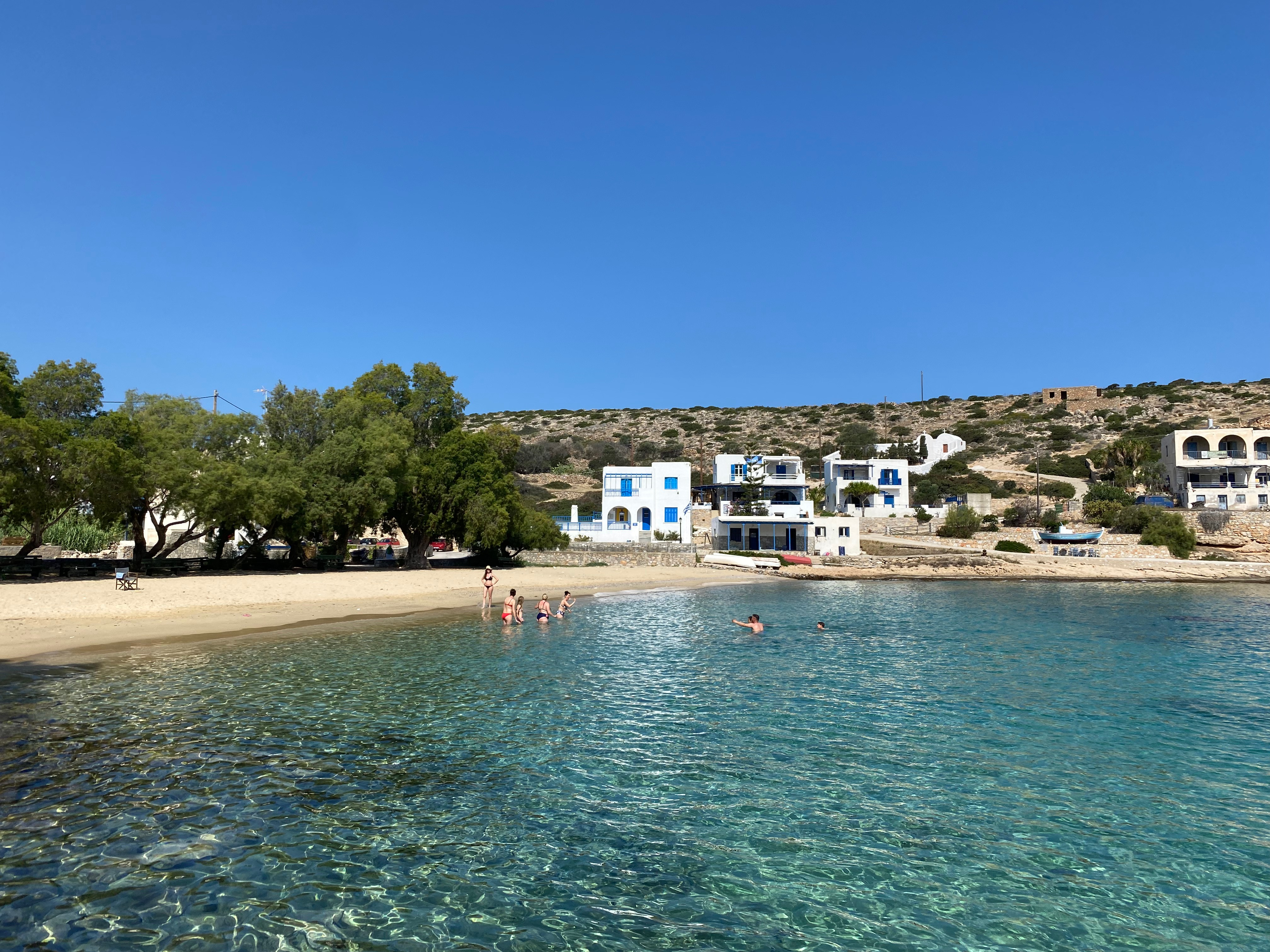
Irakleia

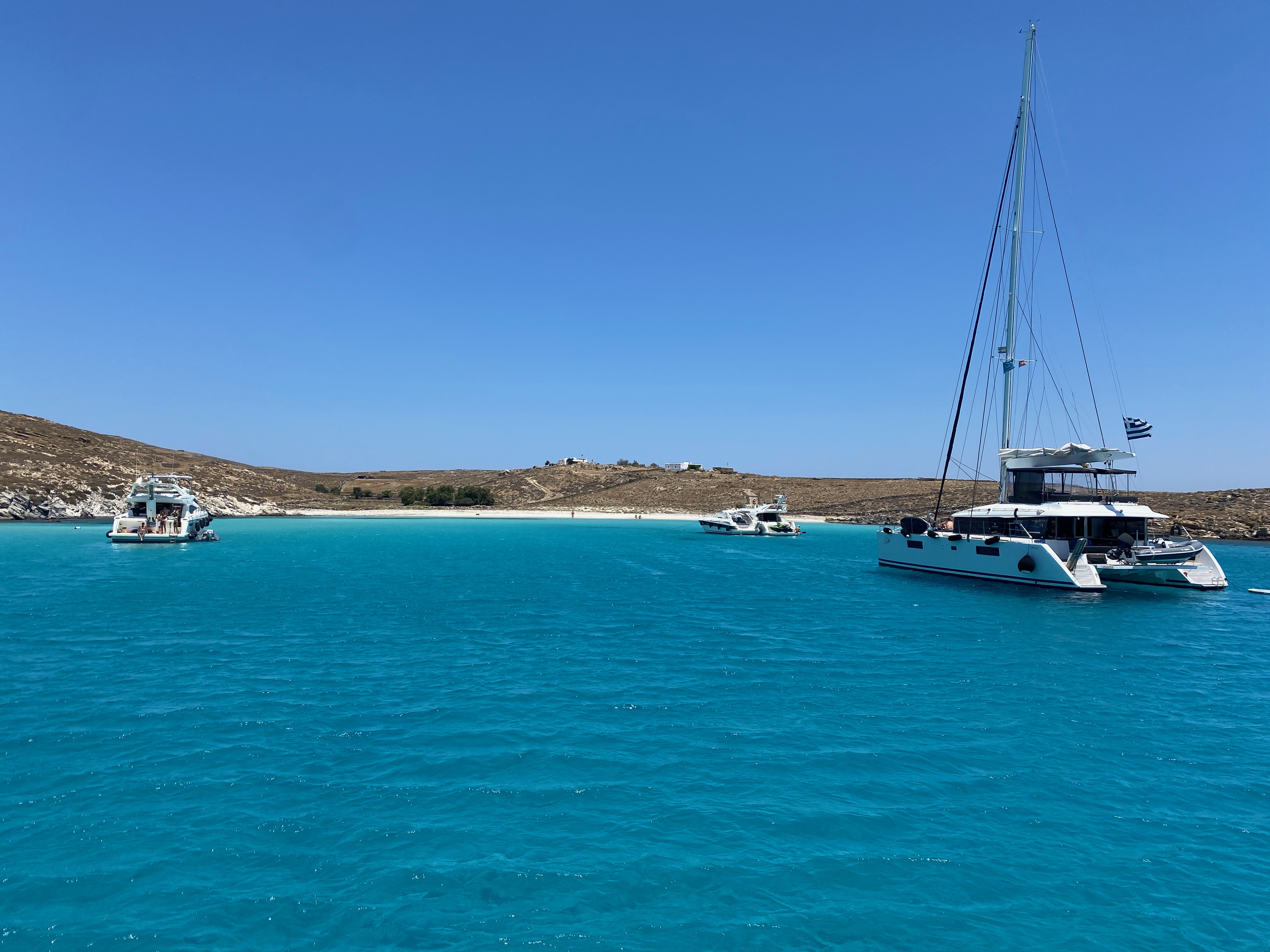
Rineia

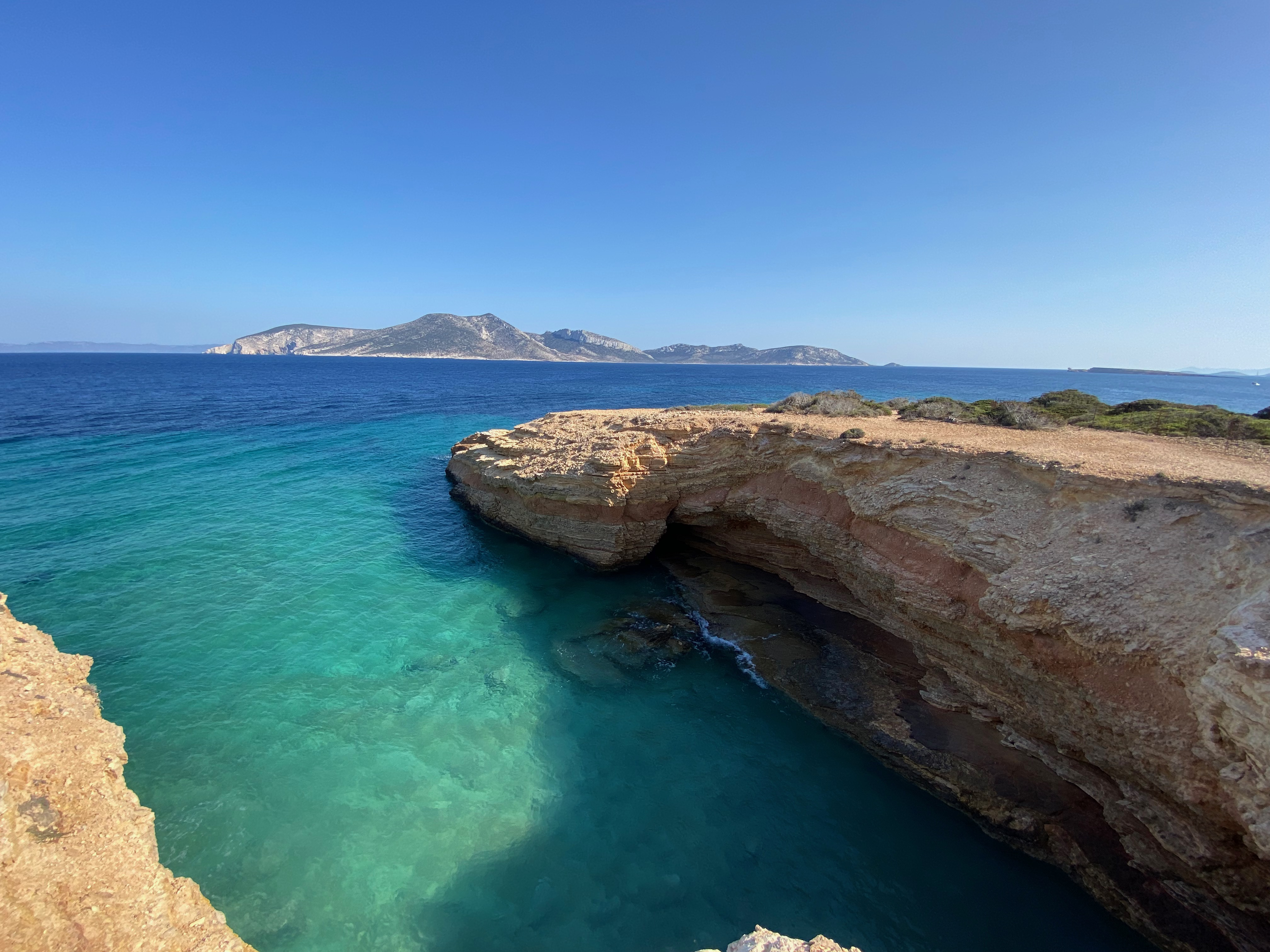
Koufonisi

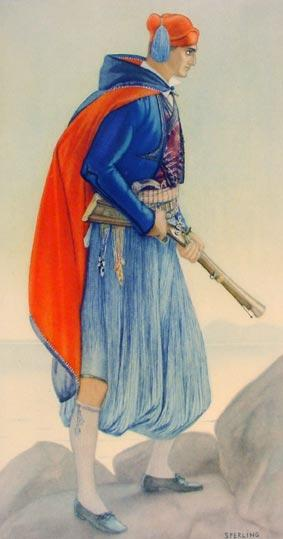
Traditional vraka (breeches) in the dress of the Aegean islands

The Cyclades includes about 220 islands, the major ones being Amorgos, Anafi, Andros, Antiparos, Delos, Ios, Kea, Kimolos, Kythnos, Milos, Mykonos, Naxos, Paros, Folegandros, Serifos, Sifnos, Sikinos, Syros, Tinos, and Thira or Santoríni. There are also many minor islands (the Lesser Cyclades) including Donousa, Eschati, Gyaros, Irakleia, Koufonisia, Makronisos, Rineia, and Schoinousa. The name "Cyclades" refers to the islands forming a circle ("circular islands") around the sacred island of Delos. Most of the smaller islands are uninhabited.

Ermoupoli on Syros is the chief town and administrative center of the former prefecture.

The islands are peaks of a submerged mountainous terrain, with the exception of two volcanic islands, Milos and Santorini. The climate is generally dry and mild, but with the exception of Naxos, the soil is not very fertile; agricultural produce includes wine, fruit, wheat, olive oil, and tobacco. Lower temperatures are registered in higher elevations and these areas do not usually see wintry weather.

The Cyclades are bounded to the south by the Sea of Crete.

== Administration ==
The Cyclades Prefecture (Greek: Νομός Κυκλάδων) was one of the prefectures of Greece. As a part of the 2011 Kallikratis government reform, the prefecture was abolished, and its territory was divided into nine regional units of the South Aegean region:

- Andros
- Kea-Kythnos
- Milos
- Mykonos
- Naxos
- Paros
- Thira
- Syros
- Tinos

=== Municipalities and communities ===
The prefecture was subdivided into the following municipalities and communities. These have been reorganised in the 2011 Kallikratis reform as well.

Municipality	YPES code	Seat (if different)	Postal code	Area code
Amorgos	3101		840 08	22850–2
Andros (town)	3103		845 00	22820–2
Ano Syros	3105		841 00	22810–8
Drymalia	3107	Chalkeio Naxou	843 02	22850
Ermoupoli	3109		841 00	22810–2
Exomvourgo	3108	Kampos	842 00	22850–5
Ios	3112		840 01	22860–9
Kea	3113	Ioulis	840 02	22880–2
Korthio	3115	Ormos Korthiou	845 02	22820–6
Kythnos	3117		840 06	22810–3
Milos	3118		848 00	22870–2
Mykonos	3119		846 00	22890–2
Naxos	3120		843 00	22850–2
Paros	3123		844 00	22840–2
Poseidonia	3124		841 00	22810–4
Santorini	3111		847 00	22860–2
Serifos	3125		840 02	22810–5
Sifnos	3127		840 03	22840–3
Tinos	3129		842 00	22830–2
Ydrousa	3130	Gavrio	845 01	22820–7
Community	YPES code	Seat (if different)	Postal code	Area code
Anafi	3102		840 09	22860–6
Antiparos	3104		840 07	22840–6
Donousa	3106		843 00	22850–5
Folegandros	3131		840 11	22860
Irakleia	3110		843 00	22870–7
Kimolos	3114		840 04	22870–5
Koufonisia	3116		843 00	22870–7
Oia	3121		847 02	22860–7
Panormos	3122		842 01	22830–3
Schoinousa	3128		843 00	22870–7
Sikinos	3126		840 10	22860–5

=== Provinces ===
- Province of Amorgos: Amorgos
- Province of Andros: Andros
- Province of Kea: Ioulis
- Province of Milos: Milos
- Province of Naxos: Naxos
- Province of Paros: Paroikia
- Province of Syros: Ermoupoli
- Province of Tinos: Tinos
- Province of Thira: Thira

Note: Provinces no longer hold any legal status in Greece.

== Cuisine ==
Local specialities of the Cyclades include:

- Brantáda, cod fillet fish dish
- Fava Santorinis (made from Lathyrus clymenum)
- Fourtalia (Andros), omelette
- Kakavia (soup)
- Matsata, pasta
- Kalasouna (Naxos)
- Kalogeros (Naxos)
- Tomatokeftedes
- Various cheeses, such as Kopanisti Mykonou, Manoura Sifnou, Armexia, Malaxia, Chloro, San Michali etc.
- Loutza, similar to the Cypriot lountza
- Strapatsada (Koskosela)
- Sfougato (omelette)
- Lazarakia (dessert)
- Melitinia (dessert)
- Melopita (dessert)
- Santorini (wine)

== See also ==
- Aegean cat
- List of islands of Greece
- Minoan eruption
- Mosaics of Delos
- Nisiotika music
- Santorini wine
