= Naxos (regional unit) =

Naxos Περιφερειακή ενότητα Νάξου
- Regional unit
- Municipalities of the Cyclades

- Naxos within Greece

- Location within Greece
- Coordinates: 37°0′N 25°30′E
- Country: Greece
- Administrative region: South Aegean
- Seat: Naxos (city)

Area
  - Total: 622.1 km^{2} (240.2 sq mi)

Population (2021)
  - Total: 22,539
  - Density: 36.23/km^{2} (93.84/sq mi)
- Time zone: UTC+2 (EET)
  - Summer (DST): UTC+3 (EEST)

Naxos (Greek: Περιφερειακή ενότητα Νάξου) is one of the regional units of Greece. It is part of the region of South Aegean. The regional unit covers the islands of Naxos, Amorgos, Donousa, Irakleia, Schoinoussa, the Koufonisia islands and several smaller islands in the Aegean Sea.

== Administration ==
As a part of the 2011 Kallikratis government reform, the regional unit Naxos was created out of part of the former Cyclades Prefecture. It is subdivided into 2 municipalities. These are (number as in the map in the infobox):

- Amorgos (2)
- Naxos and Lesser Cyclades (Naxos & Mikres Kyklades, 13)

== Province ==
The province of Naxos (Greek: Επαρχία Νάξου) was one of the provinces of the Cyclades Prefecture. It had the same territory as the present regional unit. It was abolished in 2006.
