= Donousa =

Greek island in the Aegean Sea

Donoussa Δονούσα
- Municipal unit
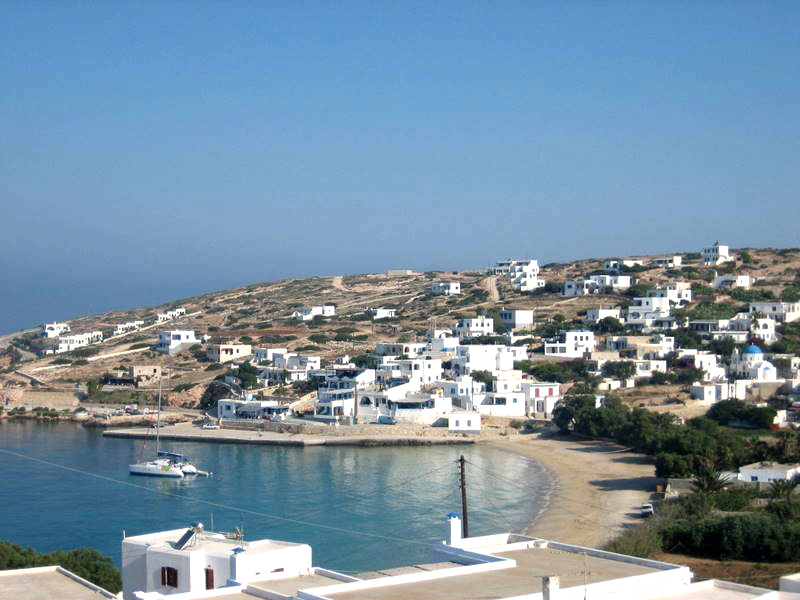

- Location within the regional unit

- Location within Greece
- Coordinates: 37°06′30″N 25°48′50″E
- Country: Greece
- Administrative region: South Aegean
- Regional unit: Naxos
- Municipality: Naxos and Lesser Cyclades

Area
  - Municipal unit: 13.750 km^{2} (5.309 sq mi)
- Highest elevation: 385 m (1,263 ft)
- Lowest elevation: 0 m (0 ft)

Population (2021)
  - Municipal unit: 213
  - Municipal unit density: 15.5/km^{2} (40.1/sq mi)
- Time zone: UTC+2 (EET)
  - Summer (DST): UTC+3 (EEST)
- Postal code: 843 00
- Area code: 22850
- Vehicle registration: EM
- Website: www.donoussa.gr

Donousa (Greek: Δονούσα, also Δενούσα Denousa), and sometimes spelled Donoussa, is an island and a former community in the Cyclades, Greece. Since the 2011 local government reform it is part of the municipality Naxos and Lesser Cyclades, of which it is a municipal unit. Donousa is the easternmost island of the Lesser Cyclades.

== Geography ==
Donoussa is located 16 km (10 mi) east of the island of Naxos and about 25 km (16 mi) north of Amorgos. Its area is 13.75 square kilometres (5.31 sq mi) and its highest point is 385 metres (1,263 ft). Its population is 213 inhabitants (2021 census), most of which live in the main settlement Donousa (also Stavros). Other villages include Mersini (on the southeastern coast), Kalotaritissa (near its northern coastline) and Charavgi (in the south).

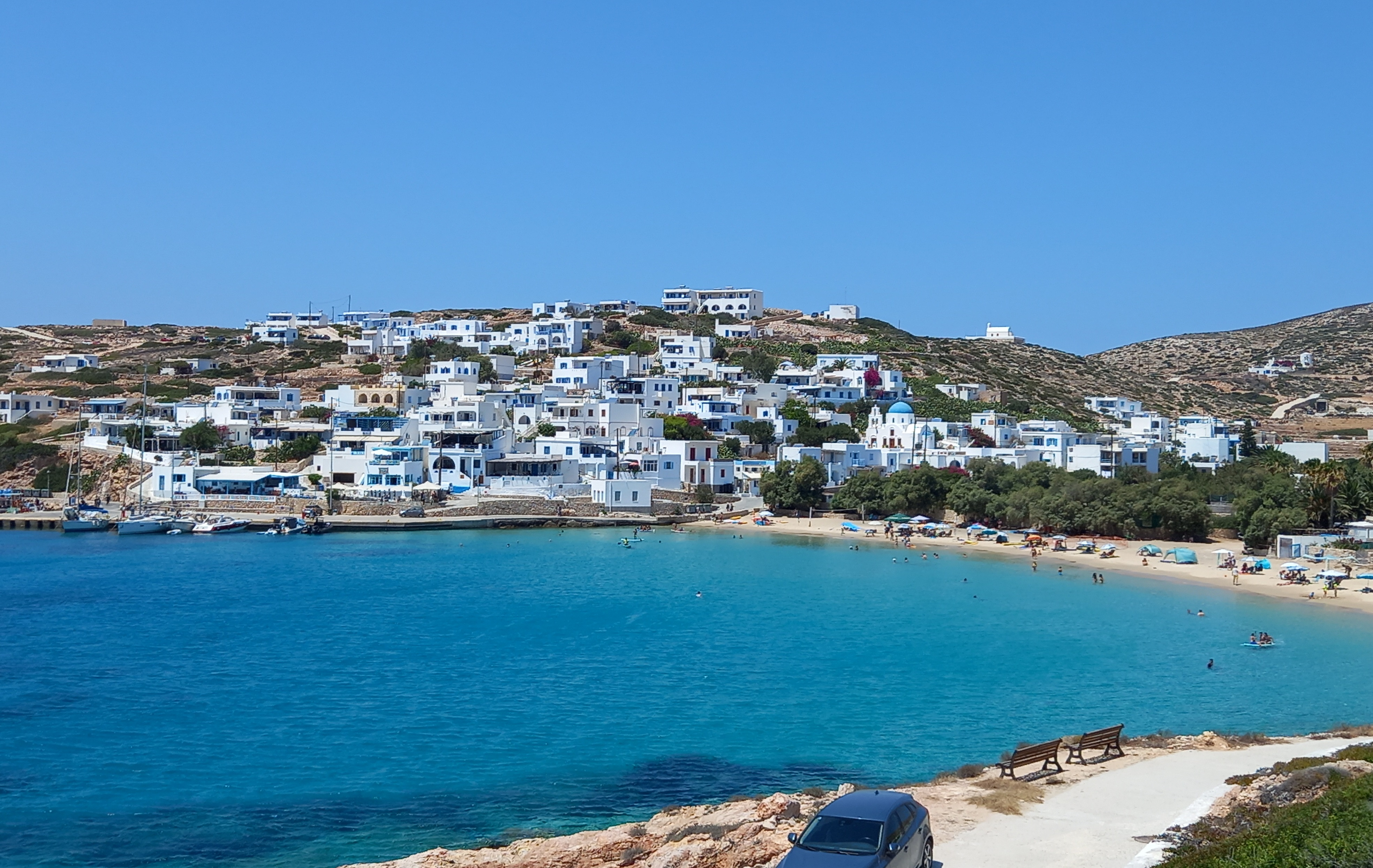
Donousa in 2024.

== Climate ==
According to the station of National Observatory of Athens, Donoussa has a hot semi-arid climate (Köppen climate classification: BSh) with mild winters and hot summers. Donousa has an average annual temperature of around 19.2°C and an average annual precipitation of 260.2 mm (2012-2018).

== History ==
Tracing all the way back to ancient Greek mythology in the prehistoric times, Dionysus, the god of winemaking and wine, took Ariadne from Naxos to hide her from Theseus. There is also evidence of inhabitation on Donousa during the Early Cycladic period, around 3,000 BC.

The island during the Roman times, was additionally considered to be the place where exiles were deported. Later, it became the favourite hideout spot of Mediterranean pirates. Throughout time, the island was ruled by various civilisations including the Venetians and Turks.

Historical population
Year	Pop.	±% p.a.
1928	235	—
1946	250	+0.34%
1981	116	−2.17%
1991	111	−0.44%
2001	163	+3.92%
2011	167	+0.24%
2021	213	+2.46%

== Towns ==
Agios Stavros is the main port and capital of Donoussa. When visiting the Agios Stavros port and town, one will find a variety of taverns, cafes, bakeries, mini markets, rooms for rental and other touristic facilities.

Other towns and villages on the island include Kalotaritissa, Haravgi and Mersini.
