= List of settlements in the Cyclades =

This is a list of settlements in the Cyclades islands, Greece. It is grouped by regional unit.

== Andros ==
- Ammolochos
- Andros (town)
- Ano Gavrio
- Apoikia
- Aprovatou
- Arni
- Batsi
- Fellos
- Gavrio
- Kapparia
- Katakoilos
- Kochylos
- Korthio
- Lamyra
- Makrotantalo
- Mesaria
- Ormos Korthiou
- Palaiokastro
- Palaiopoli
- Pitrofos
- Stenies
- Syneti
- Vitali
- Vourkoti

== Kea-Kythnos ==
- Dryopida
- Ioulis
- Korissia
- Kythnos

== Milos (regional unit) ==
- Adamantas
- Apollonia
- Artemonas
- Kimolos
- Milos
- Pera Triovasalos
- Serifos
- Triovasalos
- Trypiti

== Mykonos ==
- Ano Mera
- Mykonos

== Naxos (regional unit) ==
- Agios Arsenios
- Agios Prokopios
- Aigiali
- Amorgos
- Apeiranthos
- Arkesini
- Chalkeio
- Damarionas
- Danakos
- Donousa
- Engares
- Filoti
- Galanado
- Galini
- Glynado
- Irakleia
- Katapola
- Keramoti
- Kinidaros
- Koronida
- Koronos
- Koufonisia
- Melanes
- Mesi
- Moni
- Naxos (city)
- Potamia
- Sagkri
- Schoinoussa
- Skado
- Tholaria
- Vivlos
- Vroutsis

== Paros (regional unit) ==
- Agkairia
- Antiparos
- Archilochos
- Kostos
- Lefkes
- Marpissa
- Naousa
- Paros

== Syros ==
- Ano Syros
- Chrousa
- Ermoupoli
- Foinikas
- Galissas
- Manna
- Pagos
- Poseidonia
- Vari

== Thira (regional unit) ==
- Akrotiri
- Anafi
- Ano Meria
- Emporeio
- Episkopi Gonias
- Exo Gonia
- Fira
- Folegandros
- Imerovigli
- Ios
- Karterados
- Megalochori
- Mesaria
- Oia
- Perissa
- Pyrgos Kallistis
- Sikinos
- Therasia
- Vothonas
- Vourvoulos

== Tinos ==
- Agapi
- Dyo Choria
- Falatados
- Kalloni
- Kampos
- Kardiani
- Komi
- Ktikados
- Panormos
- Steni
- Tinos (town)
- Triantaros
- Ysternia

== See also ==
- List of towns and villages in Greece
