= 7 Most Endangered Programme =

Programme to protect endangered monuments and sites in Europe

The 7 Most Endangered Programme identifies endangered monuments and sites in Europe and mobilizes public and private partners on a local, national and European level to find a viable future for those sites.

It was launched by Europa Nostra and the European Investment Bank Institute in January 2013.

The 7 Most Endangered Programme is inspired by a successful programme of the US National Trust for Historic Preservation, based in Washington (probably by America's Most Endangered Places). It does not provide funding. Its aim is to serve as a catalyst for action and raise awareness.

Entries can be submitted by Europa Nostra’s country representations, member and associate organisations, as well as by established public and private bodies active in the heritage field located in countries where Europa Nostra is not yet represented.

An international advisory panel, comprising specialists in history, archaeology, architecture, conservation and finance, meet to discuss over the applications and shortlist the most endangered monuments and sites. The board of Europa Nostra reviews the list which is then publicly announced during an annual congress.

Rescue missions to the sites included in the final list are then organised, and the sites are visited. The results and recommendations of the rescue missions are summarised in reports that become available on the organisation's website.

== Lists ==
Year	Site	Location	Country
2013	Roman Amphitheatre in Durrës	Durrës	Albania
2013	The Buffer Zone of the Historic Centre of Nicosia	Nicosia	Cyprus
2013	Vauban’s Fortifications in Briançon	Briançon	France
2013	Renaissance Monastery of San Benedetto Po, near Mantua	San Benedetto Po	Italy
2013	Manueline Style Monastery and Church of Jesus in Setúbal	Setúbal	Portugal
2013	Roşia Montană Mining Landscape in Transylvania	Roşia Montană	Romania
2013	St. George Armenian Church in Mardin	Mardin	Turkey
2014	Historic Stage Machinery of the Bourla Theatre	Antwerp	Belgium
2014	Neighbourhoods of Dolcho and Apozari	Kastoria	Greece
2014	Citadel of Alessandria	Alessandria	Italy
2014	Carillons of the Mafra National Palace	Mafra	Portugal
2014	Wooden Churches in Southern Transylvania and Northern Oltenia	Southern Transylvania and Northern Oltenia	Romania
2014	Colour Row Settlement in Chernyakhovsk	Chernyakhovsk	Russia
2014	Synagogue in Subotica	Subotica	Serbia
2016	Archaeological Site of Ererouyk and village of Ani Pemza	Ani Pemza	Armenia
2016	Patarei Sea Fortress in Tallinn	Tallinn	Estonia
2016	Helsinki-Malmi Airport	Helsinki	Finland
2016	Colbert Swing Bridge in Dieppe	Dieppe, Normandy	France
2016	Kampos of Chios, island of Chios	Chios	Greece
2016	Convent of St. Anthony of Padua Extremadura	Cáceres	Spain
2016	Ancient city of Hasankeyf and its surroundings	Hasankeyf	Turkey
2016	Venice Lagoon	Venice	Italy
2018	Post-Byzantine Churches in Voskopoja and Vithkuqi	Voskopoja, Vithkuqi	Albania
2018	Historic Centre of Vienna	Vienna	Austria
2018	The Buzludzha Monument	Buzludzha	Bulgaria
2018	David Gareji Monasteries and Hermitage	Sagarejo Municipality, Kakheti	Georgia
2018	Constanța Casino	Constanța	Romania
2018	Prinkipo Greek Orthodox Orphanage	Princes' Islands	Turkey
2018	Grimsby Ice Factory	Grimsby	United Kingdom
2020	National Theatre of Albania in Tirana	Tirana	Albania
2020	Jezeří Castle in Horní Jiřetín	Horní Jiřetín	Czech Republic
2020	Castle of Sammezzano in Leccio	Tuscany	Italy
2020	Y-block building of the Government Quarter in Oslo	Oslo	Norway
2020	Szombierki Power Plant in Bytom	Bytom	Poland
2020	Belgrade Fortress and its surroundings	Belgrade	Serbia
2020	Bežigrad Stadium of the architect Jože Plečnik in Ljubljana	Ljubljana	Slovenia
2021	Achensee Steam Cog Railway	Tyrol	Austria
2021	Historic Cemetery Complex of Mirogoj	Zagreb	Croatia
2021	Five Southern Aegean Islands	Aegean Islands	Greece
2021	The Giusti Garden	Verona	Italy
2021	Dečani Monastery	Metohija	Kosovo
2021	Central Post Office of Skopje	Skopje	North Macedonia
2021	San Juan de Socueva Chapel and Hermitage	Cantabria	Spain
2022	Zogu Bridge	Milot	Albania
2022	Récollets Convent	Nivelles	Belgium
2022	Garden City La Butte Rouge	Châtenay-Malabry	France
2022	Historic Centre of Stolberg	Stolberg	Germany
2022	Neptune Baths	Băile Herculane	Romania
2022	Orléans-Borbón Palace	Cádiz	Spain
2022	Crèvecoeur Fortress	Den Bosch	The Netherlands
2023	Kortrijk Railway Station	Kortrijk	Belgium
2023	Partisan Memorial Cemetery	Mostar	Bosnia and Herzegovina
2023	Tchakvinji Fortress	Zugdidi	Georgia
2023	Sisters’ House Ensemble (former Moravian settlement)	Kleinwelka	Germany
2023	Memento Park	Budapest	Hungary
2023	Cultural Landscape of Sveti Stefan	Paštrovići	Montenegro
2023	Watermills of Bistrica	Petrovac na Mlavi	Serbia
2024	Working-class Housing	Roubaix-Tourcoing	France
2024	Cycladic Islands, notably Sifnos, Serifos and Folegandros	Cycladic Islands	Greece
2024	Church of San Pietro in Gessate	Milan	Italy
2024	Synagogue of Siena	Siena	Italy
2024	Home of the Yugoslav People’s Army	Šabac	Serbia
2024	Greek Orthodox Church of St. Georgios	Altınözü	Turkey
2024	Iron Gate of Antioch	Antakya	Turkey
2025	Arakelots Monastery and Settlement	Kirants, Tavush Province	Armenia
2025	Nyborg Castle	Funen	Denmark
2025	Castle of Monemvasia	Laconia	Greece
2025	Great Synagogue in Orla	Orla, Bielsk country	Poland
2025	Generalštab Modernist Complex in Belgrade	Belgrade	Serbia
2025	Valhalla Swimming Hall	Gothenburg	Sweden
2025	Victoria Tower Gardens	London	United Kingdom
2026	Katapola Village and Ancient City of Minoa	Minoa, Amorgos	Greece
2026	Fábri Watermill	Feked	Hungary
2026	Blower Hall	Esch-sur-Alzette	Luxembourg
2026	British Barracks at Fort Chambray	Gozo	Malta
2026	Vale de Milhaços Gunpowder Factory	Seixal	Portugal
2026	Reformed Church of Sântămăria Orlea	Sântămăria Orlea	Romania
2026	Weifert’s Brewery	Pančevo	Serbia
