= Asfondilitis =

Village in Greece

Coordinates: 36°52′15″N 25°57′00″E

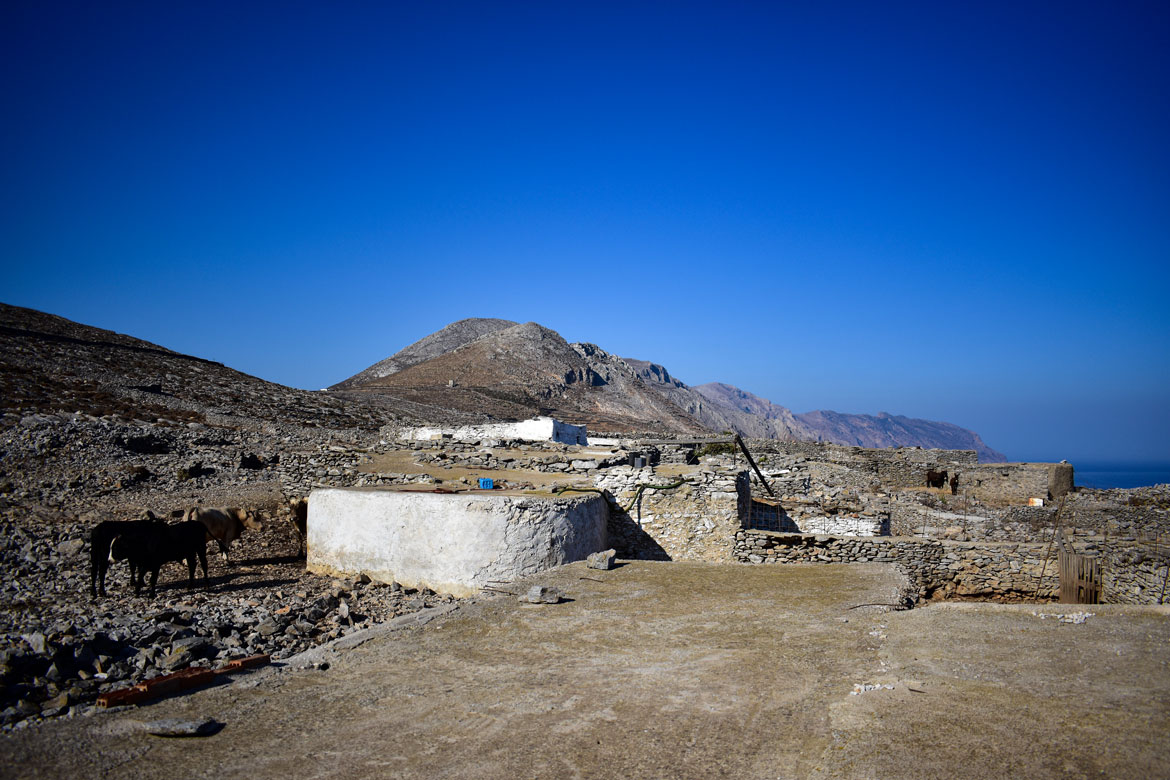
The village of Asfondilitis in Amorgos

Asfondilitis (Greek: Ασφοντυλίτης) is an abandoned ancient village in the Greek island of Amorgos. The settlement is in the middle of Megali Strata, an old path connecting Aegiali to Chora.

Before World War II the village used to be an important agriculture place on Amorgos. Asfondilitis offers a view on the south part of Amorgos and the Aegean Sea.

== The rock paintings ==
The village is also known for its stone paintings, made by a disabled person, Michalis Roussos, between 1897 and 1943.

Michalis enjoyed painting dancers, festivals and musicians. However, his favorite theme was women. The name "Dafnoula" is carved in numerous stones around the village. He also carved crosses, single or in sets of three. They were meant to protect the village from evil.
