= Aegiale =

Aegiale may refer to:

- Aegiale (Amorgos), an ancient town of Amorgos
- Aegiale (wife of Diomedes), a daughter of Adrastus and Amphithea, or of Aegialeus the son of Adrastus, in Greek mythology
- Aegiale (mother of Alcyone), the mother of Alcyone by Aeolus in Greek mythology according to Hyginus
- Aegiale (butterfly), a genus of skipper butterflies
