= Arcesine =

Ancient town on the island of Amorgos

Coordinates: 36°48′35″N 25°49′03″E

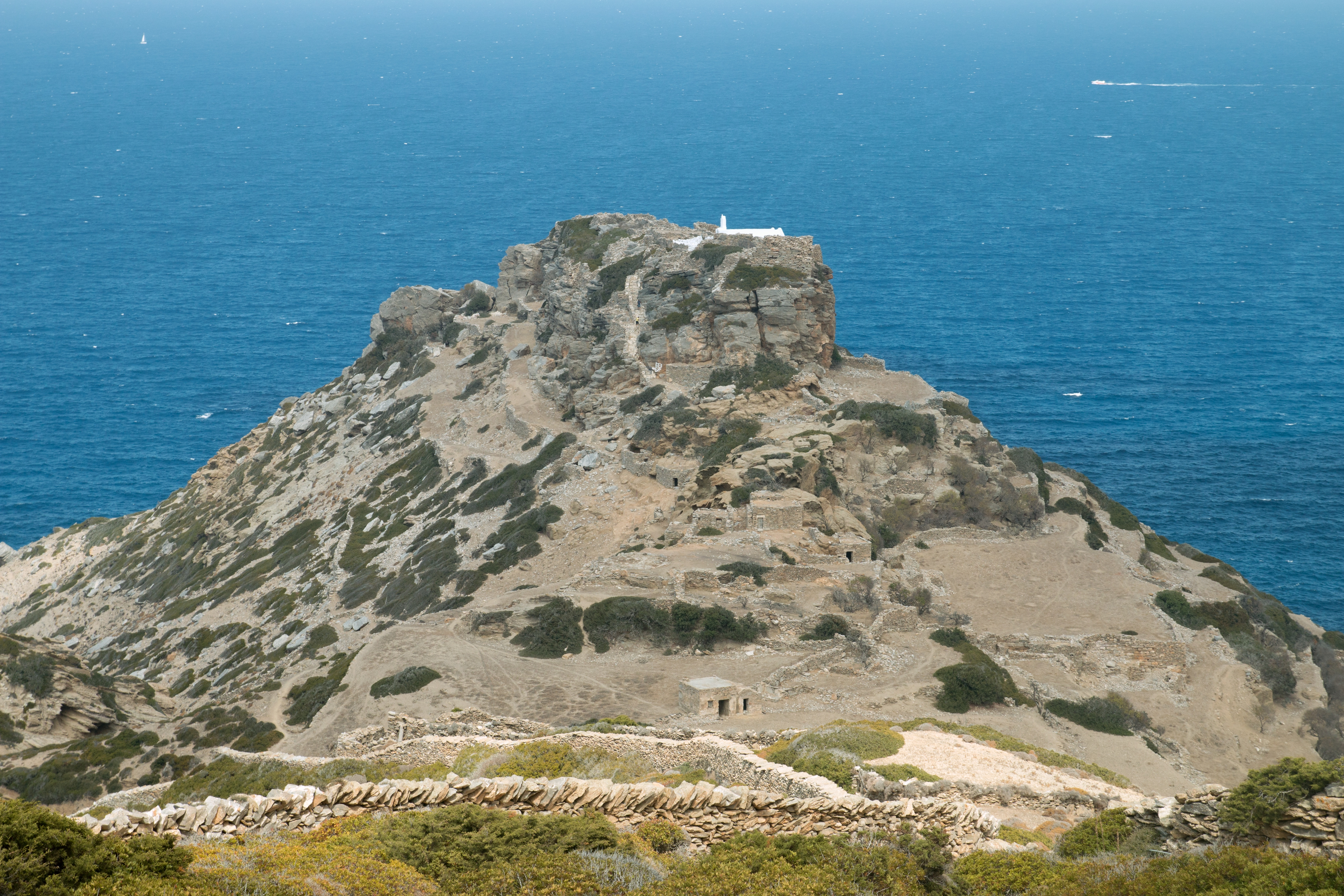
The acropolis of ancient Arkesine (Kastri)

Arcesine or Arkesine (Ancient Greek: Ἀρκεσίνη) was an ancient town on the island of Amorgos in the eastern Cyclades. It was one of the three main settlements on the island in antiquity.

== Location ==
The site of ancient Arkesine was identified in the 19th century from the large number of inscriptions found there. It was situated on the northern coast of Amorgos, not far from the southwestern end of the island, at a place known as Kastri, ca. 1.5 km north of the modern village of Vroutsi. The most conspicuous topographical feature of the site is a steep rocky promontory overlooking the sea, on which the acropolis of the ancient town was located. Substantial remains of the ancient circuit wall of the acropolis survive.

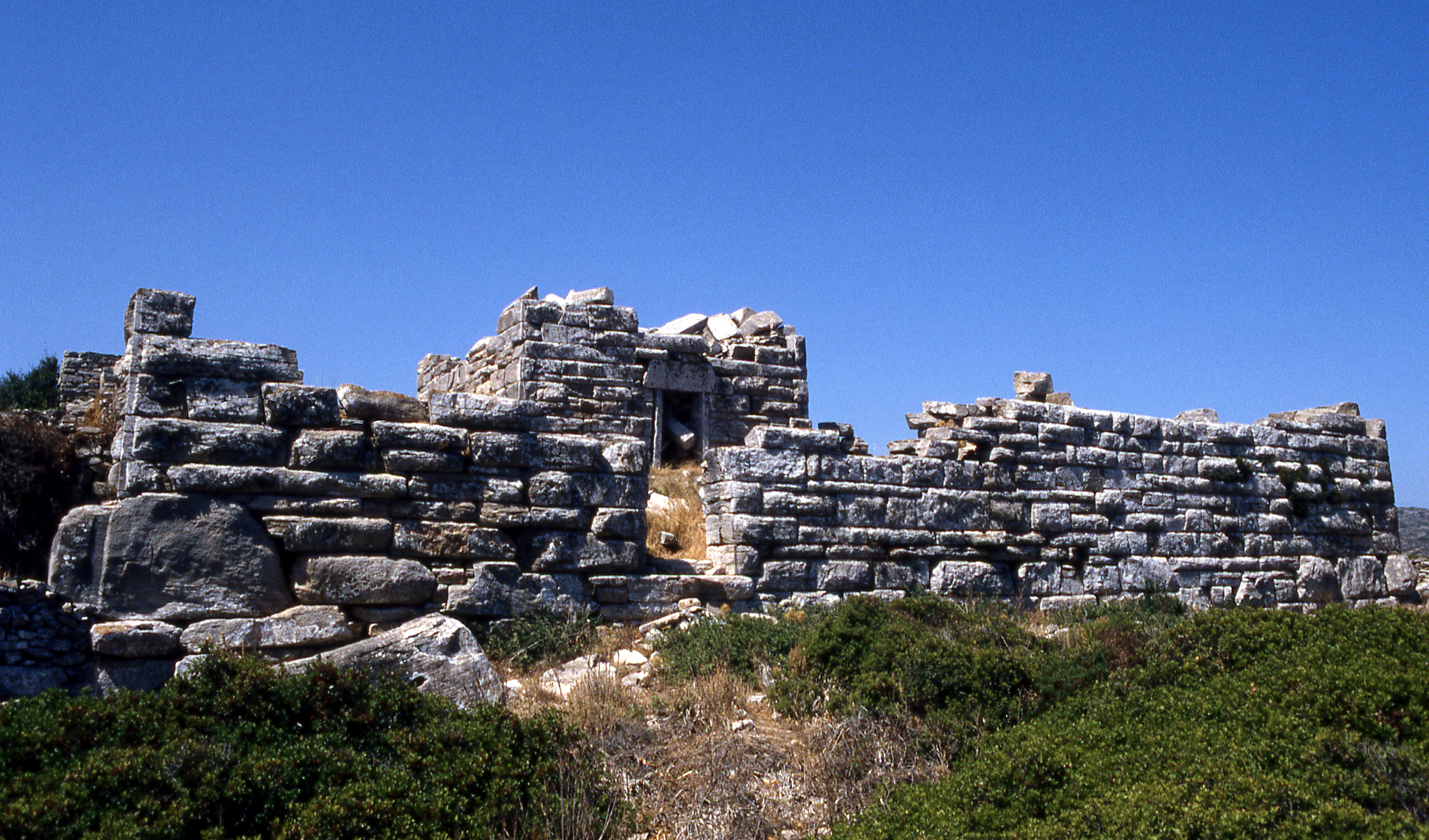
Hellenistic tower at Ayia Triada, near the modern village of Arkesine

Ancient Arkesine should not be confused with the modern village of the same name, which lies further inland, several kilometers to the southwest. At Sto Chorio near the chapel of Agia Triada, just north of the modern village, stands a small but well-preserved fort of late Classical or early Hellenistic date, consisting of a rectangular tower with a fortified enclosure.
