= Partisan cemetery in Livno =

Cemetery in Bosnia and Herzegovina

- Partizansko groblje u Livnu
- Bosnia and Herzegovina
- For the Yugoslav Partisans of Livno
- Unveiled: 1972
- Location: 43°49′46″N 16°59′53″E near Livno, Bosnia and Herzegovina
- Designed by: Vinko Kragic and Frano Buskareli
- Total burials: 171

Partisans' Memorial Cemetery in Livno was built in 1972 to honor the Yugoslav Partisans of Livno who were killed in the National Liberation Front. It is one of the largest partisan cemeteries in Bosnia and Herzegovina. It contains the remains of 171 unidentified partisans as well as the remains of all the partisans killed in the area. The names of the known partisans are carved into the four sides.

During and after the war from 1992 to 1995 it was repeatedly attacked in an attempt to destroy it. During the war it was dynamited twice, but the structure withstood the explosion. It is often defaced by graffiti.

The Social Democratic Party of Bosnia and Herzegovina organizes a yearly mowing and weeding of the area to help preserve the memorial.

== See also ==
- Vraca Memorial Park is located in Sarajevo, Bosnia and Herzegovina.
- Partisan Memorial Cemetery in Mostar is located in Mostar, Bosnia and Herzegovina.
