= Ormos Egialis =

Port of Amorgos

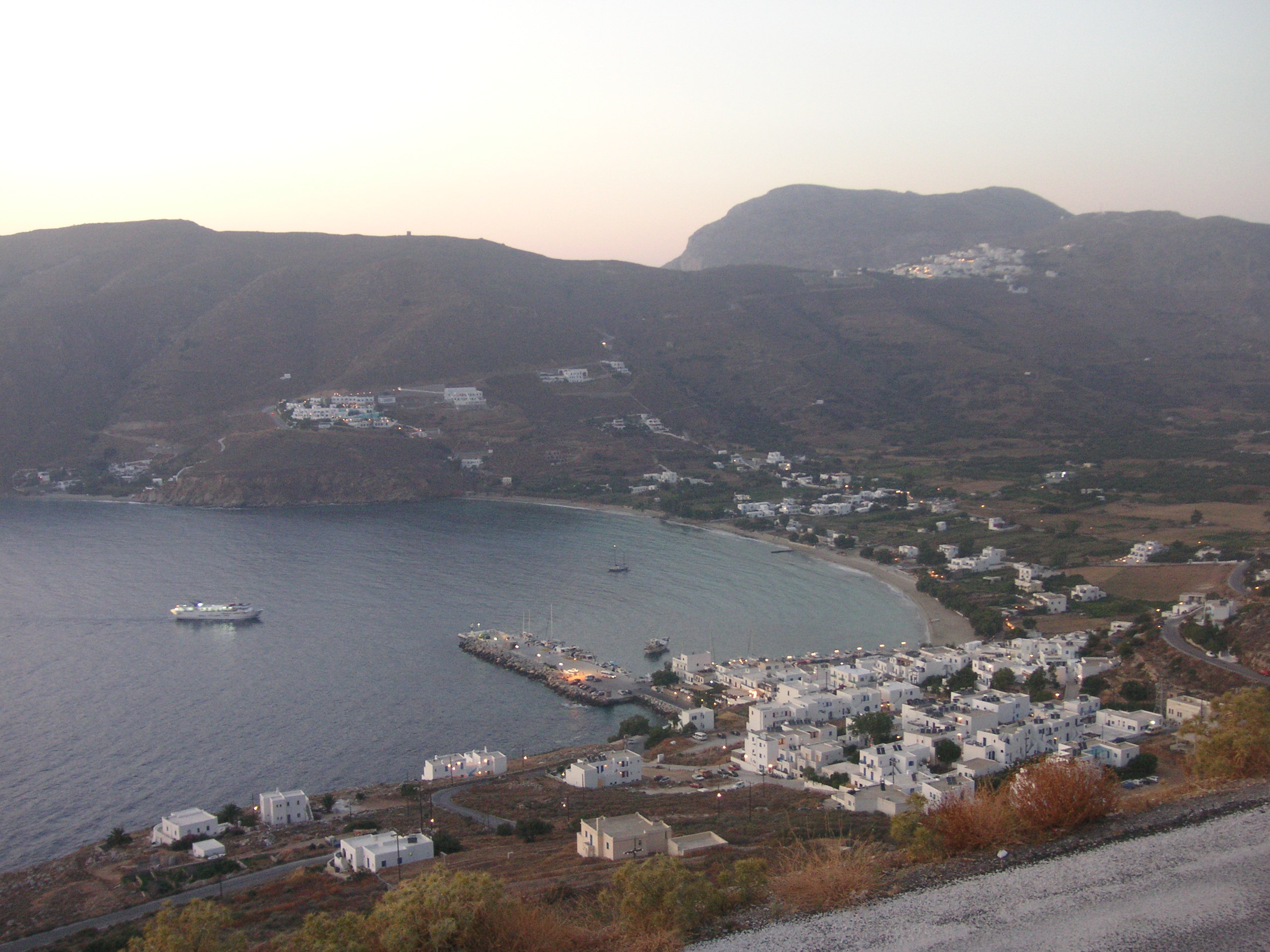
Aegiali at sunset

Ormos Egialis (Greek: Όρμος Αιγιάλης, pronounced [ˌormos eˈʝalis]) is also called Aegiali (Greek: Αιγιάλη, [eˈjali]) and is the second port of Amorgos. It is set in a large sweeping bay, providing a view from Tholaria and the Aegialis Hotel above. There are frequent ferries to and from Piraeus, as well as a daily ferry to Naxos.
