= Markiani =

Bronze Age fortified settlement in Amorgos, Greece

Coordinates: 36.8001°N 25.7882°E

Markiani (Greek: Μαρκιανή) is a Bronze Age fortified settlement built on top of a hill in the island of Amorgos in Greece.

Signs of early Cycladic habitation at Markiani span a period of ten centuries, dating from the Grotta-Pelos culture to the Kastri culture phases (ca. 3200-2200 BC). The site has also been inhabited at latter times during the Hellenistic and Roman periods.

== See also ==
- History of the Cyclades
- Cycladic art
