= Minoa (Amorgos) =

Ancient town on the island of Amorgos

Coordinates: 36°49′16″N 25°51′40″E

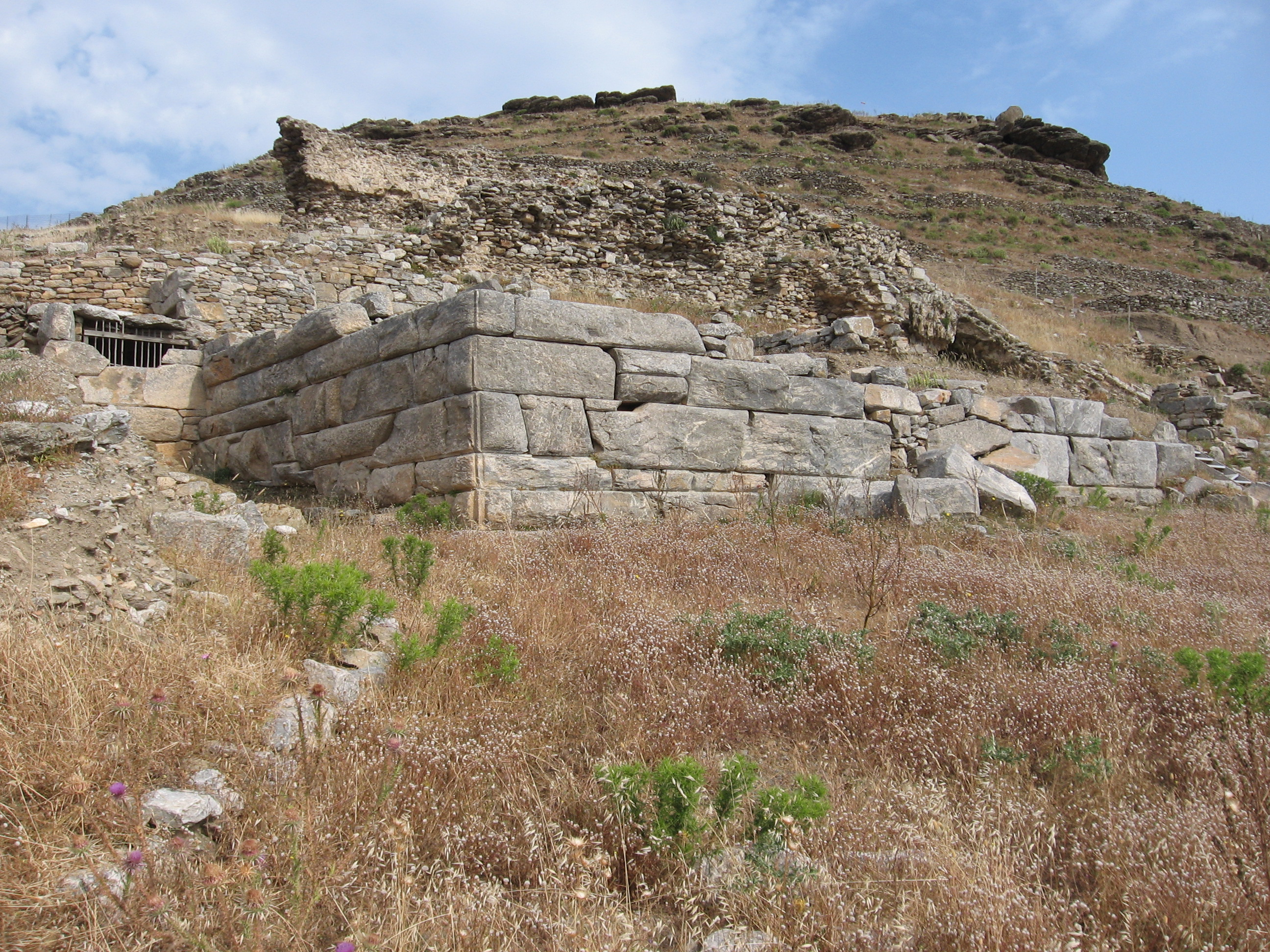
Ruins of the walls of Minoa.

Minoa (Ancient Greek: Μινῴα, Μίνωα, or Μινυΐα) was an ancient town on the island of Amorgos. It was the birthplace of Simonides of Amorgos.

The site of Minoa is located near modern Katapola, on Moundoulia Hill.
