= Vraca Memorial Park =

Memorial park in Sarajevo, Bosnia and Herzegovina

Coordinates: 43.8435°N 18.3981°E

- Bosnia and Herzegovina
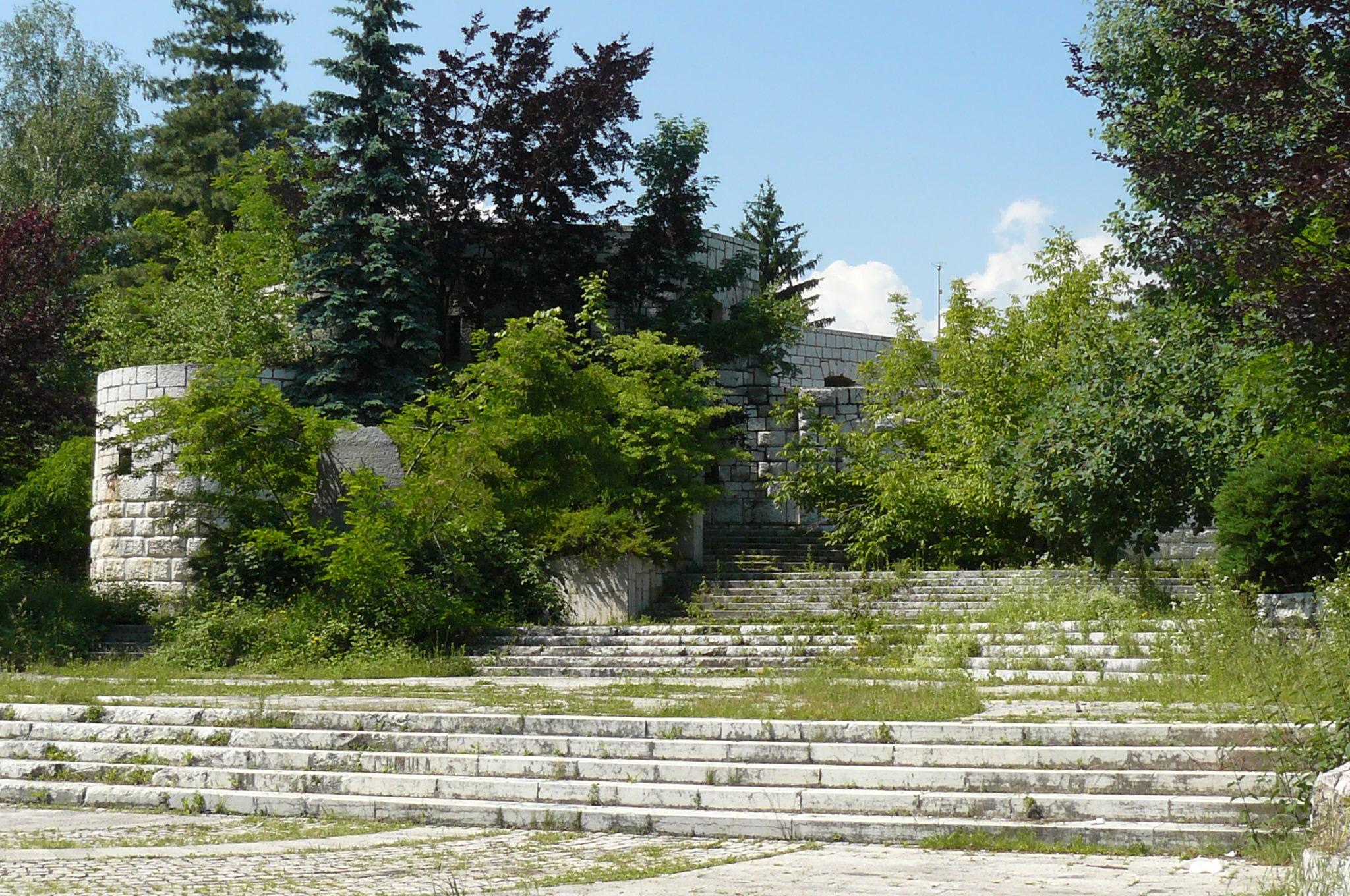
- For the dead of World War II
- Unveiled: 25 November 1981
- Location: near Sarajevo, Bosnia and Herzegovina
- Designed by: Vladimir Dobrović

The Vraca Memorial Park (Serbo-Croatian: Spomen-park Vraca / Спомен-парк Враца) is a park dedicated to the World War II victims in Sarajevo, Bosnia and Herzegovina. It covers 78,000 square meters and mentions the names of over 11,000 men, women, and children killed during World War II.

== History ==
The idea was to rehabilitate an old Austro-Hungarian fortress by combining the work of Vladimir Dobrović as designer, Alija Kučukalić as sculptor, and Aleksandar Maltarić as landscaper. Construction began in April 1980 and was finished in November 1981. The Memorial Park was opened on November 25, 1981, the "Day of Statehood of Bosnia and Herzegovina" in SR Bosnia & Herzegovina commemorationg the date that ZAVNOBIH held their first meeting in 1943.

In 1996, the park was systematically destroyed by withdrawing VRS forces after the signing of the Dayton Agreement.

In 2005, the park was declared a National Monument .

On 16 May 2019, the park was renovated, where night lighting was connected for the first time, and the eternal flame was kindled after 27 years.

== See also ==
- List of National Monuments of Bosnia and Herzegovina
- Partisan cemetery in Livno is located in Livno, Bosnia and Herzegovina.
- Partisan Memorial Cemetery in Mostar is located in Mostar, Bosnia and Herzegovina.
