= Kalotaritissa =

Beach in Amorgos, Greece

Coordinates: 36.7931°N 25.7432°E

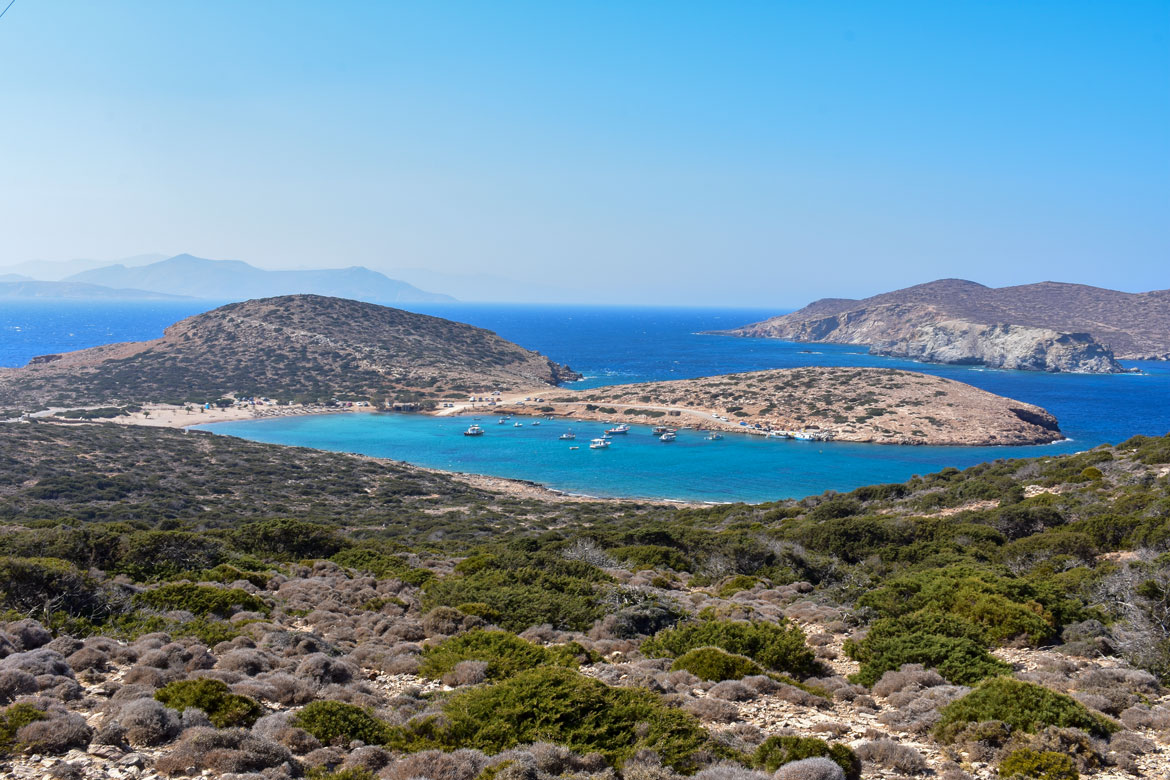
The natural bay where Kalotaritissa beach (far left) is located

Kalotaritissa Beach (Greek: Καλοταρίτισσα) is a sandy beach in the Greek island of Amorgos, accessible by car or public transport. The beach is sandy without tourist amenities except one small beach café and sunbeds for rent.

The natural bay where the beach is located in, is protected from winds and waves.

== Boat trip to Gramvousa ==
From Kalotaritissa beach one can take a boat ride to the nearby island of Gramvousa, departing every 30 mins or 1 hour during peak season.
