= Mesi, Naxos =

Mesi Μέση
- Community
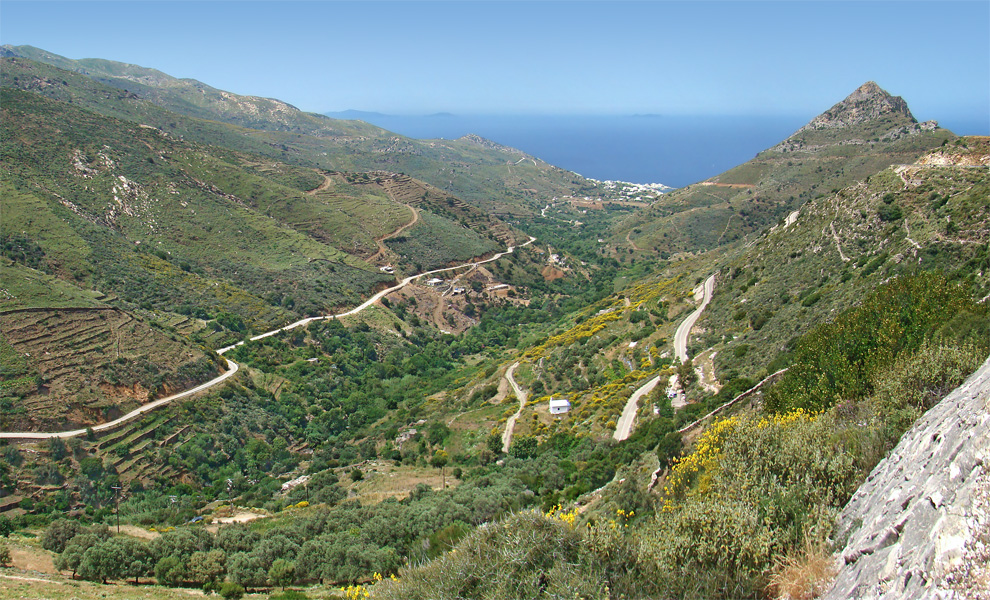
- Landscape around Mesi

- Location within Greece
- Coordinates: 37°9′40″N 25°33′43″E
- Country: Greece
- Administrative region: South Aegean
- Regional unit: Naxos
- Municipality: Drymalia

Population (2021)
  - Community: 93
- Time zone: UTC+2 (EET)
  - Summer (DST): UTC+3 (EEST)

Mesi (Greek: Μέση) is a mountain village on the island Naxos, Greece. It is part of the municipal unit Drymalia.

Its name is probably due to its location in the middle between Komiaki and the northeastern coast of Naxos. Until 1950 Mesi depended on the community of Skado. In 1955 it had roughly 180 residents. At the 2021 census it numbered 93 residents.
