= Partisan Memorial Cemetery in Mostar =

Memorial cemetery in Bosnia and Herzegovina

- Bosnia and Herzegovina
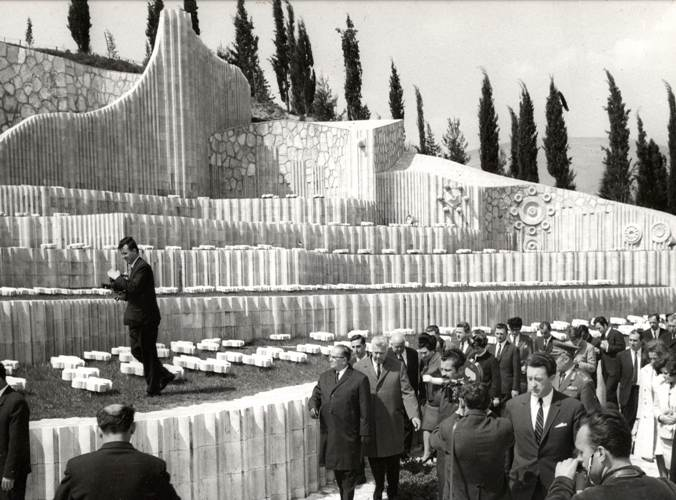
- Tito visiting Partisan Memorial Cemetery in 1969.
- For the Yugoslav Partisans of Mostar
- Unveiled: 25 September 1965; 9 May 2005
- Location: 43°20′29″N 17°47′47″E; Mostar, Bosnia and Herzegovina
- Designed by: Bogdan Bogdanović
- Total burials: 810
- Unknowns: 92
- Website: partizansko.info

KONS of Bosnia and Herzegovina
- Official name: Partisan Memorial-Cemetery, the architectural ensemble
- Type: Category I cultural heritage
- Criteria: B; C iv; D iii; E v; F i, ii; G i, ii, iii, v, vi; H ii, iii; I i, ii, iii.
- Designated: 21 January 2006 (session; 07/1-2-924/03-4)
- Reference no.: 2778
- State: National Monuments of Bosnia and Herzegovina

The Partisan Memorial Cemetery in Mostar is located in Mostar, Bosnia and Herzegovina. It was built in 1965 in honor of the Yugoslav Partisans of Mostar who were killed during World War II in Yugoslavia. It's located on Bijeli Brijeg and displays all the features of a complex architectural, aesthetic and landscape design. It is a unique monument in the urban scale of the city of Mostar, and is of particular ambient value.

== History ==
The Partisan Memorial Cemetery in Mostar is constructed on the locality called Bijeli Brijeg, on the slopes of Hum hill on the right bank of the Neretva river, in Mostar.

At the initiative of Džemal Bijedić, the Belgrade architect Bogdan Bogdanović was put in charge of the design. The Municipal Assembly passed the decision in 1960 and was carried out by Mostar's Parks and Plantations Corporation. Preparation for the cemetery began in October 1960 and work started on 1 December 1960. Ahmet Ribica, a civil engineer, was in charge of drilling and dynamiting works on the hill and constructing the monument. On 25 September 1965, the 20th anniversary of the liberation of Mostar and the formation of the Mostar Battalion, it was opened by Josip Broz Tito.

Total burials is 810, however, as of 2024 a number of identified and registered by Partisan Memorial Cemetery in Mostar website is 718.

In 1992, the cemetery was badly damaged by war and dynamiting. After the war, the cemetery deteriorated due to severe neglect, vandalism and devastation.

On 31 January 2003, a committee composed of Bogdan Bogdanović, Boris Podreka, Amir Pašić, Darko Minarik, Ekrem Krpo, Zdravko Gutić, Tihomir Rozić, Alija Bijavica, Milica Dogan, Florijan Mičković, Milivoj Gagro, Radmilo Andrić, Mumin Isić and Mustafa Selimović was created in support of renovating the cemetery. By the end of 2004 an operational programme of measures was created.

In 2005, works were fixed and various parts of the complex and greenery were reconstructed. On 9 May 2005, the cemetery was formally opened.

In 2006, the cemetery was proclaimed a national monument of Bosnia and Herzegovina. Since then however, the cemetery has once again fallen victim to neglect, heavy vandalism and rubbish dumping. In early 2022, more nationalist graffiti appeared at the cemetery entrance, including swastikas, Ustaše "U"s, and slurs against Bosniaks. On 14 June 2022, most of 700 tombstones were smashed by vandals. In the following week informal groups and individuals started leaving flowers and recovering pieces in symbolic manner.

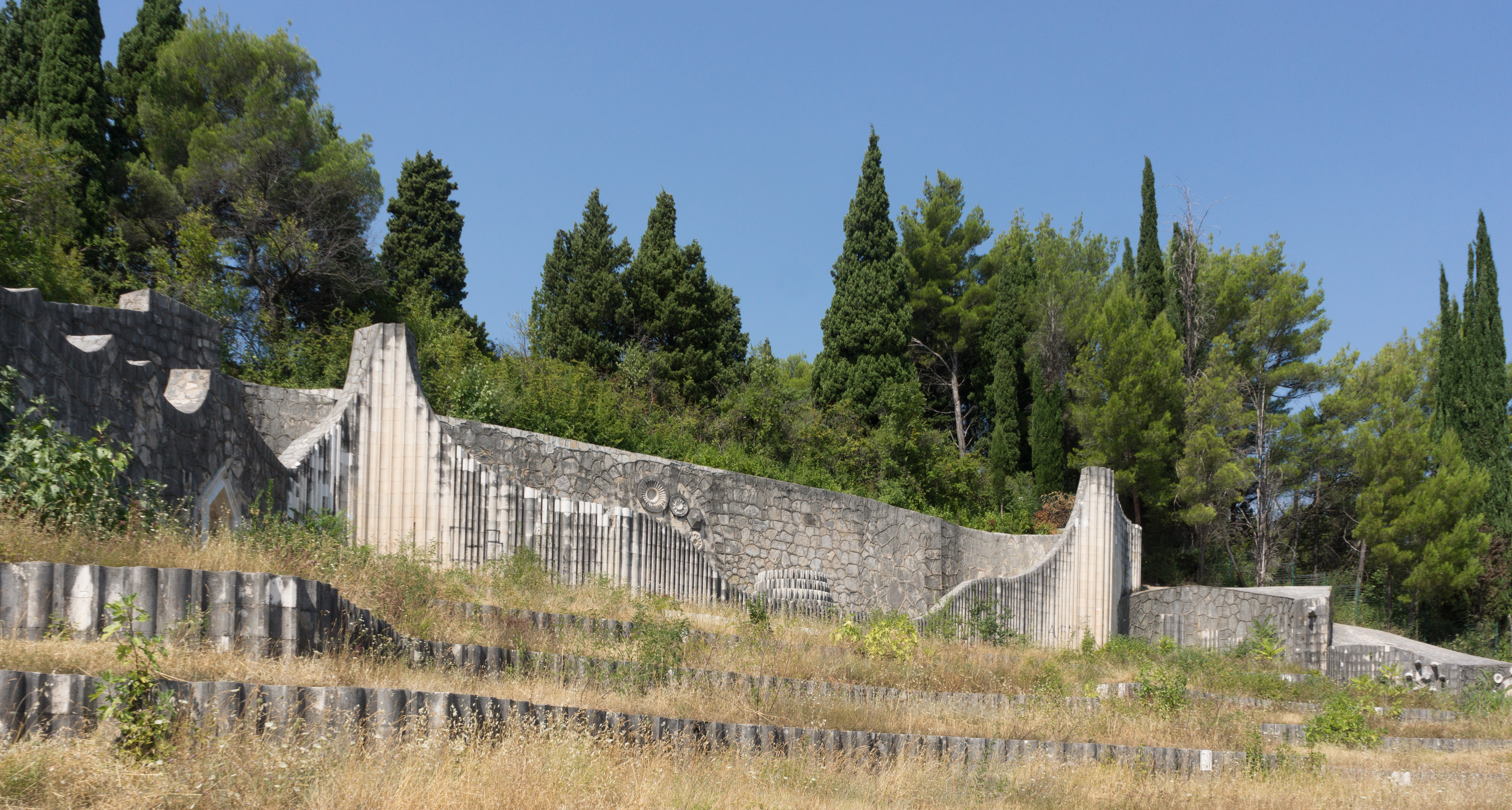
View of an abandoned monument

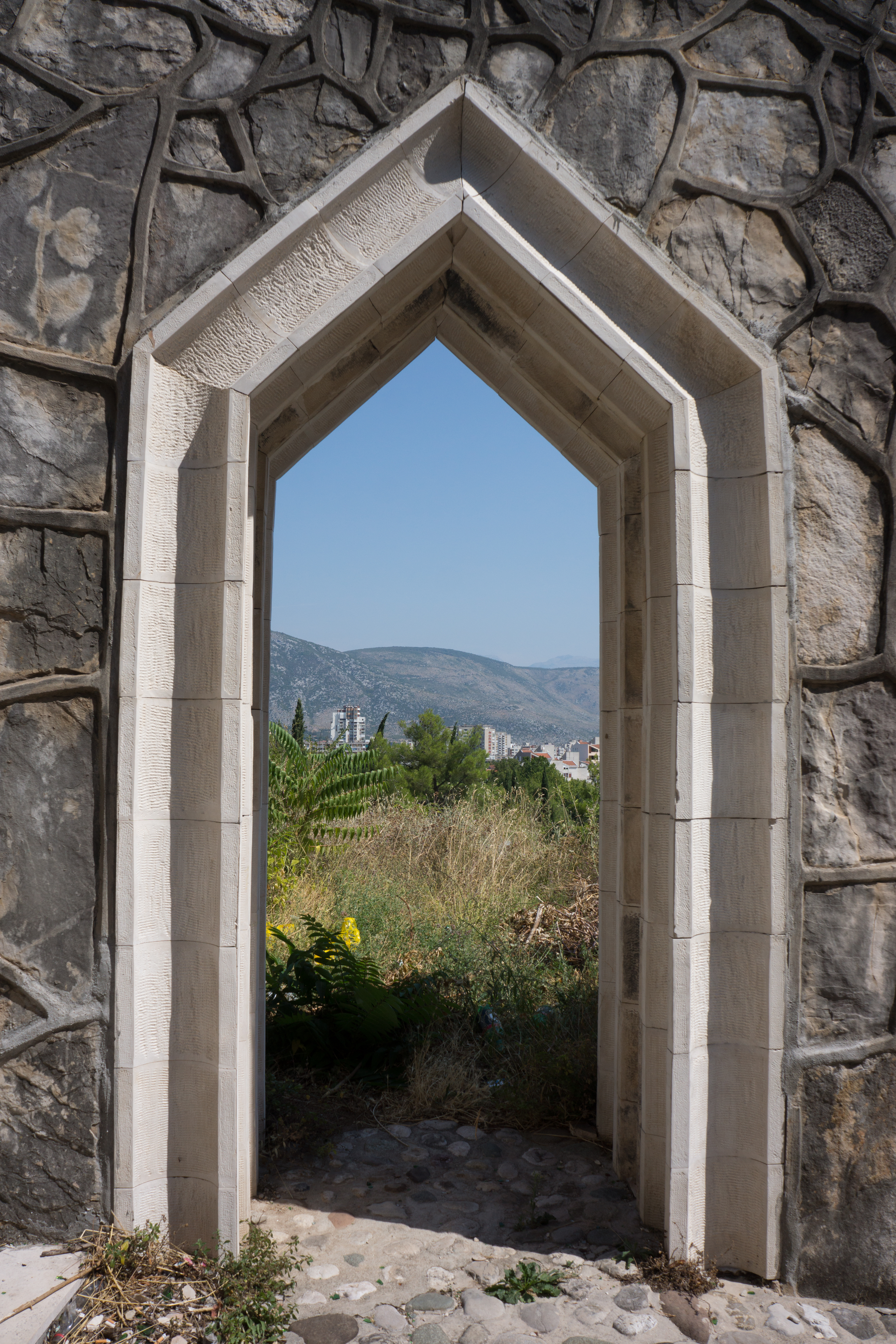
Entrance to the upper, sixth terrace

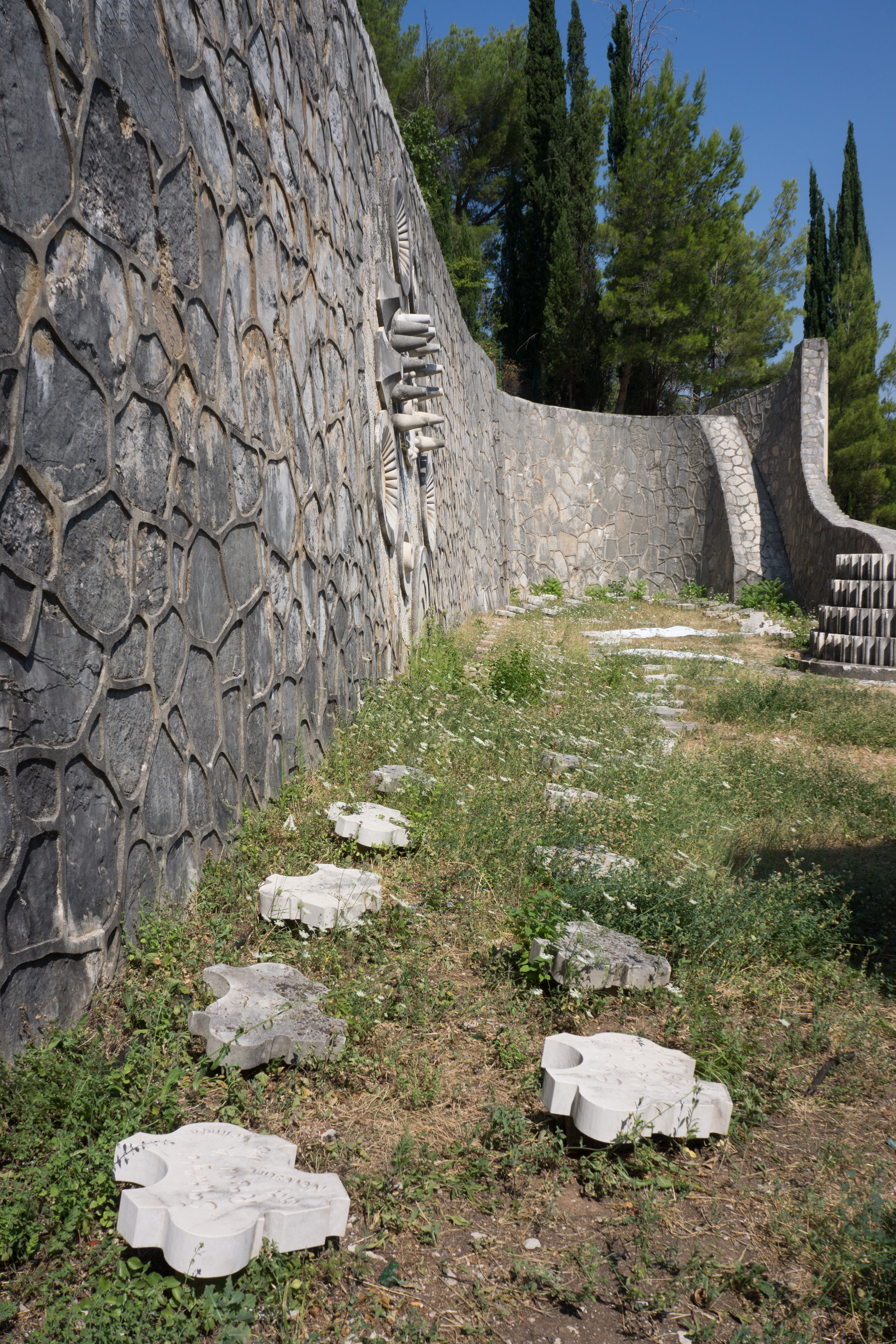
Upper terrace overlooking the sundial and the jagged fountain

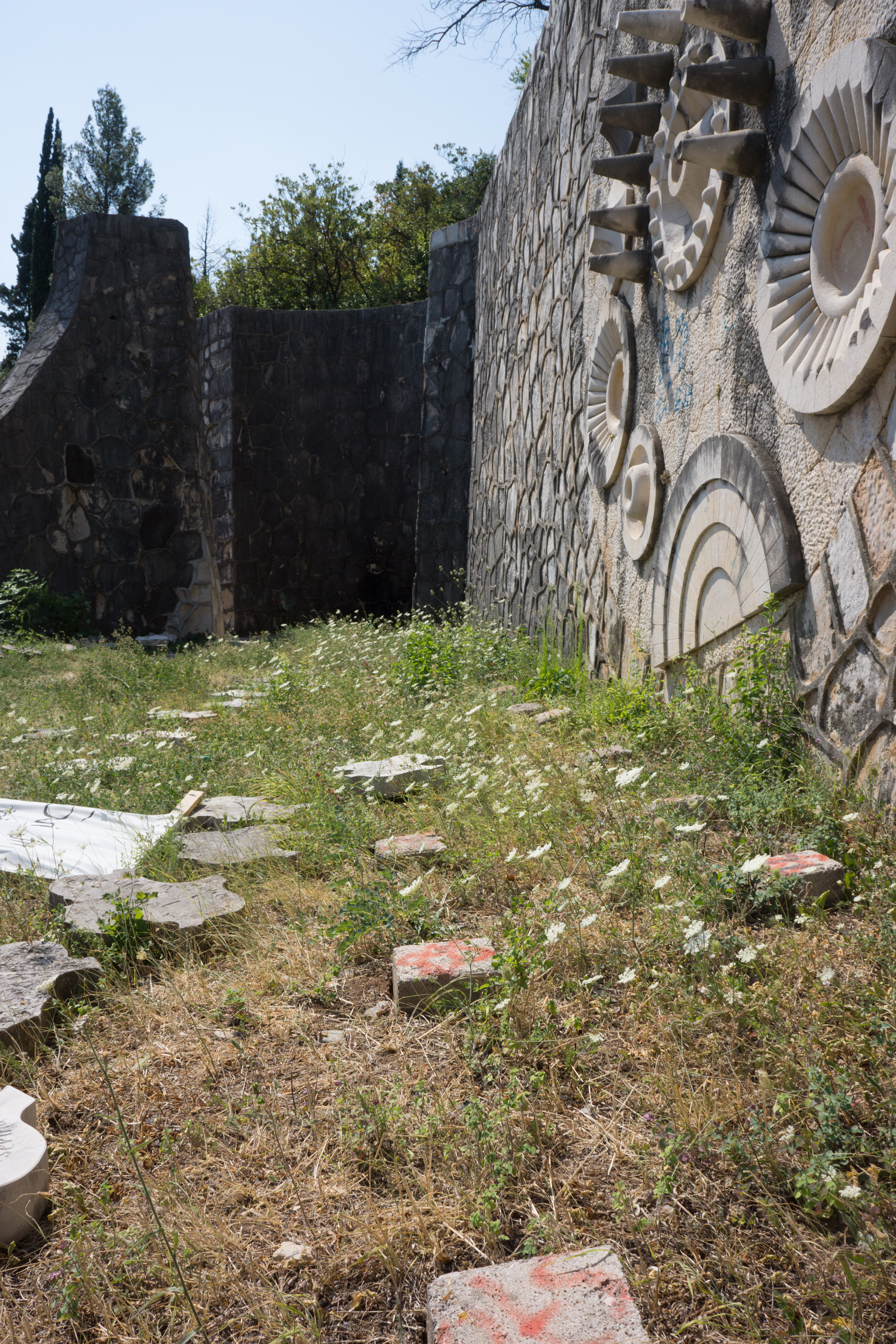
Cosmological sundial

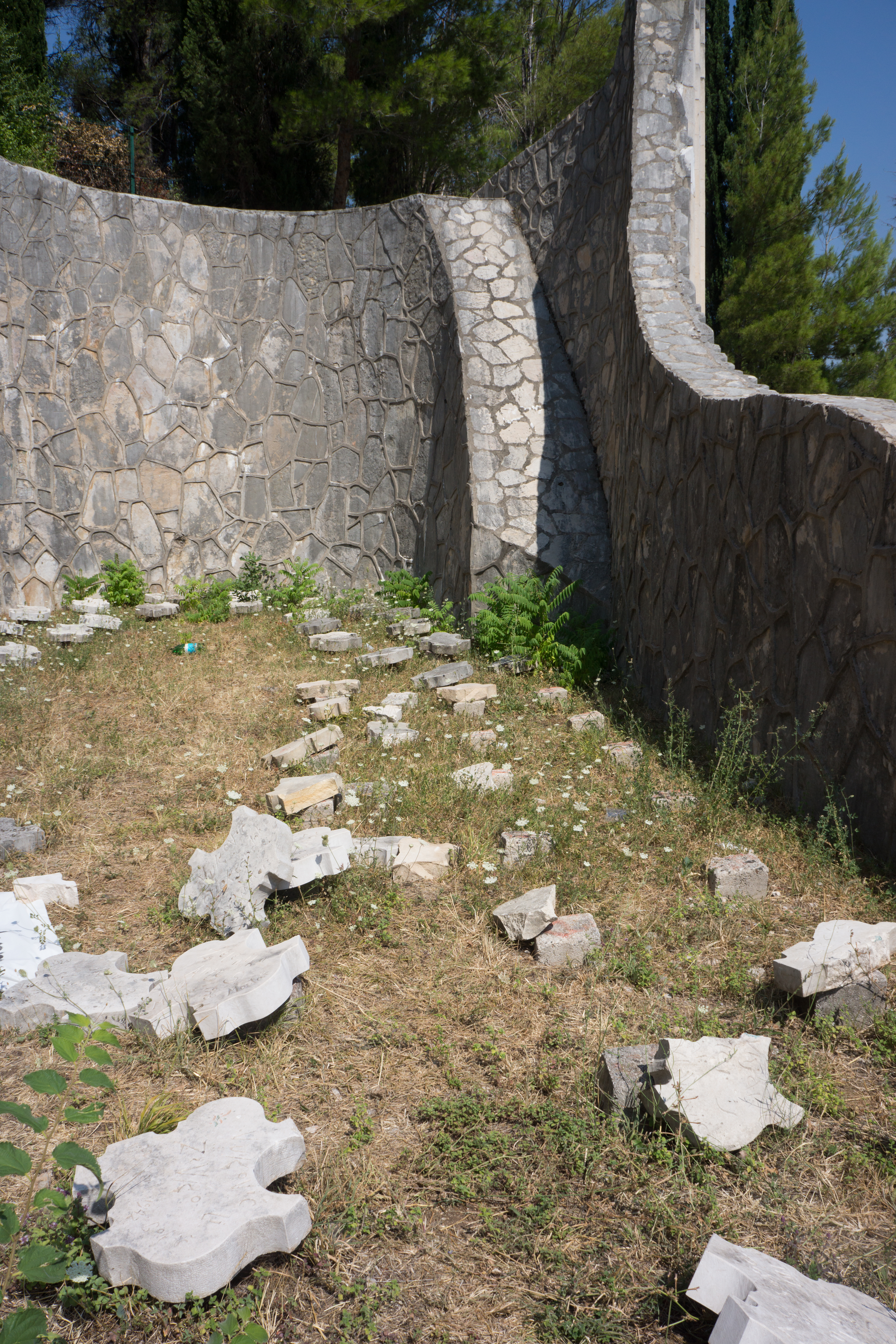
Abandoned terrace with devastated tombstones

== Heritage ==
The Partisan Memorial Cemetery in Mostar features a complex architectural and landscape aesthetics. It is a unique monument in the urban scale of the city of Mostar and is of particular ambient value. Besides, the complex is also an important heritage site, and as such is inscribed on the List of National Monuments of Bosnia and Herzegovina by KONS.

== See also ==
- Vraca Memorial Park is located in Sarajevo, Bosnia and Herzegovina.
- Partisan cemetery in Livno is located in Livno, Bosnia and Herzegovina.
