= Perissa, Santorini =

Village in Greece

Coordinates: 36°21′25″N 25°28′25″E

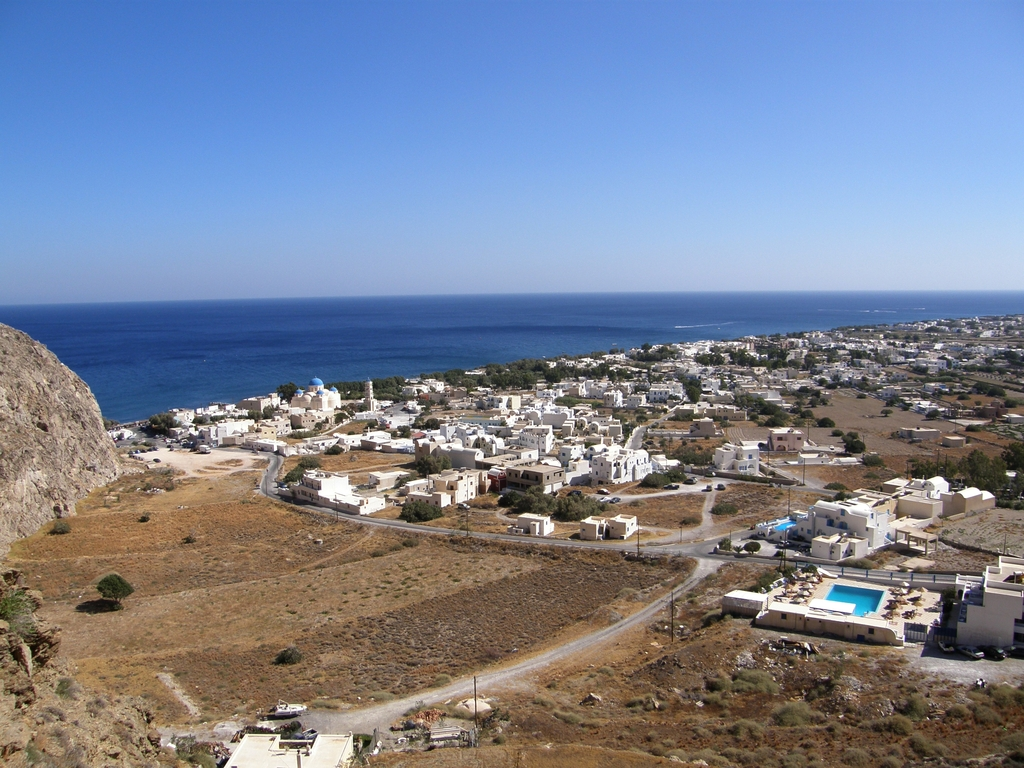
View of Perissa.

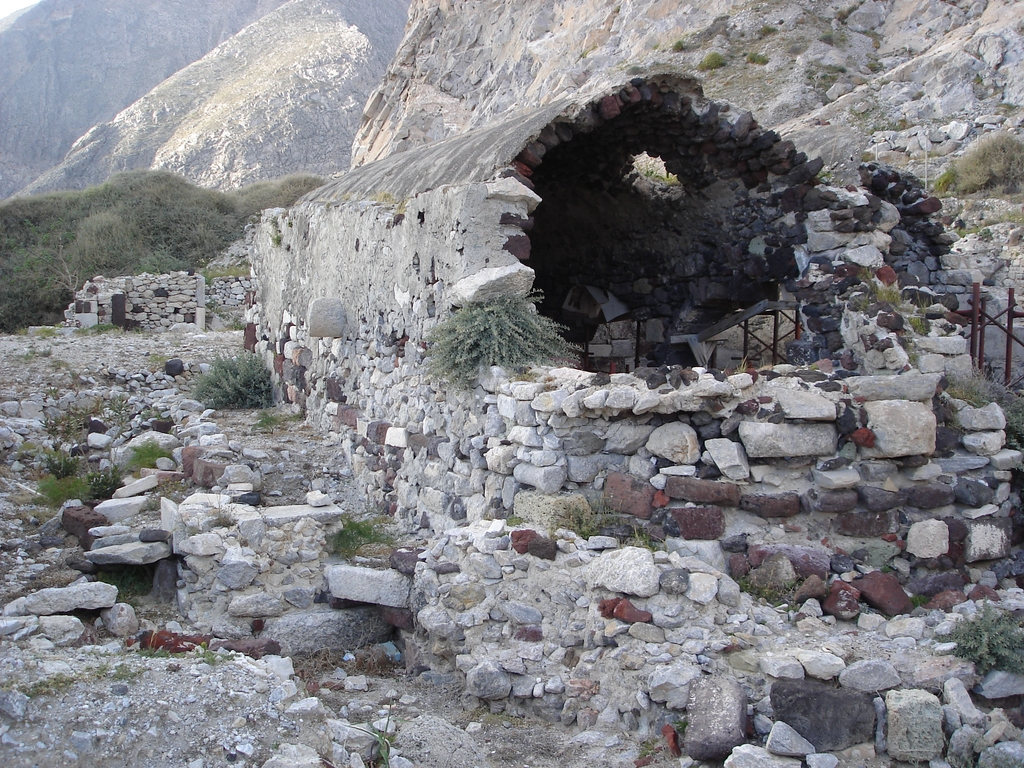
The ancient basilica of St. Irene.

Perissa (Greek: Περίσσα) is a village on the island of Santorini, Greece. It is located 13 km to the southeast of Fira, near the Messa Vouno rock.

According to the 2021 census, Perissa has 725 permanent inhabitants. It is part of the community of Emporio.

Perissa boasts magnificent beaches on the Aegean including Perissa Beach itself. There are the remnants of the ancient Early Christian church of Saint Irene; its contracted form is the present name of the island, Santorini.

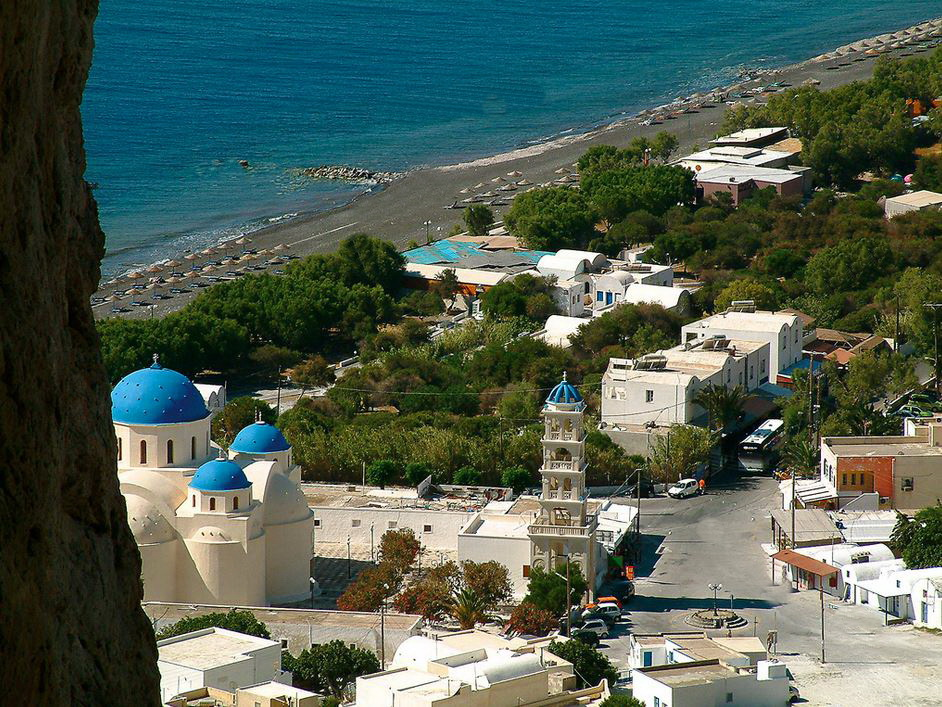
Perissa Santorini Greece, beach of Perissa in Santorini island

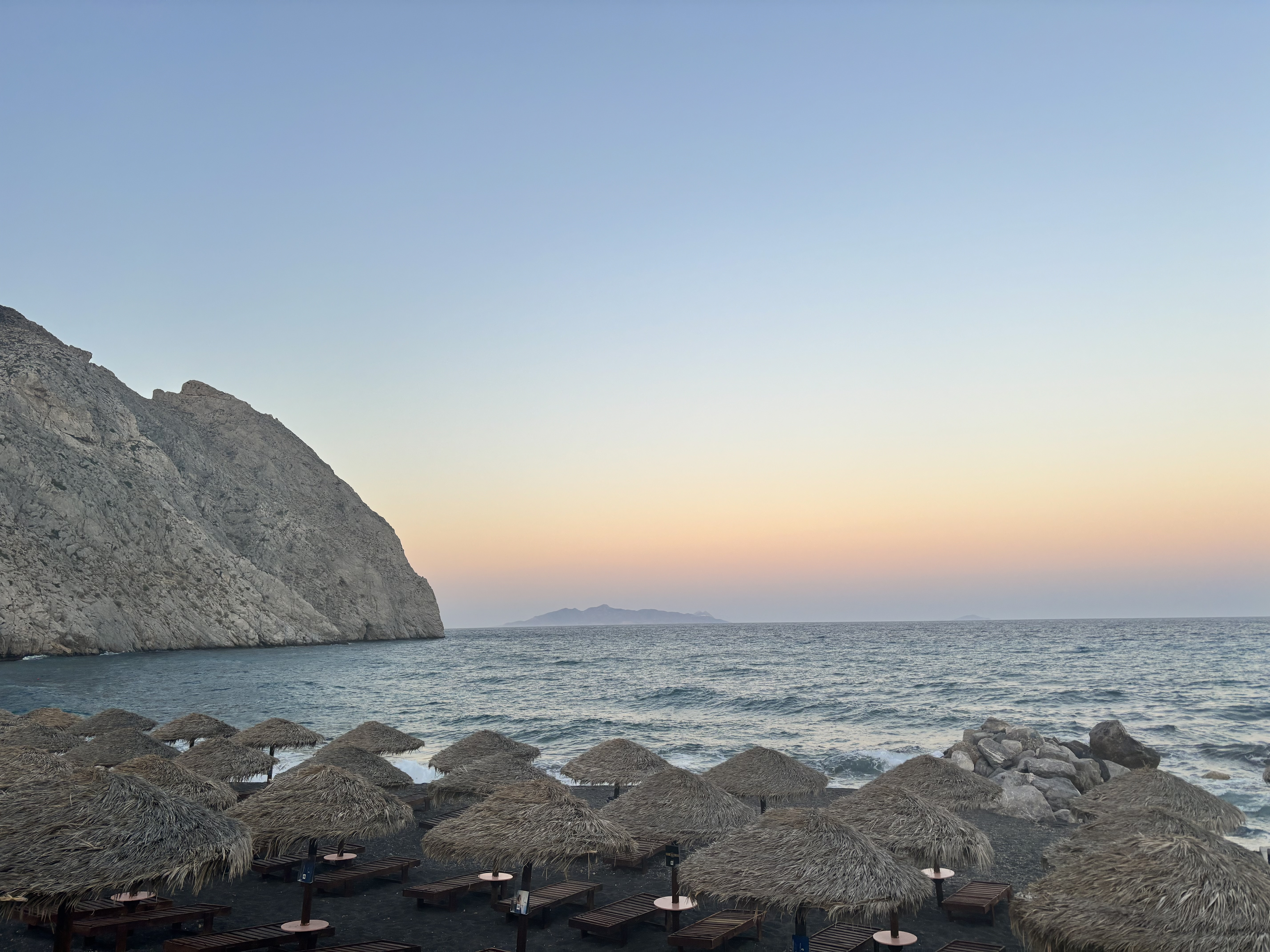
Perissa Beach and Mésa Vounó at sunset in May 2024
