= Glynado =

Glynado Γλυνάδο
- Community
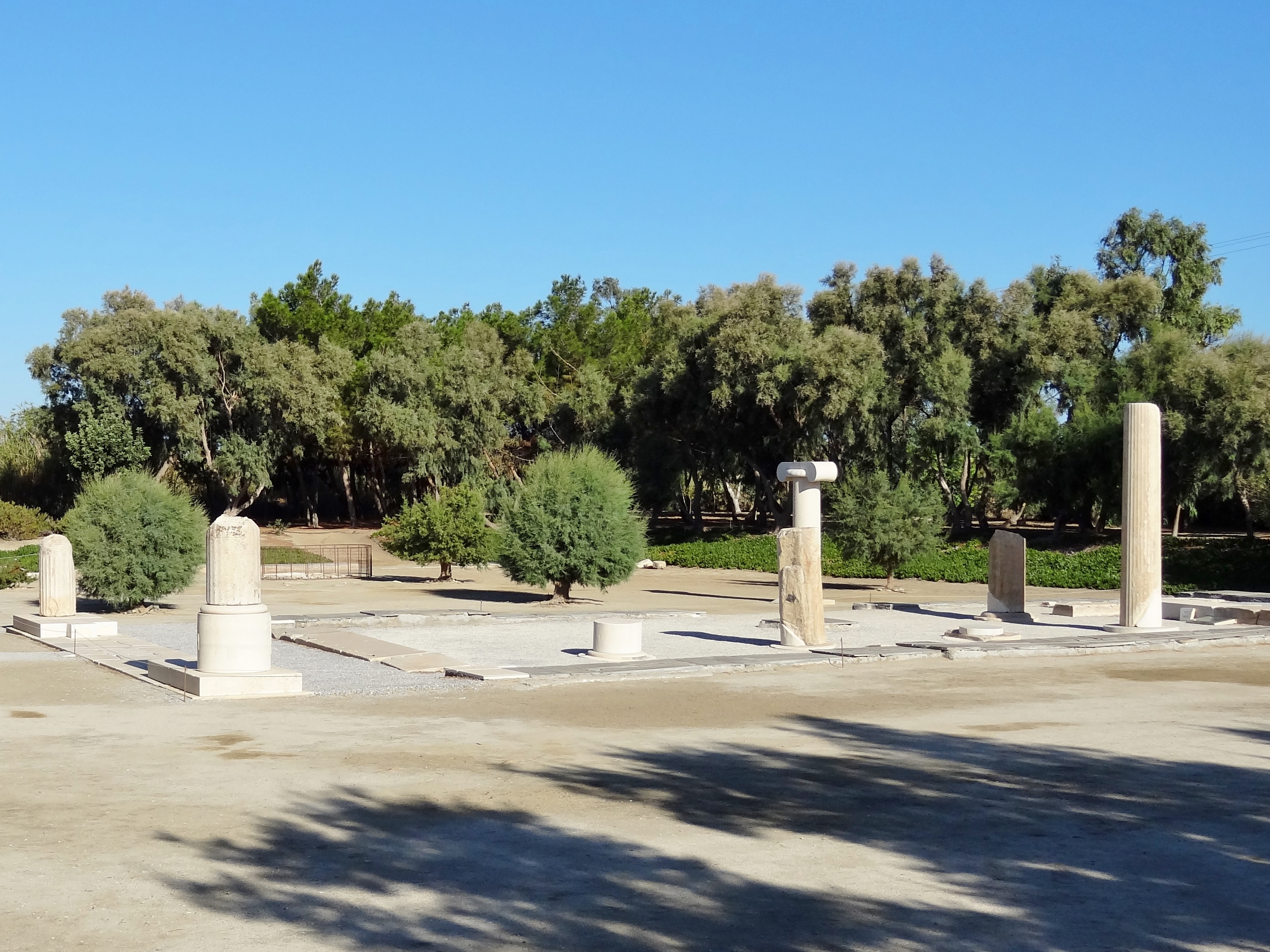
- Sanctuary of Dionysos

- Location within Greece
- Coordinates: 37°04′19″N 25°24′04″E
- Country: Greece
- Administrative region: South Aegean
- Regional unit: Naxos
- Municipality: Naxos

Population (2021)
  - Community: 743
- Time zone: UTC+2 (EET)
  - Summer (DST): UTC+3 (EEST)

Glynado (Greek: Γλυνάδο, also: Γλινάδο Glinado) is a community on the island of Naxos, in the Cyclades, Greece. Its population is 743 (2021 census) but increases in the summer months. Glynado's inhabitants mainly subside of farming in the fertile plain below the village, known as Leivadia, but have also ventured into hospitality services given its picturesque location sprawled out on a hilltop 8 kilometres (5.0 mi) from the Island's capital Chora. It belongs to the municipal unit of Naxos.

== Sanctuary of Dionysos at Yria ==
The temple was located on a marsh below the current village of Glynado, and about three kilometers (1.9 mi) from Naxos town. After excavations were made on the site in the late 1990s, it was revealed that there were, not one, but five temples, overlapped at least since the 9th century B.C.

The first temple consisted of a simple square building, measuring 5 by 10 metres (16 by 33 ft), with an entrance to the Southeast. There were three wood columns in the interior of the building, supporting the wooden structure that was covered by mud bricks. In the middle of the building there was an eschara, an altar of Mycenaean characteristics, which indicates that the worship could be older than this first known building.

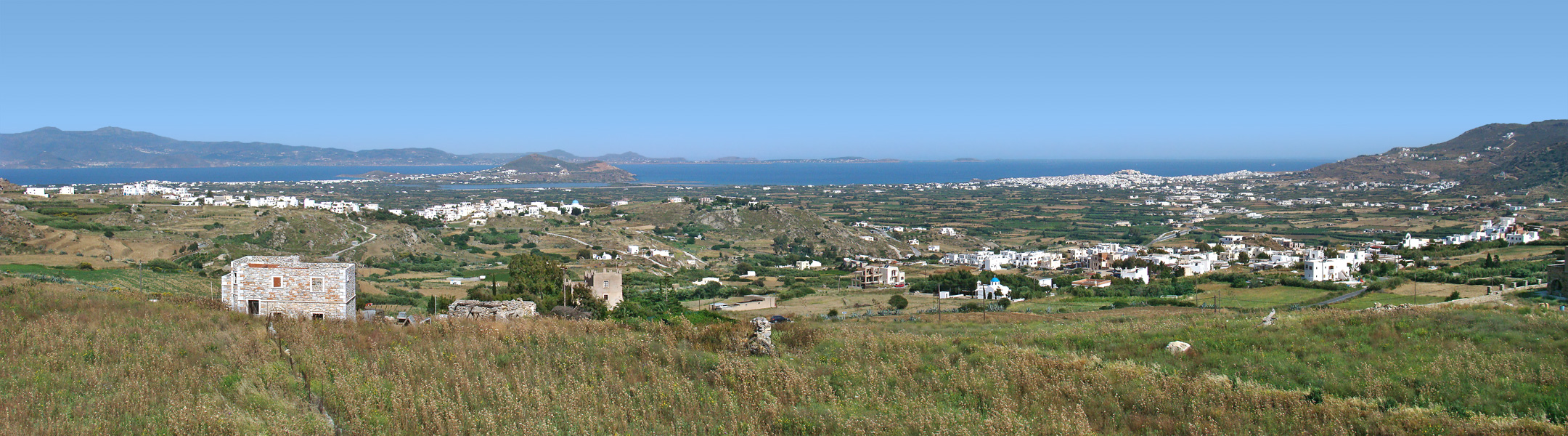
Landscape around Glynado (left) and Galanado (right)

The second occupation phase dates from the middle of the 8th century B.C. This building is similar, in appearance, to the first building. The area occupied is larger, about 11 by 15 metres (36 by 49 ft), and the interior has 3 lines of columns, each line containing five columns, all with marble bases. The eschara wasn't moved but interior benches, that ran along the walls, were added.

In the beginning of the 7th century B.C. there came a new building, with considerable development from the anterior phases. This temple partially uses the exterior walls of the building of the second phase, but it will be longer, 11 by 17 metres (36 by 56 ft). There are two lines of columns in the interior, with three columns each. The bases are still in marble and the space in the middle of the temple is more important. The exterior entrance has now a peristyle, one of the first known in the ancient Greek world, decorated with a terracotta frise. The roof would have marble pipes for water draining and the eschara, in the interior, would have a lantern on top.

The fourth phase of the building, in the middle of the 6th century B.C., would consist of a building that completely covered the other temples, with an area of 13 by 25 metres (43 by 82 ft). The longitudinal and back walls are now in granite and the roofing system is in wood. The rest of the building is in marble: the prostasis, with Ionian columns; the front wall, with cycladic doors; the interior columns and the roof tiles.

The final phase of occupation is a church, built in the 5th century A.D.
