= Emporeio, Santorini =

Emporeio Εμπορείο
- Community
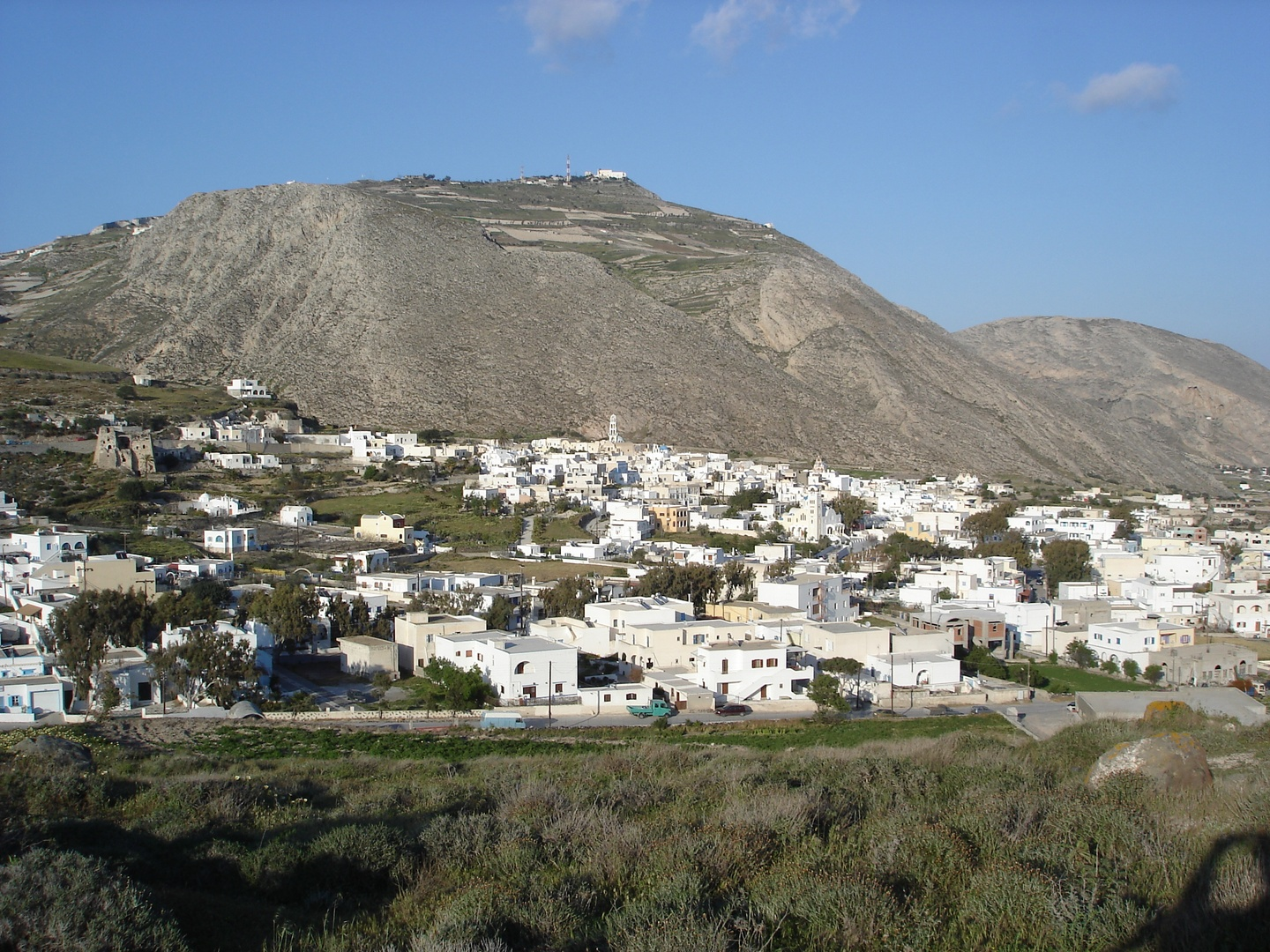

- Location within Greece
- Coordinates: 36°21′30″N 25°26′40″E
- Country: Greece
- Administrative region: South Aegean
- Regional unit: Thira
- Municipality: Thira
- Municipal unit: Thira

Population (2021)
  - Community: 3,704
- Time zone: UTC+2 (EET)
  - Summer (DST): UTC+3 (EEST)

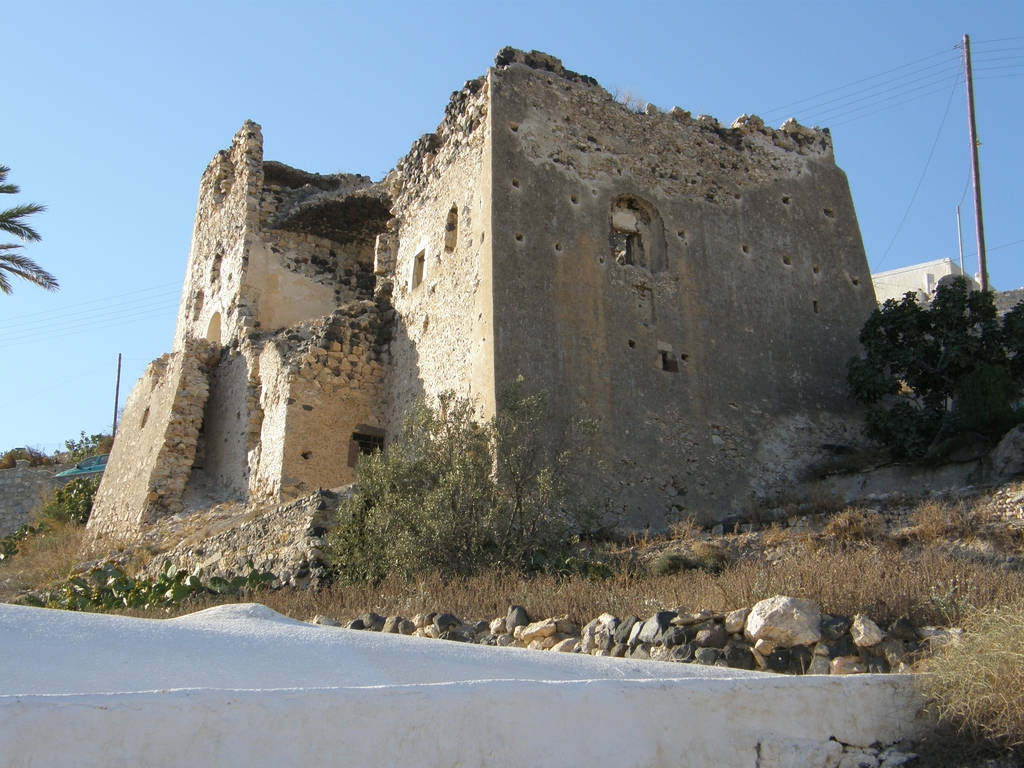
Goulas Castle.

Emporeio (Greek: Εμπορείο), also known as Nimborios (Greek: Νημποριός), is a village on the island of Santorini, Greece. It is located 12 km from Fira, near the Profitis Ilias Mountains.

According to the 2021 census, the community of Emporio has 3,704 permanent inhabitants. The community consists of the villages Emporeio, Perissa, Agios Georgios and Exomytis.

Among other attractions, Emporeio boasts the old Goulas Castle and some churches, such as Saint Nicholas Marmaritis.
