= Feked =

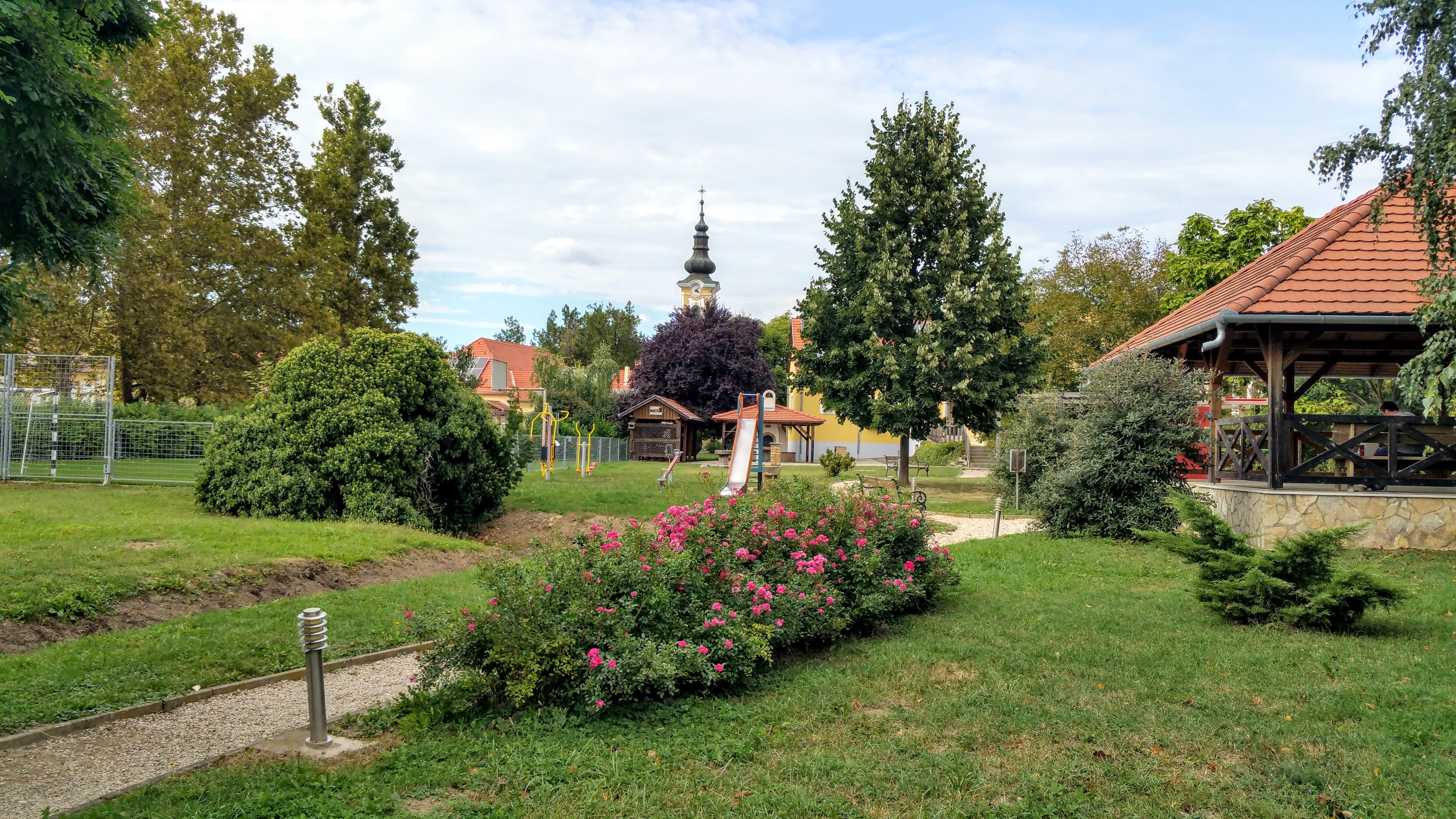

- Location of Baranya county in Hungary

- Location of Feked
- Coordinates: 46.16242°N 18.56016°E
- Country: Hungary
- County: Baranya

Area
  - Total: 19.33 km^{2} (7.46 sq mi)

Population (2004)
  - Total: 212
  - Density: 10.96/km^{2} (28.4/sq mi)
- Time zone: UTC+1 (CET)
  - Summer (DST): UTC+2 (CEST)
- Postal code: 7724
- Area code: 69

Feked is a village in Baranya county, Hungary.
