= Tholaria =

Village on the Greek island of Amorgos

Tholaria Θολάρια
- Community
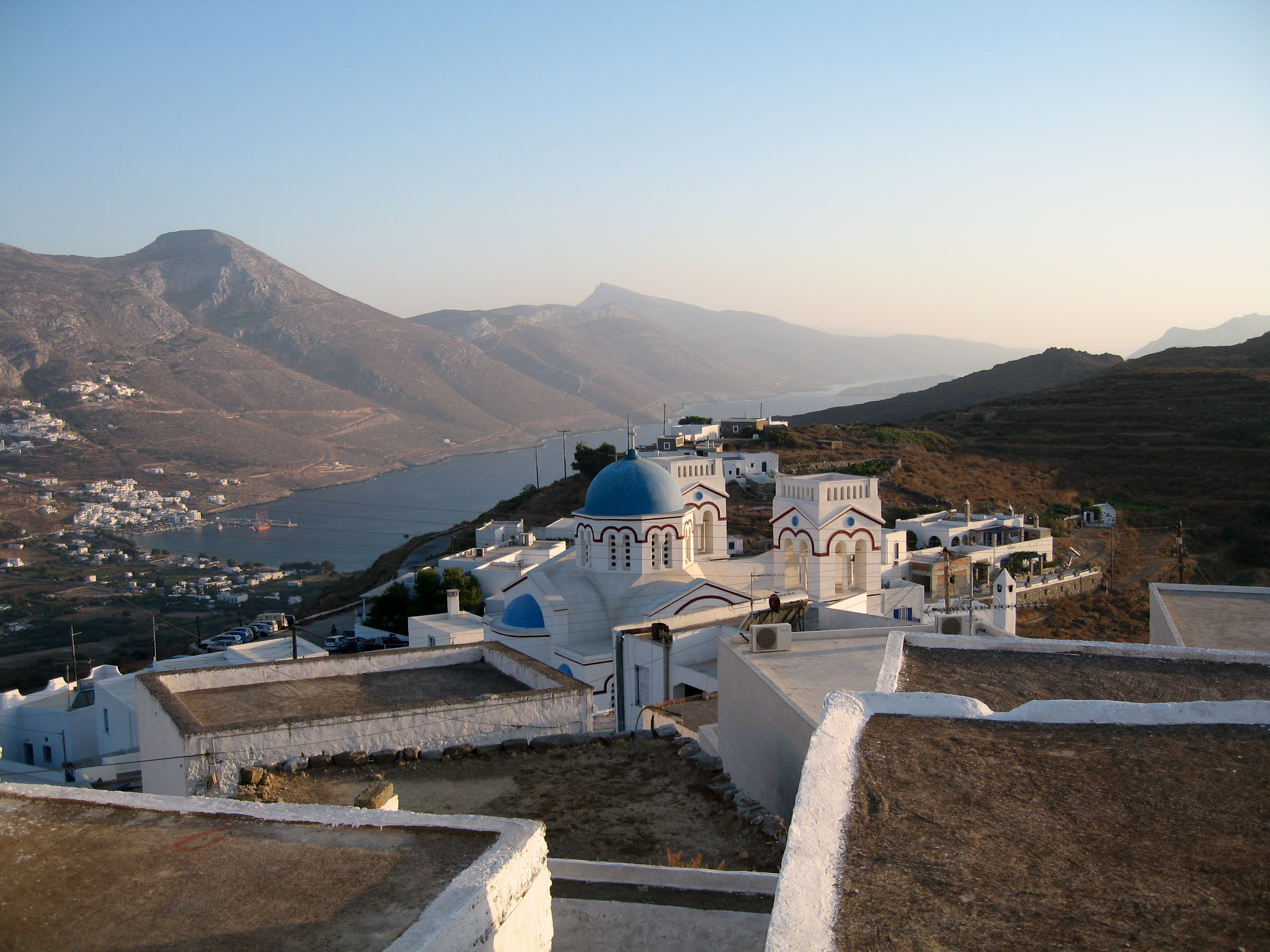
- Village of Tholaria (Aigiali bay)

- Location within Greece
- Coordinates: 36°55′N 25°59′E
- Country: Greece
- Administrative region: South Aegean
- Regional unit: Naxos
- Municipality: Amorgos

Population (2021)
  - Community: 154
- Time zone: UTC+2 (EET)
  - Summer (DST): UTC+3 (EEST)

Tholaria (Greek: Θολάρια, pronounced [θoˈlarʝa]) is a small village on the Greek island of Amorgos, situated on the hill, 3.5 kilometres north of the port of Ormos Aigialis.
