= Aegiale (Amorgos) =

Ancient town on the island of Amorgos

Coordinates: 36°55′10″N 25°58′49″E

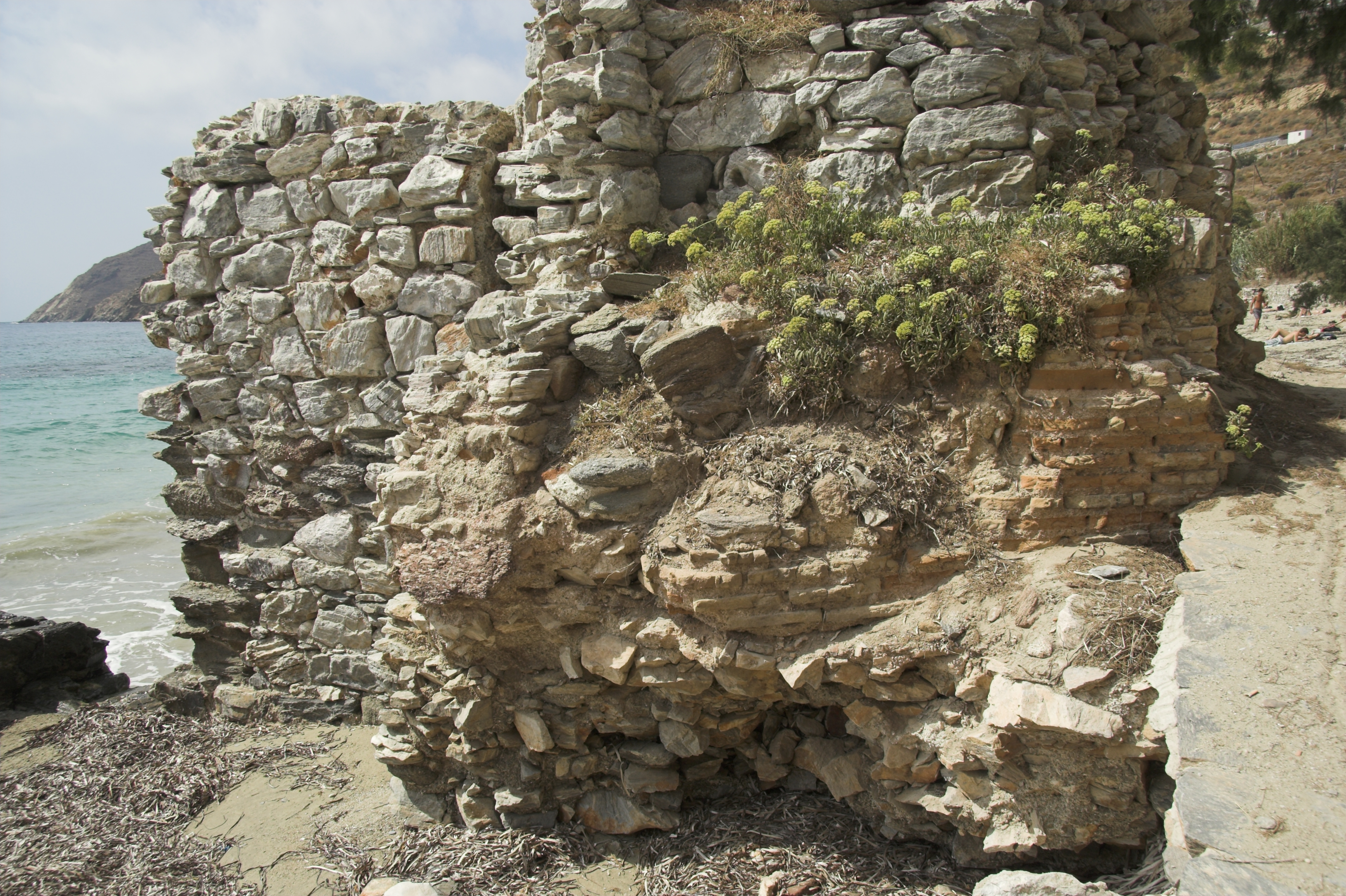
Ruins of the ancient town.

Aegiale or Aigiale (Ancient Greek: Ἀιγιάλη) and Aegialen (Ancient Greek: Αἰγιάλην), also known as Begialis (Βεγιαλίς), was an ancient town on the island of Amorgos.

The site of Aegiale is located near modern Tholaria.
