= Katapola =

Katapola Κατάπολα
- Community
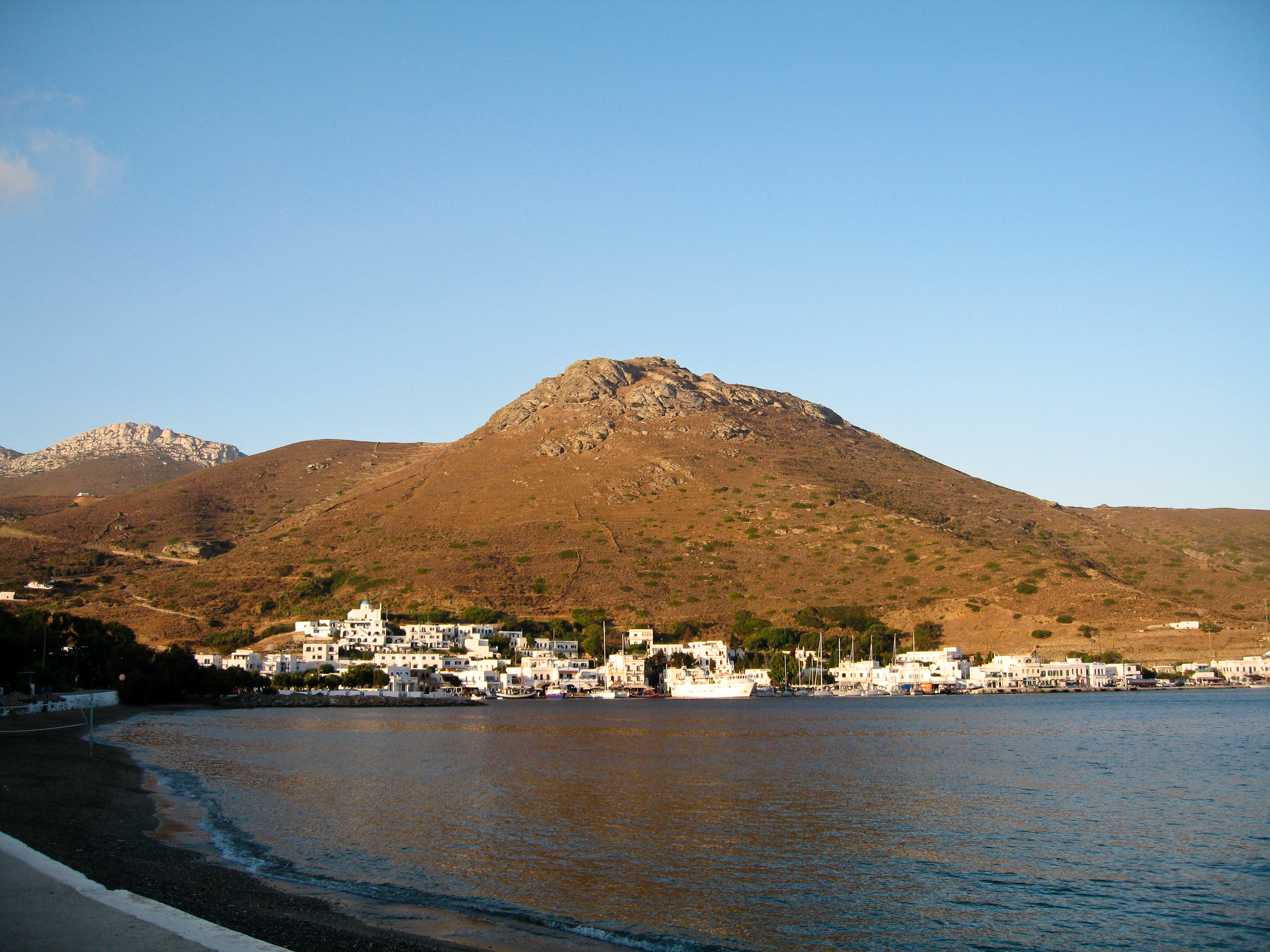
- Katapola and Moundoulia Hill on Amorgos Island

- Location within Greece
- Coordinates: 36°49′34″N 25°51′53″E
- Country: Greece
- Administrative region: South Aegean
- Regional unit: Naxos
- Municipality: Amorgos

Population (2021)
  - Community: 568
- Time zone: UTC+2 (EET)
  - Summer (DST): UTC+3 (EEST)
- Postal code: 84008

Katapola is a small port village on the Greek island of Amorgos, the easternmost island of the Cyclades. It is located at the foot of a hill which was once the site of the ancient town of Minoa. The port can be reached by an eight-hour ferry journey from Athens. The population of Katapola community was 568 as of the 2021 Greek census.
