= Amorgos =

Greek island of the Cyclades in the Aegean

Amorgos Αμοργός
- Municipality
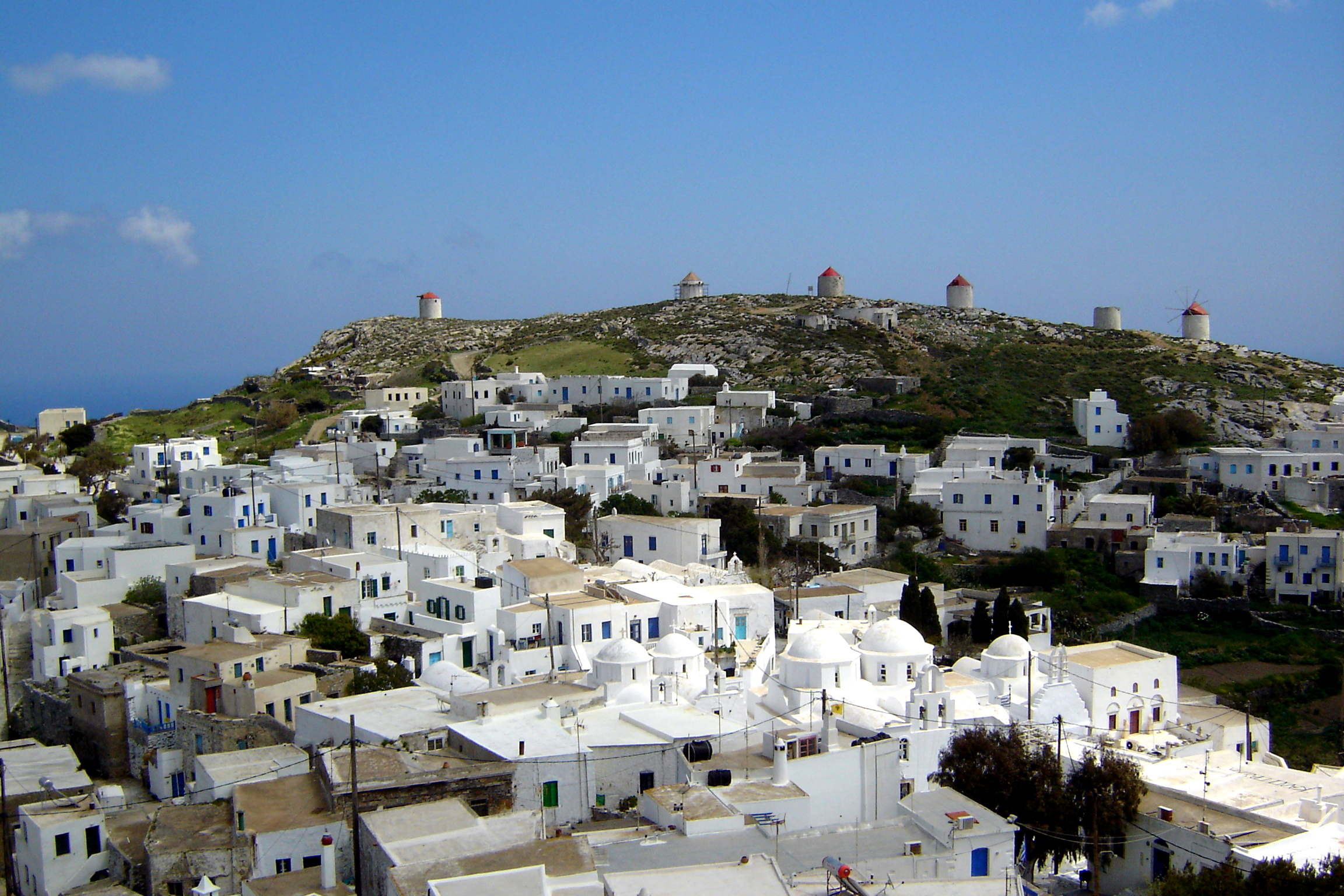
- View of Chora (Amorgos)

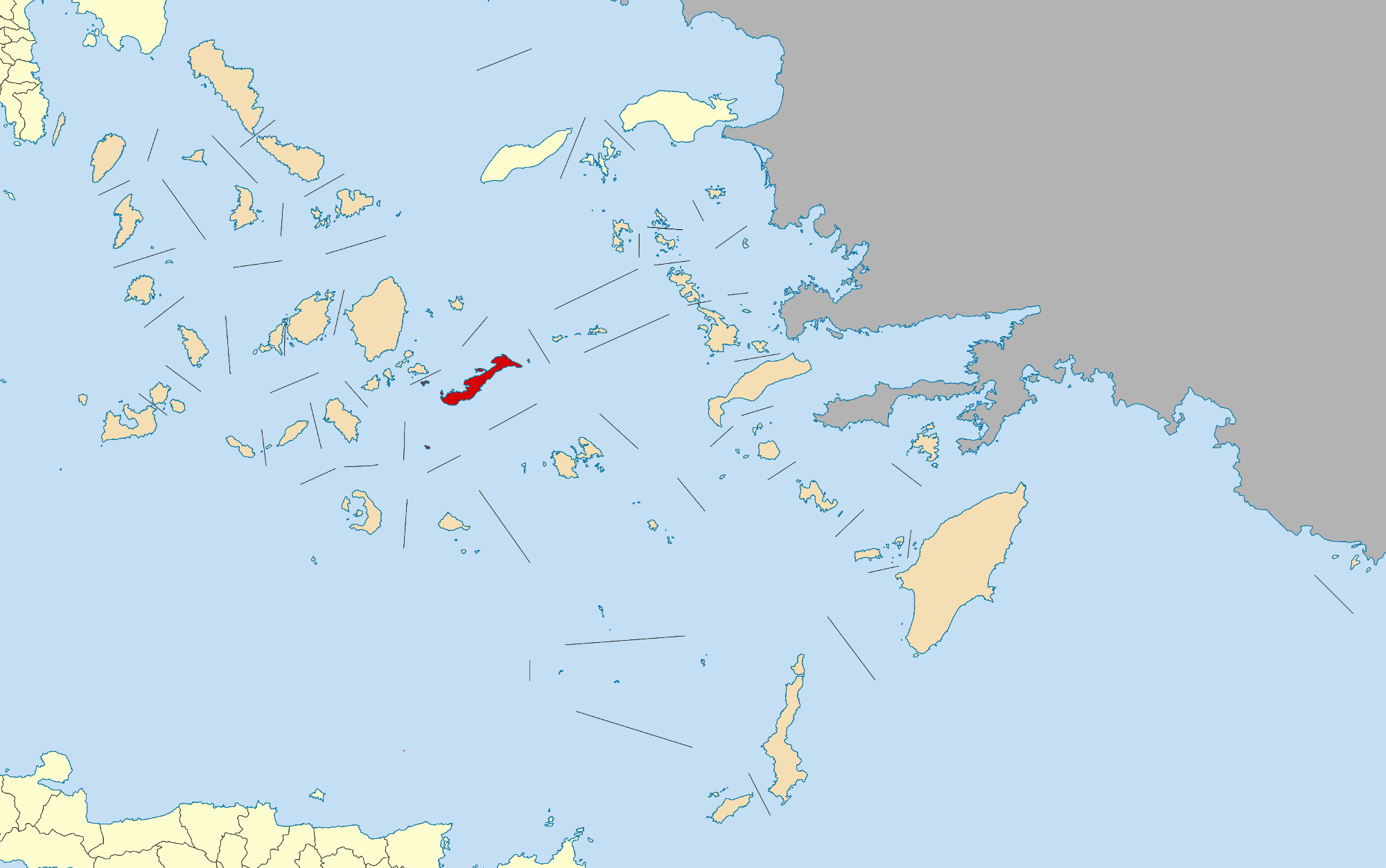

- Location within Greece
- Coordinates: 36°51′N 25°54′E
- Country: Greece
- Geographic region: Cyclades
- Administrative region: South Aegean
- Regional unit: Naxos

Area
  - Municipality: 126.35 km^{2} (48.78 sq mi)
- Highest elevation: 823 m (2,700 ft)
- Lowest elevation: 0 m (0 ft)

Population (2021)
  - Municipality: 1,961
  - Density: 15.52/km^{2} (40.20/sq mi)
  - Community: 446
- Time zone: UTC+2 (EET)
  - Summer (DST): UTC+3 (EEST)
- Postal code: 840 08
- Area code: 22850
- Vehicle registration: EM

Amorgos (Greek: Αμοργός, Amorgós; pronounced [amorˈɣos]) is the easternmost island of the Cyclades island group and the nearest island to the neighboring Dodecanese island group in Greece. Along with 16 neighbouring islets, the largest of which (by land area) is Nikouria Island, it comprises the municipality of Amorgos, which has a land area of 126.346 square kilometres (48.782 square miles) and at the 2021 census had a population of 1,961.

== Geography ==
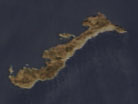
Satellite image of Amorgos

Due to its position near the ancient Ionian towns, such as Miletus, Halicarnassus and Ephesus, Amorgos became one of the first places from which the Ionians passed through to the Cycladic Islands and onto the Greek mainland.

== History ==
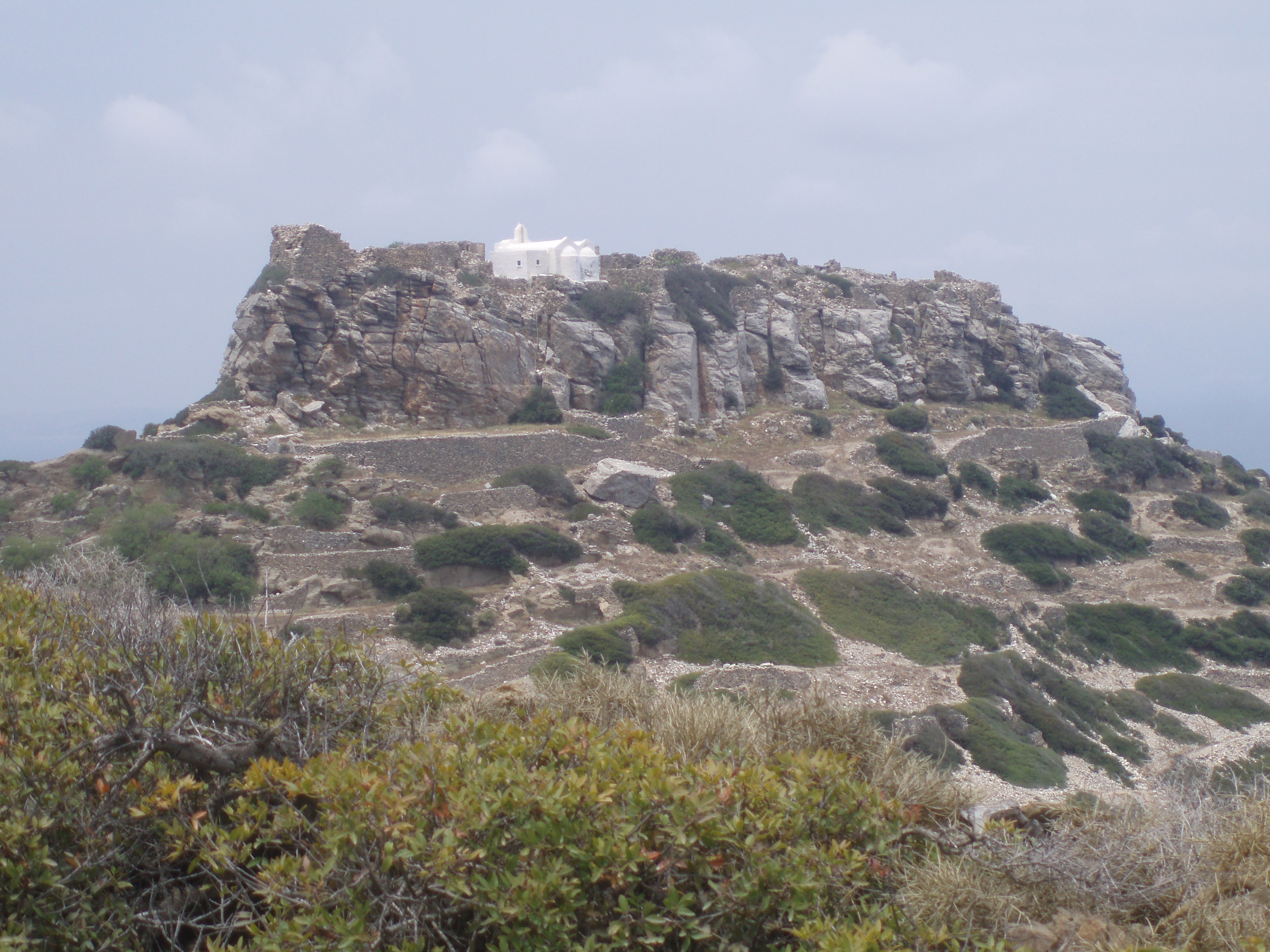
Acropolis of Arkesini

Throughout history, Amorgos was also known as Yperia, or Platagy, Pagali, Psichia, and Karkisia. Amorgos features many remnants of ancient civilizations. At the time of Archaic Greece, there were three independent city-states there. They are believed to have featured autonomous constitutions but the same currency. Amorgos is distinguished by the size and quality of the walls surrounding the city of Arkesine (Ancient Greek: Ἀρκεσίνη), the ancient towers whose remains are scattered around the island, ancient tombs, stone tools, inscriptions, vases and by other antiquities. Arcesine or Arkesine was one of the three main settlements on the island in antiquity.

Due to the name Minoa for one of its ancient cities, it is suspected that Amorgos had been colonized by the Cretans from ancient times, but no known archeological evidence supports this view.

The island was visited by the British explorers Theodore and Mabel Bent in 1883/4.

=== Early Cycladic period ===
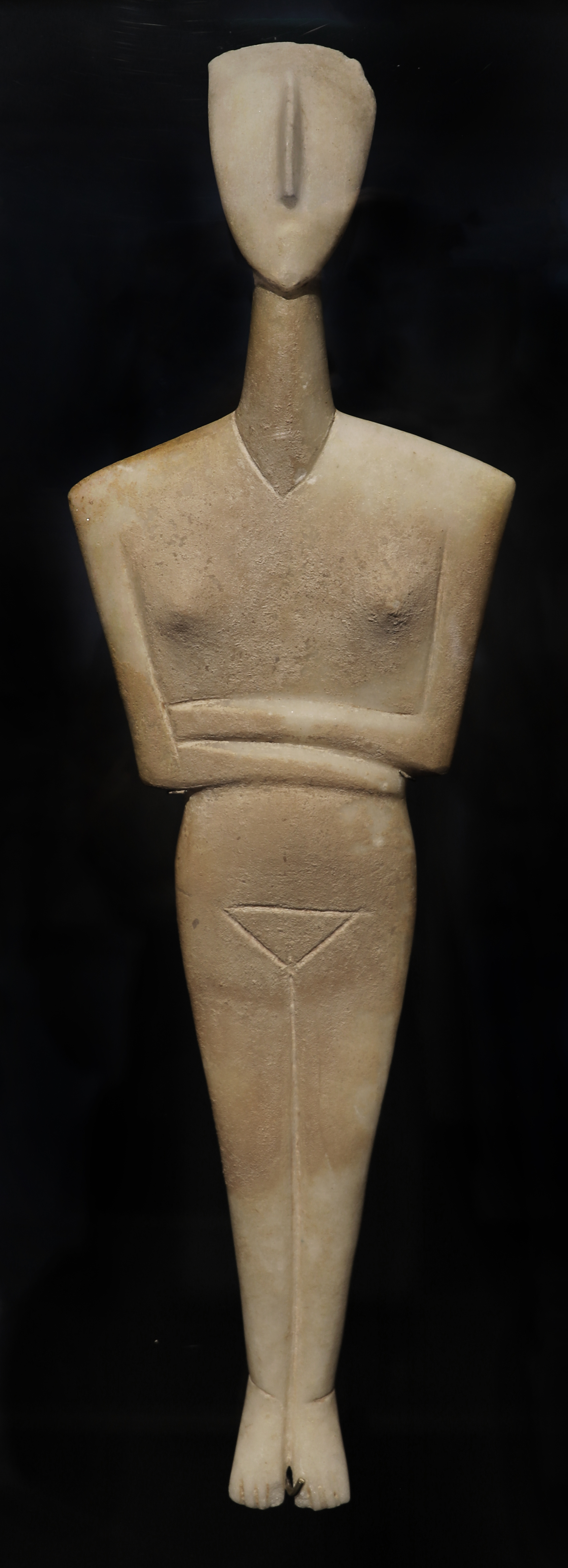
Dokathismata figurine, Early Cycladic II, Syros phase (2800–2300 BC)

Excavations and findings, especially burial tombs, prove the intense presence of Amorgos during the prehistoric years, particularly during the first period of Cycladic civilization (3200 to 2000 BC).

Almost a dozen separate inhabited centres are known in this period. Amorgos is the origin of many famous Cycladic figurines. ‘Dokathismata style’ figurines were originally found here. Cycladic sculptures had been discovered from the cemeteries at Aghia Paraskevi, Aghios Pavlos, Dokathismata, Kapros, Kapsala, Nikouria and Stavros.

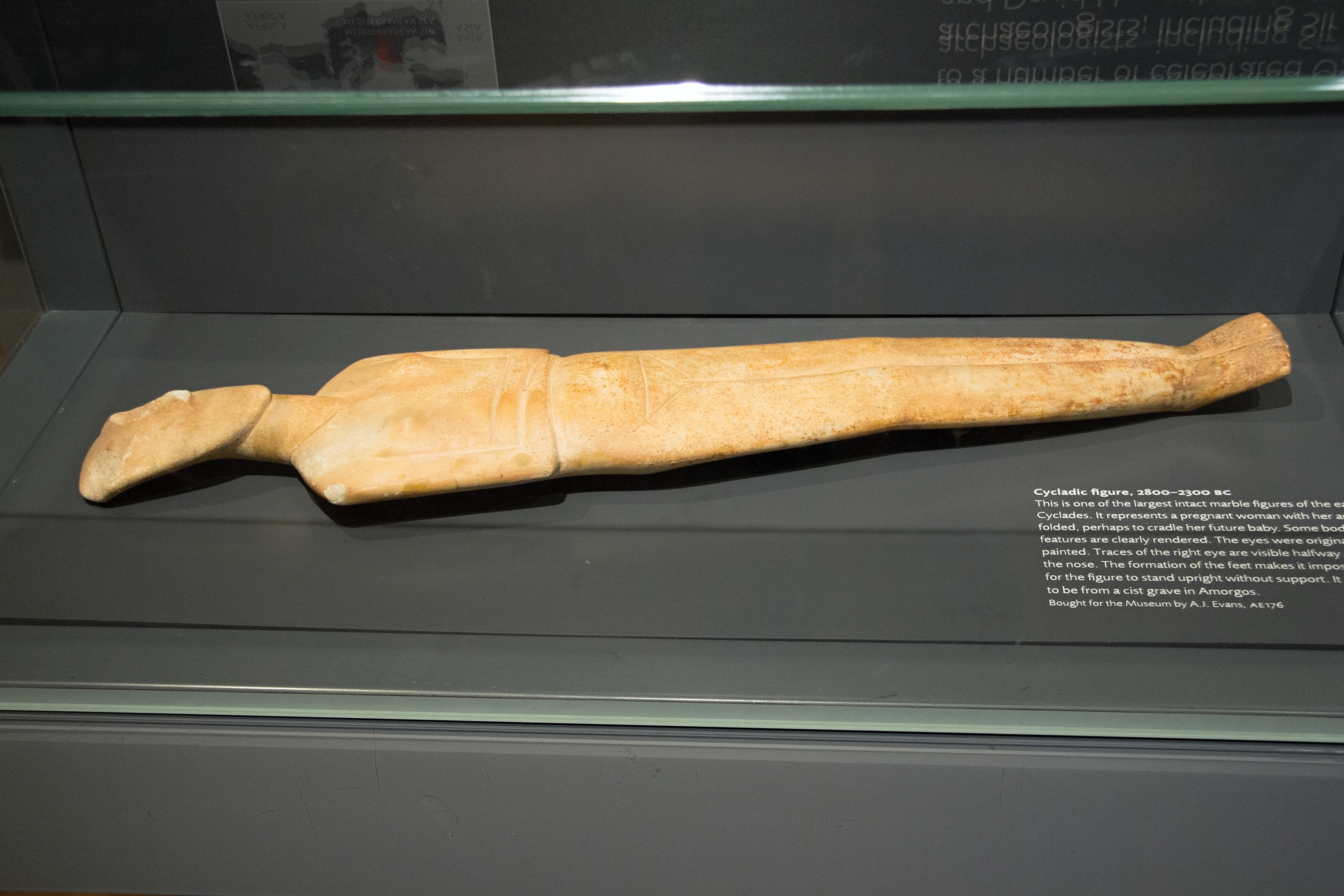
One of the top ten largest Cycladic figures at 75 9cm long, found in a cist grave in Amorgos, 2800-2300 BC, now in the Ashmolean Museum, Oxford

'Kapsala Cycladic figurines', dating around 2700 B.C., are named after a find place in Amorgos. This is the earliest of the 'canonical types' – a reclining female with folded arms. They tend to have slender and elongated proportions. At this time, anatomical features such as arms are modeled three-dimensionally. With the later types, sculptors tended to render this feature with incised lines.

'Dokathismata Cycladic figurines' date from a somewhat later period of 2400–2100 BC. Compared to the statuettes of the Spedos type—the most common and renowned type of figurines featuring finely modeled and somewhat rounded shapes—the statuettes of the Dokathismata type tend to have a more slender and sometimes angular silhouette.

=== Classical period ===
In approximately 630 BC, the poet Semonides led the foundation of a Samian colony on Amorgos. The Periplus of Pseudo-Scylax mentions it as Tripolis. It was a member of the Delian League. It participated in the Second Athenian League.

The names of the three cities given by Stephanus Byzantinus are Arkesini, Minoa, Aigiali or Melania which, according to inscriptions, are the most correct. The three towns are on the island's west coast because that is where bays and natural ports that could provide the proper positioning for seaside towns and forts exist. Aigiali was on the north East Side of the island close to the present day locations of Tholaria and Stroumvos. Minoa was situated at the center of the northern side near the present day village of Katapola and Arkesini on the present-day location Kastri.

In 322 BC, Athens and Macedonia fought the naval Battle of Amorgos.

Heraclides Lembus wrote that the island produced much wine, as well as olive oil and fruits.

With the passing of time, the island's name changed to Amolgon and Amourgon.

=== Byzantine, Venetian, Ottoman and Modern ===
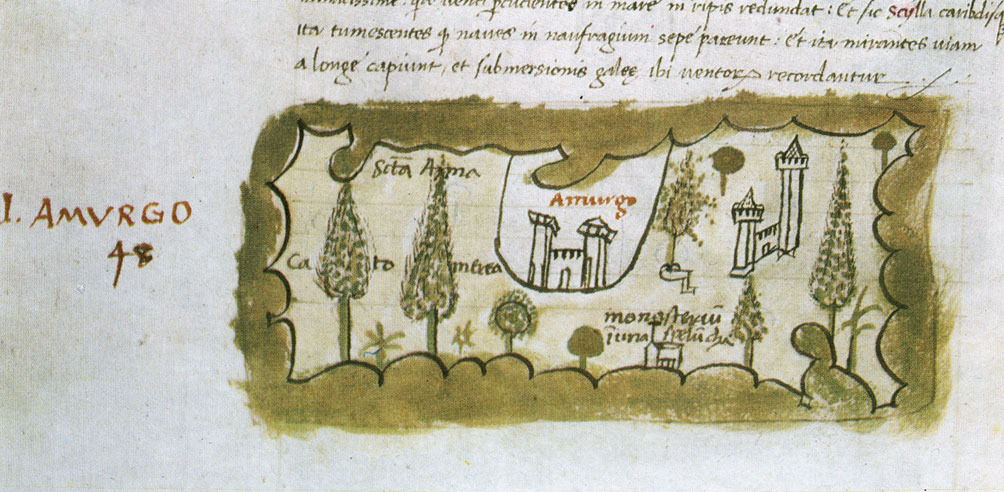
Fifteenth century map by Cristoforo Buondelmonti

In the 5th century, Bishop Theodore, who attended a synod in Constantinople, signed as Bishop of the Parians, Sifnians, and Amoulgians. After the Fourth Crusade it became a dependency of the duchy of Naxos but was later disputed by other Venetians. In 1312, the Hospitaller fleet defeated a fleet of Menteshe at the island.

It was known as Yamurgi during Ottoman rule between 1537 and 1829. It became part of Greece upon independence in 1830.

On 9 July, the 1956 Amorgos earthquake occurred, with its epicentre about 30 km (19 mi) south of the island. The shock had a moment magnitude of 7.7 and had a maximum Mercalli intensity of IX (Violent). The earthquake generated a local tsunami of up to 30 m (98 ft) at Amorgos and nearby islands. Fifty-three people were killed and 100 were injured.

== Municipal districts ==
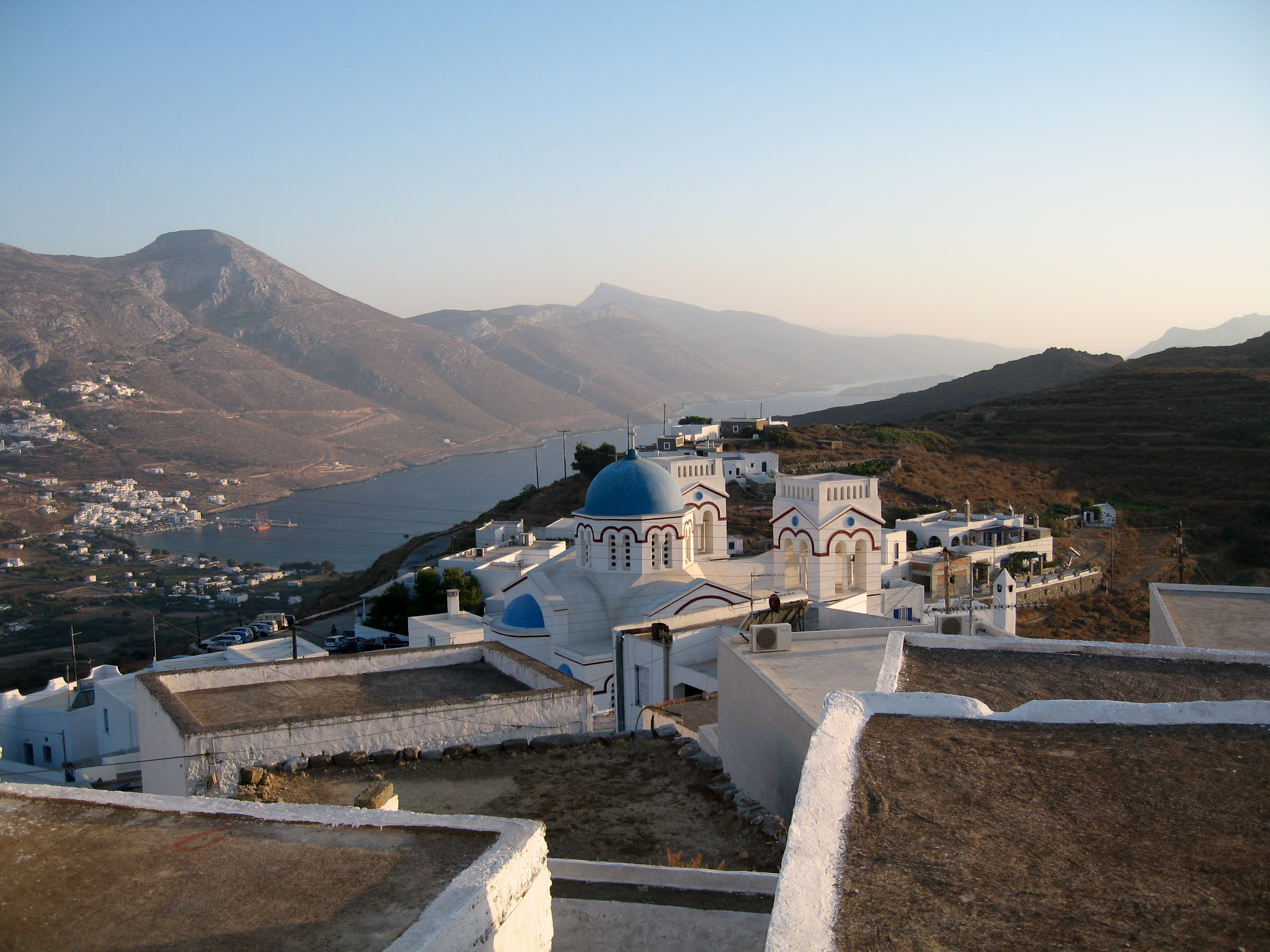
View of Tholaria village

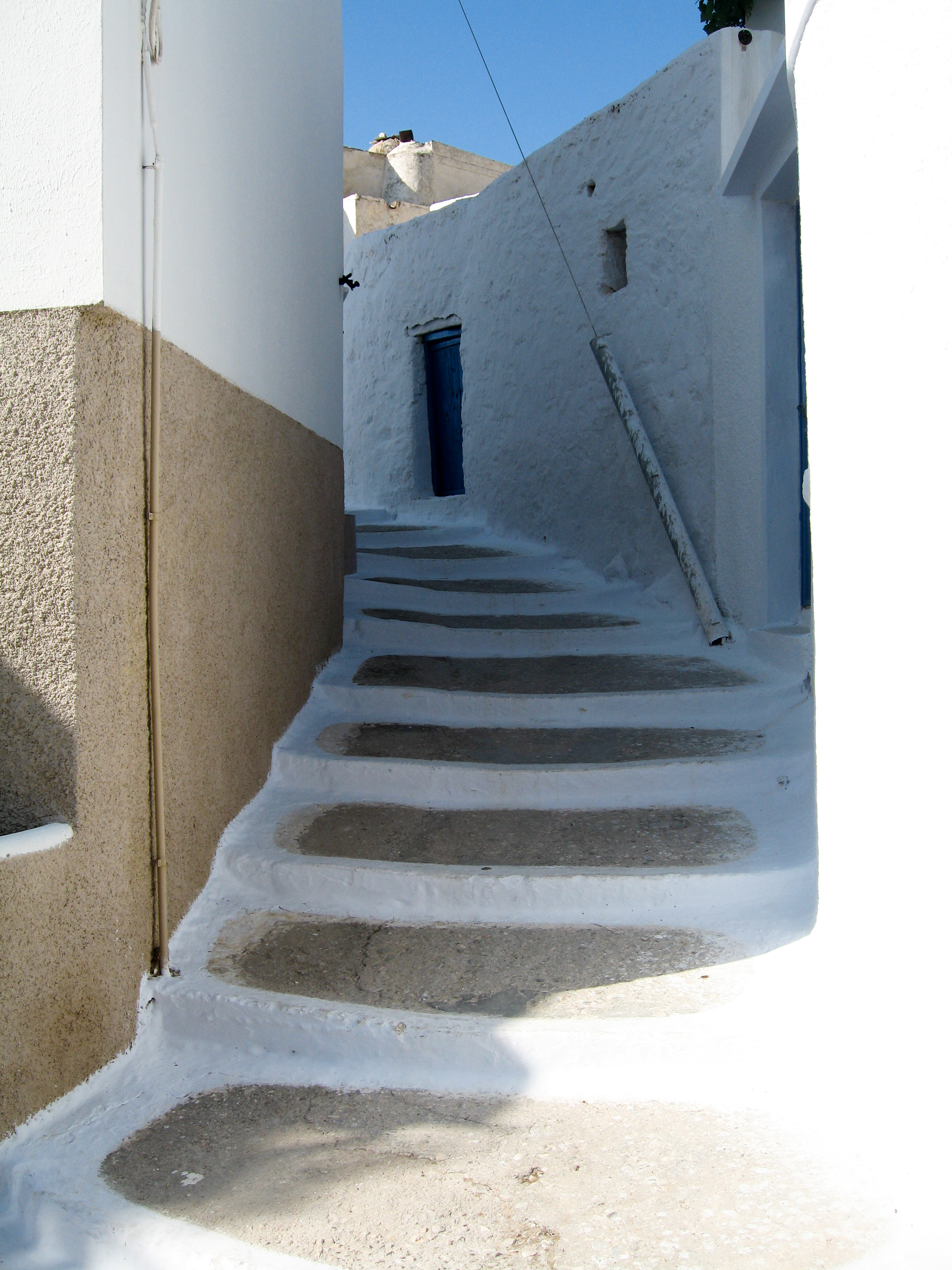
Street of Langada village

The municipality of Amorgos is subdivided into the following communities (population at 2021 census and constituent villages within brackets):

- Aigiali (536, Aigiali, Agios Pavlos, Ormos Egialis, Potamos)
- Amorgos (409, Chora, Kastelopetra)
- Arkesini (182, Arkesini, Kalotaritissa, Kalofana, Mavri Myti, Rachoula)
- Katapola (568, Katapola, Lefkes, Nera, Xylokeratidi, Pera Rachidi, Rachidi, Christoulaki)
- Tholaria (154, Tholaria, Paralia Tholarion)
- Vroutsis (75, Vroutsis, Kamari)

== Historical population ==
Year	Community population	Municipality population
1981	353	–
1991	330	1,632
2001	427	1,852
2011	409	1,973
2021	446	1,961

== Climate ==
Amorgos has a warm-summer Mediterranean climate with mild temperatures all year.

Climate data for Aigiali, Amorgos (3m)
Month	Jan	Feb	Mar	Apr	May	Jun	Jul	Aug	Sep	Oct	Nov	Dec	Year
Mean daily maximum °C (°F)	14.9 (58.8)	15.7 (60.3)	17.4 (63.3)	19 (66)	23.7 (74.7)	27 (81)	27.9 (82.2)	28.3 (82.9)	26.4 (79.5)	24.6 (76.3)	20.9 (69.6)	17.8 (64.0)	22.0 (71.6)
Mean daily minimum °C (°F)	10.8 (51.4)	11.5 (52.7)	12.9 (55.2)	14.4 (57.9)	17.6 (63.7)	22 (72)	23.1 (73.6)	23.6 (74.5)	22.2 (72.0)	20.3 (68.5)	17.3 (63.1)	14.2 (57.6)	17.5 (63.5)
Average precipitation mm (inches)	179.2 (7.06)	146.6 (5.77)	79.4 (3.13)	54 (2.1)	7 (0.3)	1 (0.0)	0 (0)	0 (0)	8.3 (0.33)	16.5 (0.65)	46.6 (1.83)	86.1 (3.39)	624.7 (24.56)
Source: http://penteli.meteo.gr/stations/amorgos/ (2019 - 2020 averages)

== Landmarks ==
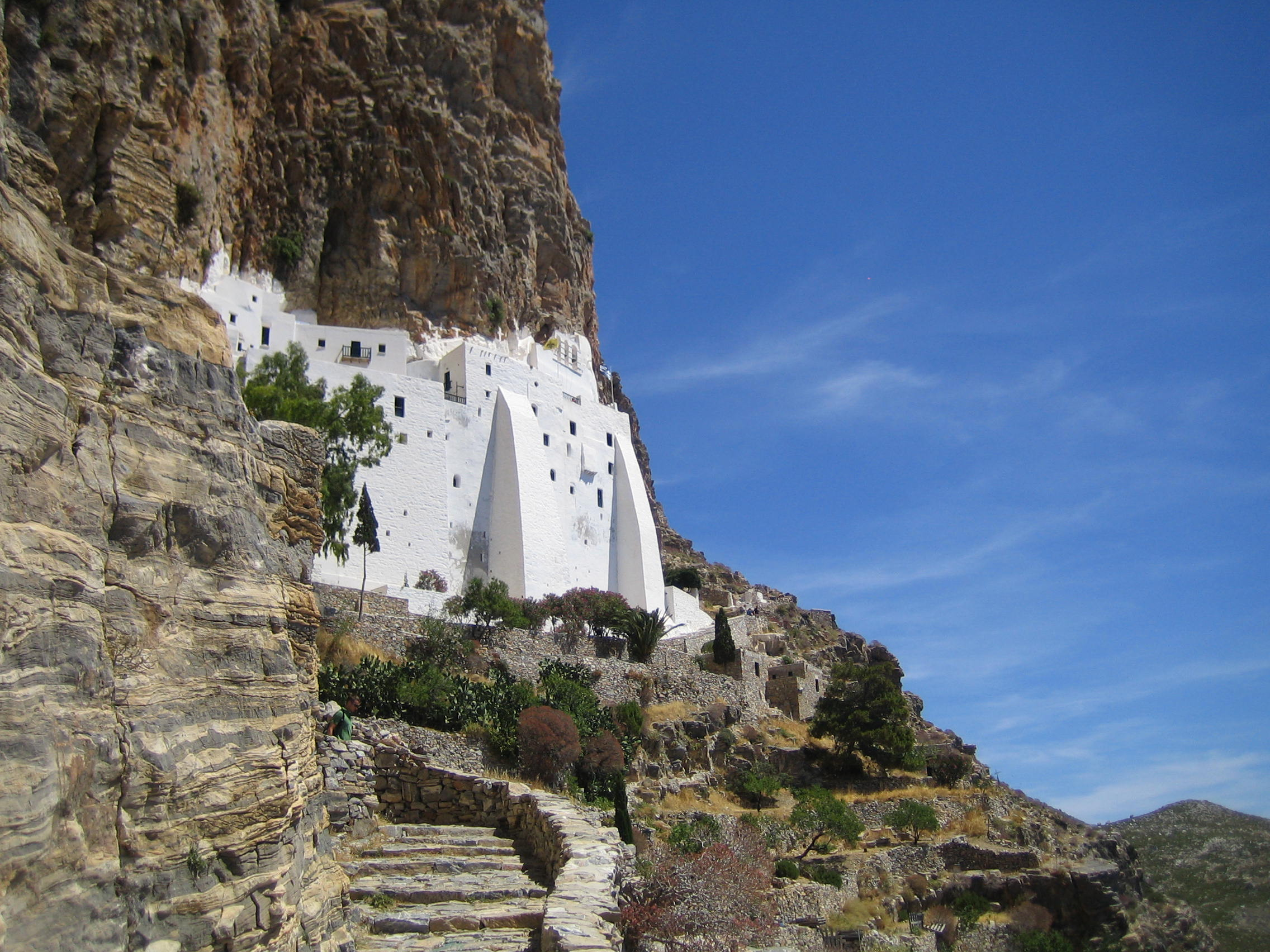
The monastery of Panagia Hozoviotissa.

The monastery of Panagia Hozoviotissa is situated on the cliffside, northeast of Chora. It was built early in the second millennium in order to protect a religious icon, dating from the year 812, from intruders. The icon is on public display inside the monastery. Opening time for visitors every day from 8:00 a.m. to 1:00 p.m and 5:00 p.m. to 7:00 p.m. Visitors have to be dressed in a specific way in order to enter. Men have to wear long trousers and women a skirt or a wrap around shift down to the knee, not trousers. The shift may, however, be worn over trousers. As of July 2012, the monastery is active and houses three practicing monks.

Tourism is increasing slowly, although the island's geographical features prevent mass tourism. It is accessible only by boat. The three main tourist accommodations are located in Katapola, Aegiali and Chora. Hiking paths are relatively well maintained. Other activities include scuba diving, free-diving, and visiting the island's beaches (although this isn't its main attraction, like other Greek islands).

Another landmark in the area is a group of windmills that can be seen on a hill above Chora. A couple of them can be visited, while others are either locked or in ruins. It's easy to reach the location either by car or on foot, going through Chora. There is no admission to enter the area.

== In popular culture ==
Amorgos was predominately featured for its rich aquatic life and architectural aesthetic in the 1988 film The Big Blue by the French director Luc Besson. The success of the film transformed the island into an international destination for tourists and freediving communities. Amorgos was also featured in the 2023 film Two Tickets to Greece by Marc Fitoussi.

== See also ==
- List of settlements in the Cyclades
- List of islands of Greece
- Markiani

== Sources ==
- Saint-Guillain, Guillaume (2001). "AMORGOS AU XIVe SIÈCLE. Une seigneurie insulaire entre Cyclades féodales et Crète vénitienne". Byzantinische Zeitschrift (in French). 94 (1): 62–189. doi:10.1515/byzs.2001.94.1.62. ISSN 0007-7704. S2CID 191576963.
- Berkmoes, Ryan Ver; Averbuck, Alexis; Iatrou, Helen; Maric, Vesna; Peevers-Shulte, Andrea (2025). Lonely Planet Greek Islands. Lonely Planet. ISBN 9781837588077.
- Wendy Ide (19 May 2024). "Two Tickets to Greece review – a holiday you may want to cut short". The Guardian.
- Deborah Ross (18 May 2024). "Predictable but has a certain French verve: Two Tickets to Greece reviewed". The Spectator.
- Nell Minow (14 July 2023). "Two Tickets to Greece". Roger Ebert Reviews.
- Tzanelli, Rodanthi (2020). Magical Realist Sociologies of Belonging and Becoming. Taylor & Francis. ISBN 9781000036688.
