= Nezer =

Nezer may refer to:

- Christoforos Nezer (Bavarian) (1808–1883), Bavarian officer who settled in Greece
- Christoforos Nezer (d. 1970) (1887–1970), Greek actor who as the cousin of Marika Nezer
- Christoforos Nezer (d. 1996) (1903–1996), Greek actor and brother of Marika Nezer
- Marika Nezer (1906–1989), Greek actress
