= Christoforos Nezer =

Christoforos Nezer may refer to:

- Christoph Neeser, Bavarian soldier who went to Greece in the 1830s
- Christoforos Nezer (d. 1970), Greek actor, grandson of the above
- Christoforos Nezer (d. 1995), Greek actor, cousin of the above
