= Koumaros, Tinos =

Village on Tinos, Greece

Koumaros Κουμάρος
- Village
- Interactive map of Koumaros
- Coordinates: 37°34′59″N 25°10′16″E
- Country: Greece
- Region: South Aegean
- Regional unit: Tinos
- Municipality: Tinos
- Municipal unit: Exomvourgo

Population (2021)
  - Total: 19
- Website: koumaros-tinos.gr/en/

Koumaros (Greek: Κουμάρος) is a village in the centre of the island of Tinos, in the Cyclades, Greece. It lies near Exomvourgo, the hill of the island's old castle town, and belongs to the municipal unit of Exomvourgo.

== History ==
After Ottoman rule, the village was officially attached in 1835 to the then municipality of Steni. It has been listed as a traditional settlement since 1988.

== Population ==
The village had 103 inhabitants in 1928 and 19 permanent residents in the 2021 Greek census.

== Association ==
The "O Koumaros" Association was founded in 1976 by people from the village living in Athens.
