= Komi, Tinos =

Komi Κώμη
- Community
- Location within Greece
- Coordinates: 37°36′07″N 25°08′38″E
- Country: Greece
- Administrative region: South Aegean
- Regional unit: Tinos
- Municipality: Tinos
- Municipal unit: Exomvourgo

Population (2021)
  - Community: 309
- Time zone: UTC+2 (EET)
  - Summer (DST): UTC+3 (EEST)

Komi (Greek: Κώμη) is a small village and a community on the island of Tinos, a Cycladic island in Greece. The community consists of the settlements Kolympithra, Krokos, Komi, Perastra and Skalados. Its population was 309 at the 2021 census. It has a Catholic church, and offers Cycladic type architecture. Every year, on August 29, a big party is held there, with visitors from various parts of Greece and even foreigners.
