= Donacea =

Ancient town on Tenos, Greece

Donacea or Donakea (Ancient Greek: Δονακέα) was an ancient town on the island of Tenos. It is mentioned in ancient inscriptions.

Its site is tentatively located near Livada.
