= Eschatiota =

Eschatiota (Ancient Greek: Ἐσχατιώτα) was an ancient town on the island of Tenos. It is mentioned in ancient inscriptions.

Its site is tentatively located on Tenos.
