= Exomvourgo (municipality) =

Exomvourgo Εξώμβουργο
- Municipal unit
- Location within Tinos

- Location within Greece
- Coordinates: 37°36′N 25°08′E
- Country: Greece
- Administrative region: South Aegean
- Regional unit: Tinos
- Municipality: Tinos

Population (2021)
  - Municipal unit: 2,276
- Time zone: UTC+2 (EET)
  - Summer (DST): UTC+3 (EEST)
- Vehicle registration: EM

Exomvourgo (Greek: Εξώμβουργο) is a former municipality on the island of Tinos, in the Cyclades, Greece. Since the 2011 local government reform it is part of the municipality Tinos, of which it is a municipal unit. The population was 2,276 at the 2021 census. Its land area is 138.213 km². The seat of the municipality was in Xinara. The municipal unit shares the island of Tinos with the municipal units of Tinos (town) and Panormos.

== Election results ==
Election	Turnout	ND	PASOK	SYRIZA	KKE	Other
Jun 2023	52.87	45.10	19.24	16.62	6.38	12.66 (Note: EL 2.48 PE 2.38 Μ25 2.10 OP 1.33 Spartiates 1.14 Other 3.23)
May 2023	58.78	45.90	14.29	17.36	6.65	15.80 (Note: OP 3.84 Μ25 2.42 EL 2.12 PE 1.60 Enono 1.17 Other 4.65)
2019	59.20	39.54	12.12	33.46	5.38	9.50 (Note: Μ25 2.56 EL 1.74 XA 1.12 EK 1.08 PE 1.03 Other 1.97)
Sep 2015	51.04	33.46	7.96	37.39	3.66	17.53 (Note: Potami 4.63 EK 3.79 XA 2.41 LAE 2.04 ANEL 1.62 ANTARSYA 1.11 Other 1.93)
Jan 2015	52.11	32.75	5.32	35.21	3.62	23.10 (Note: Potami 9.84 ANEL 3.85 KIDISO 2.46 XA 2.33 EK 1.70 Teleia 1.30 Other 1.62)
Jun 2012	53.33	37.34	17.58	18.98	3.11	22.99 (Note: DIMAR 9.59 ANEL 5.04 XA 2.46 OP 1.52 DIXA 1.35 Other 3.03)
May 2012	54.85	23.71	14.92	12.15	6.02	43.20 (Note: DIMAR 12.60 ANEL 6.62 OP 4.21 XA 3.57 DIXA 2.77 DISY 2.57 LAOS 2.29 DP 1.60 Drassi 1.52 KPE 1.24 OXI 1.00 Other 3.21)
2009	65.57	36.28	48.93	4.59	4.12	6.08 (Note: OP 2.92 LAOS 1.68 Other 1.48)
2007	68.37	45.79	39.89	7.78	4.00	2.54
2004	61.22	47.41	44.87	3.11	2.03	2.58 (Note: DIKKI 1.46 Other 1.12)
2000	76.38	42.88	47.13	4.19 (Note: as Syn)	1.63	4.17 (Note: DIKKI 3.05 Other 1.12)
1996	79.22	40.39	46.43	3.38	1.24	8.56 (Note: DIKKI 5.80 POLAN 1.55 Other 1.21)
1993	84.37	41.78	51.37	1.39	0.75	4.71 (Note: POLAN 4.17 Other 0.54)
1990	81.83	50.29	45.35	2.86		1.50
Nov 1989	84.61	49.33	46.14	3.45		1.08
Jun 1989	84.91	48.23	44.69	4.82		2.26 (Note: DIANA 1.20 Other 1.06)
1985	83.93	45.74	49.98	1.02 (Note: as KKE-Es)	2.50	0.76
1981	81.64	49.68	46.50	0.34	2.70	0.78
1977	80.16	50.70	17.35	0.59 (Note: as Symmachia)	1.57	29.79 (Note: EDIK 28.34 EP 1.21 Other 0.24)
1974	84.79	59.44	2.39	0.74		37.43 (Note: EK-ND 36.63 Other 0.80)
