= Panormos, Tinos =

Panormos Πάνορμος
- Municipal unit
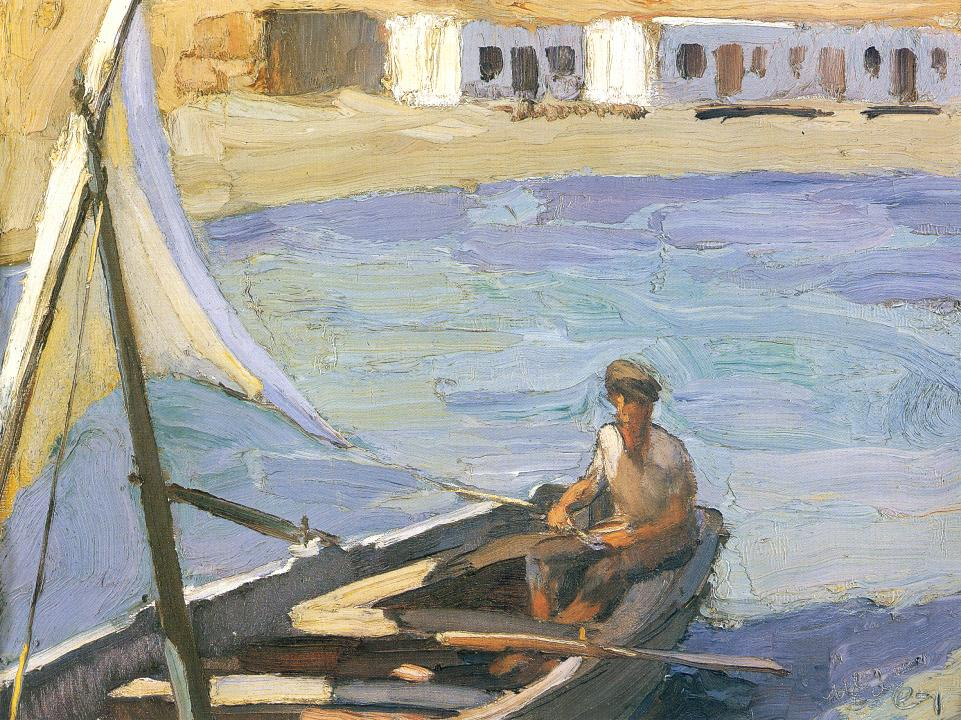
- Oil painting, Boat with Sail (Panormos, Tinos) by Nikolaos Lytras dating from 1923-26.

- Location within the Cyclades

- Location within Greece
- Coordinates: 37°38′22″N 25°02′25″E
- Country: Greece
- Administrative region: South Aegean
- Regional unit: Tinos
- Municipality: Tinos

Area
  - Municipal unit: 33.4 km^{2} (12.9 sq mi)

Population (2021)
  - Municipal unit: 566
  - Municipal unit density: 16.9/km^{2} (43.9/sq mi)
- Time zone: UTC+2 (EET)
  - Summer (DST): UTC+3 (EEST)
- Vehicle registration: EM

Panormos (Greek: Πάνορμος) or Ormos Panormou, is a village and a former community on the island of Tinos in the Cyclades, Greece. It is a small fishing village located in a cove on the northeastern edge of the island.

Since the 2011 local government reform it is part of the municipality Tinos, of which it is a municipal unit. The population was 566 at the 2021 census and the land area is 33.378 km^{2}. It shares the island of Tinos with the municipal units of Tinos (town) and Exomvourgo.

== Notable people ==
- Yannoulis Chalepas (1851–1938), sculptor
- Nikiforos Lytras (1832–1904), painter

== Gallery ==
Panormos cove

houses in the harbor

fishing boat above the harbor
