= Volax =

Village on Tinos in the Cyclades, Greece

Coordinates: 37°35′32″N 25°10′40″E

Volax (Greek: Βώλαξ) or Volakas is a small village on the island of Tinos, in the Cyclades, Greece. The population was 51 at the 2011 census.

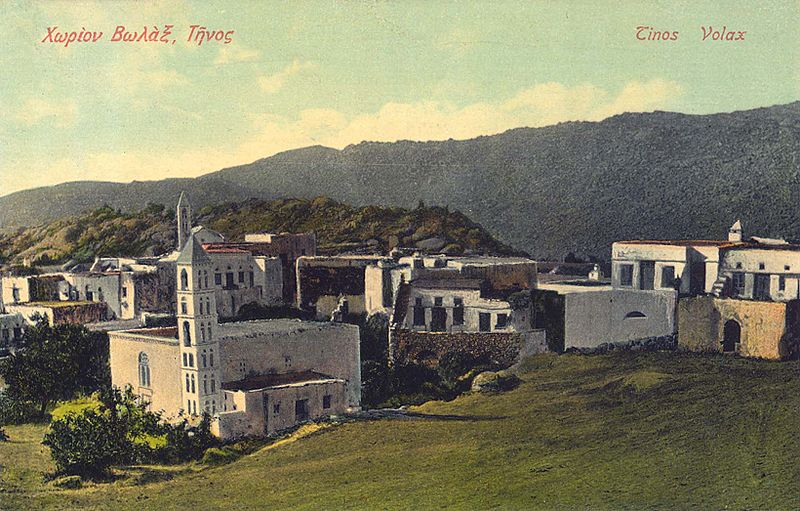
Volax, Tinos island, Greece [postcard 1907]

It was established in the 14th century or earlier. It lies on a small plateau in the centre of Tinos at an average altitude of 284m above sea level. It rests in a gorge that looks as if it has been pelted with boulders: large, almost perfectly spherical grey rocks dot the plateau and slopes around the village, giving the whole landscape a lunar appearance. Many houses are built above these rocks and near each other according to the rules of traditional Cycladic architecture. It has traditionally been a home of basket weavers.

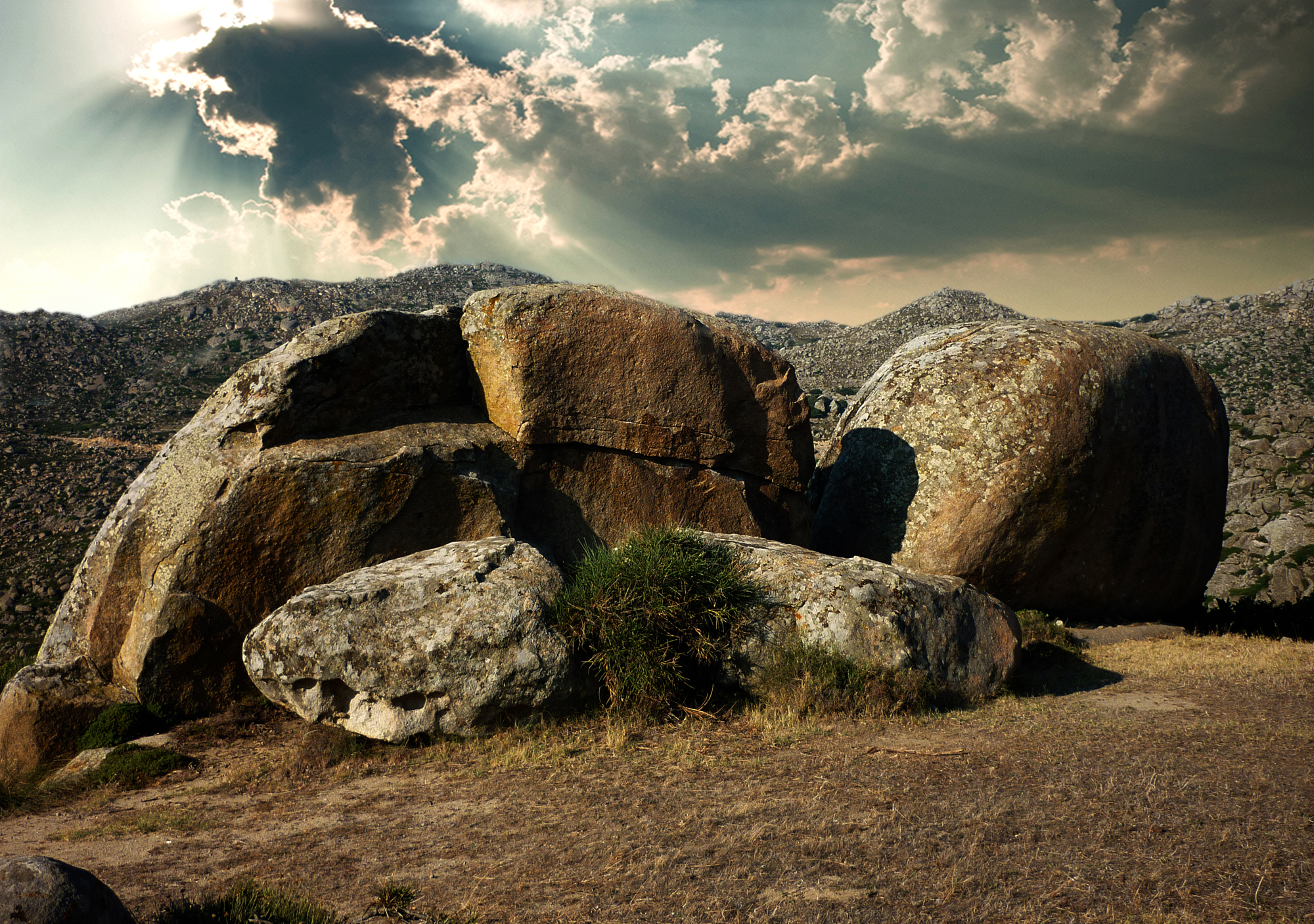
Volax. Landscape

Among the oldest villages of the island, Volax was officially registered under the name Volacus in the 1618 state documents of the former Venice administration. Today it is a tourist destination. In the Easter period athletes from all over the world gather to exercise in the rocks (bouldering). In the spring also, it is a destination for many paintball sport teams.

The village has a small folklore museum, which opens during the summer period, and a 380-seat amphitheatre where many musical and theatrical performances take place. Volax celebrates twice a year: 1) in Easter time when a local festival takes place in the nearby chapel of "Panagia Kalaman" and 2) on 8 September when the village praises and honors the Blessed Virgin Mary’s birth.
