= Kampos, Tinos =

Kampos Κάμπος
- Community
- Location within Greece
- Coordinates: 37°34′42″N 25°8′55″E
- Country: Greece
- Administrative region: South Aegean
- Regional unit: Tinos
- Municipality: Tinos
- Municipal unit: Exomvourgo

Population (2021)
  - Community: 214
- Time zone: UTC+2 (EET)
  - Summer (DST): UTC+3 (EEST)

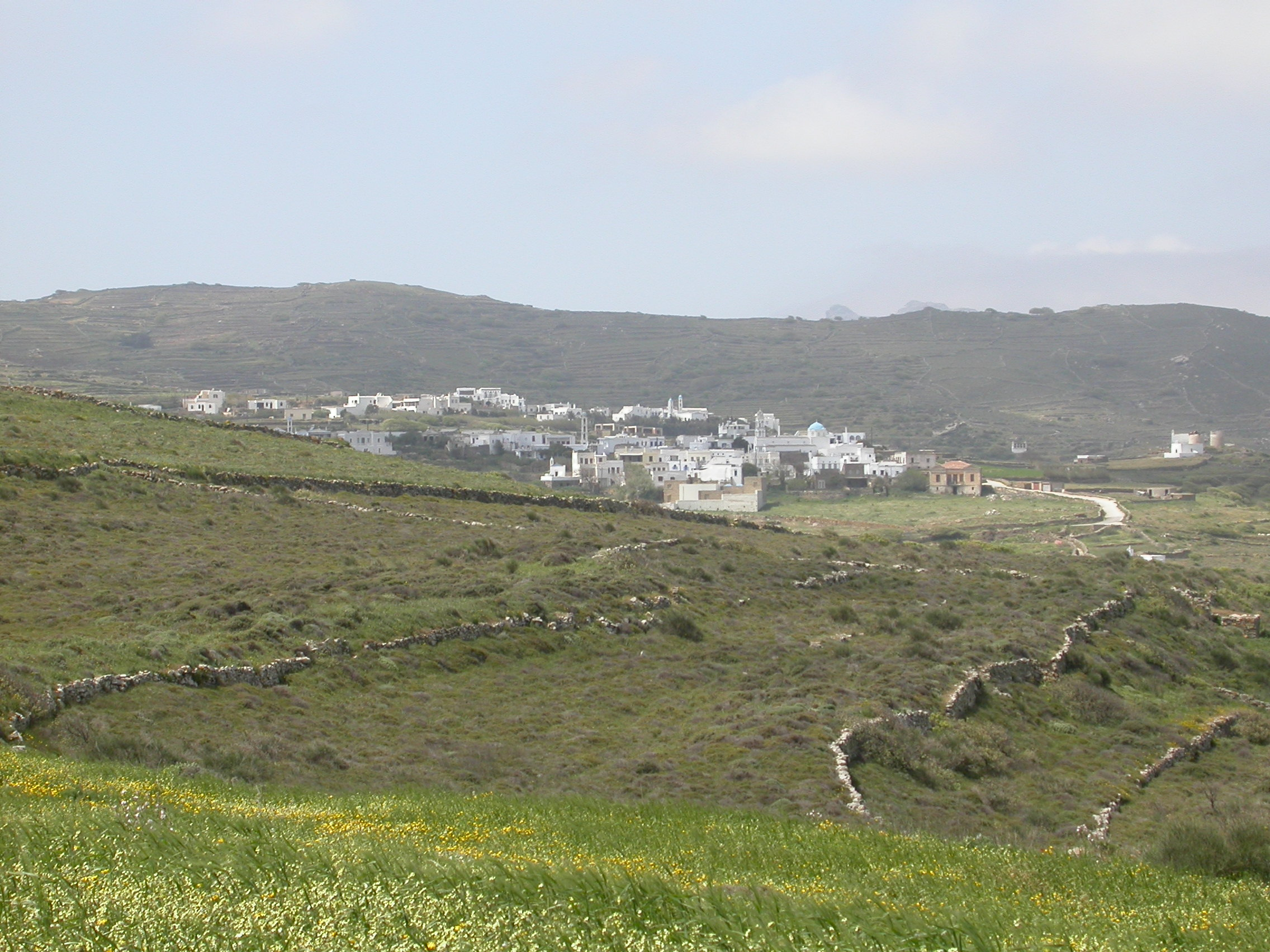
View of Tinos Kampos

Kampos is a community on the island Tinos, Cyclades, Greece. The community consists of the settlements Kampos, Agios Romanos, Vourni, Smardaki, Loutra, Xinara, Fsinos and Tarampados. Its population was 214 at the 2021 census.
