= Errikos Kontarinis =

Greek actor and cinematographer

- Born: 1906; Tinos, Greece
- Died: 1971 (aged 64–65)
- Occupation: Actor
- Spouse: Marika Nezer

Errikos Kontarinis (Greek: Ερρίκος Κονταρίνης; 1906–1971) was a Greek actor and cinematographer. He was born on the island of Tinos in 1906 and died on 11 September 1971. He was married to Marika Nezer.

== Filmography ==
Year	Film	Transliteration and translation	Role
1953	To soferaki	Το σωφεράκι (The Little Chauffeur)	-
1953	I ourano einai diki mas	Οι ουρανοί είναι δικοί μας	-
1955	Laterna, ftoheia kai filotimo	Λατέρνα, φτώχεια και φιλότιμο	-
1956	Grafeio synoikessimo	Γραφείο συνοικεσίων	father of Afroditi
1957	The Little Car	Το αμαξάκι (To amaxaki)	-
1957	Something is Burning	Κάτι να καίει (Kati na kei)	-
1964	To doloma	Το δόλωμα	-
1968	O kouklos	Ο κούκλος (The Doll/The Cutest)	-
1970	Ipolochagos Natassa	Υπολοχαγός Νατάσσα	-
1971	O kamarieris tis bouzouxous	Ο καμαριέρης της μπουζουξούς	Miltos
1972	The Countess of Corfu	Η κόμησσα της Κέρκυρας	-
1973	Polemistai tis eirinis	Πολεμισταί της ειρήνης	commander Stefanos Elpidakis
