= Lefteris Valakas =

Greek sculptor

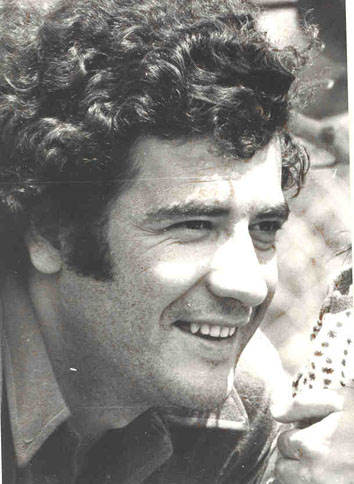
- Lefteris Valakas
- Born: 8 May 1944; Pyrgos, Tinos, Greece
- Died: 8 November 1982 (aged 38); Kavalourko, Tinos, Greece
- Education: School of Fine Arts of Pirgos; School of Fine Arts of Athens; École Nationale Supérieure des Beaux-Arts
- Known for: Sculpture, Graphic art

Lefteris (Eleftherios) Valakas (Greek: Λευτέρης (Ελευθέριος) Βαλάκας) (8 May 1944 – 8 November 1982) was a Greek sculptor. He was born in the village of Pyrgos on Tinos island in Greece. Valakas after concluding his basic education in Pyrgos, enrolled in the School of Fine Arts of Pyrgos. After graduating, he continued his studies in the respective school of Athens, Athens School of Fine Arts, for two years. After receiving scholarship by the Evangelistria Institution of Tinos, he concluded the studies in sculpture in the École Nationale Supérieure des Beaux-Arts in Paris.

Valakas had made many works across Greece and during the last years of his life, he worked in the reconstruction works of Acropolis of Athens.

He was married to Andromachi Karali and had three children Antonis, and the twins Costas and Nassos. Lefteris Valakas died unexpectedly on Tinos at the age of 38.

== Biography ==
1944: Lefteris Valakas is born on 8 May, on Saturday, in the village of Pyrgos in Tinos.

1956-1959: He studied Marble Art in Preliminary School of Fine Arts of Pyrgos.

1959-1964: He enrolled in the School of Fine Arts of Athens and studied sculpture by the professor Thanassis Apartis.

1965-1967: Valakas started creating personal works in marble, iron and copper. During his military service, he creates the super sized monument "Tsolias of '17" in the city of Arta.

1967-1969: He studied in École des Beaux-Arts in Paris by professor J. Yensesse. At the same time, he also takes courses in École pratique des hautes études by professor R. Martin. under scholarship of the Holly Foundation of Evanglelistria of Tinos. He exposes some of his work in the Salon d'Automne in Grand Palais.

1970: He came to Athens for permanent residence. He displayed many of his works in marble and copper in the stage of Fine Arts in Parnassos, in the 10th Panhellenic Artistic Movement and in many private galleries.

1971: He participated in the 11th Panhellenic artistic movement in Zappeion exposing many of his marble compositions. He also creates a number of mοnuments all over Greece and especially in Attica, Elis, Cyclades, Zakynthos, Achaea, Argolis and Corinthia.

1972: Valakas married Andromachi Karali and his first son, Antonis, is born. Meanwhile, he participates in the 4th New Artists Exposition held by the Hellenic American Union. He created the composition "Eleftheria" ("Liberty") in Kastro of Elis. In sequence, he makes an anaglyphs in many central buildings in the city of Athens.

1973: He displayed with other artists sculptured compositions in Hotel Hilton's hall of Arts, entitled "O Byzantios kai oi Neoi".

1974: He is occupied with personal research in various compositions and portraits.

1975: Lefteris Valakas participated in the 12th Panhellenic Exposition with various composition and the collection of "Kathedrika" ("Cathedrales"), in marble and brass.

1976: He executed the "Ancient Warrior" in brass in the city hall's square in the Municipality of Argyroupoli.

1977: Personal research in copper and iron. His twin sons, Costas and Nassos, are born.

1978: He participated in "Sculpture '78" exposition in Filothei and in the 2nd Outdoor Exposition of Modern Sculpture in the Conservatoire of Athens. He starts working in Ministry of Cultures in the field of classic antiquities conservation. He is also occupied with the monument conservation of Acropolis of Athens, Erechtheum, Theatre of Dionysus, Odeon of Herodes Atticus and the National Archaeological Museum of Athens.

1979: He participated in the exposition entitled "The child in modern sculpture" in the hall of the Conservatoire of Athens.

1980: He is occupied with the collection "Mikroperivallon" ("Micro-environment"). This collection is influenced by the cycladic architecture of the agricultural houses.

1981: Participated in the "Dimitria" exposition in Thessaloniki, organized by the Panhellenic Cultural Movement. He makes the monument of "Eleftheria" in the town of Kos. He also exposes four works of his "Mikroperivallon" collection in the 5th International Biennalle of sculpture in Budapest. He set in charge of the transfer of statue of Hermes to Goulandris Museum of Andros.

1982: He displayed, along with S. Triantis and A. Fanakides four compositions in marble and iron in the "Antinor" art hall. In addition, he participates in the festival of Municipality of Ilioupoli. Two of his works comprise the book cover of "Logotechniko Themelio". His work was presented in the Museum of Modern Arts of Ionas Vorres in the town of Peania. Lefteris Valakas died unexpectedly due to heart attack in November while hunting on the island of Tinos.

== Works ==
One of the most notable works of Lefteris Valakas is the monument of "Nike" (Greek: Nίκη) on the island of Kos, Dodecanese. It is located in the capital of the island near the port.
