= Haralambos Marmanis =

American author and executive (born 1970)

- Born: 1 January 1970 (age 56); Tinos, Greece
- Education: Brown University
- Scientific career
- Thesis: Analogy between the Electromagnetic and Hydrodynamic Equations: Application to Turbulence (2000)
- Doctoral advisor: George Karniadakis

Haralambos Marmanis (born 1970) is an American author and executive. He is the chief technology officer and vice president at the Copyright Clearance Center.

== Education ==
Marmanis received an MsC from the University of Illinois at Urbana-Champaign as well as a Ph.D. in applied mathematics from Brown University supervised by George Karniadakis.

== Career ==
Marmanis developed the Marmanis-form of the Lamb transport equations, first published in a 1998 paper. He was also the founder of Sofia Tech, and worked at Truexchange as well as Zeborg. He later became the Chief Technology Officer of Emptoris. He then joined Copyright Clearance Center as the Chief Technology Officer and Vice President of Engineering. Marmanis has published peer-reviewed articles, as well as the books Spend Analysis: The Window into Strategic Sourcing and Algorithms of the Intelligent Web. His work has included research into the behaviour of fluids in the context of electromagnetic theory.
