= Kabos =

Kabos is a surname. Notable people with the surname include:

- Eduard Kabos (1864–1923), Hungarian journalist, dramatist and writer
- Endre Kabos (1906–1944), Hungarian sabre fencer
- Gyula Kabos (1887–1941), Hungarian actor and comedian
- Ilona Kabos (1893–1973), Hungarian-British pianist and teacher

== See also ==
- 180824 Kabos, Asteroid
