= Christoph Neeser =

Bavarian-Greek officer

Christoph Neeser (Greek: Χριστόφορος Νέζερ; (1808-1883) was a Bavarian officer who settled in Greece. He arrived in the country in 1833 in the expeditionary corps that accompanied Prince Otto, Greece's first king. In mid-March of the same year, as a lieutenant, he was appointed head of the Athens guard. On 1 April, together with the Bavarian Major Paligan, he received the keys of the Acropolis of Athens from its last Ottoman commandant, Osman Efendi.

He married twice with Greek women and had 26 children. Of his grandchildren, the most notable were actress Marika Nezer and two further who bore his name, a cousin and a brother of Marika. He also wrote a memoir titled The First Years of the Foundation of the Greek Kingdom.
