= Marika Nezer =

Greek actress

- Born: 1906; Constantinople, Ottoman Empire (now Istanbul, Turkey)
- Died: 18 July 1989 (aged 82–83); Athens, Greece
- Occupation: Actress
- Spouse: Errikos Kontarinis

Marika Nezer (Greek: Μαρίκα Νέζερ; 1906 – 18 July 1989) was a Greek actress. She was the daughter of Konstantinos Nezer, sister of Christoforos Nezer (1903–1995) and cousin of Christoforos Nezer (1887–1970) and granddaughter of Christoforos Nezer, fort chief of Athens and an aide-de-camp of King Otto of Greece.

== Biography ==
She entered the theatrical scene at the age of 13 in Cairo, where she excelled mainly in musical revue performances. She also distinguished herself in Greece in revue productions and in the companies of Sofia Vembo, with the characteristic style of a ‘‘characterist’’.

Until an advanced age, she appeared in several films. She was married to the actor Errikos Kontarinis. She died on 18 July 1989 in Athens and was buried in Vyronas.
