= Exomvourgo =

Mountain in Greece

- Exobourgo, Xobourgo
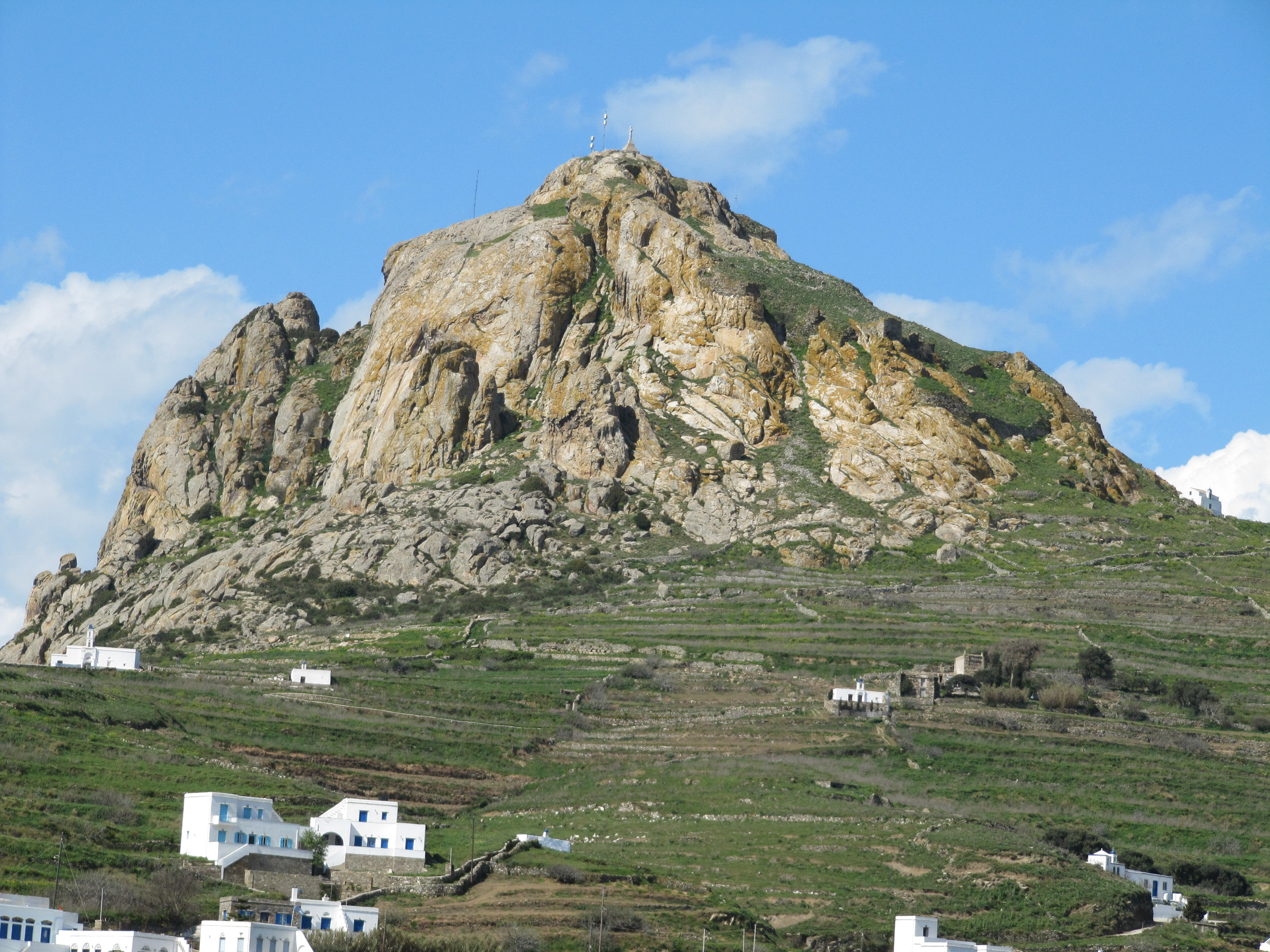
- Exomvourgo in 2010

Highest point
- Elevation: 641 m
- Coordinates: 37°34′38″N 25°10′3″E

Geography
- Location within Greece
- Location: Tinos

Exomvourgo or Exobourgo (Greek: Εξώμβουργο/Εξώμπουργκο, pronounced [eˈksomvurɣo]/[eˈksoburɡo]) is a mountain on the island of Tinos. Unlike the other mountains in the Cyclades, it has a rugged appearance and is the site of a ruined Venetian fortress and town.

Exomvourgo is not the highest mountain on the island—that is Tsiknias—but is in a central location ringed by many small villages such as Tripotamos and Falatados and can be climbed from several of these. The walk up from Iera Kardia Iisou takes around 20 minutes. The former Exomvourgos municipality shares its name with the mountain.

== Ancient history ==
Remains dating from the Copper Age have been found near Exomvourgo and Geometric period and 5-6th century BC remains have been found at archaeological excavations at the mountain's southern foot including a temple of Demeter. A large wall from an Ionian town dating from 1100 BC is sited southwest of Exomvourgo. In the fourth century BC the island's administrative centre moved back from Exomvourgo to the coast.

== Fortress and town ==
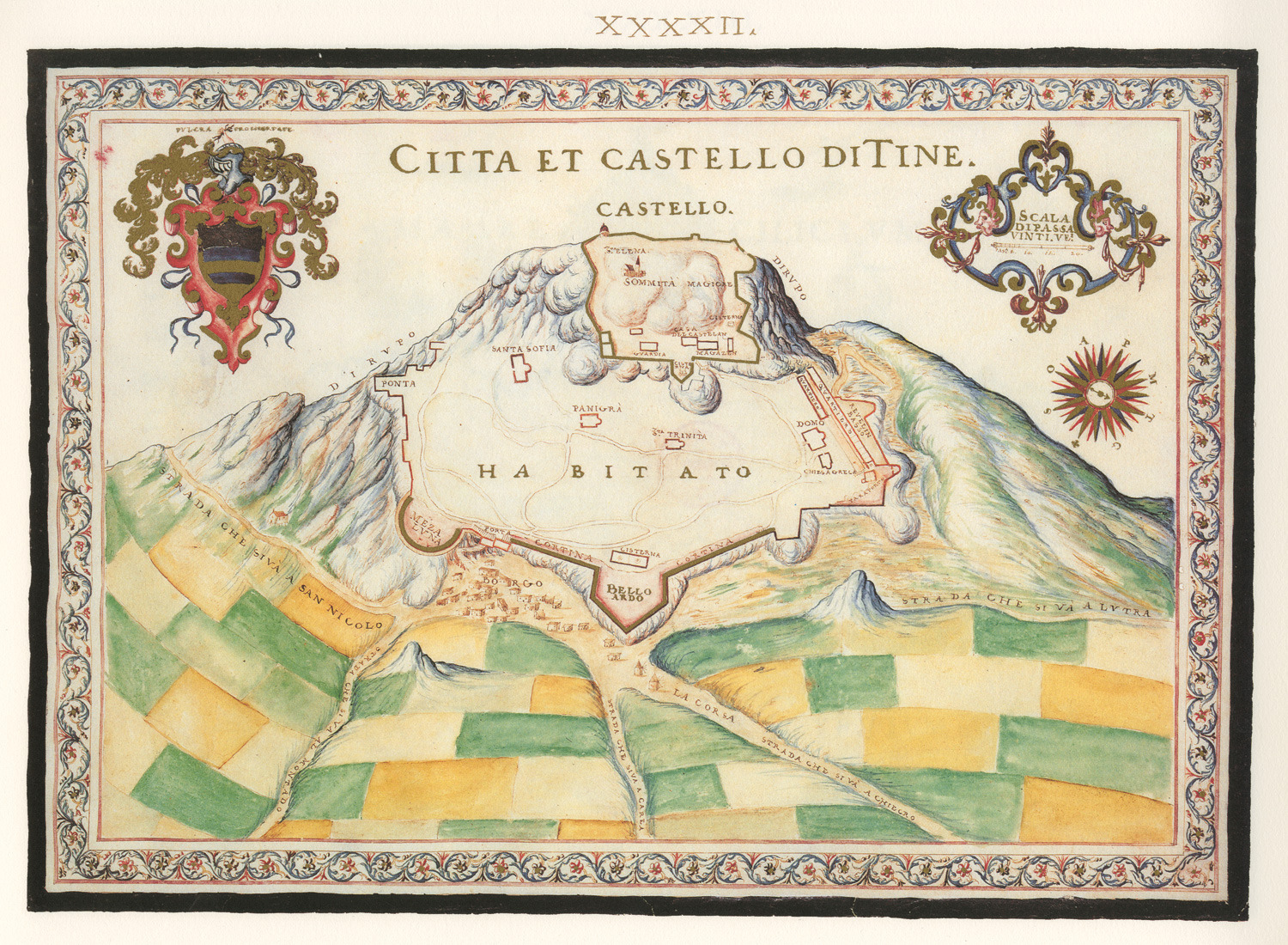
Tinos city and castle by Francesco Basilicata in 1618

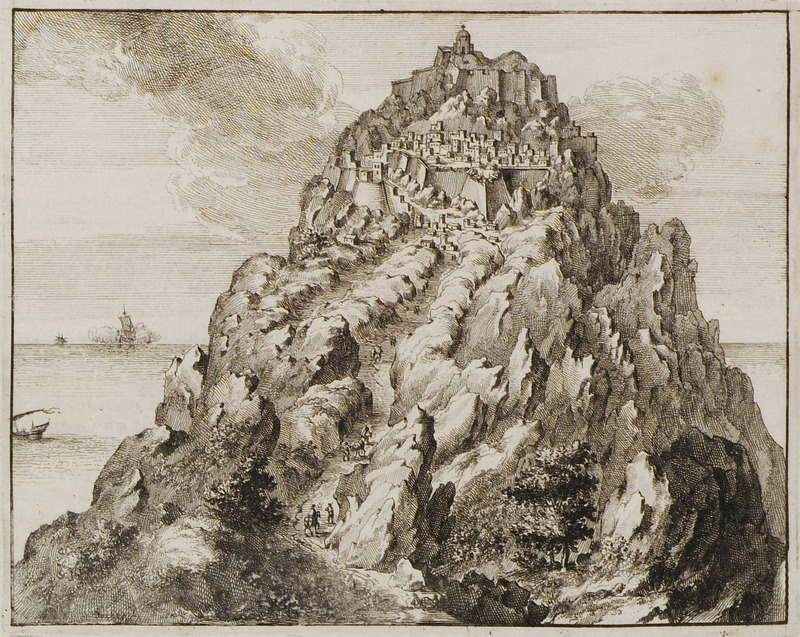
Illustration of the citadel on Tinos by Olfert Dapper in 1703

Under Byzantine rule a fortress, later named by the Venetians Castello di Santa Elena after a chapel on the summit, was built on the mountain and Exomvourgo functioned as the island's capital.

The mountain was the site of a fortress and town functioning as the administrative centre of the island from 1207 when the island, along with Andros, Skiathos, Skopelos and Skyros became a fiefdom of the Venetian brothers Jeremie and Andre Ghisi following the partition of the Byzantine Empire after the fall of Constantinople during the Fourth Crusade.

In 1390, after the death of Batholomew III Ghisi,^{1} the Venetian Republic assumed direct control and further fortified the mountain. The island fell to the Ottoman admiral Hayreddin Barbarossa in 1537 but was recaptured by the Venetians in 1538. The fortress was then further expanded until it featured 600 m long ramparts and towers facing in all directions. In this era the town inside the castle had a population of 1000-2000 and contained 677 houses, 5 churches and some storage areas and reservoirs.

In 1570 a force of 8,000 Ottoman troops and several cannons, commanded by Canum Pasha, besieged the mountain, but were successfully repulsed. Further failed attempts to capture the fortress were made in 1655, 1658, 1661, and 1684. By 1700 the fortifications were not in a good state and the fortress was only manned by 14 soldiers. The Venetians remained in charge until 1715 during the last Ottoman–Venetian war when, long after the rest of the Cyclades had fallen to the Turks, it was besieged by a Turkish force of 65 warships and 74 transports carrying 25,000 soldiers. Despite the fortress being regarded as unconquerable and seeming secure against the invaders the commander of the fortress negotiated terms and surrendered. The terms allowed all the Venetians on the island to leave with the Greeks forced to stay. The commander and his officers were accused of "treason after bribery" by the Venetian Republic and sentenced to death by swallowing liquid silver/having liquid silver poured on their bodies Bernardo Balbi the rector (governor) of the island, was transferred to Venice and sentenced to life imprisonment for cowardice. The Ottomans almost completely dismantled the fortress and the town inside it within a period of 3 days.

The town on the mountain was previously known as Tinos (Tine or Tino to the Venetians) with the current town of Tinos previously known as San Nicolò. The name Exomvourgo derives from the Greek exo apo to bourgo meaning "outside the burg".

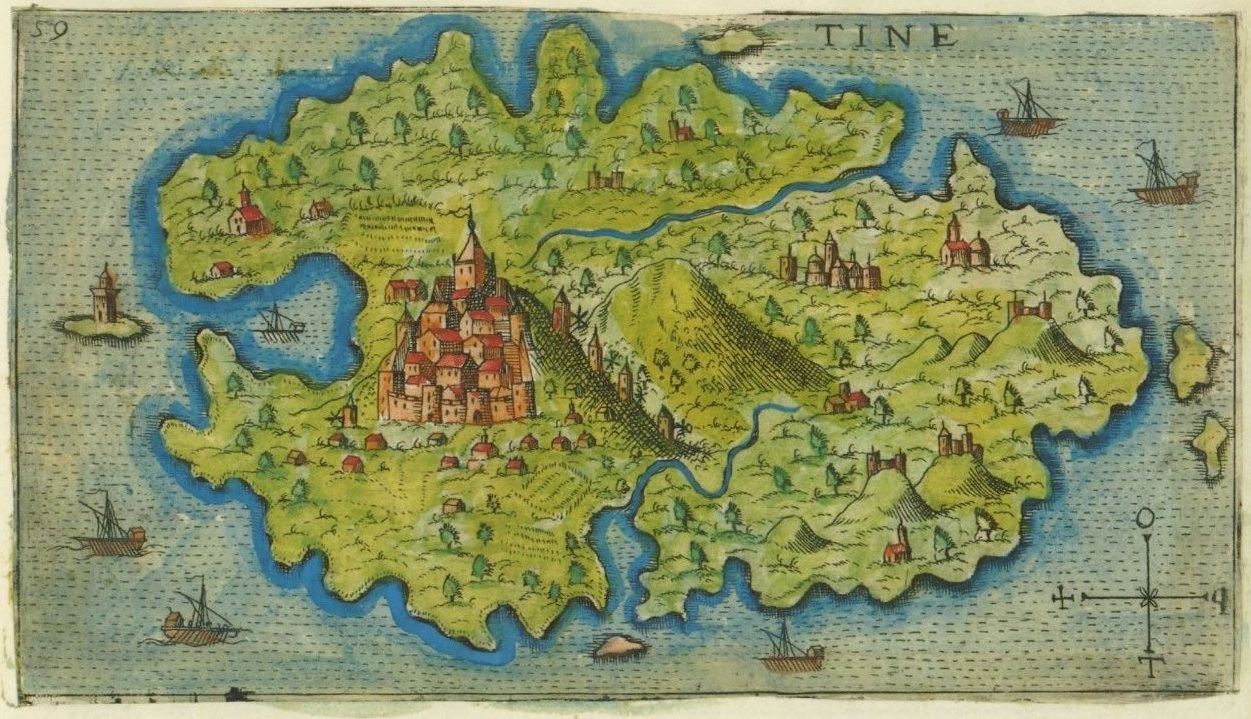
Map of the island of Tinos created in 1597 by the Venetian Giacomo (Jacomo) Franco showing the citadel

== Sacred Heart of Jesus ==
The church of Iera Kardia Iisou (Sacred Heart of Jesus) is on the slopes of the mountain, it is now a Catholic monastery. The church has a complicated history: originally the Cathedral of Saint Sofia stood within the walls of the fortress but after its destruction the Jesuit monks moved into a small church outside the walls and began to build a larger church next door. This was finished in 1725 and also dedicated to Saint Sofia. The Jesuits later left the church and it fell into disrepair. In 1895 the church was restored and renamed the Sacred Heart of Jesus. Today the church is a site of pilgrimage and hosts visitors from around the world.

== See also ==
- List of Jesuit sites

== Notes ==
1.Other references state this was after an intermediate period under George III
