= Tinos (town) =

Tinos Τήνος
- Municipal unit
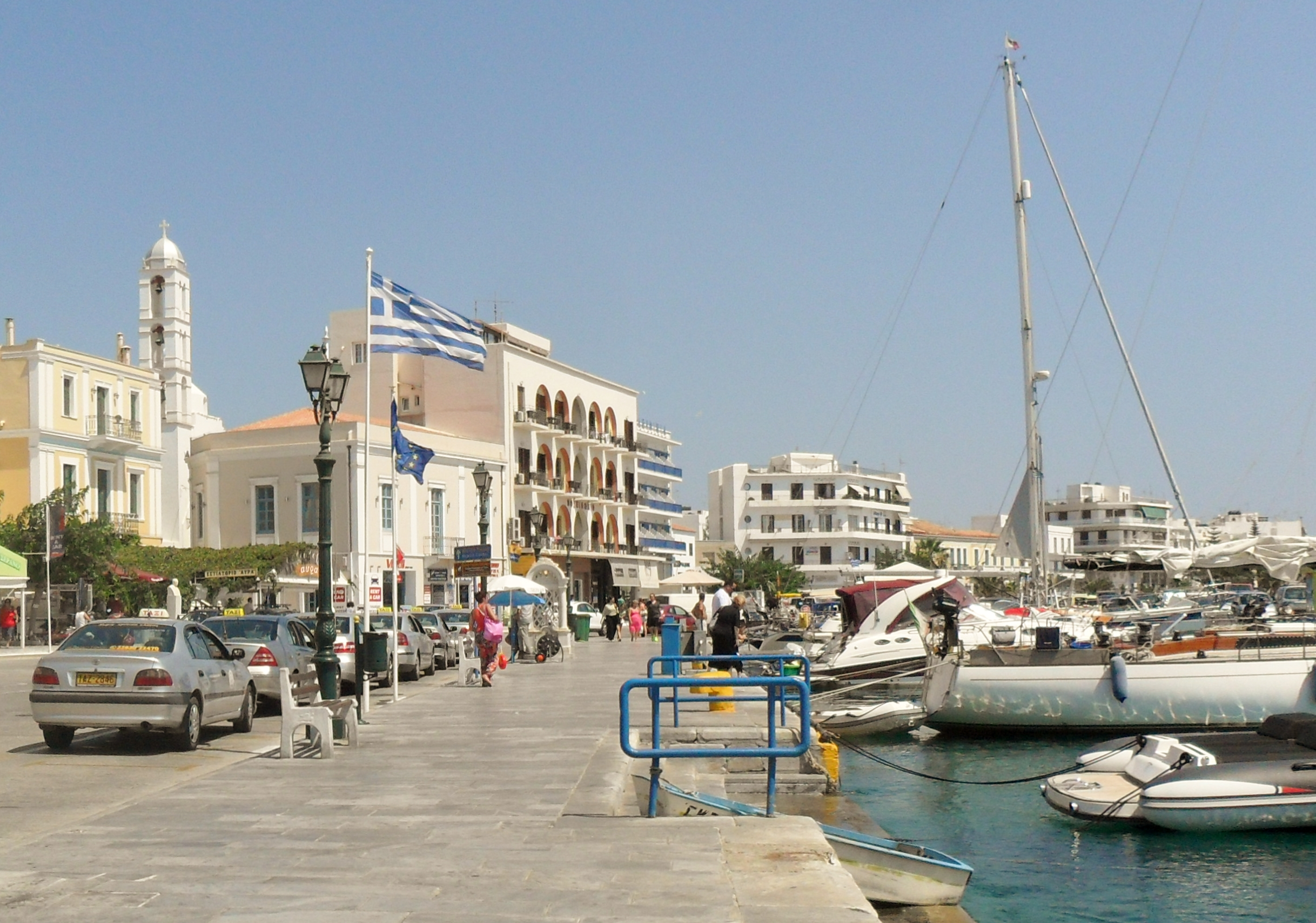
- View of the promenade

- Location within Tinos

- Location within Greece
- Coordinates: 37°32′N 25°10′E
- Country: Greece
- Administrative region: South Aegean
- Regional unit: Tinos
- Municipality: Tinos

Area
  - Municipal unit: 22.9 km^{2} (8.8 sq mi)

Population (2021)
  - Municipal unit: 6,092
  - Municipal unit density: 266/km^{2} (689/sq mi)
  - Community: 5,111
- Time zone: UTC+2 (EET)
  - Summer (DST): UTC+3 (EEST)
- Vehicle registration: EM

Tinos (Greek: Τήνος) is a town on the island of Tinos, in the Cyclades, Greece. It is also locally known as Chora (Χώρα) as is common in the Cyclades for island main towns.

Tinos Town is the site of the Church of Panagia Evangelistria, a site of pilgrimage for Greeks and the town has many businesses that revolve around pilgrims' needs.

Since the 2011 local government reform it is part of the municipality Tinos, of which it is the seat and a municipal unit. The municipal unit has an area of 22.873 km^{2}. It shares the island of Tinos with the municipal units of Exomvourgo and Panormos.

Tinos is the largest town on the island and has been the administrative capital since the destruction of the former town and fortress of Tinos on the mountain Exobourgo. The current town was formerly known as San Nicolò.

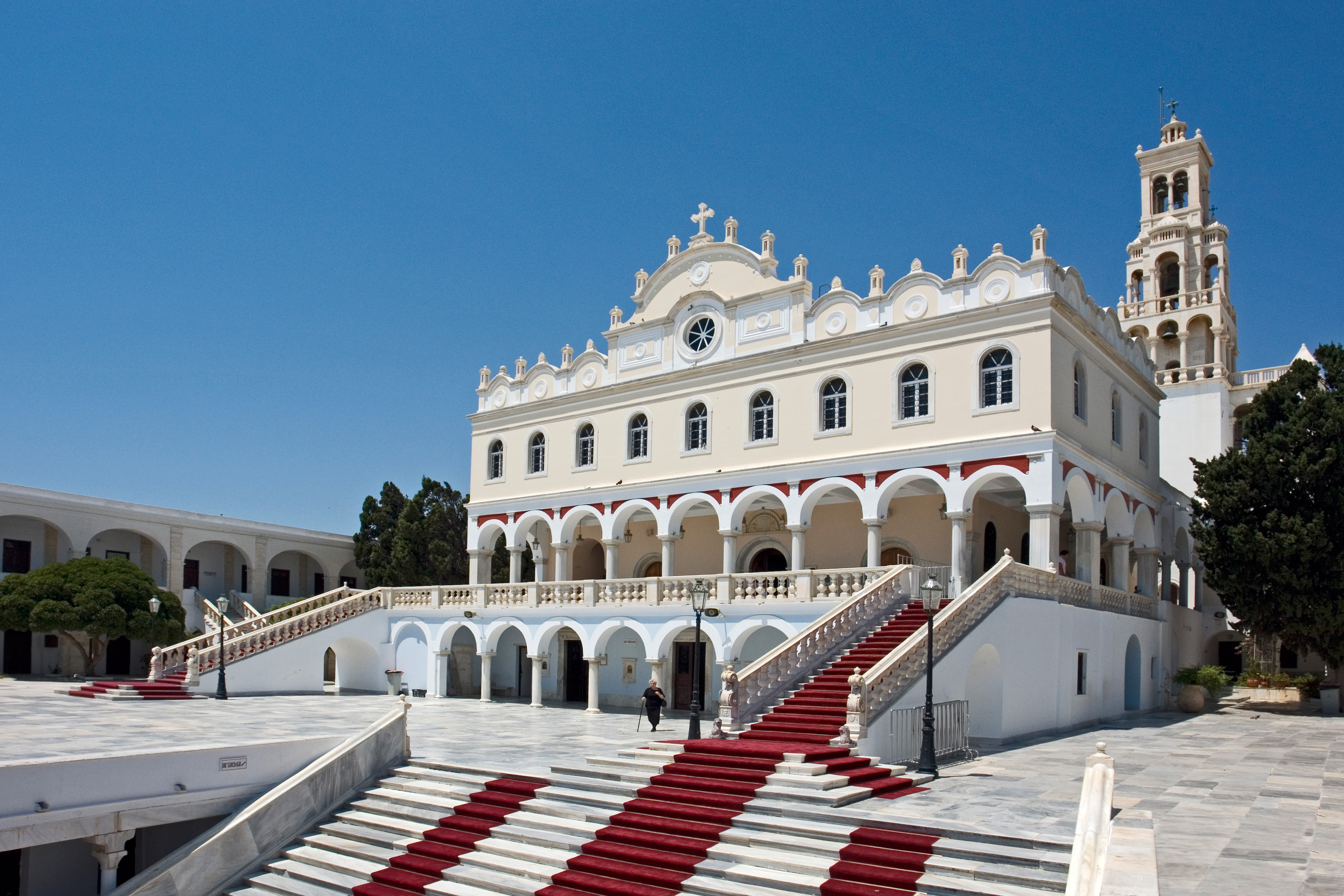
The Church of Panagia Evangelistria, a major site of pilgrimage for Greeks.

== Historical population ==
Year	Town population	Municipal unit population
1981	4,049	4,499
1991	3,754	-
2001	4,394	5,203
2011	4,762	5,744
2021	5,111	6,092
