= Tinos =

Tinos Περιφερειακή ενότητα / Δήμος Τήνου
- Regional unit and municipality
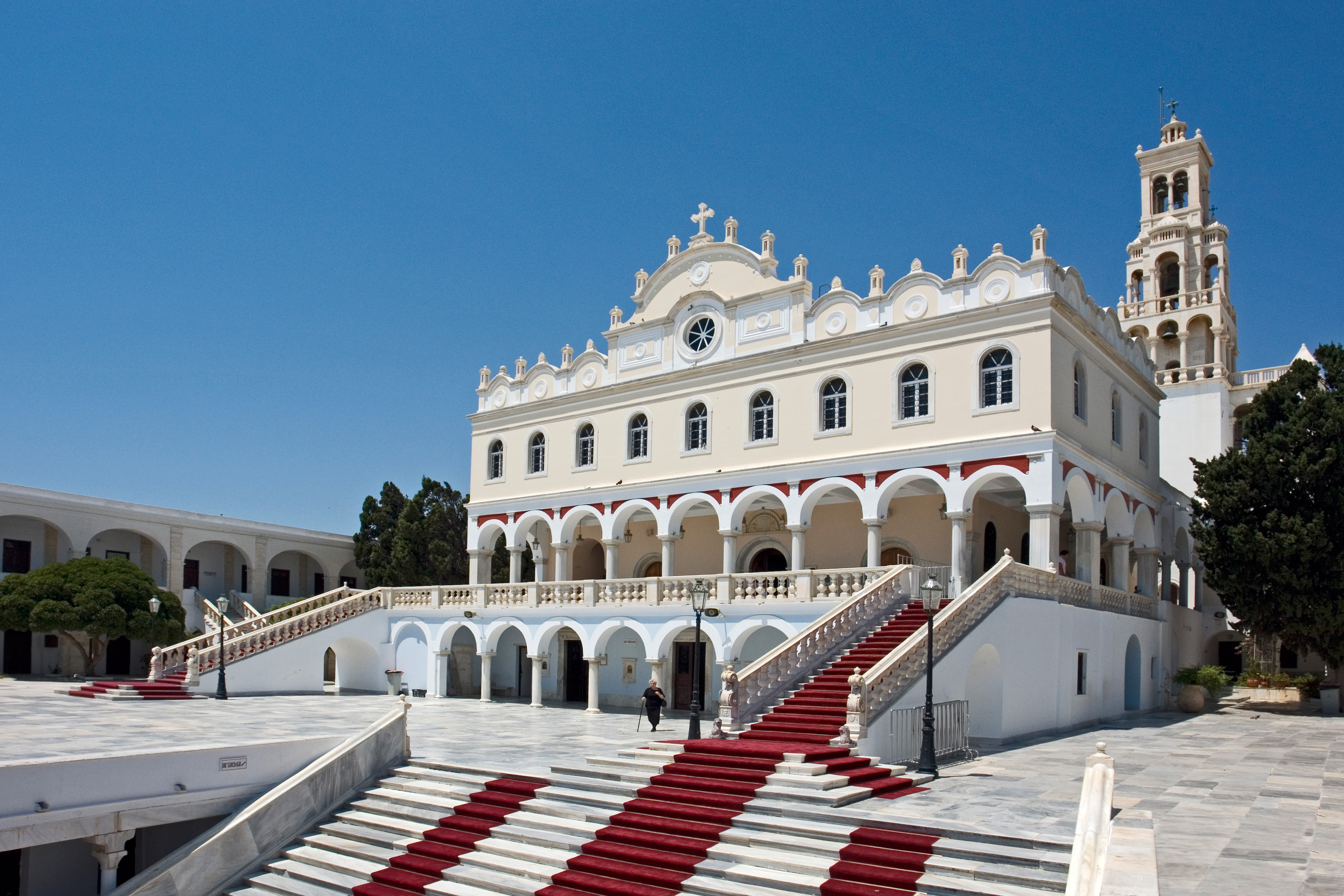
- Panagia Evangelistria, landmark of the island

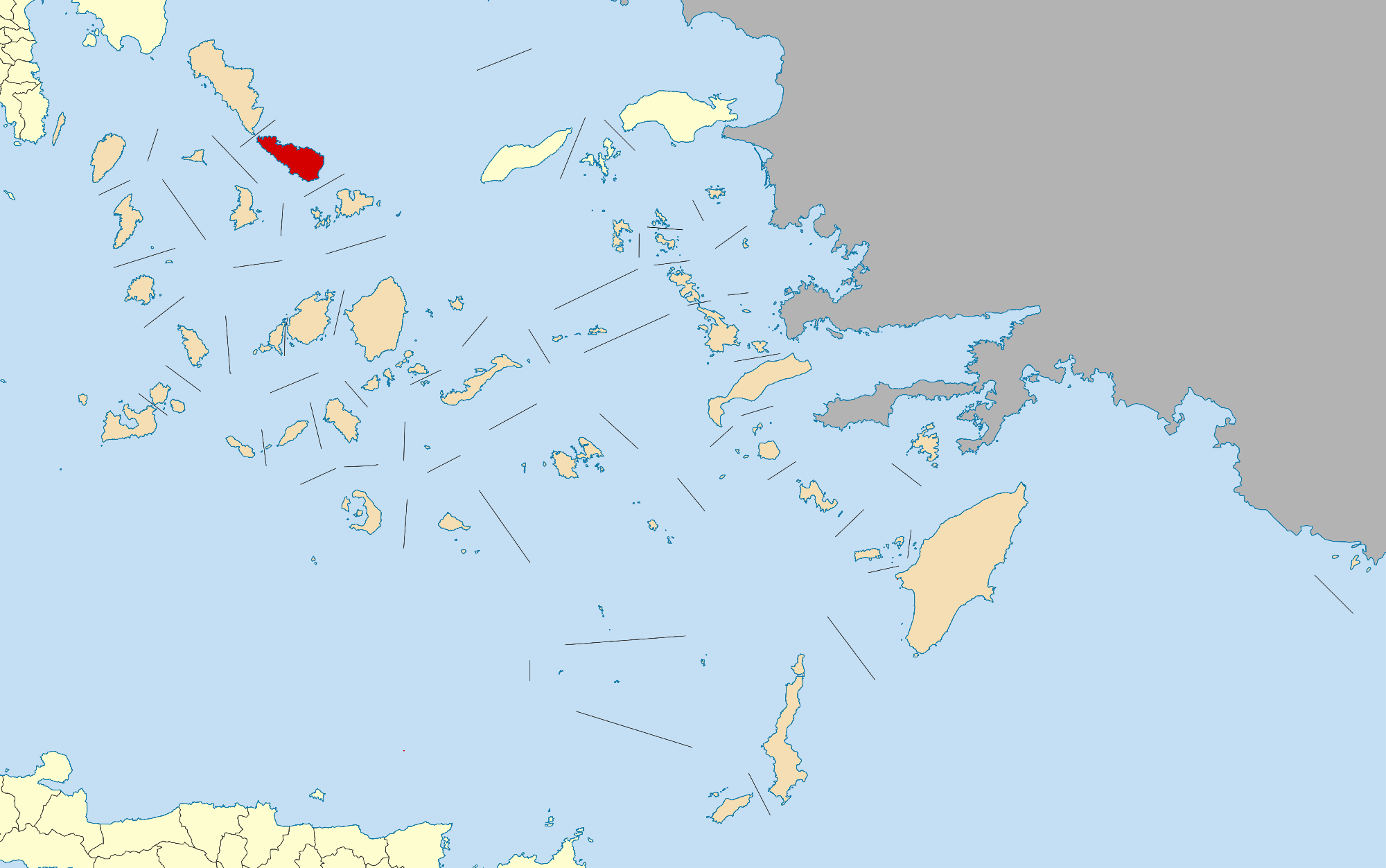
- Tinos within the South Aegean

- Location within Greece
- Coordinates: 37°37′N 25°08′E
- Country: Greece
- Administrative region: South Aegean
- Seat: Tinos (town)

Area
  - Municipality: 194.5 km^{2} (75.1 sq mi)

Population (2021)
  - Municipality: 8,934
  - Density: 45.93/km^{2} (119.0/sq mi)
- Time zone: UTC+2 (EET)
  - Summer (DST): UTC+3 (EEST)
- Postal code: 842 xx
- Area code: 22830
- Vehicle registration: EM
- Website: www.tinos.gr

Tinos (Greek: Τήνος [ˈtinos]) is a Greek island situated in the Aegean Sea. It forms part of the Cyclades archipelago. The closest islands are Andros, Delos, and Mykonos. It has a land area of 194.464 square kilometres (75.083 sq mi) and a 2021 census population of 8,934 inhabitants.

Tinos is famous amongst Greeks for the Church of Panagia Evangelistria, for the island's 80 or so windmills, for about 1,000 artistic dovecotes, for 50 active villages and for the Venetian fortifications on the mountain Exomvourgo. On Tinos, both Greek Orthodox and Catholic populations coexist, and the island is also well known for its sculptors and painters, such as Nikolaos Gysis, Yannoulis Chalepas and Nikiforos Lytras.

The island is located near the geographical center of the Cyclades islands complex, and because of the Panagia Evangelistria church, with the reputedly miraculous icon of Virgin Mary that it holds, Tinos is also the center of a yearly pilgrimage that takes place on the date of the Dormition of the Virgin Mary (15 August, Greek: Dekapentavgoustos). Many pilgrims make their way along the 800 metres (2,600 feet) from the ferry wharf to the church on their hands and knees as a sign of devotion.

== History ==
Anciently, the island was called Tenos (Ancient Greek: Τῆνος), and was also called Hydroussa/Hydroessa (Ὑδροῦσσα, Ὑδρόεσσα) from the number of its springs, and Ophioussa (Ὀφιοῦσσα) because it abounded in snakes. The sons of Boreas are said to have been slain in this island by Heracles. In the invasion of Greece by Xerxes I, the Tenians were compelled to serve in the Persian fleet; but a Tenian trireme deserted to the Greeks immediately before the Battle of Salamis (480 BCE), and accordingly the name of the Tenians was inscribed upon the tripod at Delphi in the list of Grecian states which had overthrown the Persians. Pausanias relates that the name of the Tenians was also inscribed on the statue of Zeus at Olympia among the Greeks who had fought at the Battle of Plataea. The Tenians afterwards formed part of the Delian League, and are mentioned among the subject allies of Athens at the time of the Sicilian expedition. They paid a yearly tribute of 3600 drachmae, from which it may be inferred that they enjoyed a considerable share of prosperity. Alexander of Pherae took possession of Tenos for a time; and the island was afterwards granted by Marcus Antonius to the Rhodians.

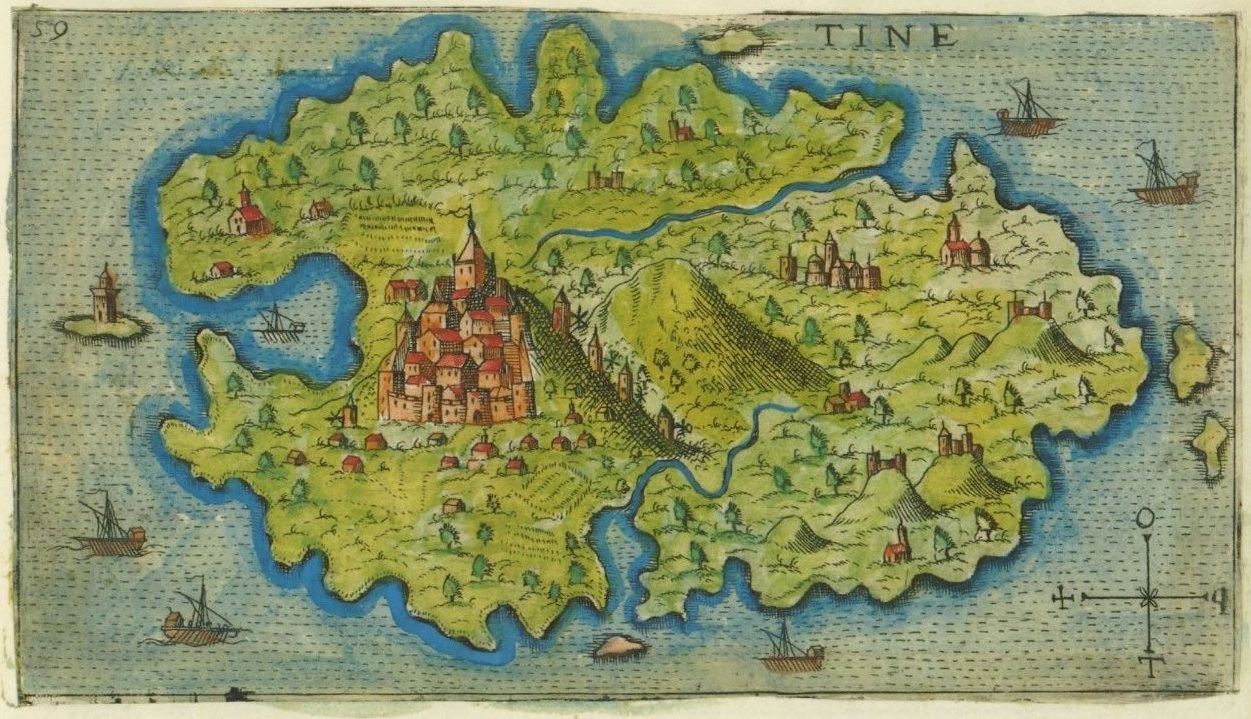
Map of Tinos by Giacomo Franco (1597)

Following the capture of Constantinople by the Fourth Crusade, Tinos was one of several islands ruled by private Venetian citizens and belonged to Andrea Ghisi, whose heirs held it until 1390 when the last member of the family branch bequeathed both Tinos and Mykonos to Venice. It was ruled by Venice until 1715, when Tinos was captured by the Ottoman Empire (see Ottoman–Venetian War). It was known as İstendil during Ottoman era. The Ottomans held Tinos until 1821 when the inhabitants joined in the Greek War of Independence.

The tumult of the period gave rise to an increase in piracy in the region. In 1825 HMS Cambrian was the lead vessel of a small squadron in anti-piracy operations in the Archipelago, at Alexandria, and around the coasts of Syria. On 27 July 1826, Cambrian's boats captured a pirate bombard and burnt a mistico on Tinos. Five pirates were killed and several wounded.

The date of 15 August also commemorates the 1940 sinking in Tinos's harbour of the Greek cruiser Elli, during peacetime, while she rode at anchor, by the Italian submarine Delfino. The Elli was participating in the celebrations of the Feast of the Dormition. One of the three torpedoes fired hit the Elli under the one operating boiler and she caught fire and sank. Nine petty officers and sailors were killed and 24 were wounded. The same submarine attempted to torpedo the passenger ships M/V Elsi and M/V Hesperos anchored in the port. This attempt failed and the torpedoes only damaged a section of the port's wharf.

== Geography ==
Satellite image of Tinos

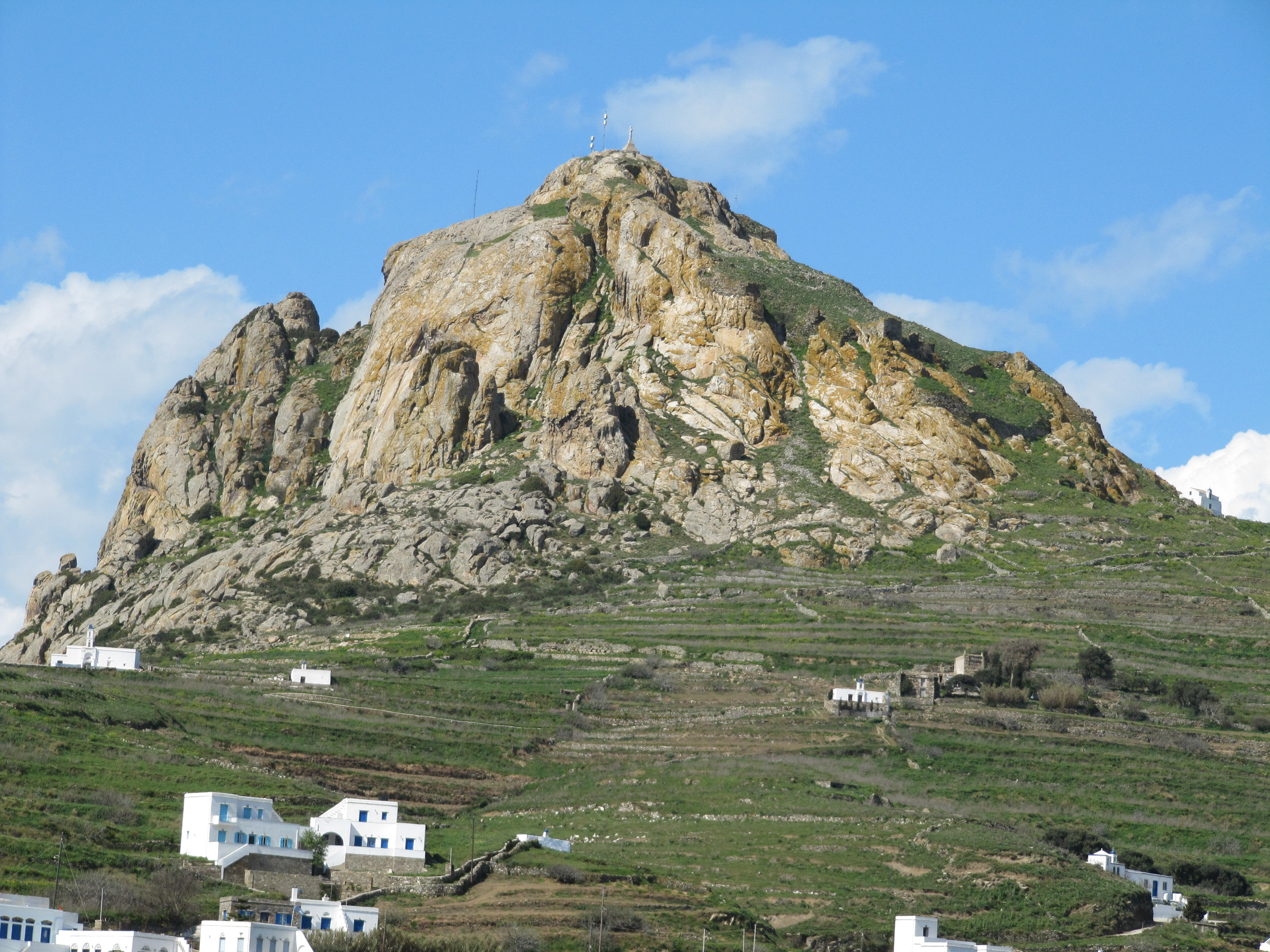
Exomvourgo

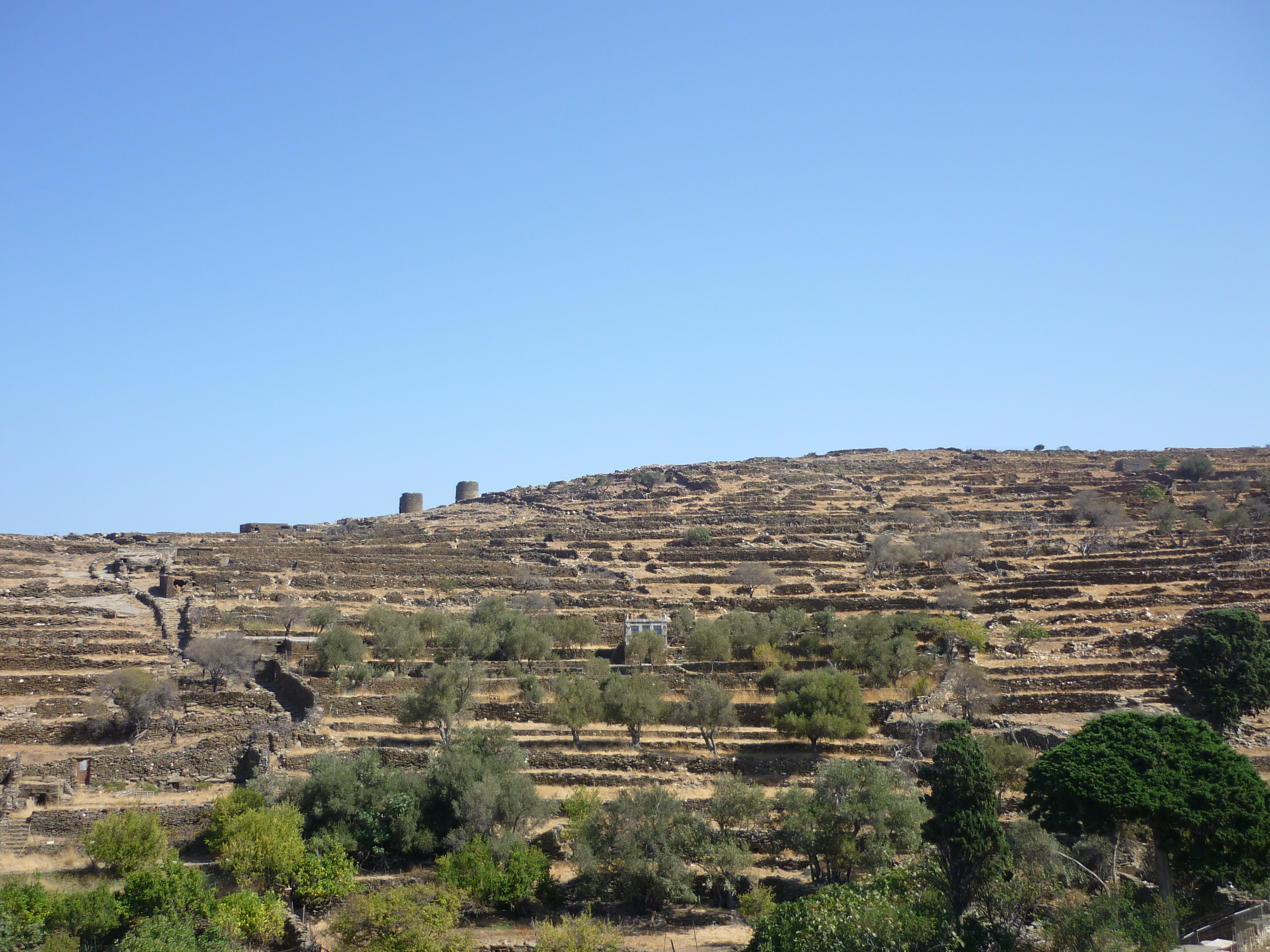
Landscape of the island

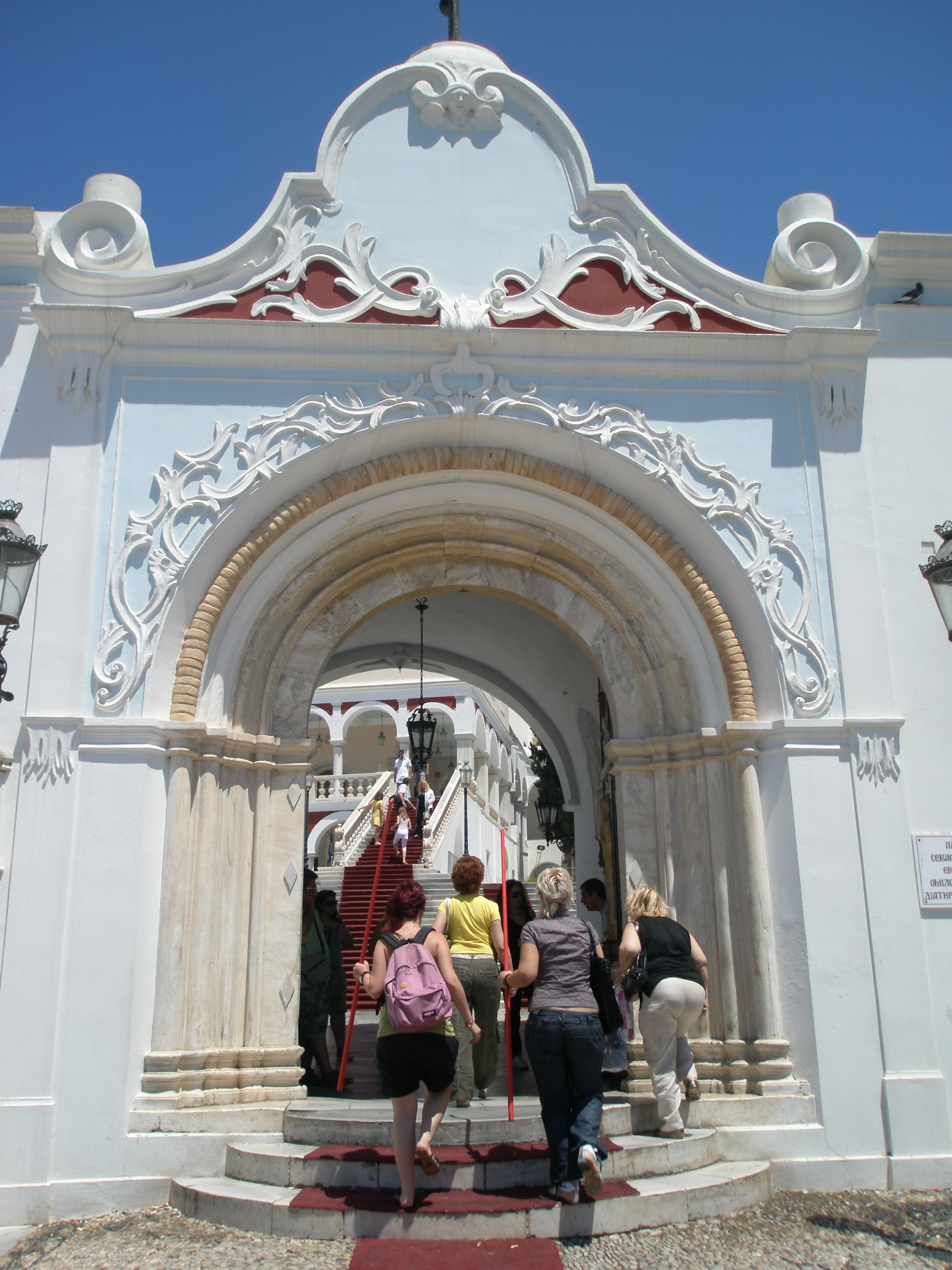
The entrance of the church

Tinos has a varied landscape. From the shores of Panormos and Kolimbithra on the North Shore to Kionia, Agios Yannis O Portos, and Agios Sostis on the Southern Shore, Tinos has many beaches. Tsiknias is the highest mountain on the island at 750 metres (2,460 feet) and hides the village of Livada. The mountain of Exobourgo is quite distinct, and unlike its more rounded Cycladic neighbors, has a jagged appearance that would be more at home in the Alps. Between Tsiknias and Exobourgo lies the fruitful plain of Falatados. This area is unique on the island as its relatively flat terrain (albeit with an elevation of about 300 metres (980 feet)) is rare on the island. This made it a strong candidate for a proposed airport on the island. The Meltemi winds and concerns of local villagers of the towns of Falatados, and Steni have all but halted the project.

The landscape around Volax is surreal and unusual with giant boulders some the size of multi-storey buildings. The village of Volax lies at the center of this landscape. To the west, the mountains surrounding Pyrgos contain green marble.

All around the island of Tinos, the islanders have made the most unusual things out of stone. The hills are all terraced with stone walls and every village is connected to its nearest neighbors by stone walkways set between a parallel set of stone walls.

The island's mineral resources include marble, Verde antico, asbestos and a granite mine near Volax (also known as Volakas).

== Administration ==
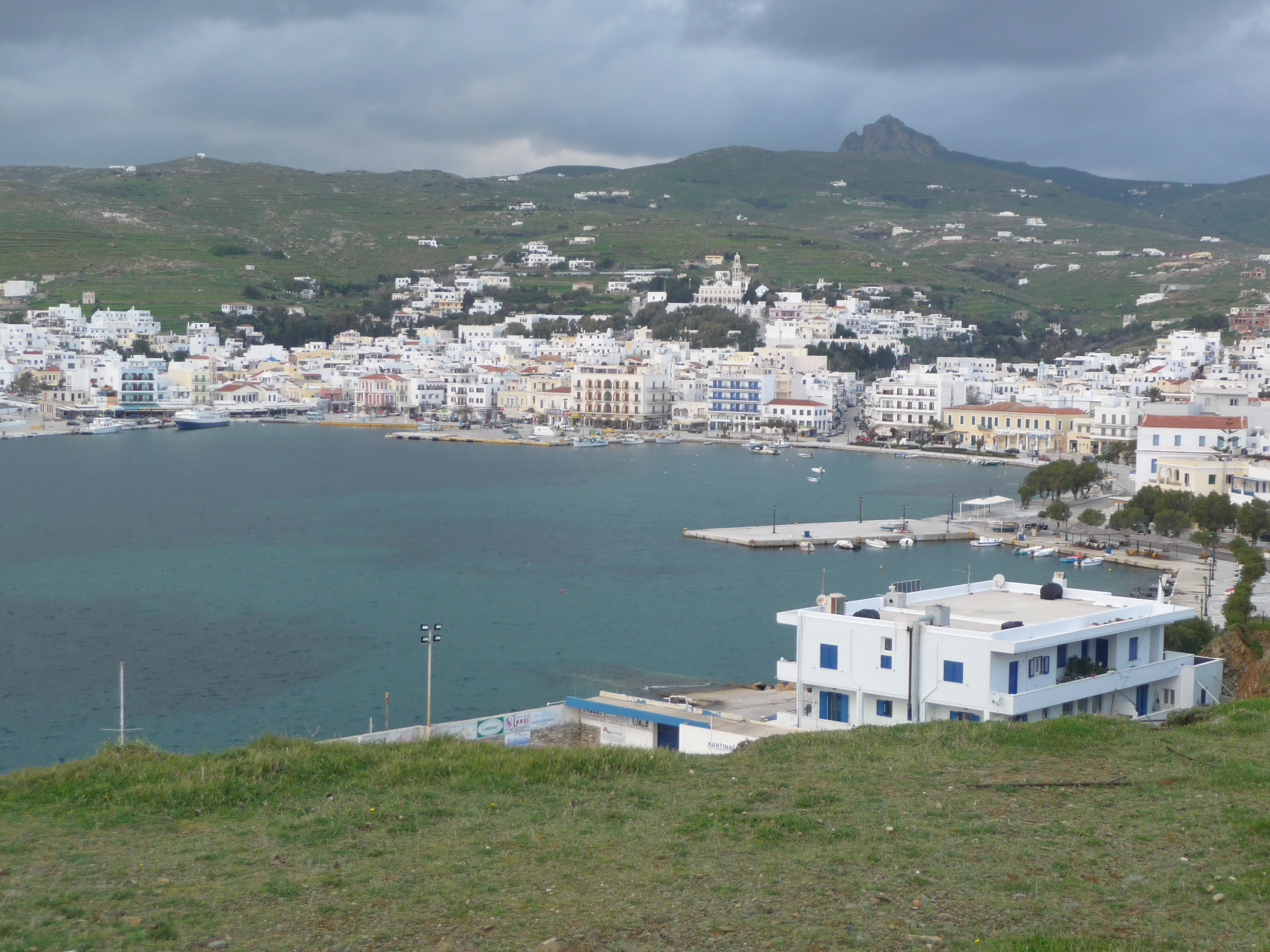
View of the town of Tinos

Tinos is a separate regional unit of the South Aegean region, and the only municipality of the regional unit. As a part of the 2011 Kallikratis government reform, the regional unit Tinos was created out of part of the former Cyclades Prefecture. At the same reform, the current municipality Tinos was created out of the three former municipalities:

- Exomvourgo
- Panormos
- Tinos (town)

=== Province ===
The province of Tinos (Greek: Επαρχία Τήνου) was one of the provinces of the Cyclades Prefecture. It had the same territory as the present regional unit. It was abolished in 2006.

== Election Results ==
=== Parliamentary ===
2000

2004

2007

2009

5/2012

6/2012

1/2015

9/2015

2019

5/2023

6/2023

=== European ===
2009

2014

2024

== Climate ==
Tinos experiences a Mediterranean climate and has warm and dry summers and mild and wet winters. In the island you come across the etesians (also known as meltemi winds) — the strong, dry north winds of the Aegean Sea, which blow from about mid-May to mid-September. They are at their strongest in the afternoon and often die down at night, but sometimes meltemi winds last for days without a break. Meltemi winds are dangerous to sailors because they come up in clear weather without warning and can blow at 7-8 Beaufort.

Month	Jan	Feb	Mar	Apr	May	Jun	Jul	Aug	Sep	Oct	Nov	Dec
High	14 °C	15 °C	16 °C	19 °C	22 °C	26 °C	28 °C	28 °C	26 °C	23 °C	19 °C	15 °C
Low	10 °C	10 °C	11 °C	13 °C	17 °C	21 °C	23 °C	24 °C	21 °C	19 °C	15 °C	12 °C
Precipitation	8	7	5	5	3	0	0	0	2	2	6	11
Winds in km/h	29	30	26	20	21	23	23	26	23	26	23	28

== Transportation ==
Tinos has three ports, one for passenger speed boats, and two for ferries and highspeed boats which carry passengers and cars to other ports, including Mykonos (35 min), Piraeus, Rafina, Andros and Syros.

There is a heliport close to Aghios Fokas beach, some 2 kilometres (1 mile) from the town of Tinos.

There are regular buses linking the town of Tinos with other villages on the island.

== Towns and villages ==
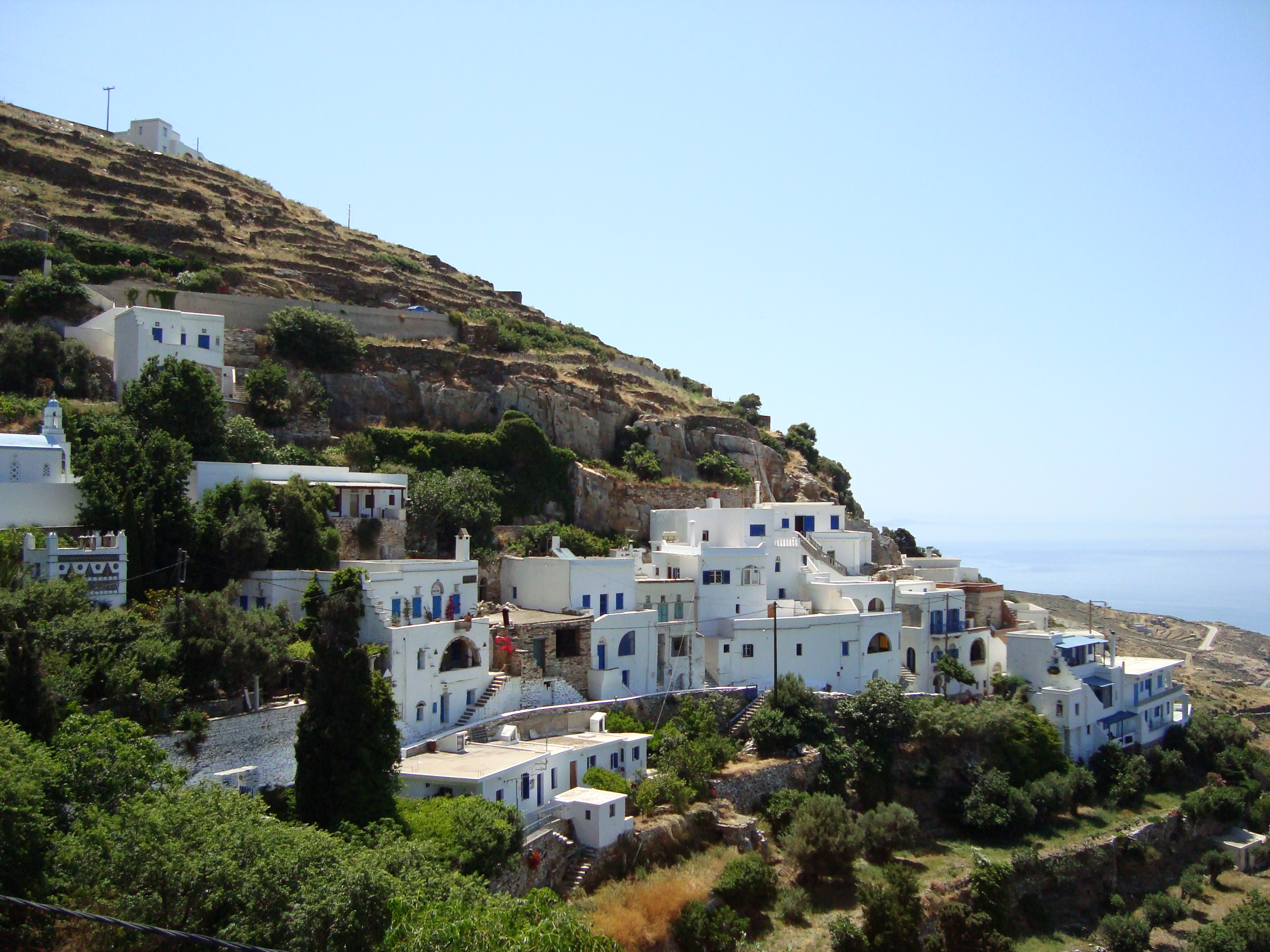
The village of Kardiani

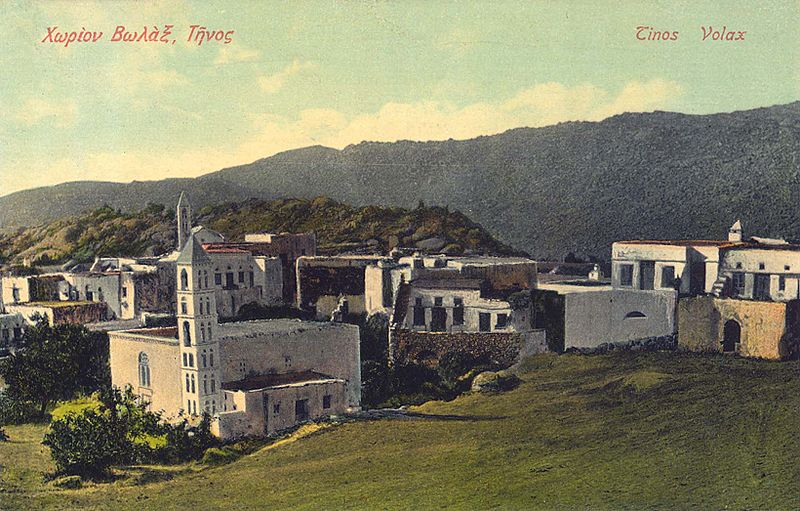
The village of Volax, postcard from 1907

- Aetopholia
- Agapi
- Agia Varvara
- Agios Fokas
- Agios Romanos
- Agios Sostis
- Arnados
- Berdemiaros
- Chatzirados
- Dyo-Choria
- Falatados
- Fero Chorio
- Kabos
- Kaki Skala
- Kalloni
- Kampos
- Kardiani
- Karkados
- Karya
- Kato Kleisma
- Kechros
- Kionia
- Komi
- Koumaros
- Koumelas
- Krokos
- Ktikados
- Laouti
- Livada
- Loutra
- Lychnaftia
- Malli
- Mamados
- Marlas
- Mesi
- Monastiri
- Monastiria
- Mountados
- Myrsini
- Ormos Agiou Ioannou
- Ormos Panormou
- Panormos
- Perastra
- Platia
- Potamia
- Pyrgos
- Rocharis
- Skalados
- Sklavochorio
- Smardakito
- Sperados
- Steni
- Tarampados
- Tinos
- Triantaros
- Tripotamos
- Tzados
- Venardados
- Volax
- Vourni
- Xinara
- Ysternia

== Notable people ==
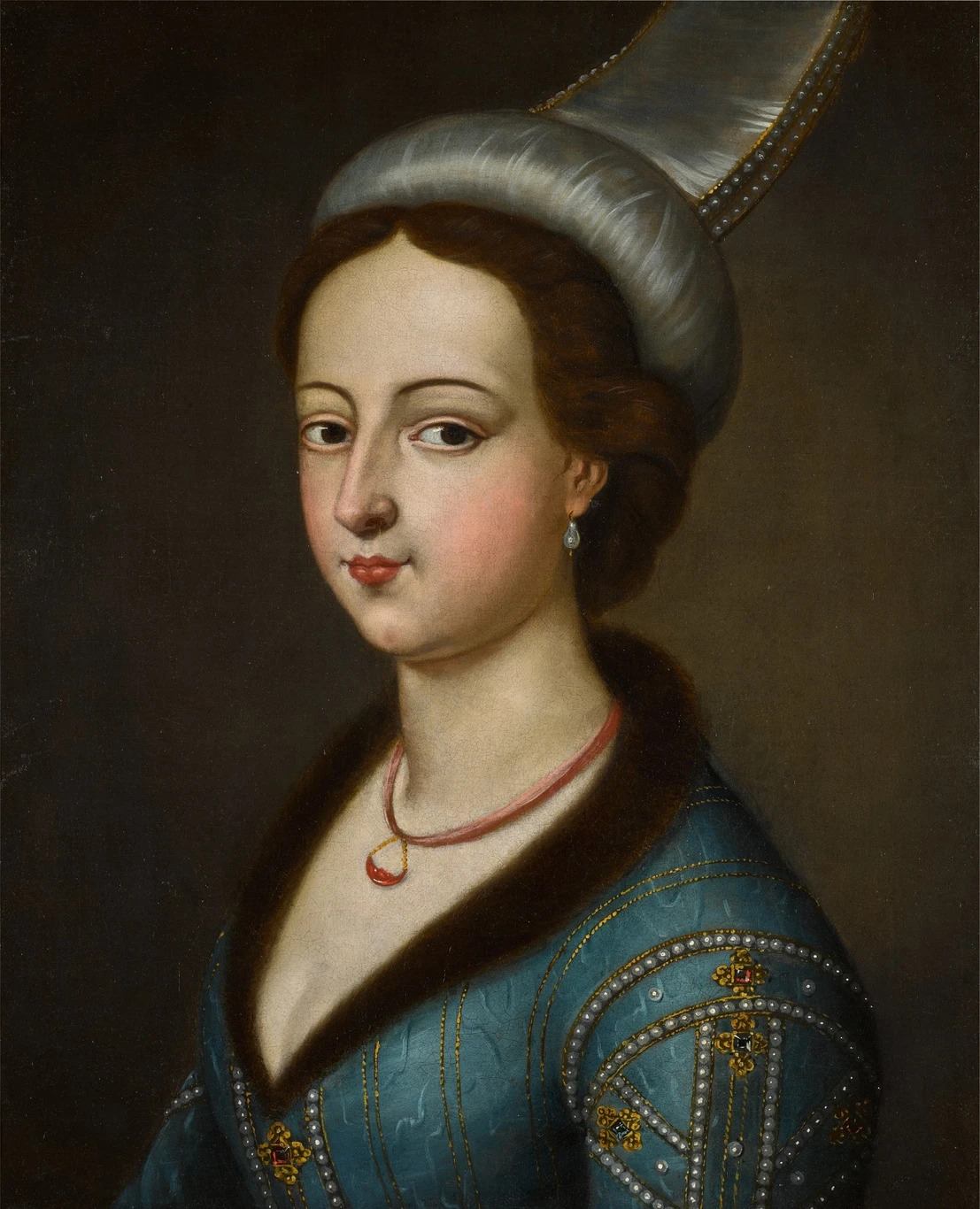
Kösem Sultan, Valide Sultan and the Regent of the Ottoman Empire

- Kösem Sultan (Anastasia), wife of Ottoman Sultan Ahmed I, Haseki Sultan and Valide sultan of the Ottoman Empire, mother of Ottoman Sultans Murad IV, Ibrahim I and the official Regent of the Ottoman Empire. She was the most powerful woman in Ottoman history and one of the most powerful women of the 17th Century. She was the de facto supreme ruler of the Ottoman Empire for 20 years and the only woman to held supreme control over the Ottoman Empire and Caliphate with absolute power similar to that of a Sultan.
- Saint Pelagia
- Ieronymos I (Kotsonis), Archbishop of Athens and All Greece
- Haralambos “Babis” Marmanis, Author, Scientist, CTO
- Yannoulis Chalepas (1851–1938), sculptor
- Lazaros Sochos (1862–1911), sculptor
- Patriarch Photius of Alexandria
- Nikiphoros Lytras (1832–1904), painter
- Nicholaos Gysis (1842–1901), painter
- Stelios Perpiniadis (1899–1977), musician
- Errikos Kontarinis (1906–1971), actor
- Vangelis Protopappas (1917–1995) actor
- Anna Fonsou, actress
- Lefteris Valakas, sculptor
- Fragiskos Alvertis, basketball player
- Alekos Alavanos, politician

== Gallery ==
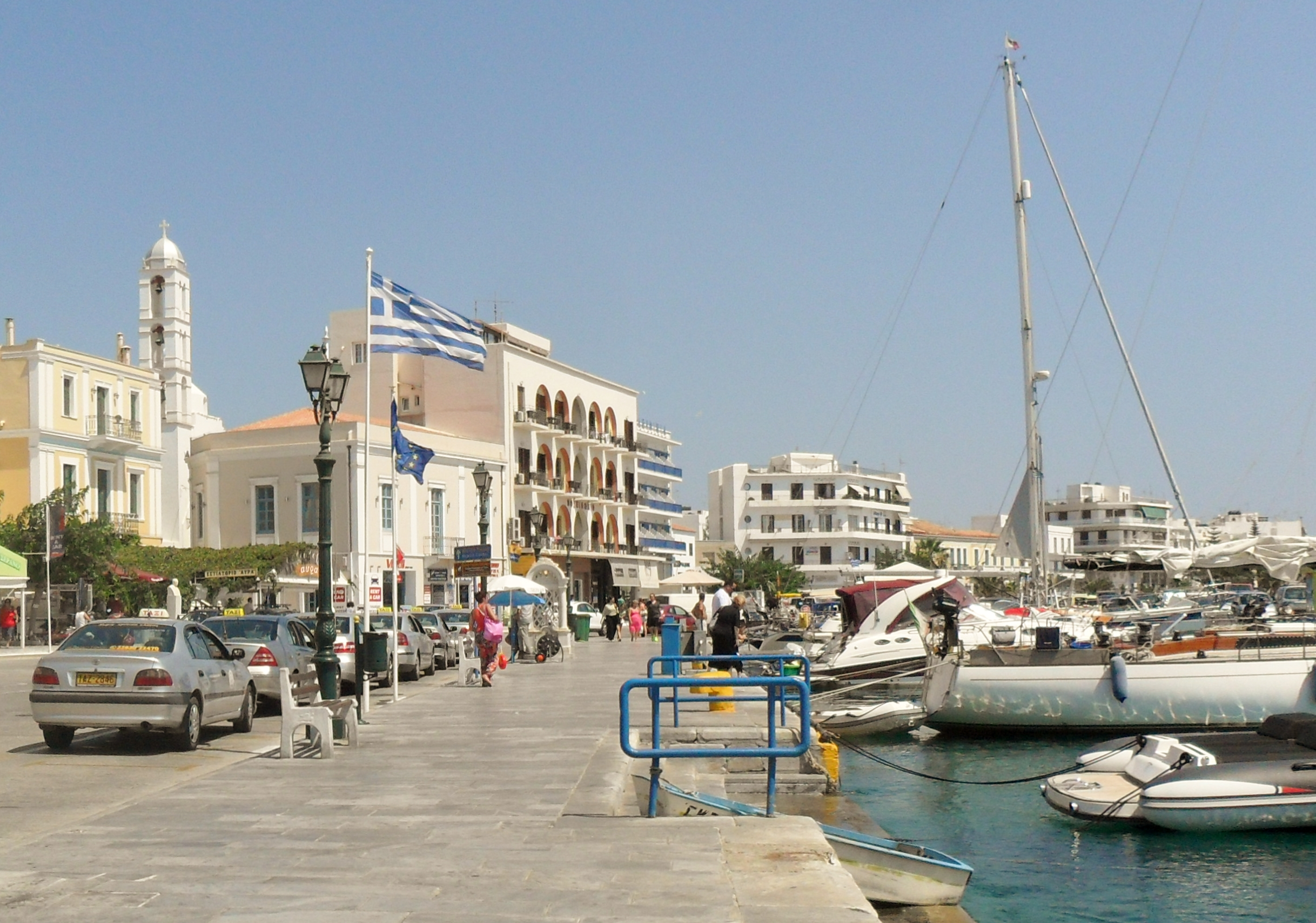
Tinos town, view of the port

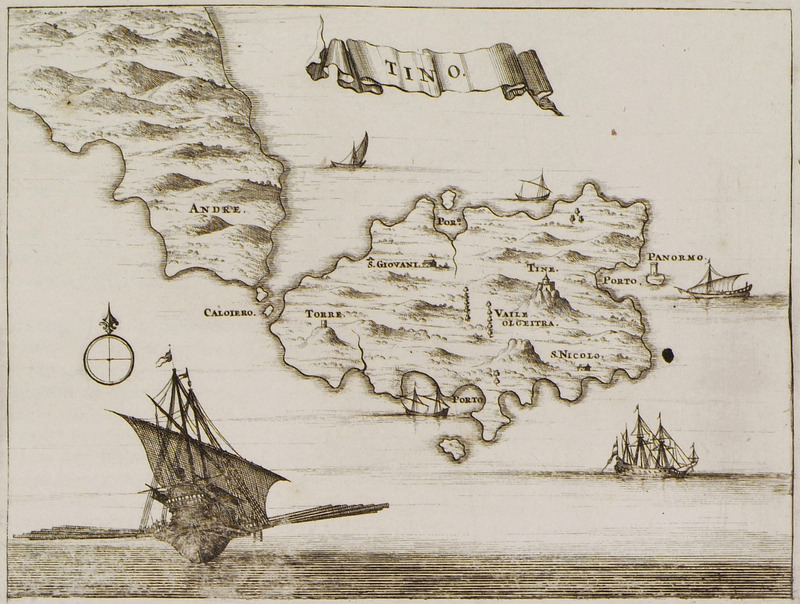
Tinos map, Olfert Dapper, Amsterdam, Wolfgangh, 1688

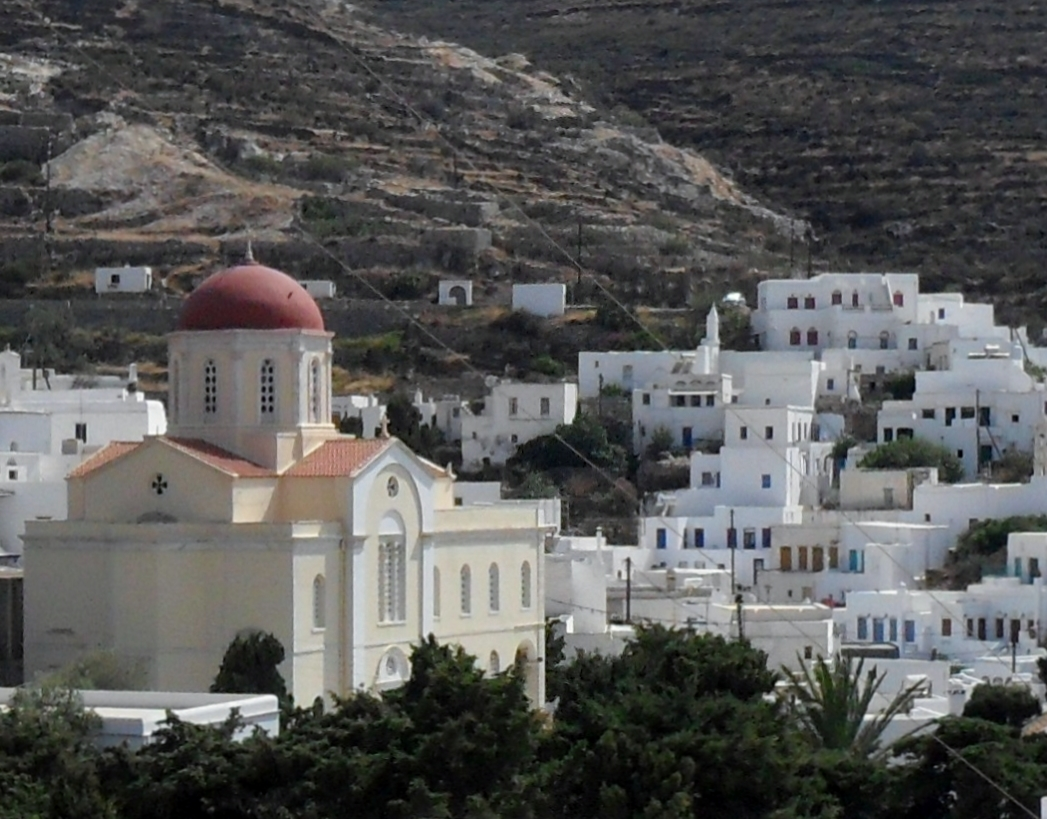
Saint Nicolas church in Panormos (Pyrgos), Tinos

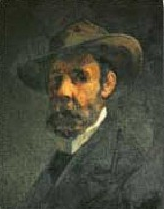
Yannoulis Chalepas

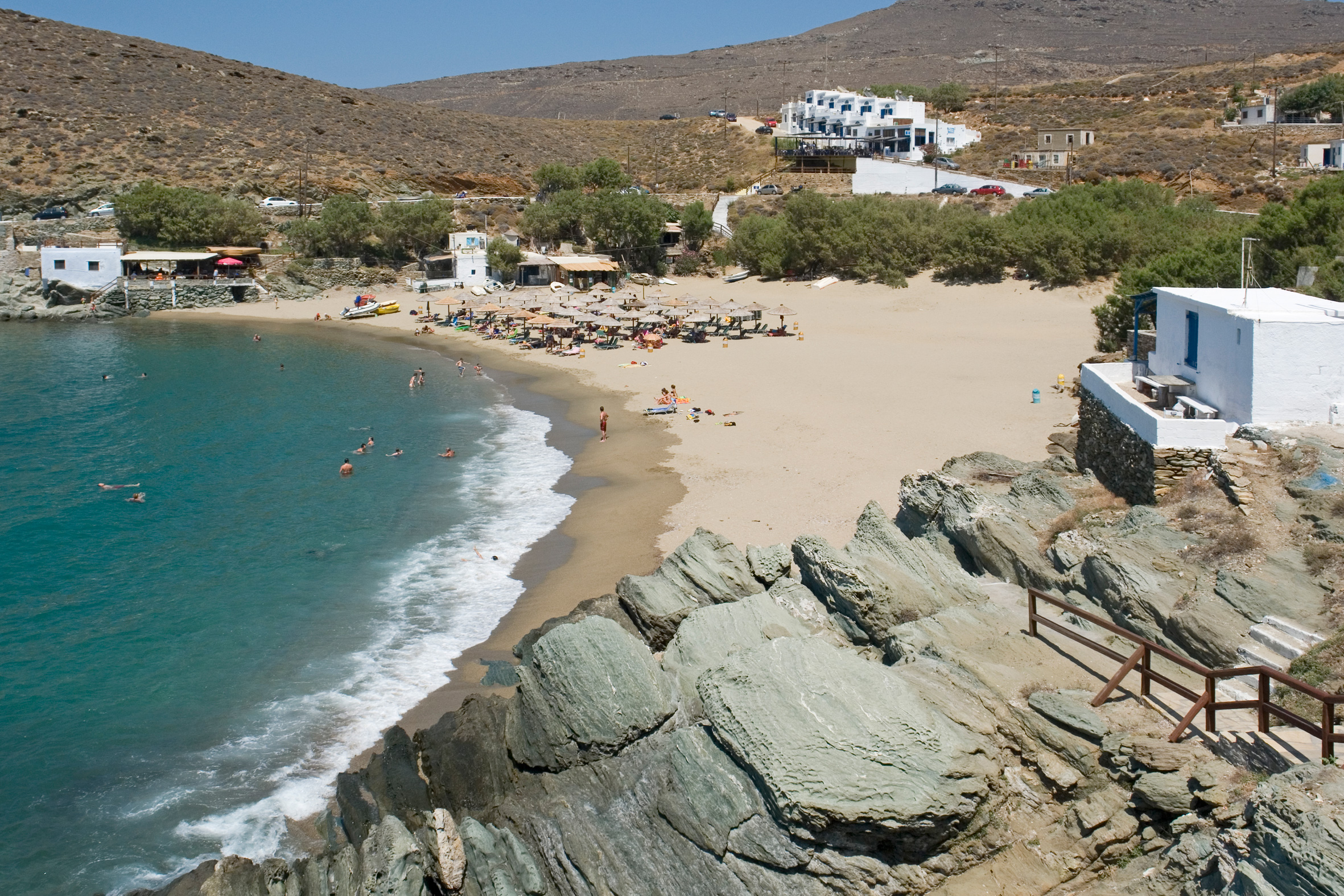
View of Mikri Kolibithra beach

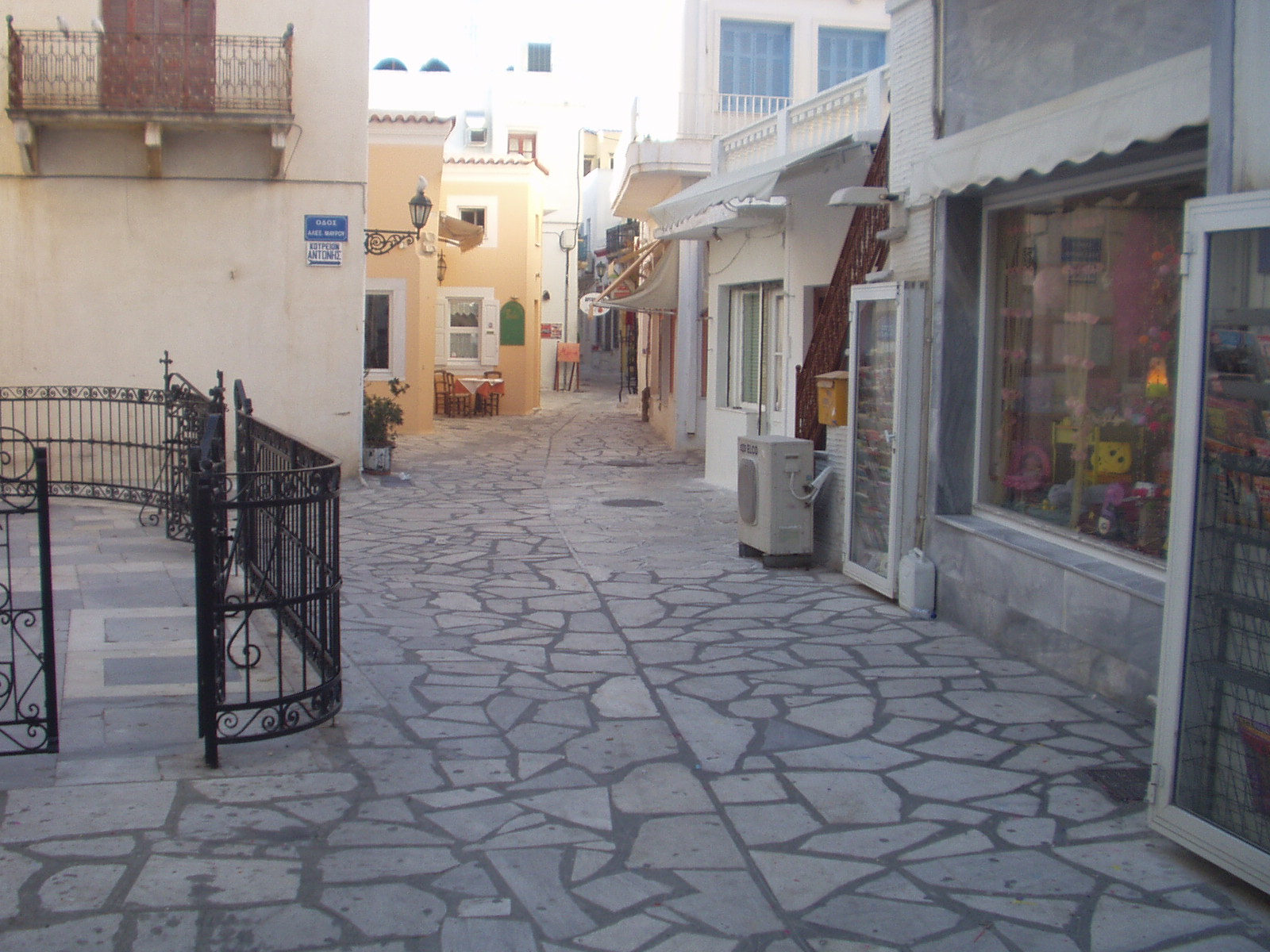
Street of Tinos

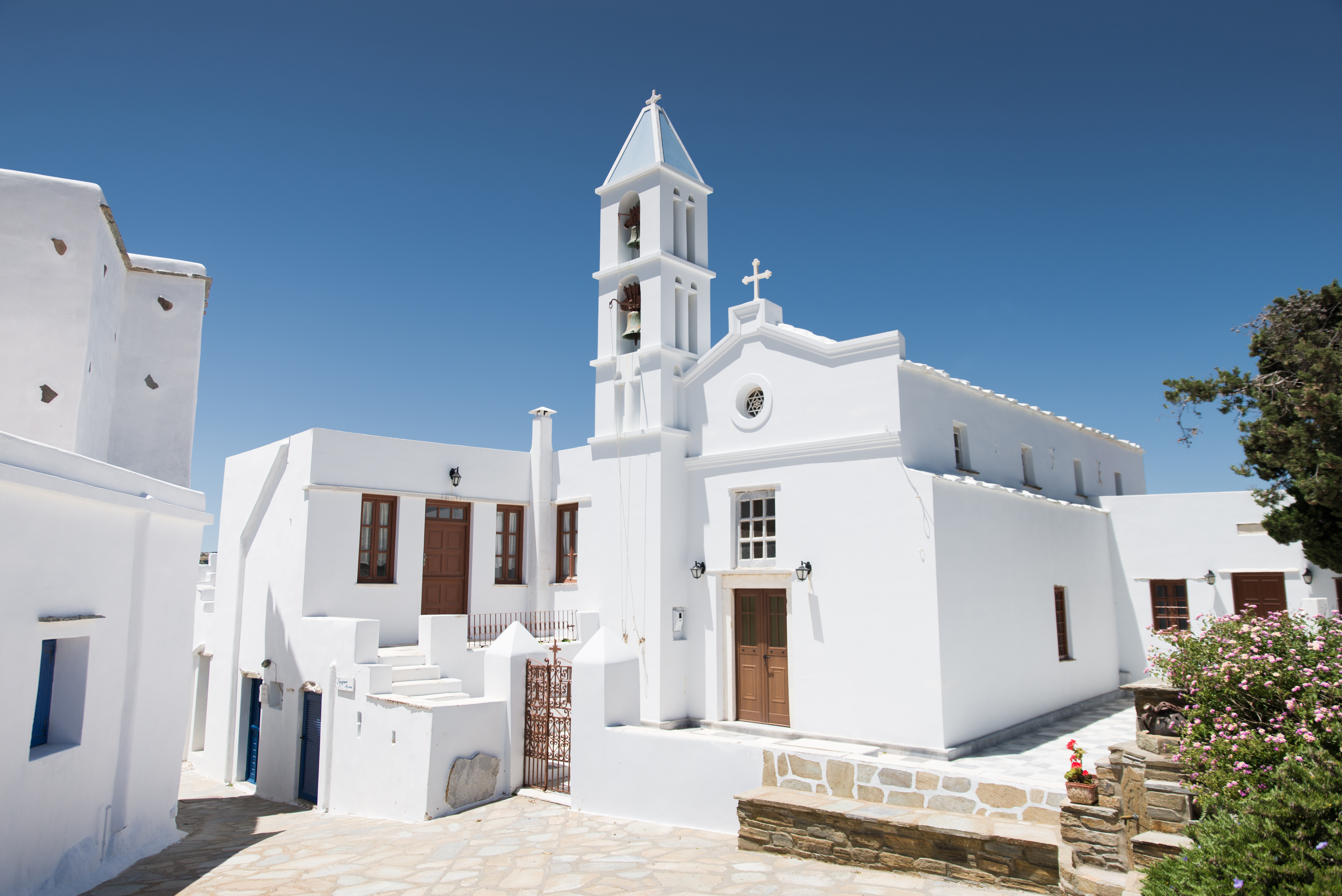
Tinos, Volax

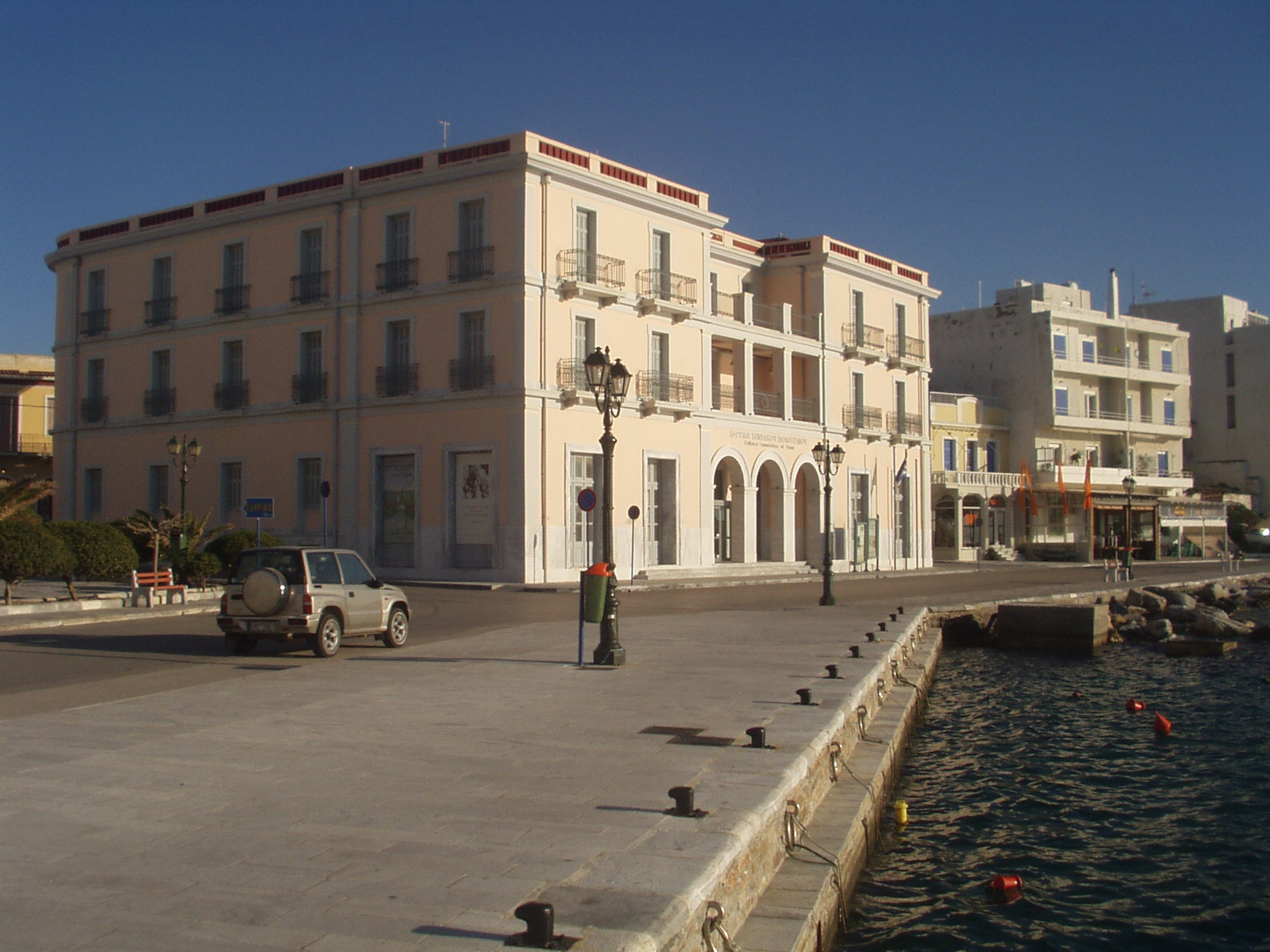
The congress centre

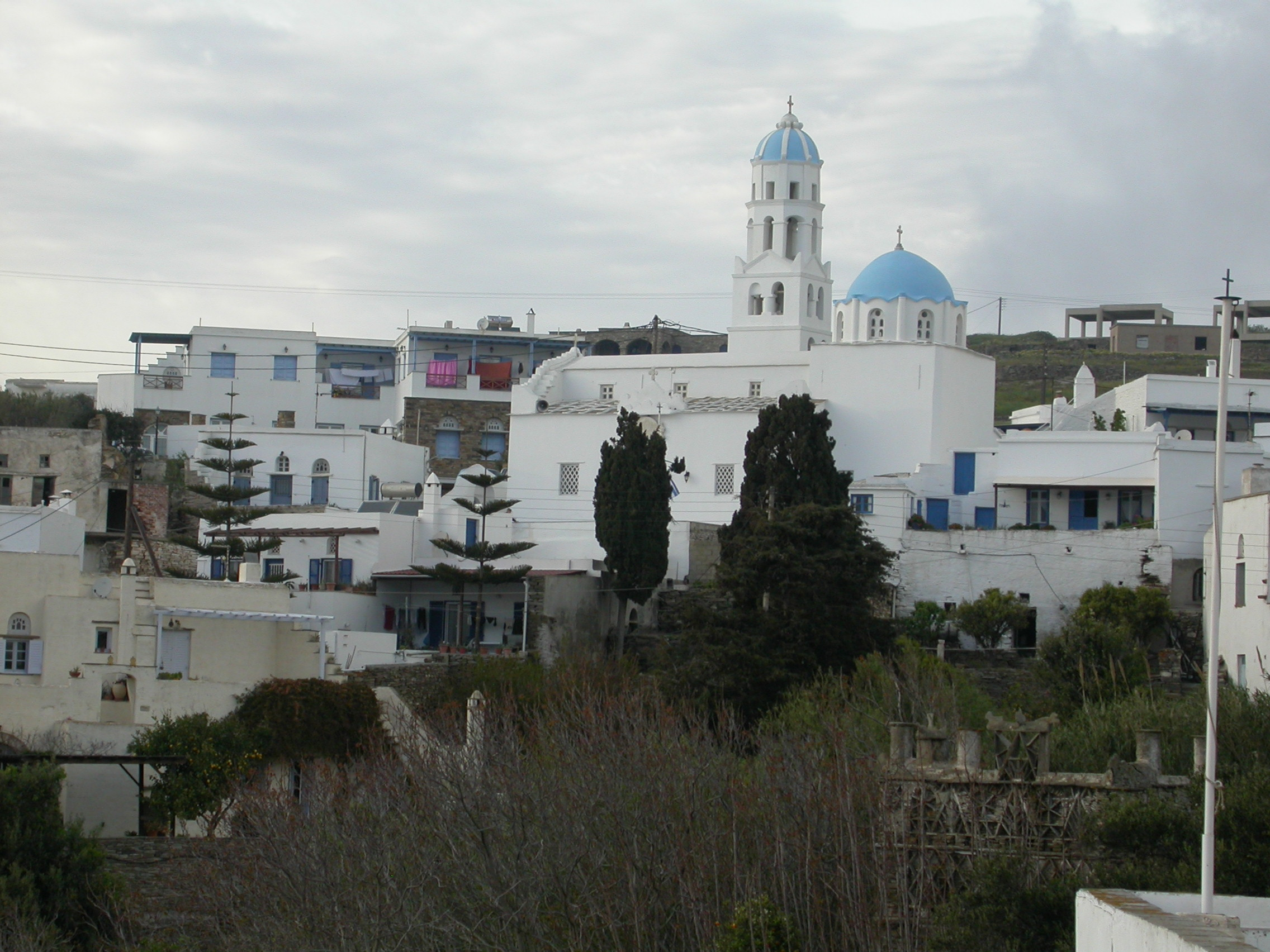
Catholic church at the village of Ktikados

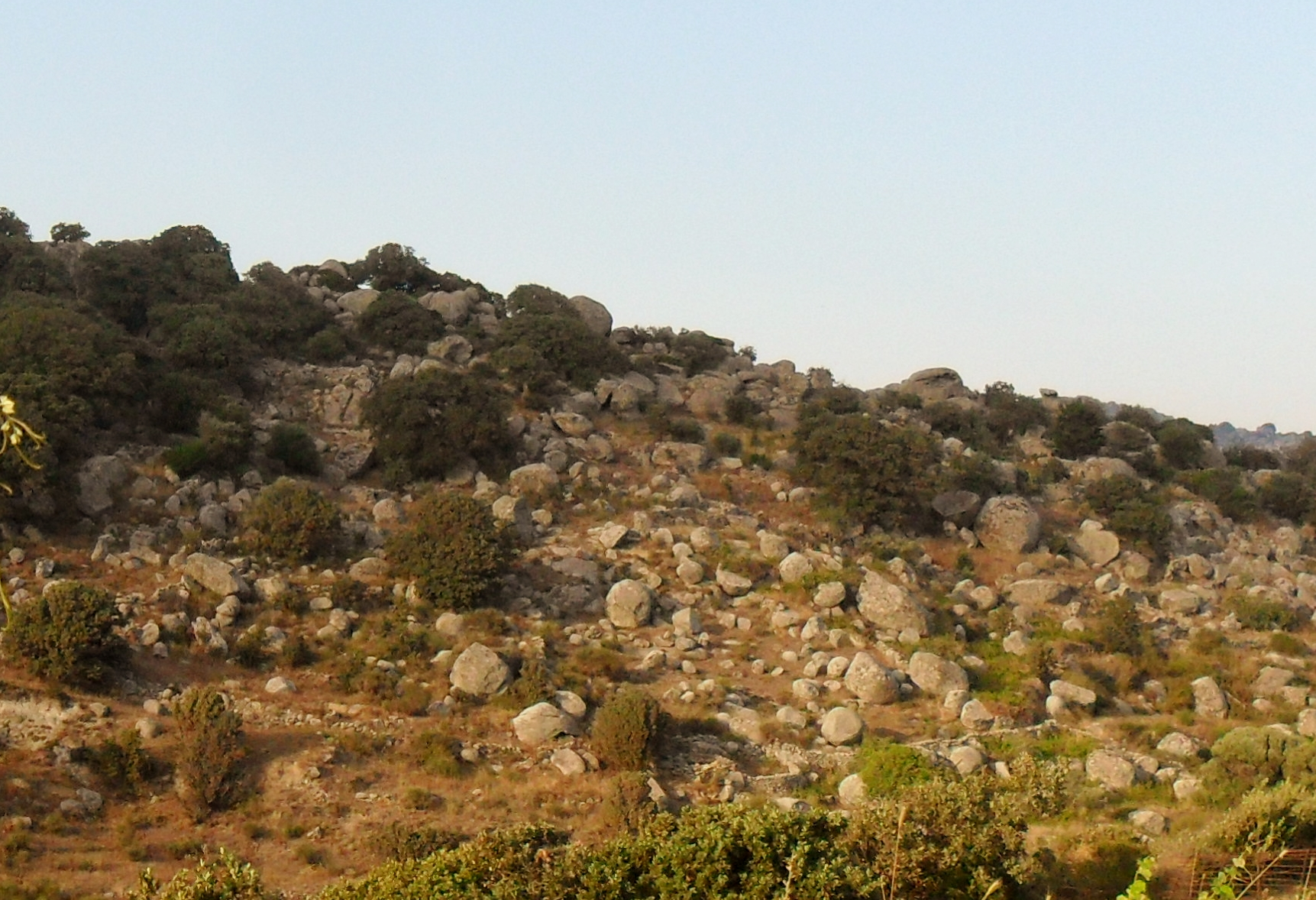
Tinos, Volax landscape

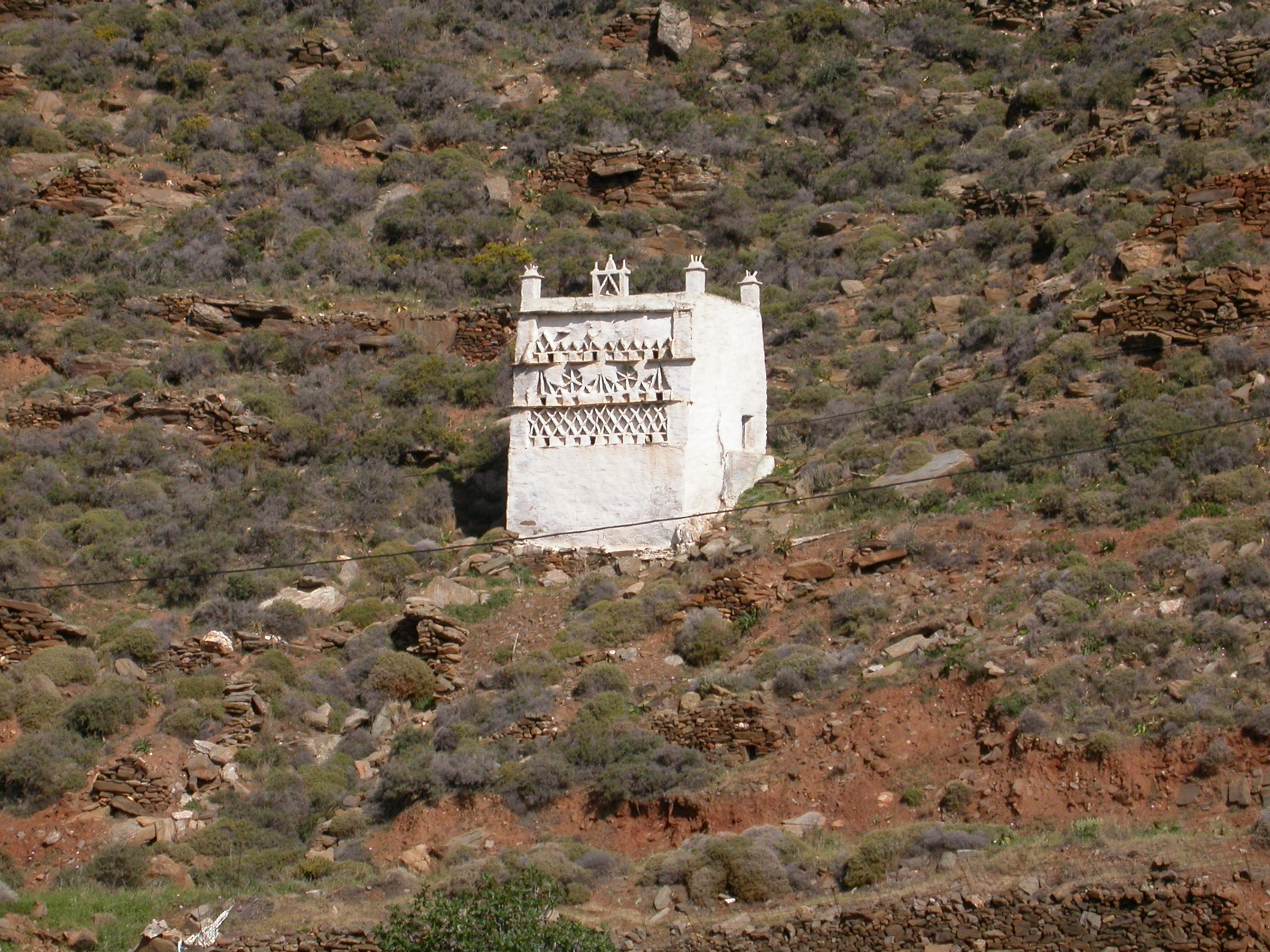
Dovecote near Lichnaftia, Tinos, Greece

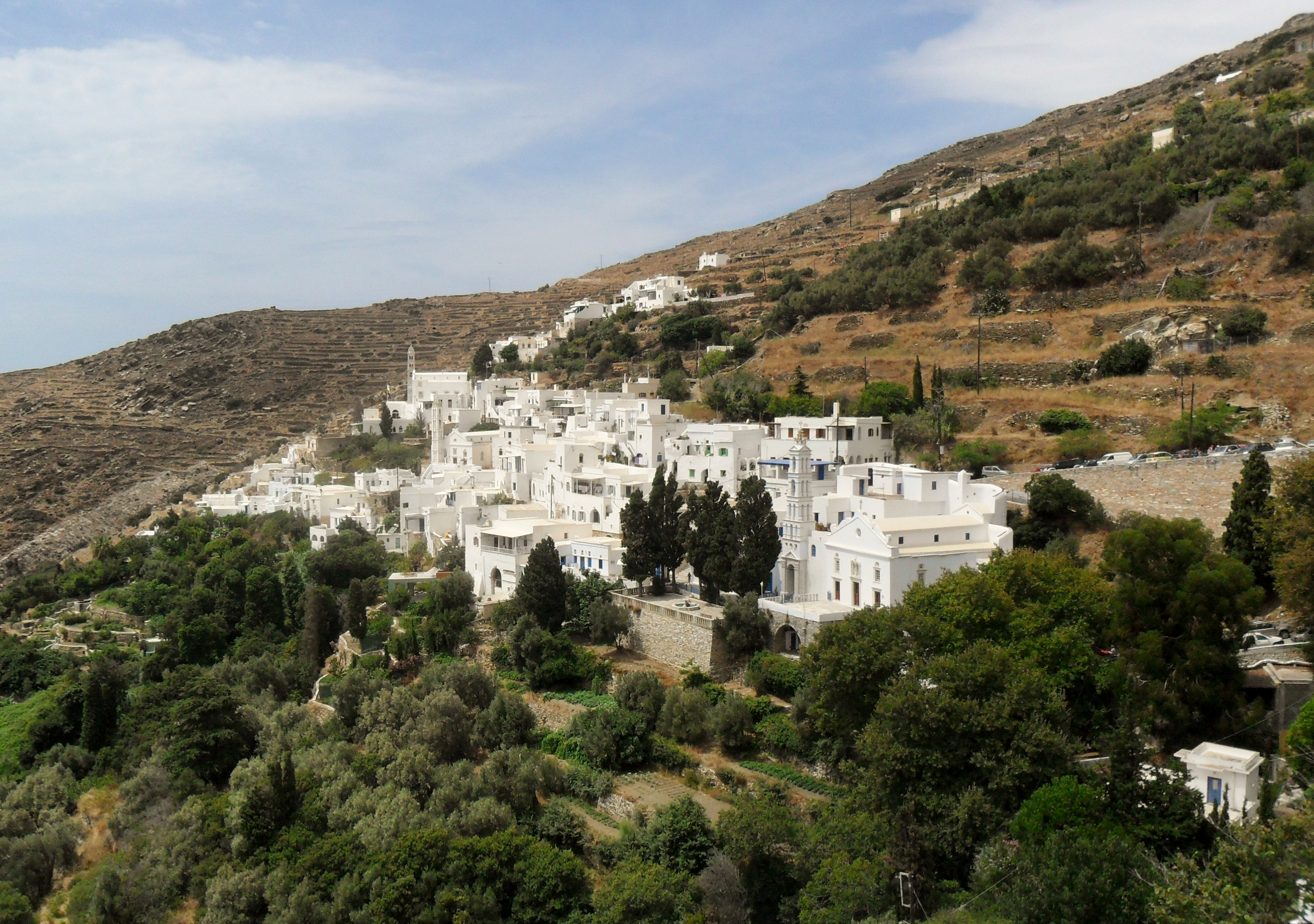
Tinos, Kardiani

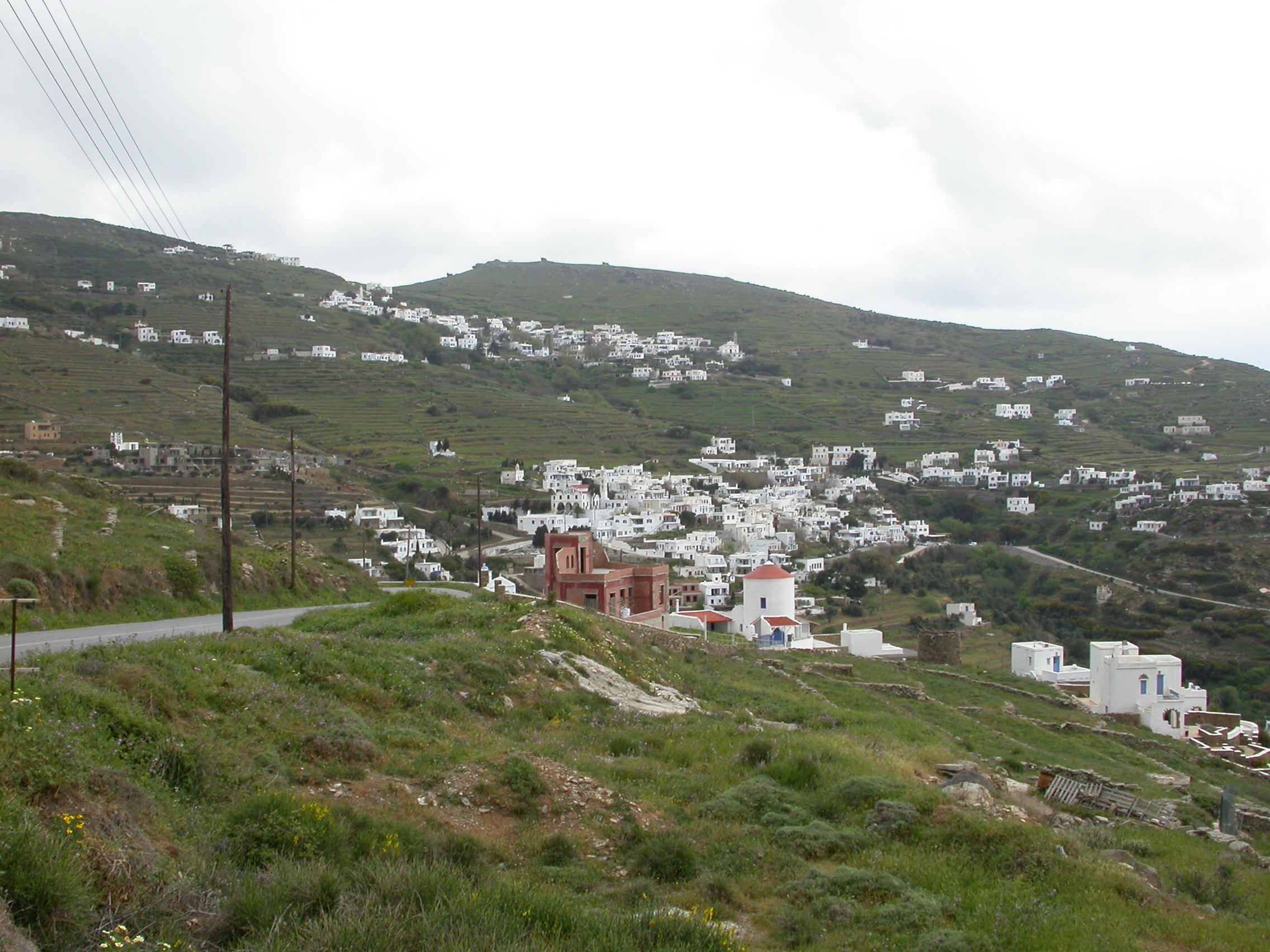
View of Dyo-Choria and Triantaros, Tinos

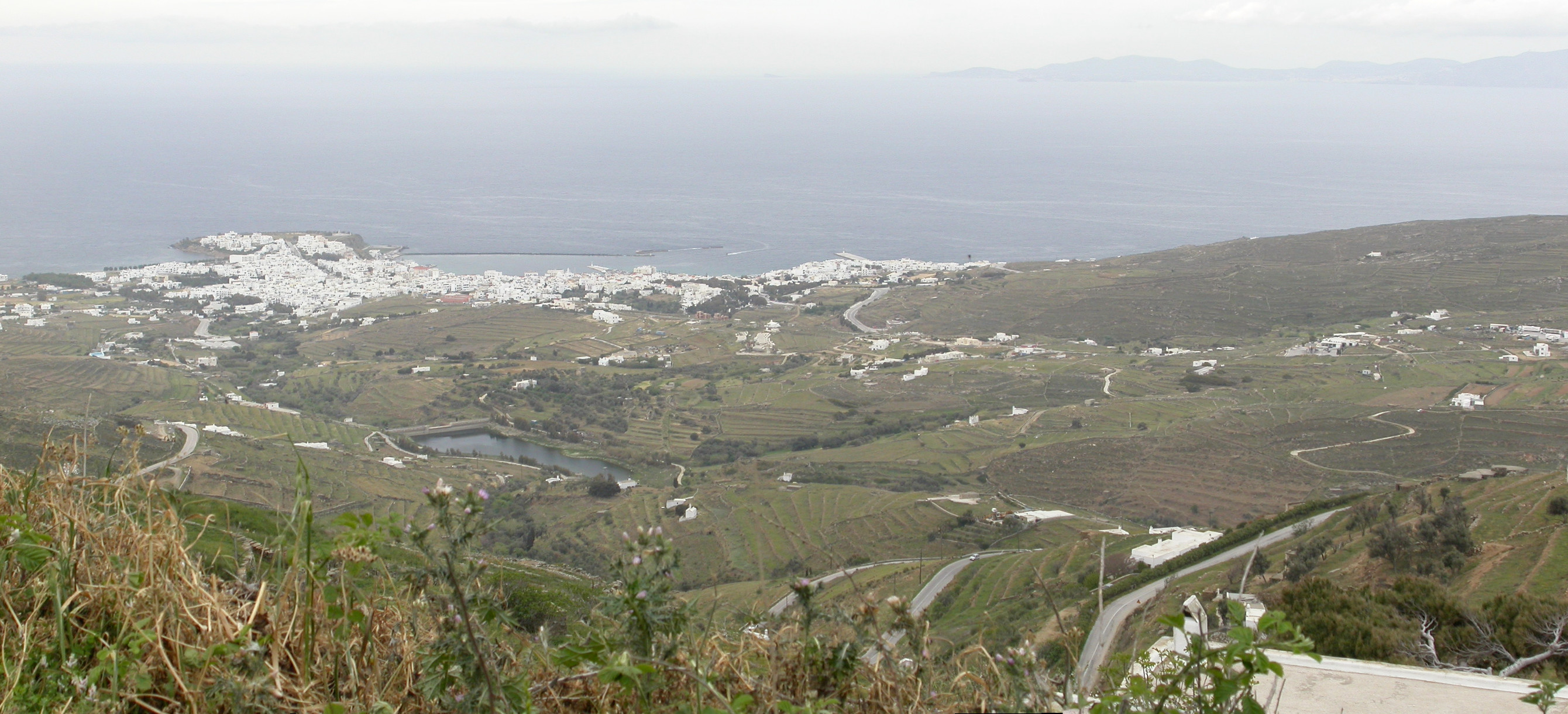
Tinos panorama
