= Christoforos Nezer (d. 1970) =

Greek actor

Christoforos Nezer Χριστόφορος Νέζερ
- Born: 1887; Athens, Greece
- Died: 19 February 1970 (aged 82–83); Athens, Greece
- Occupation: actor

Christoforos Nezer (Greek: Χριστόφορος Νέζερ; 1887 – 19 February 1970) was a Greek actor.

He was descended from the Bavarian Nezer family, who came to Greece with King Otto, and the cousin of actress Marika Nezer. He was a self-taught actor and played a leading role in the establishment of National Theatre of Greece.

== Filmography ==
Year	Film	Greek name and translation	Role
1943	I thyella perase	Η θύελλα πέρασε	-
1956	O agapitikos tis voskopoulas	Ο αγαπητικός της βοσκοπούλας	Hronis
1956	Koritsi me ta paramythia	Κορίτσι με τα παραμύθια (Girl with the Stories)	Thomas
1957	O peirasmos	Ο πειρασμός (The Temptation)	-
1958	Mono gia mia nychta	Μόνο για μια νύχτα (Only for One Night)	Sirios
1958	Makria ap' ton kosmo	Μακριά απ' τον κόσμο (Far Away From the World)	Petros
1959	Ena nero kyra-Vangelio	Ένα νερό κυρα-Βαγγελιώ	Polykarpos
1960	Malamo	Μαλάμω	Giorgas
1960	Kassiani	Κασσιανή	-
1960	Plousioi horis lefta!	Πλούσιοι χωρίς λεφτά! (Rich Without Money)	-
1961	I Betty pandrevetai	Η Μπέτυ παντρεύεται (Betty Is Getting Married)	Periklis
1962	O loustrakos	Ο λουστράκος	Petros
1962	Lafina	Λαφίνα	Minas
1963	Anamesa se dio agapes	Ανάμεσα σε δυο αγάπες (Between Two Lovers)	-
1963	Lenio i voskopoula	Λενιώ η βοσκοπούλα (Lenio the Shepherdess)	Stamos
1963	Agapisa kai ponesa	Αγάπησα και πόνεσα (I Have Loved and Have Been Hurt)	-
1963	Pligomenes kardies	Πληγωμένες καρδιές (Wounded Hearts)	Dimosthenis
1964	I modistroula	Η μοδιστρούλα	Andreas
1964	Gamos ala Ellinika	Γάμος αλά Ελληνικά (A Greek Wedding)	a judge
1964	Zoi gemati pono	Ζωή γεμάτη πόνο (Life Full of Pain)	Periklis
1965	Kataigida	Καταιγίδα (Storm)	-
1967	An oles oi gynaikes tou kosmou...	Αν όλες οι γυναίκες του κόσμου... (If All the Women of the World...)	Vangelis Vayis
1970	I alli siopi	Η άλλη σιωπή (The Other Silence)	-
