= Archaeological Museum of Naxos =

Archaeological museum in Naxos, Greece

Coordinates: 37°06′20″N 25°22′38″E

Archaeological Museum of Naxos (Greek: Αρχαιολογικό Μουσείο Νάξου) is a museum in Naxos, Greece.

This newly declared historical monument is located in a Venetian building, built some time between 1600 and 1800 for the Jesuit school established in 1700, later becoming the Archaeological Museum in 1972.

The museum houses finds from the Early Cycladic period including figurines from Naxos itself, Kato Kouphonisi and Keros, from the Late Mycenaean period including stirrup jars and other grave goods from chamber tombs and other graves from the Kamini mound and Aplomata. A smaller area is given over to finds from the Geometric Period and later finds, including sculpture from all periods of Naxos' history.

With effect from 7 January 2019, it is open from 08.00 to 15.30 daily, except Tuesdays.

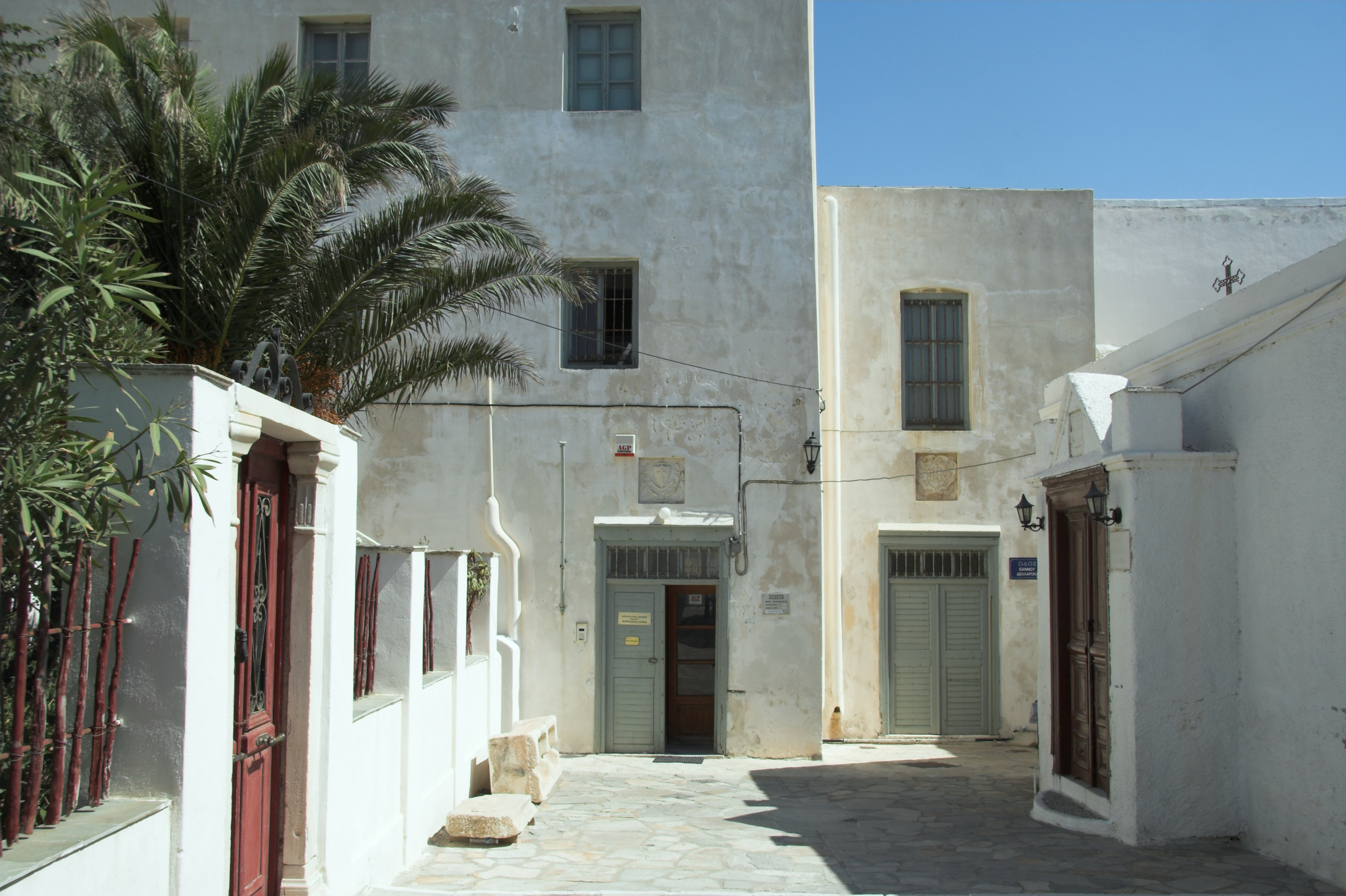
Building of the Museum

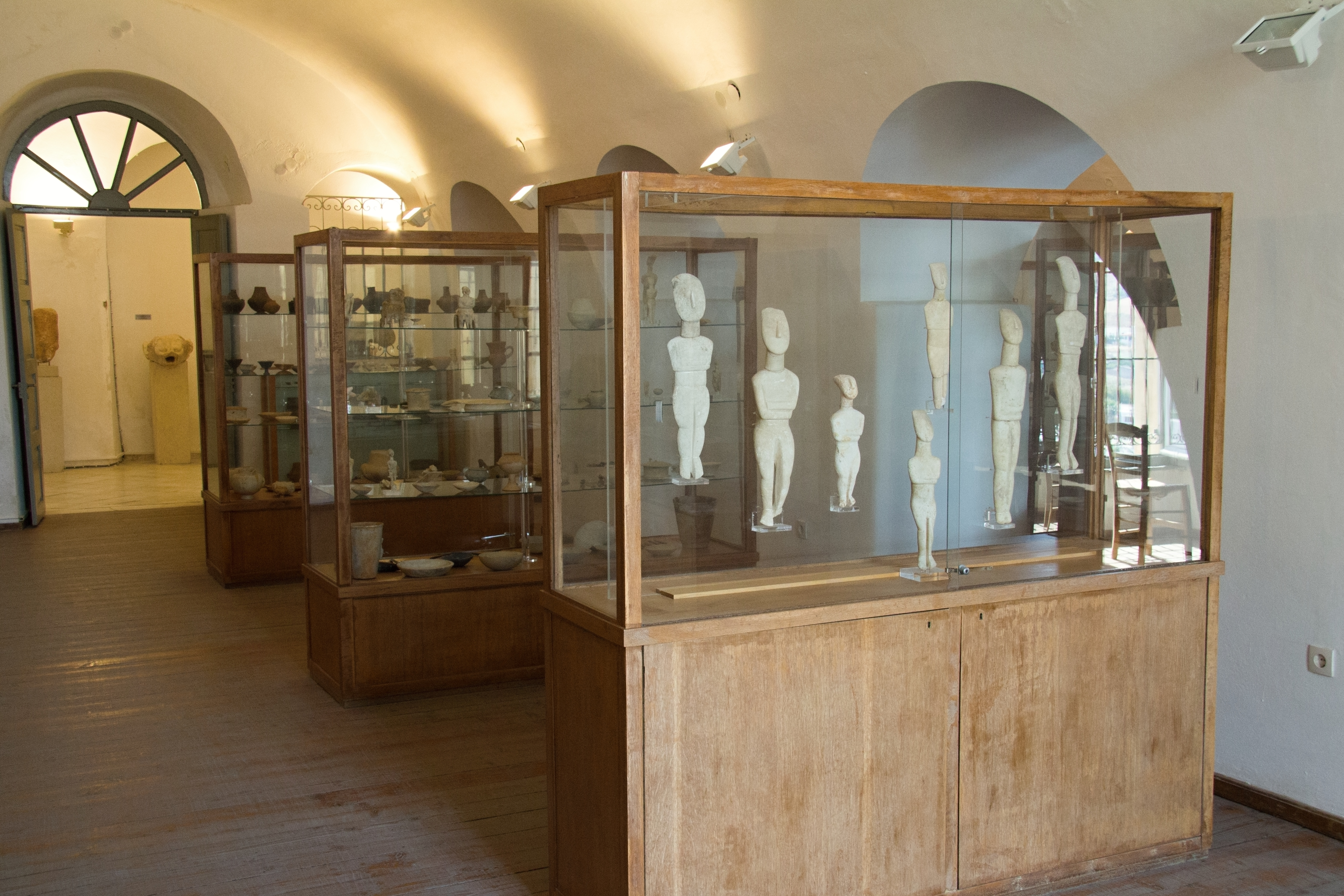
Cases of Early Cycladic art

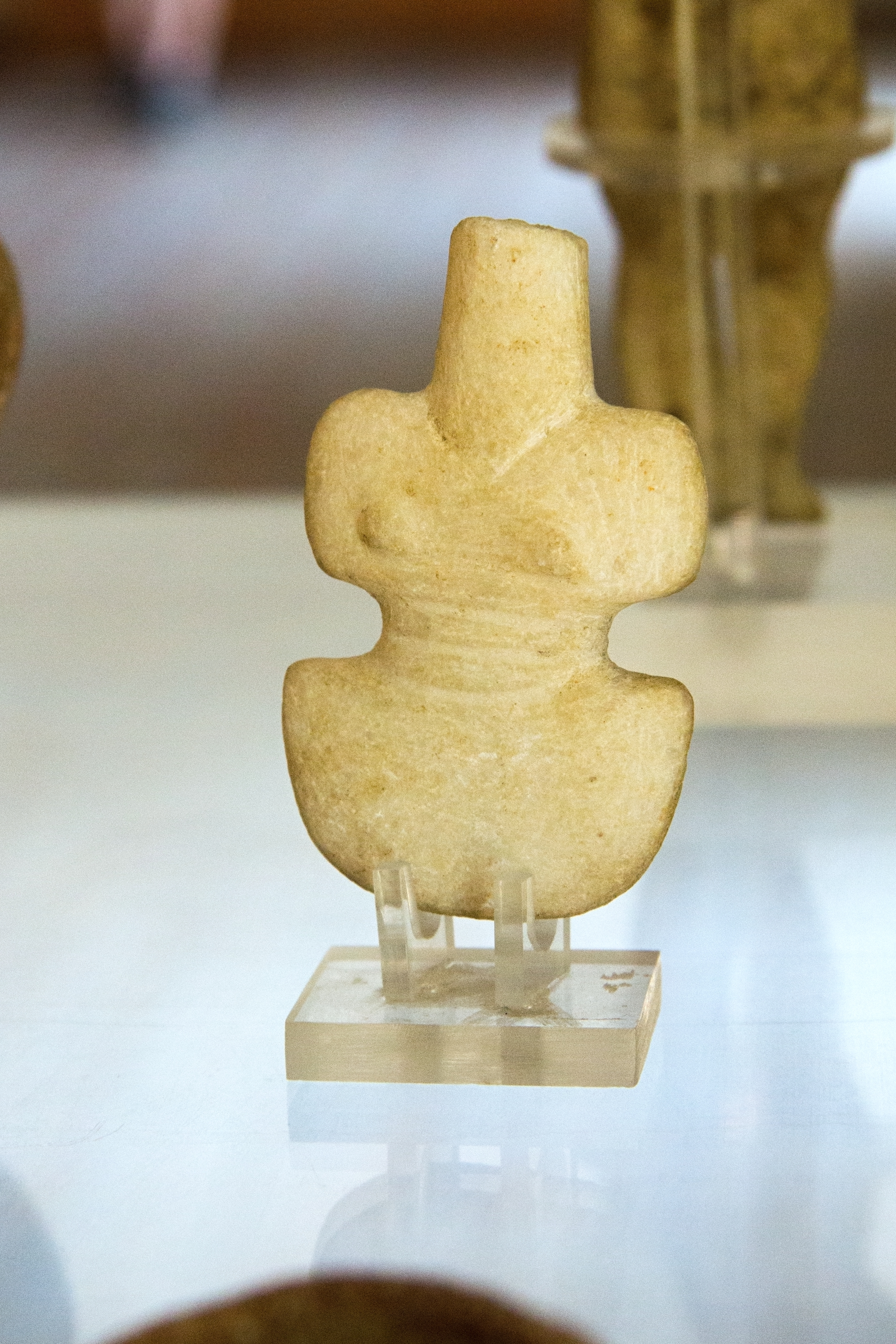
Violin shaped Cycladic figurine, 3200-2800 BC

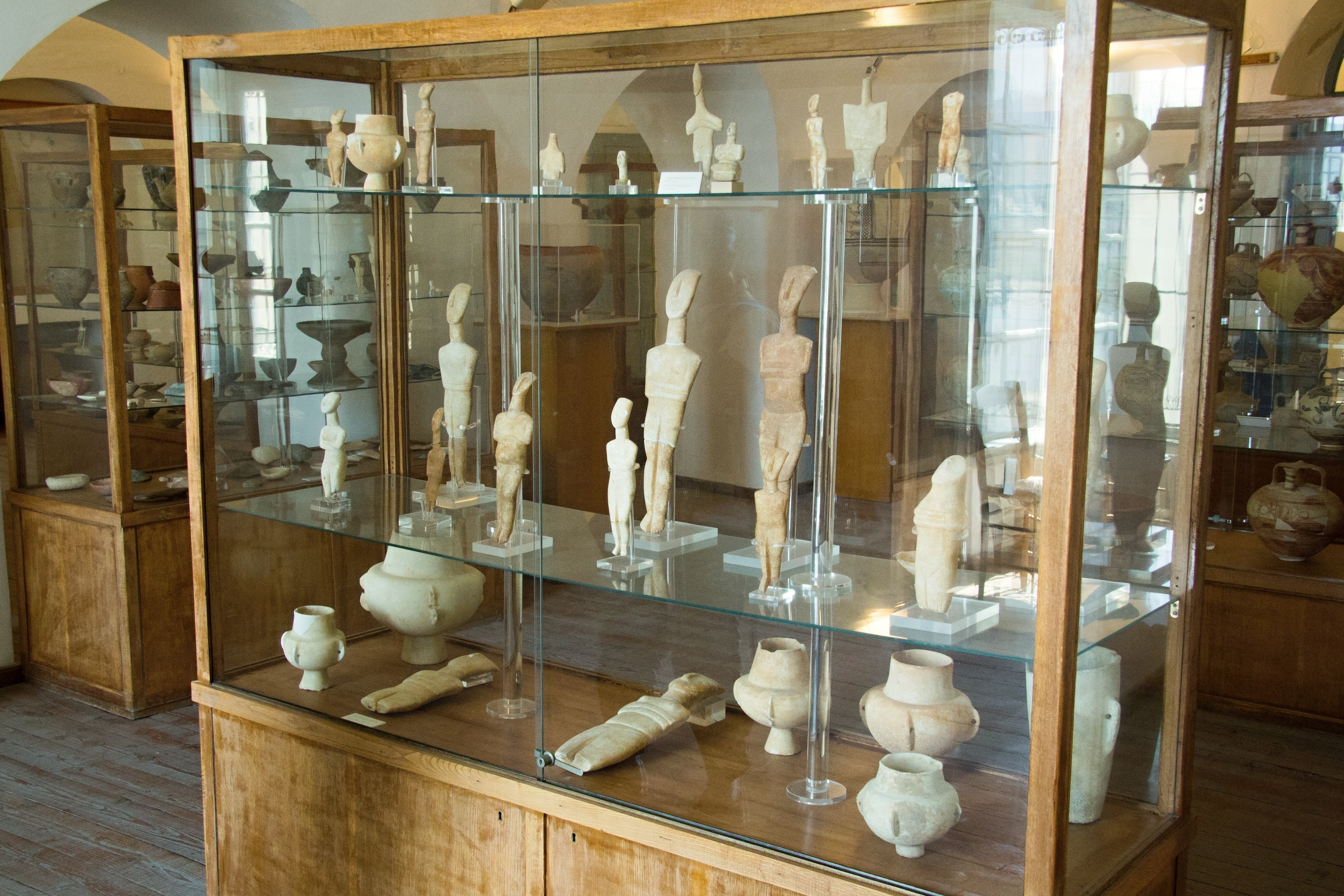
Cycladic figurines and stone vessels, Naxos, 3200-2300 BC

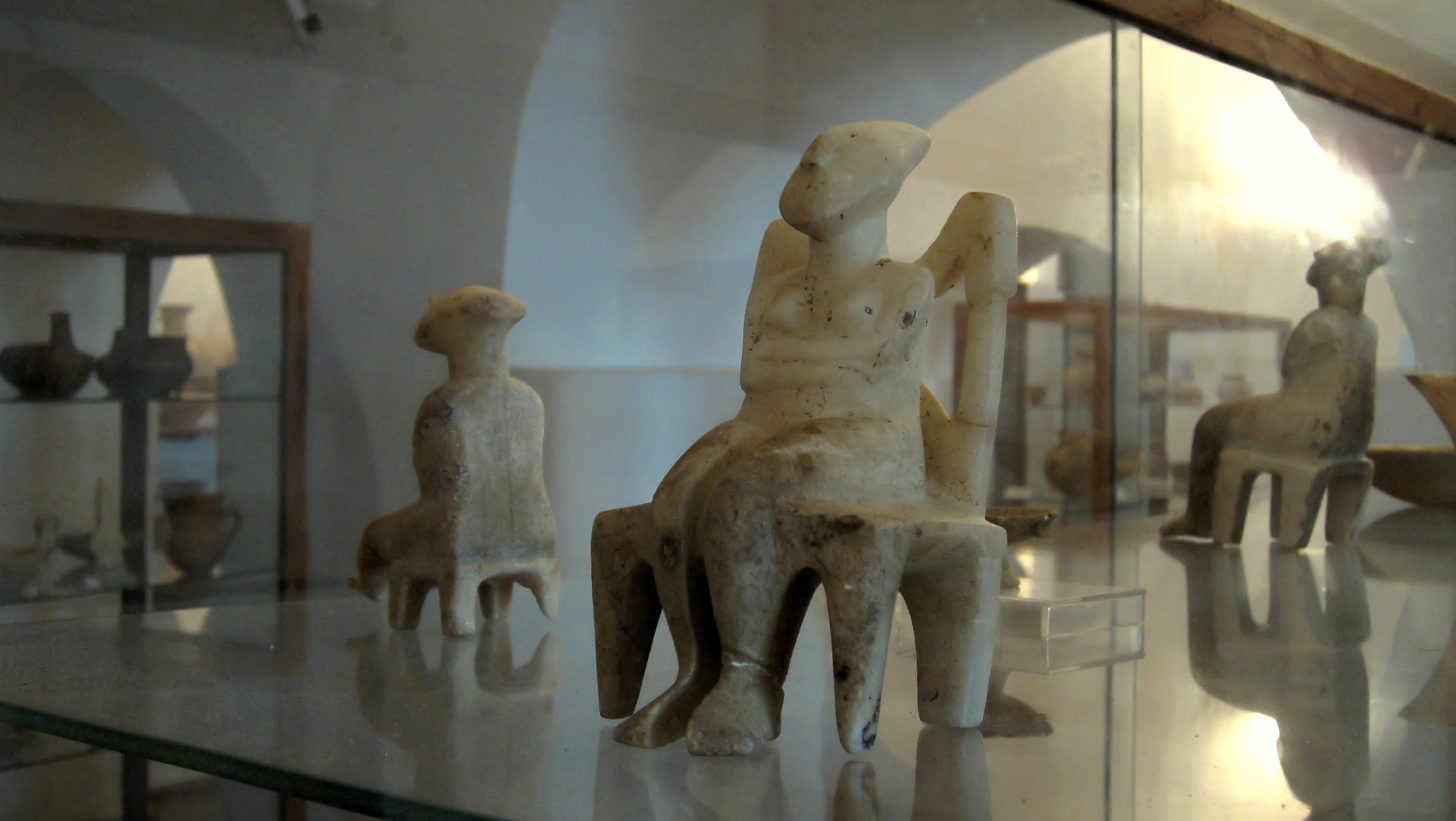
Enthroned Cycladic figurines, Naxos, 3rd millennium BC

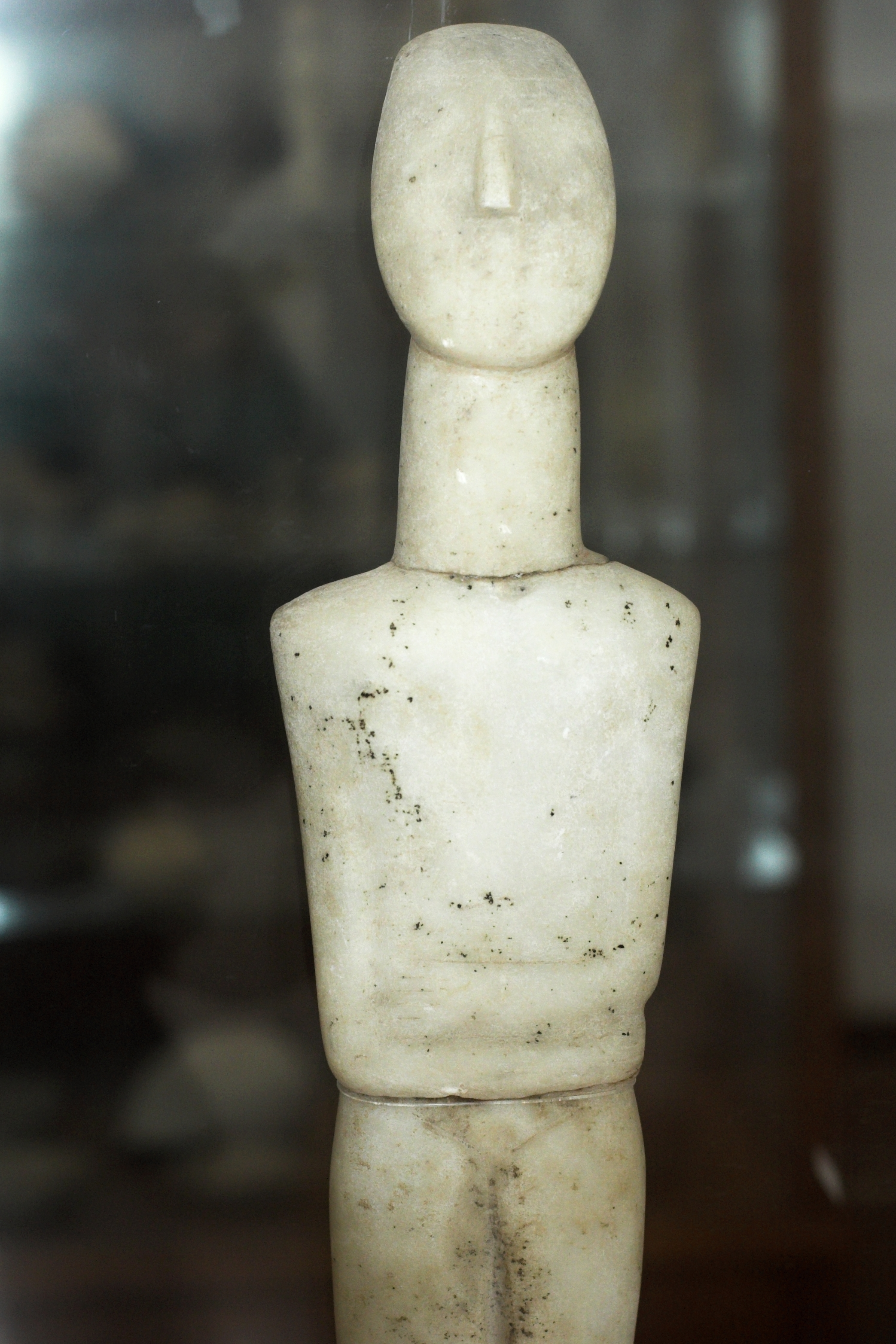
Cycladic female figurine, Naxos, 2800-2300 BC

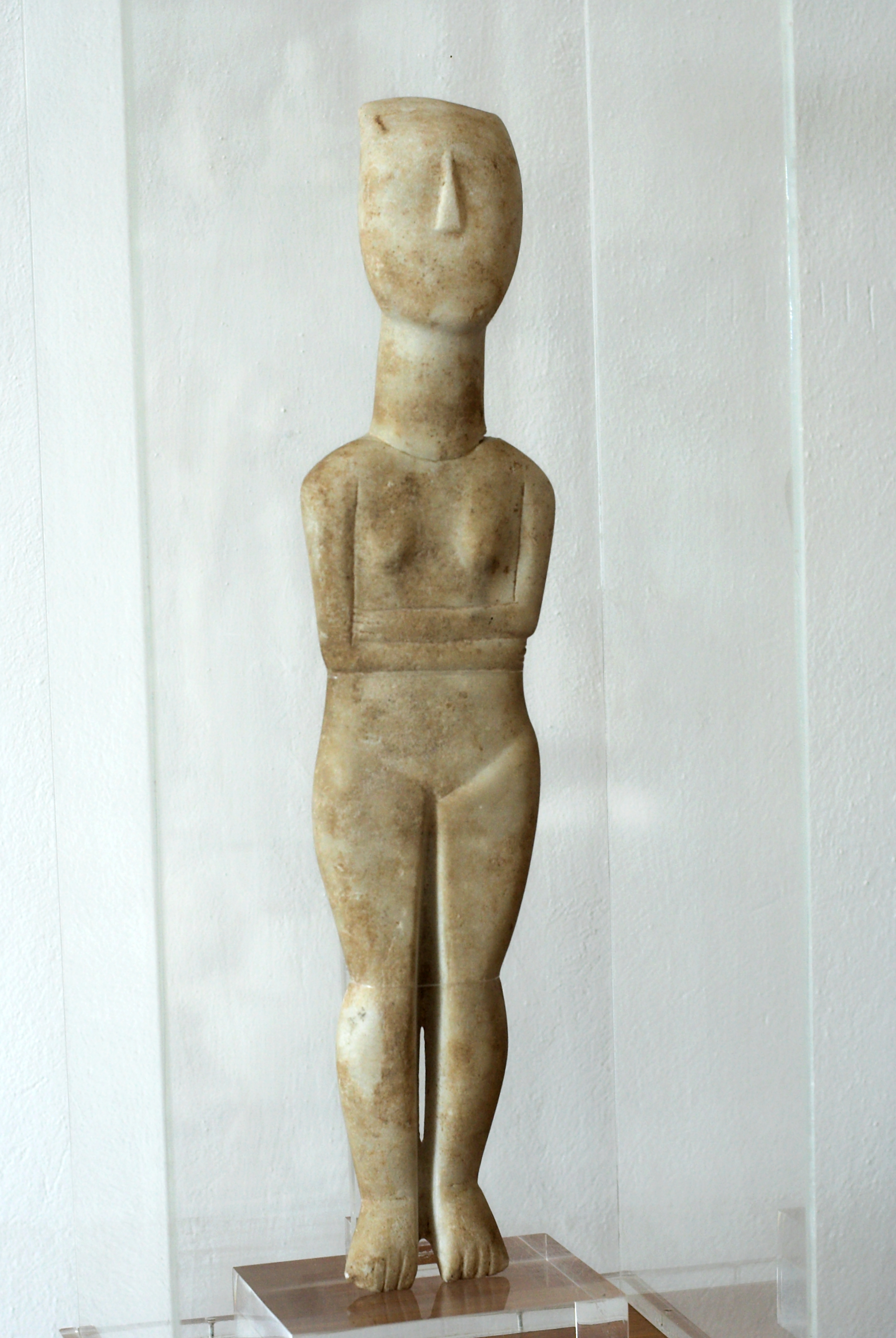
Cycladic female figurine, Keros, 2800-2300 BC

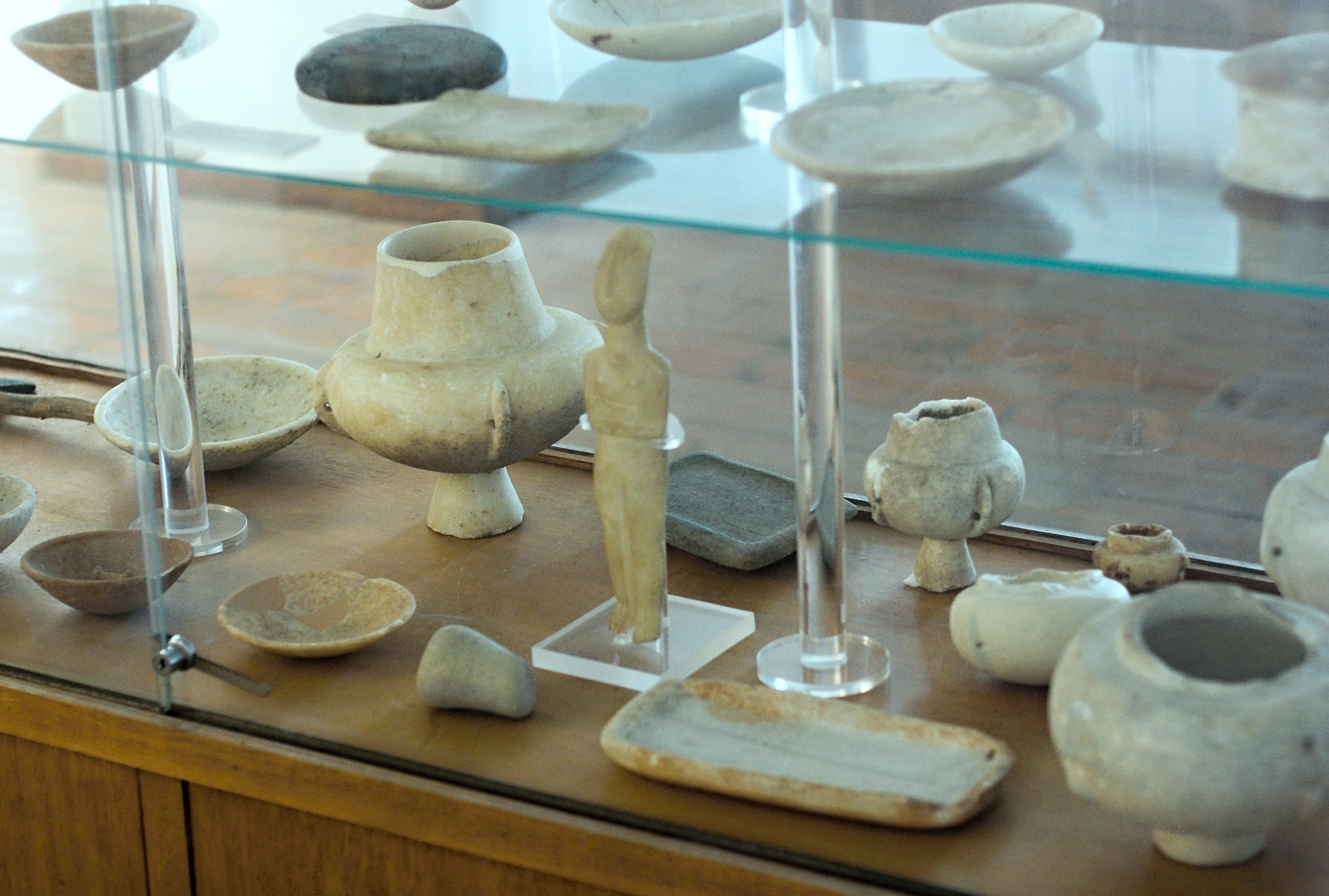
Cycladic figurines and stone vessels, Naxos, 3rd millennium BC

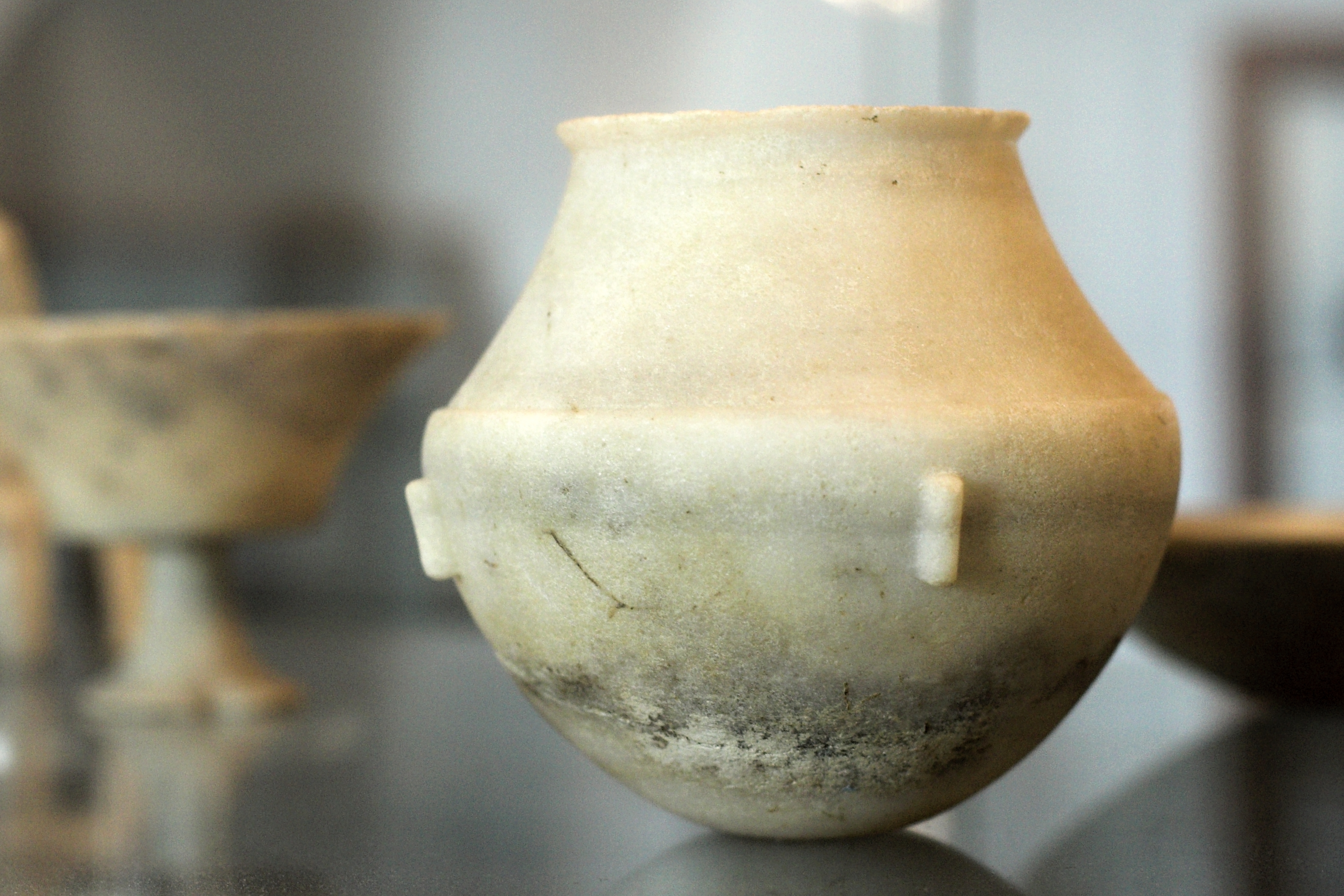
Cycladic marble vessel, Naxos, 3000-2300 BC

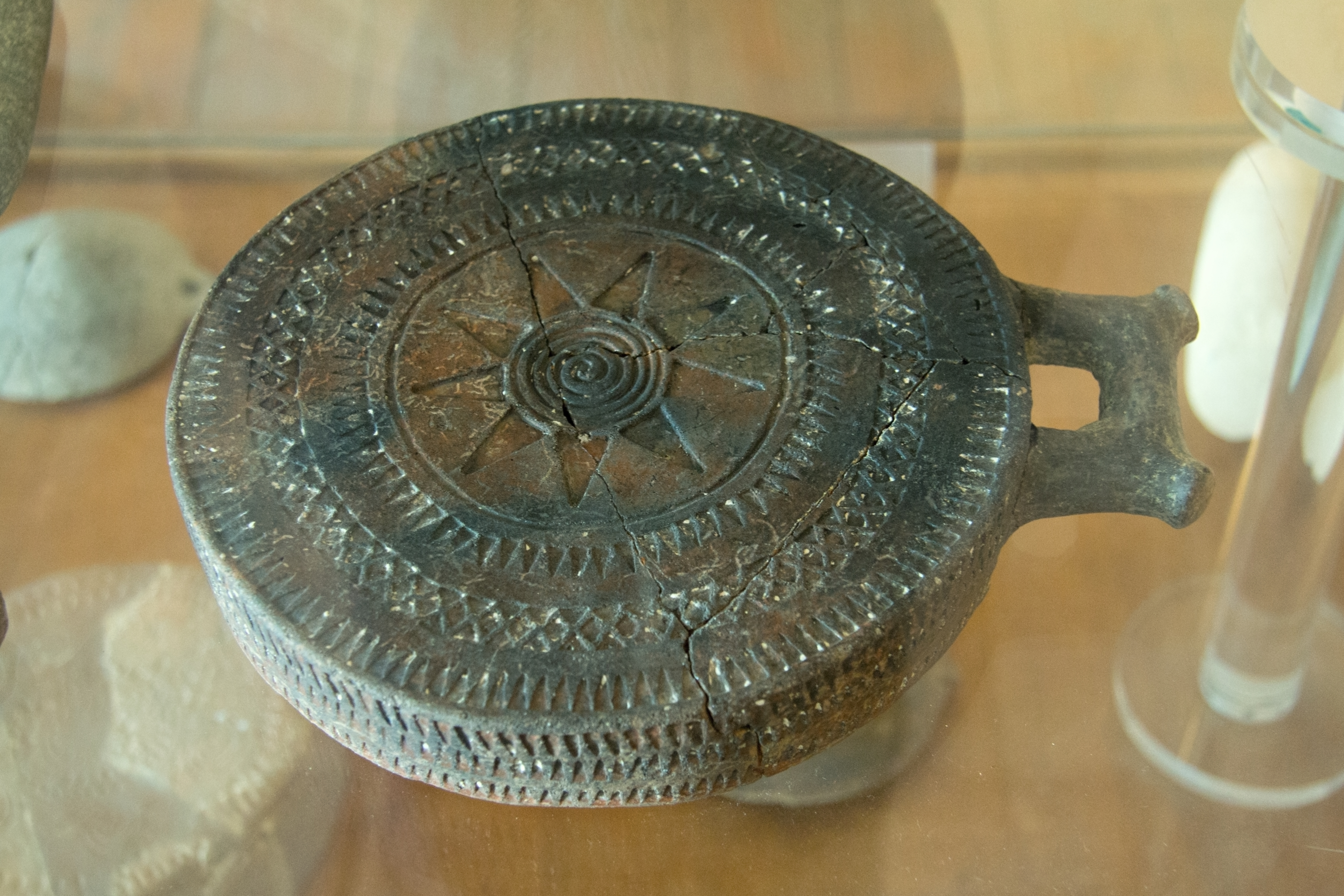
Cycladic "frying-pan", Pano Koufonisi, 2800-2500 BC

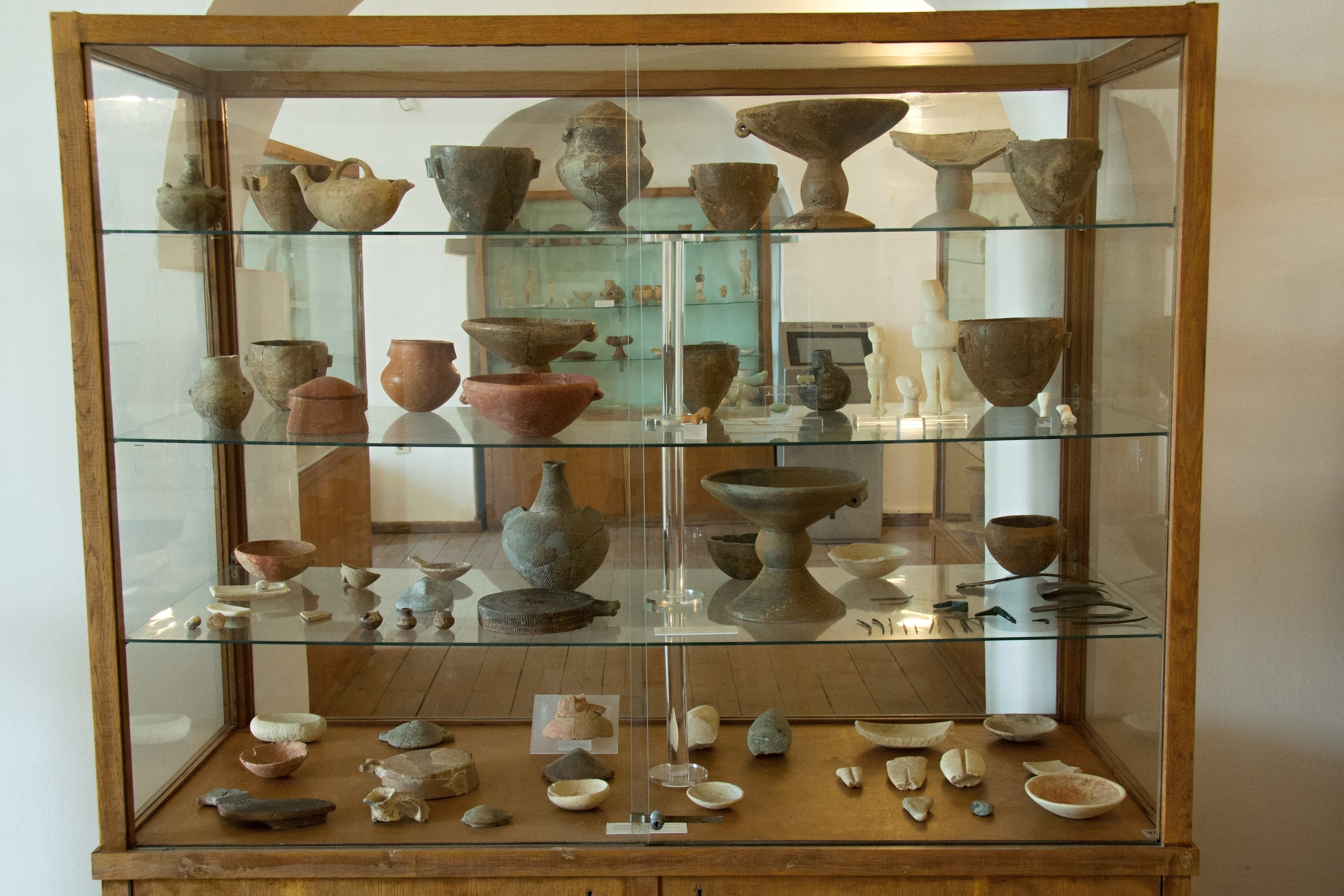
Finds from Pano Koufonisi, 2800-2300 BC

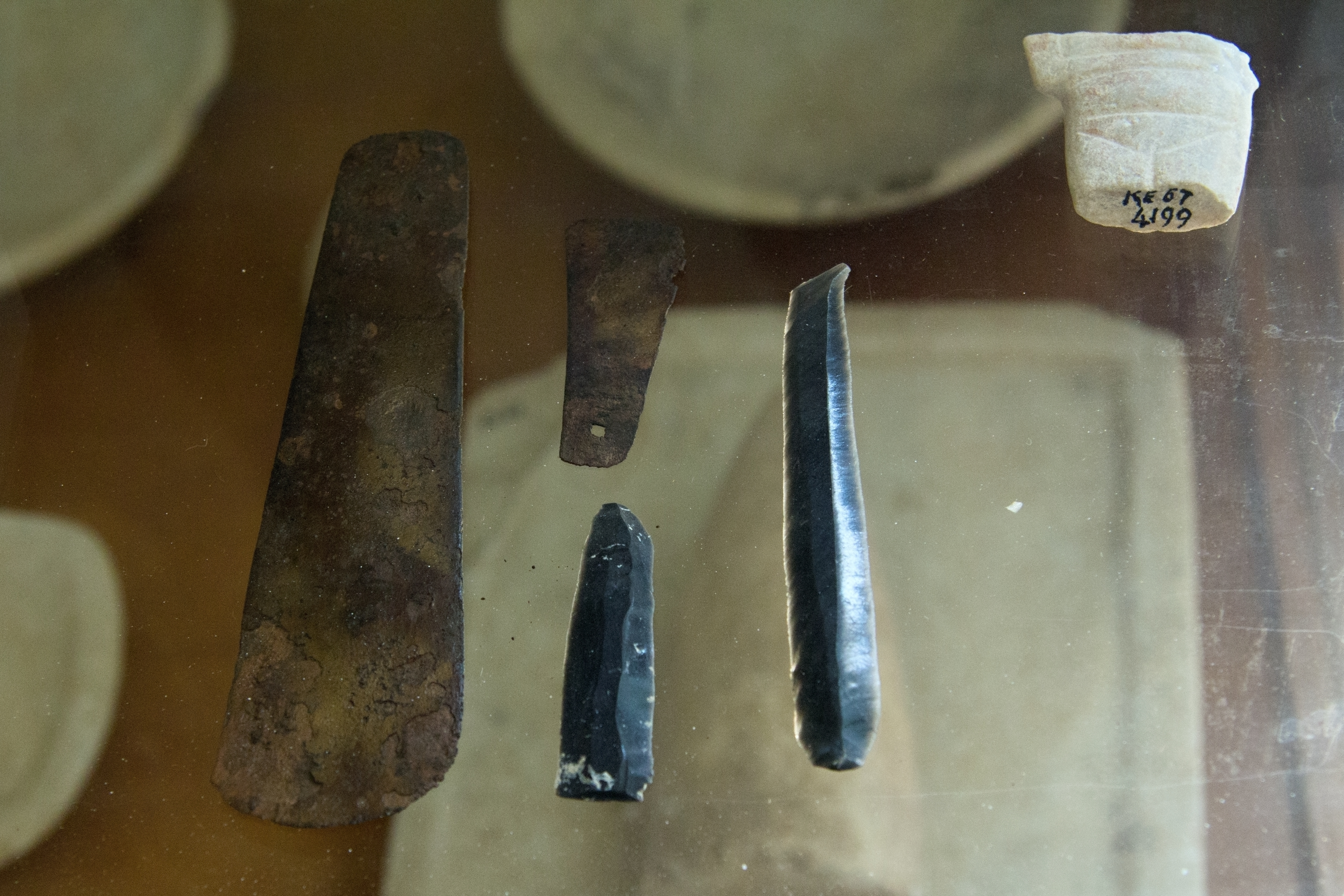
Cycladic bronze tools and obsidian blades, Naxos, 2800-2300 BC

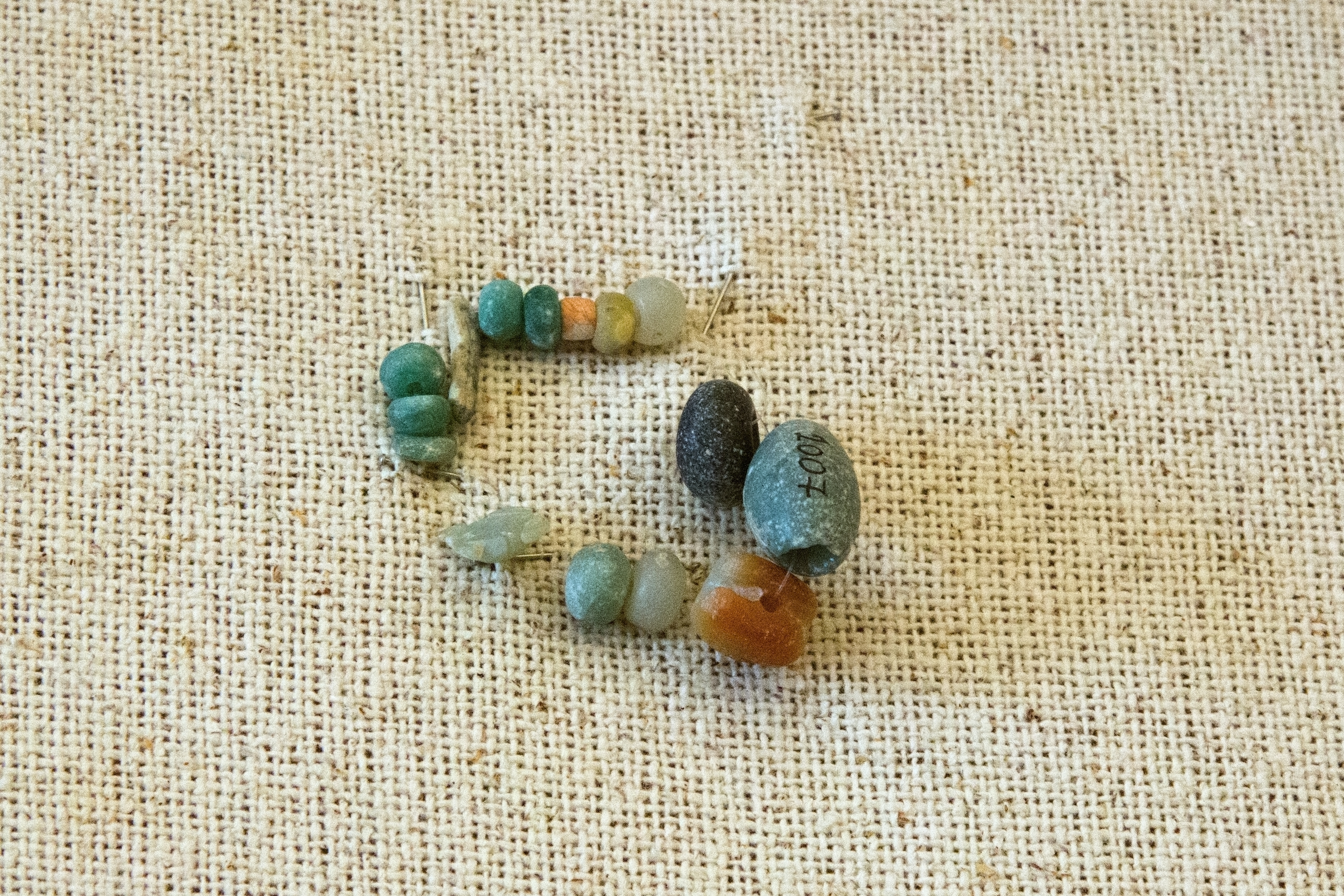
Cycladic jewellery, Naxos, 3200 – 2300 BC

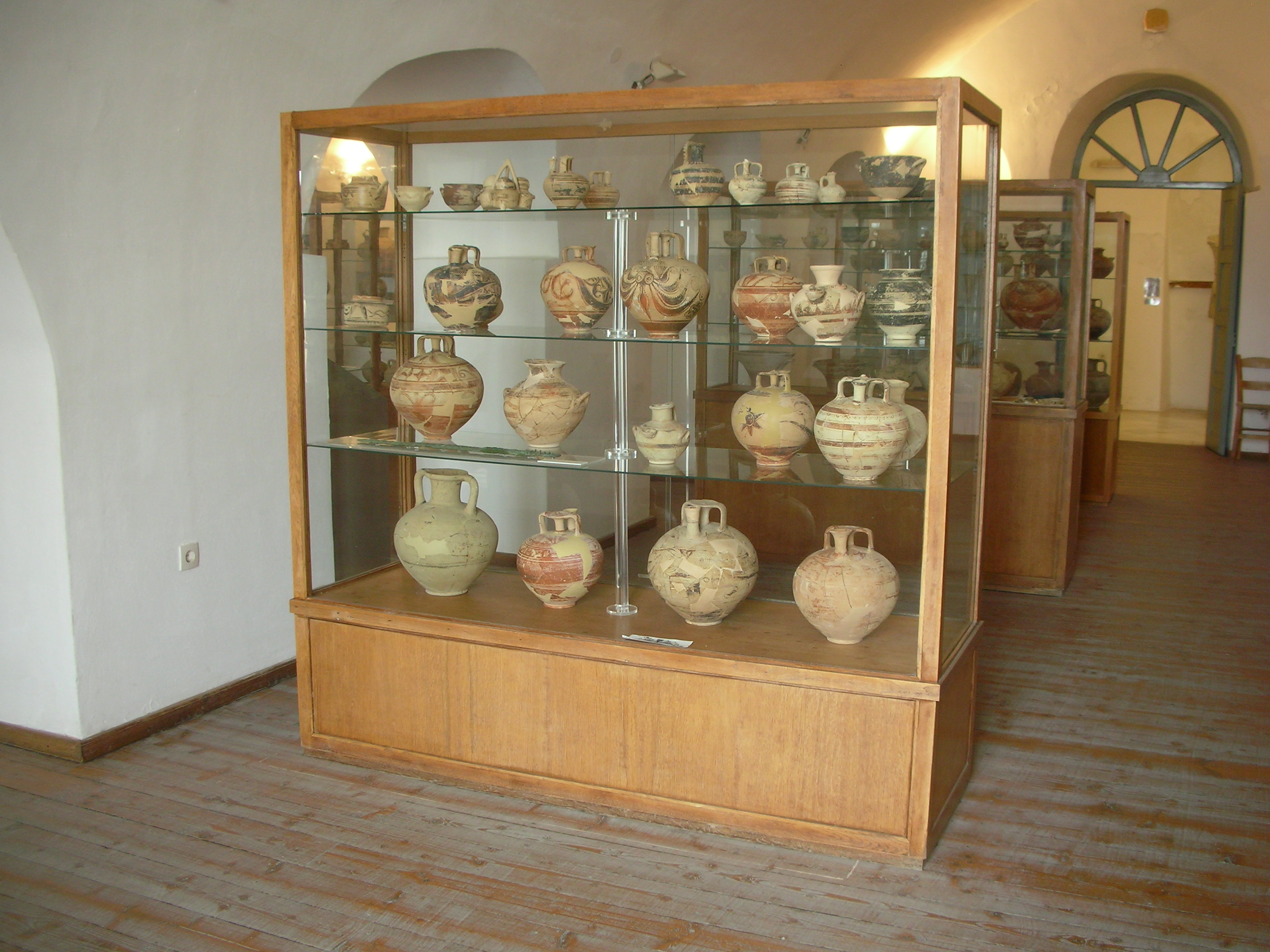
Cases of Late Cycladic art, Mycenaean pottery, Naxos, 12th century BC

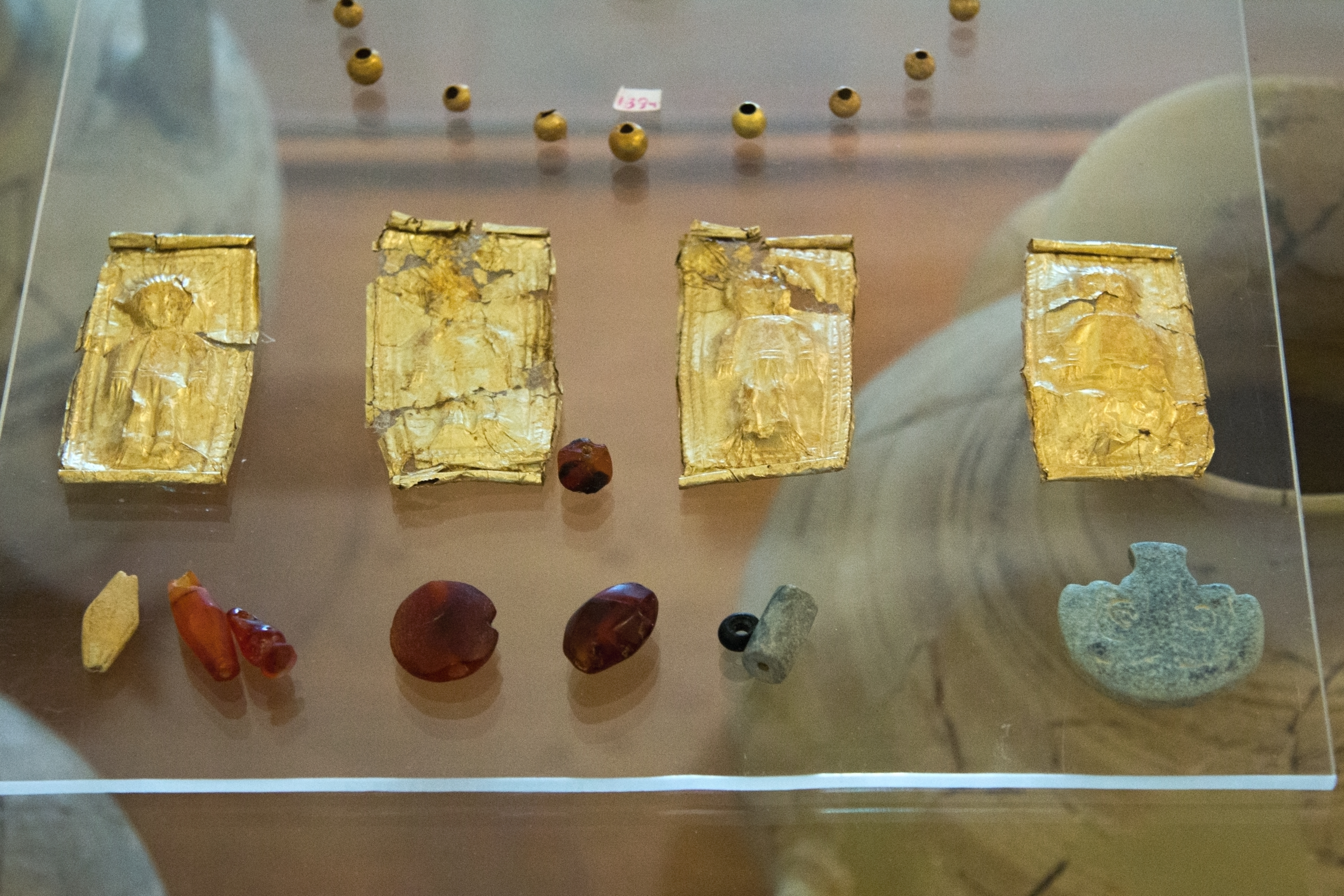
Jewellery from child grave, Kamini on Naxos, 12th century BC

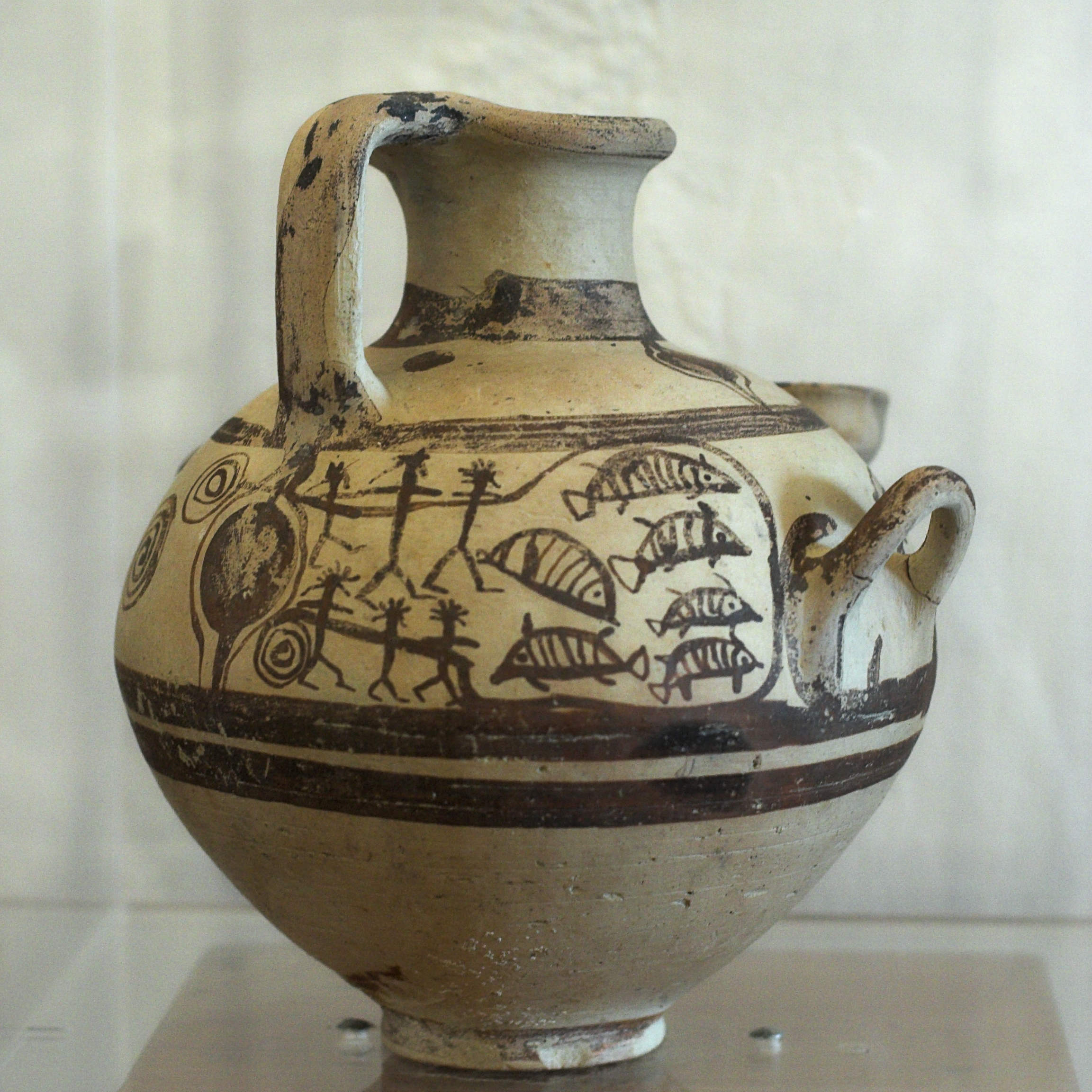
Mycenaean Hydria, fishing to the network, Naxos, 12th century BC

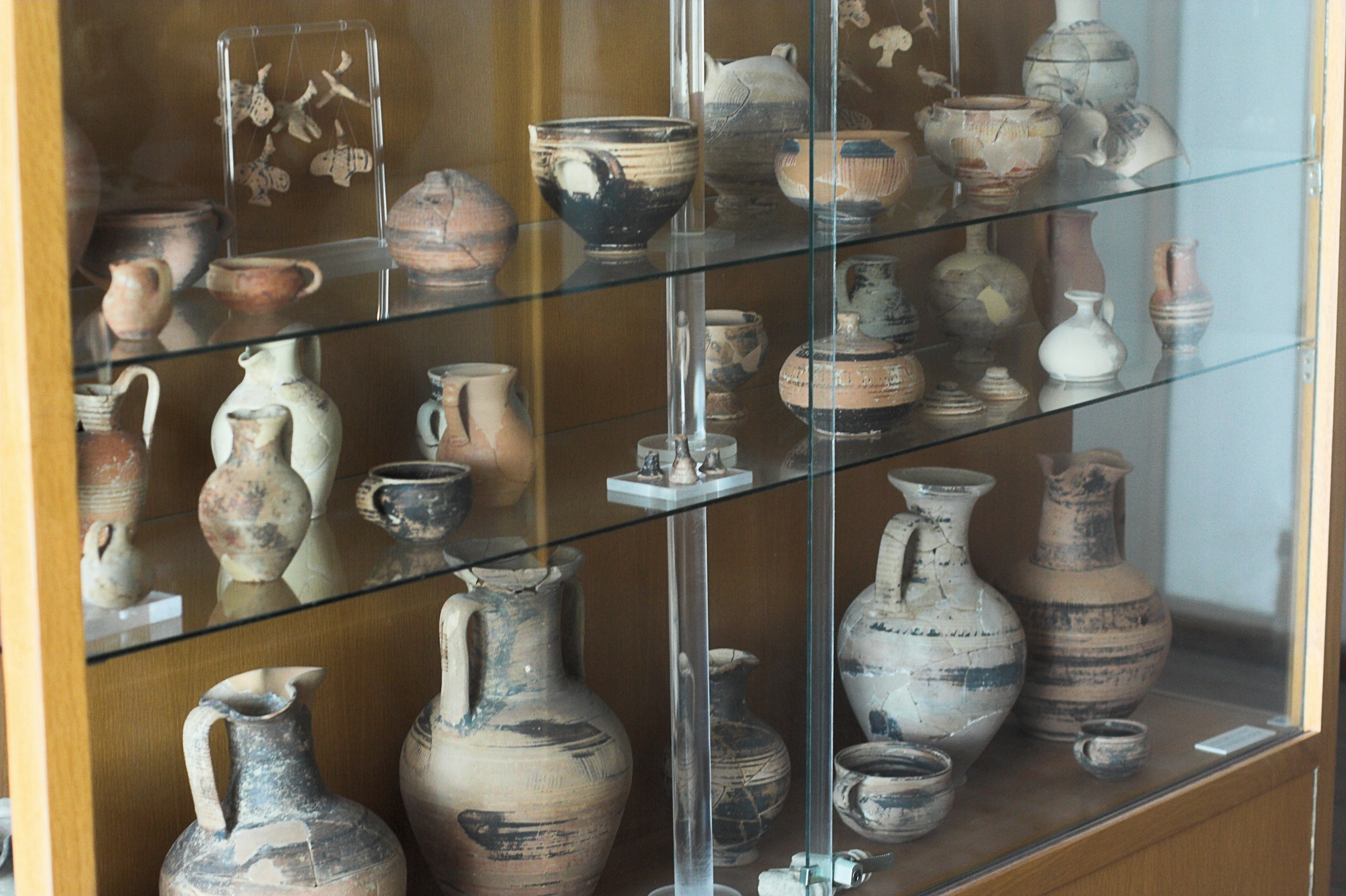
Room of Greek geometric pottery, 8th century BC

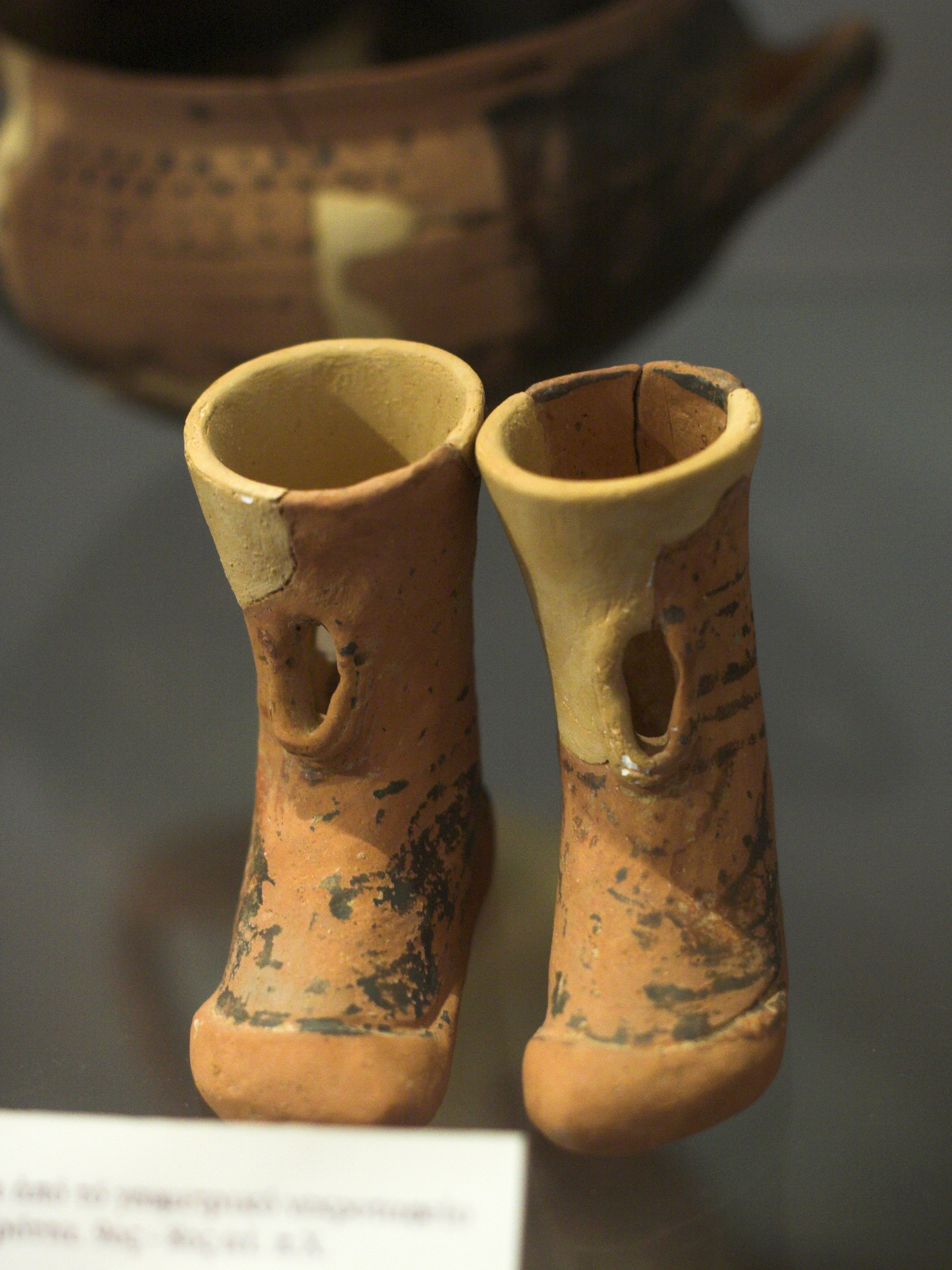
Terracotta boots of a wooden statue, Grotta on Naxos, 9th to 8 century BC

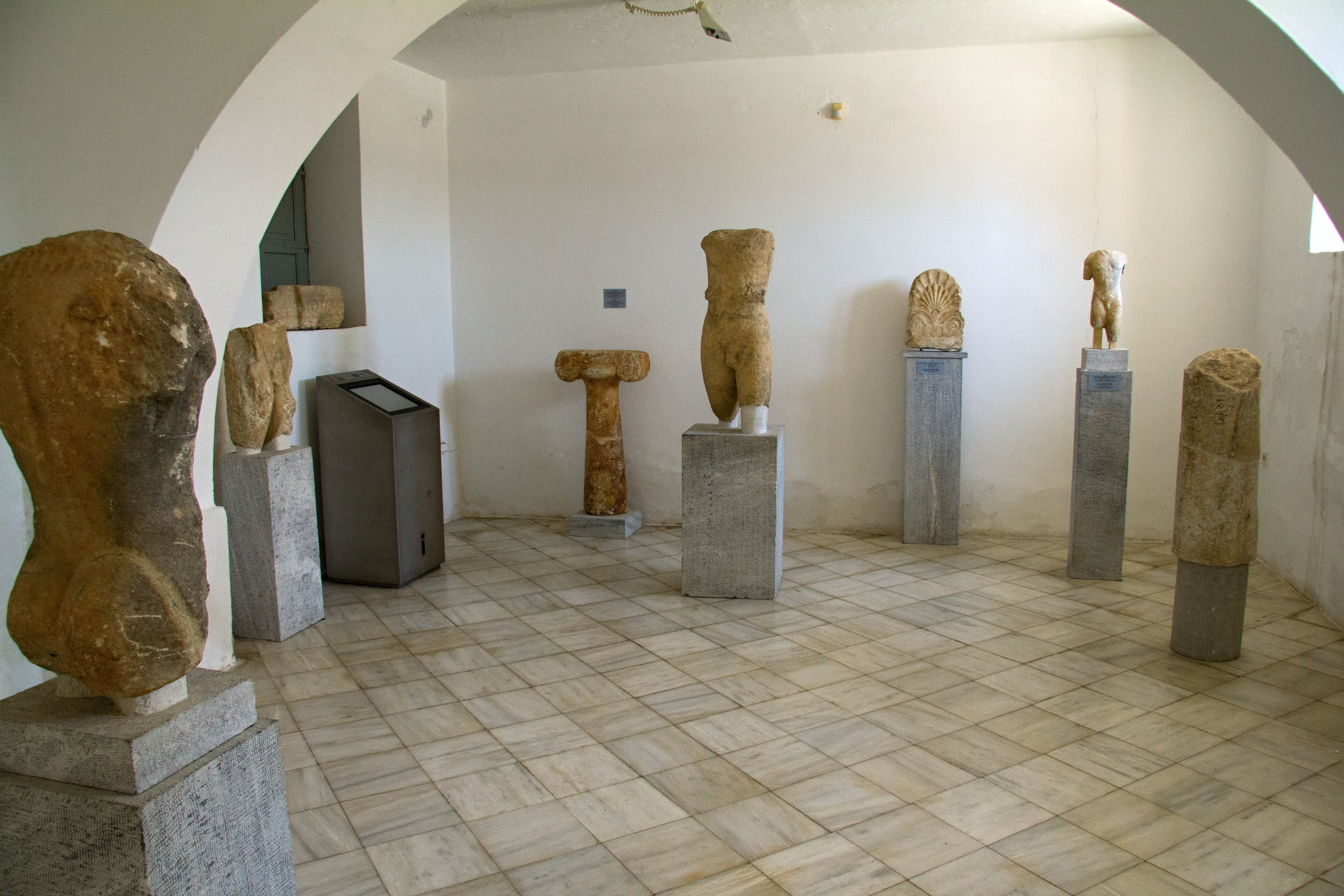
Room of kouroi, 650-450 BC

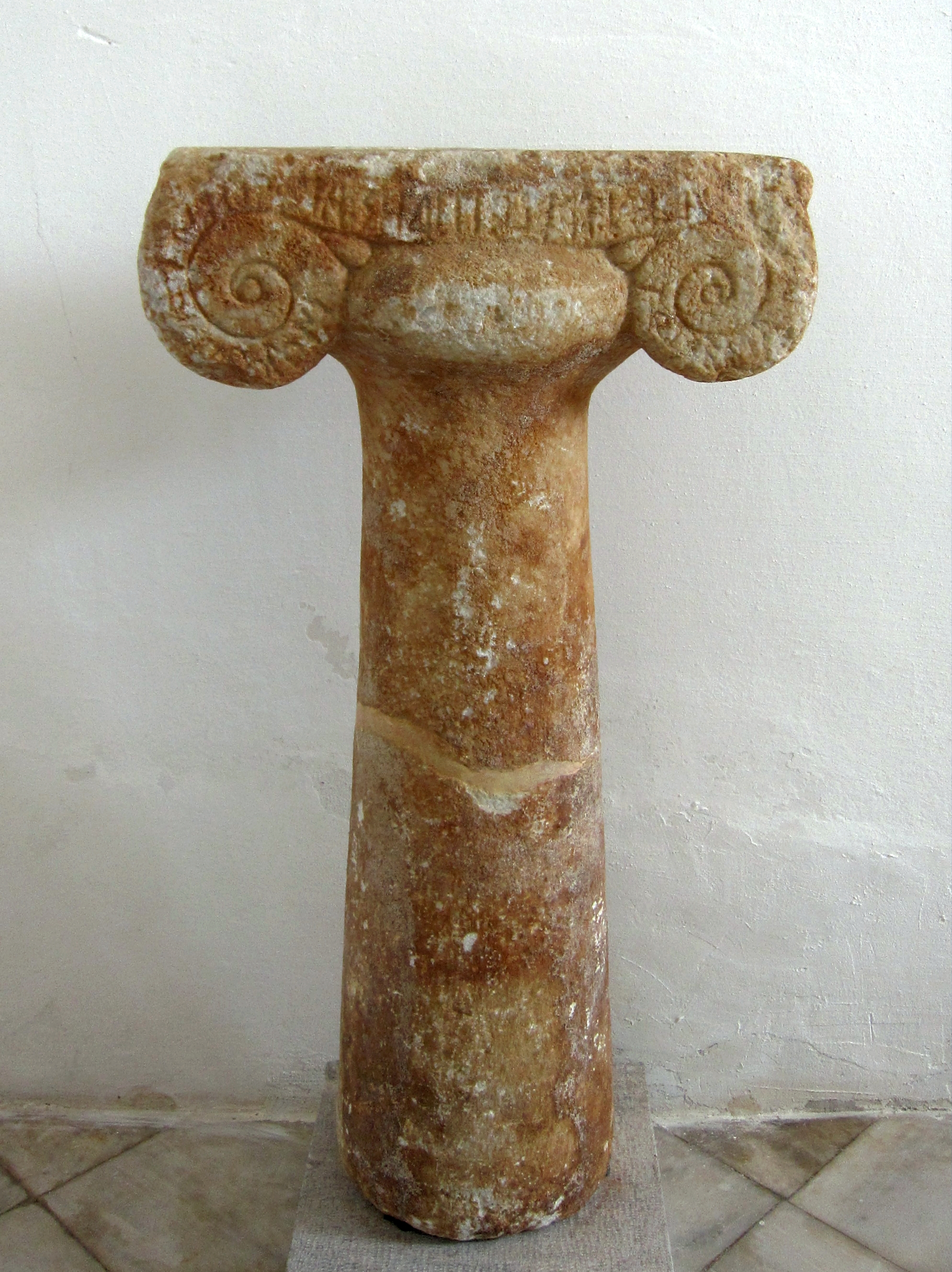
Offering vessel with inscription, Gyroulas on Naxos, late 7th century BC

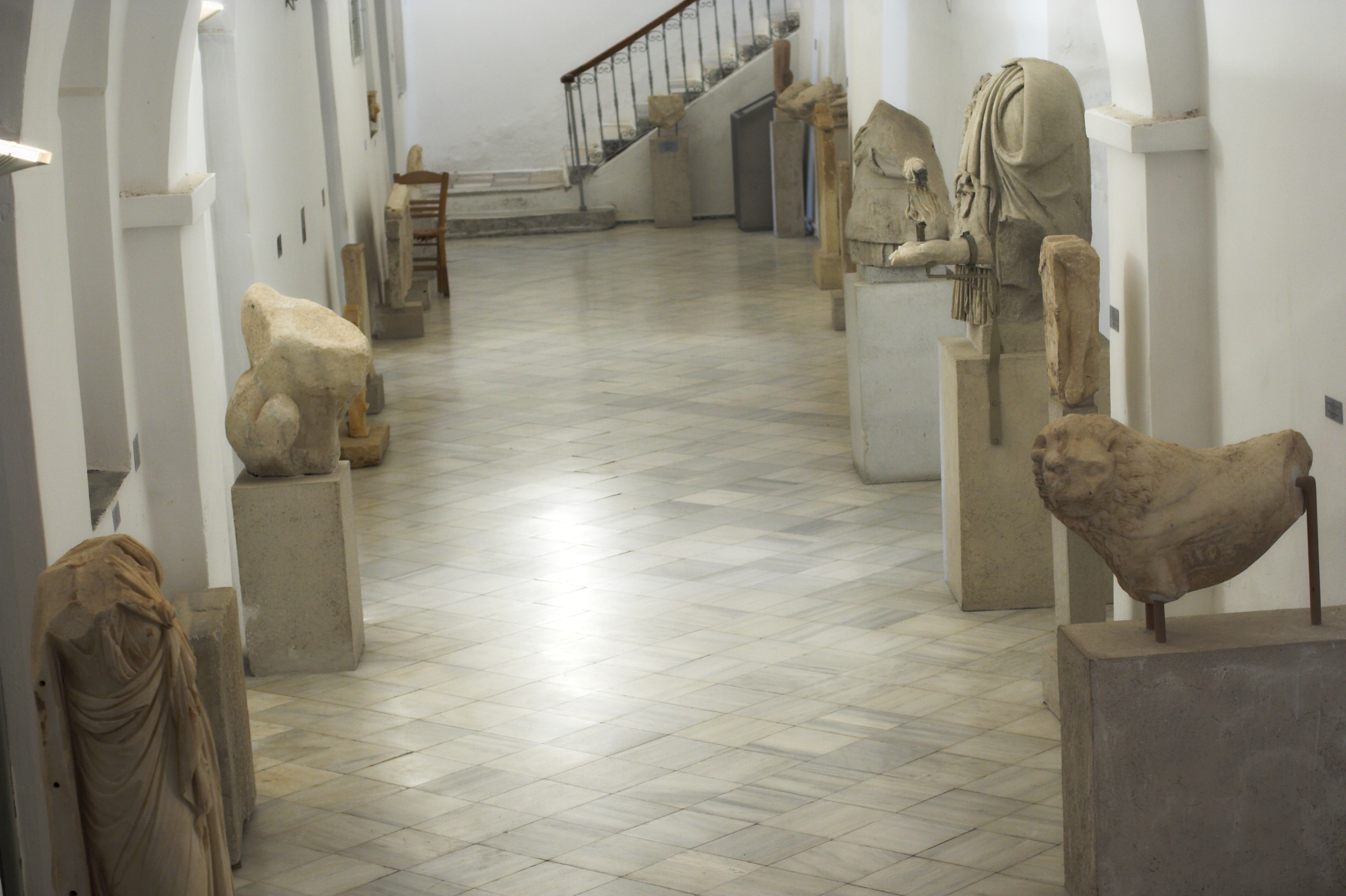
Corridor with sculptures

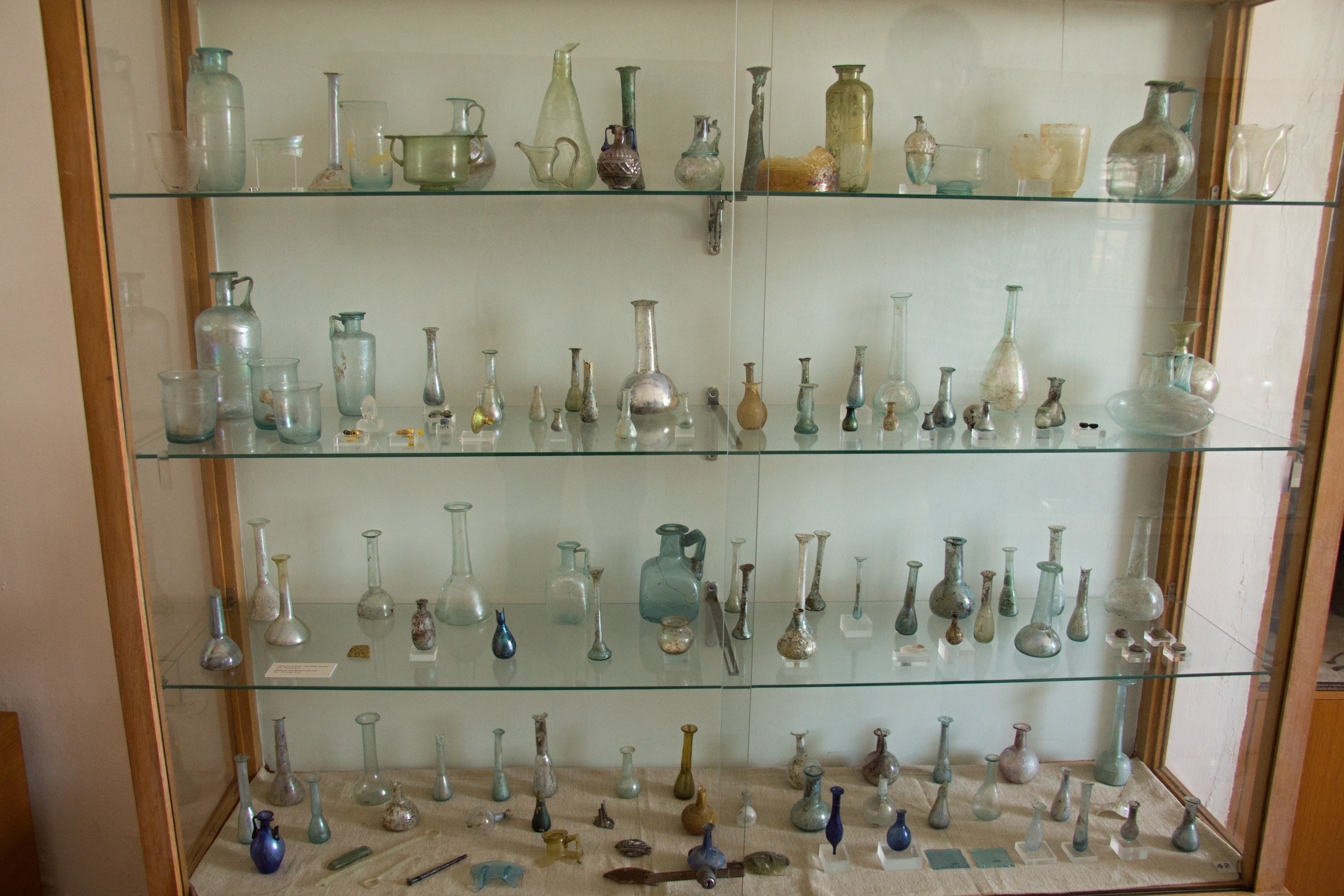
Roman Age glassware

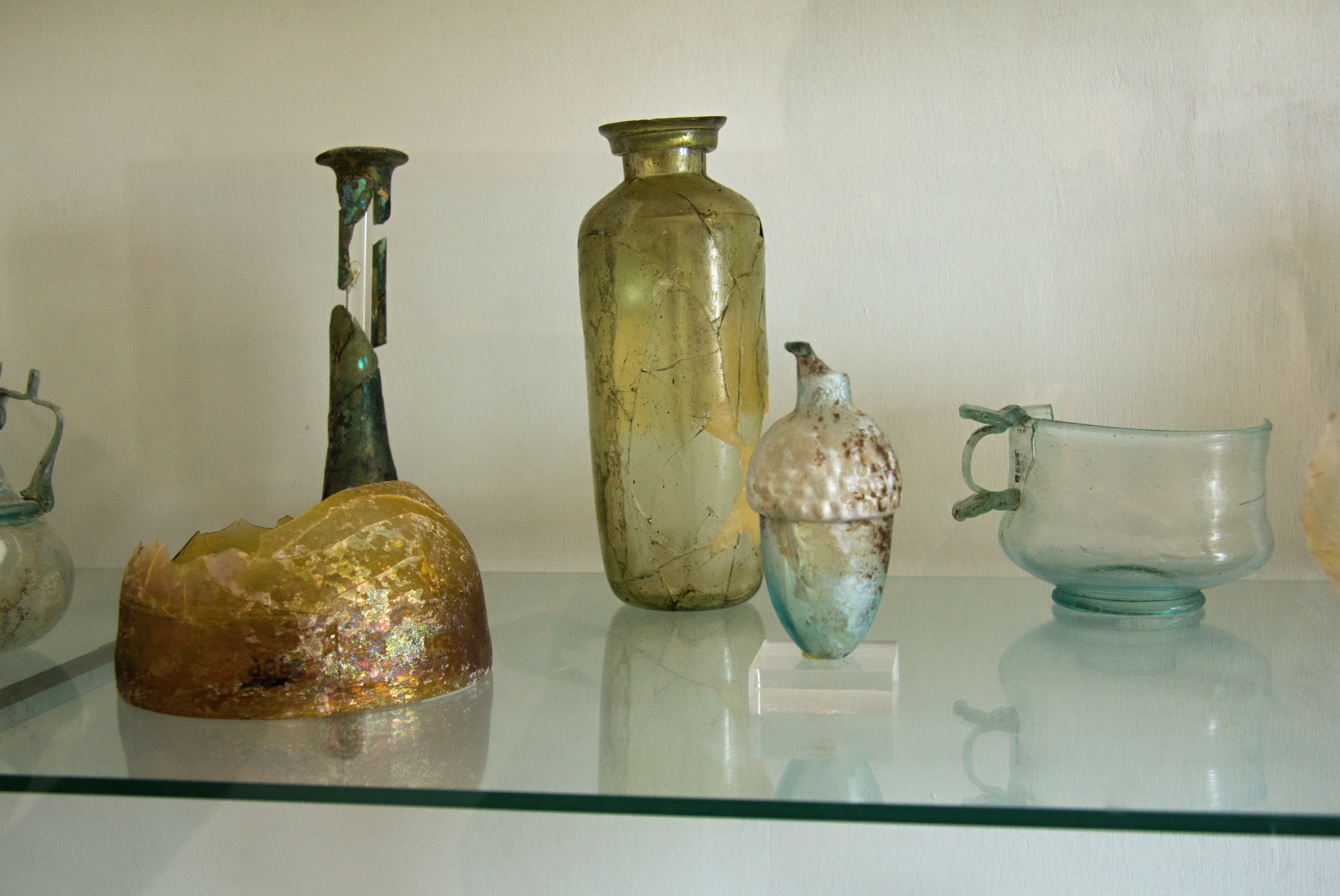
Roman Age glassware

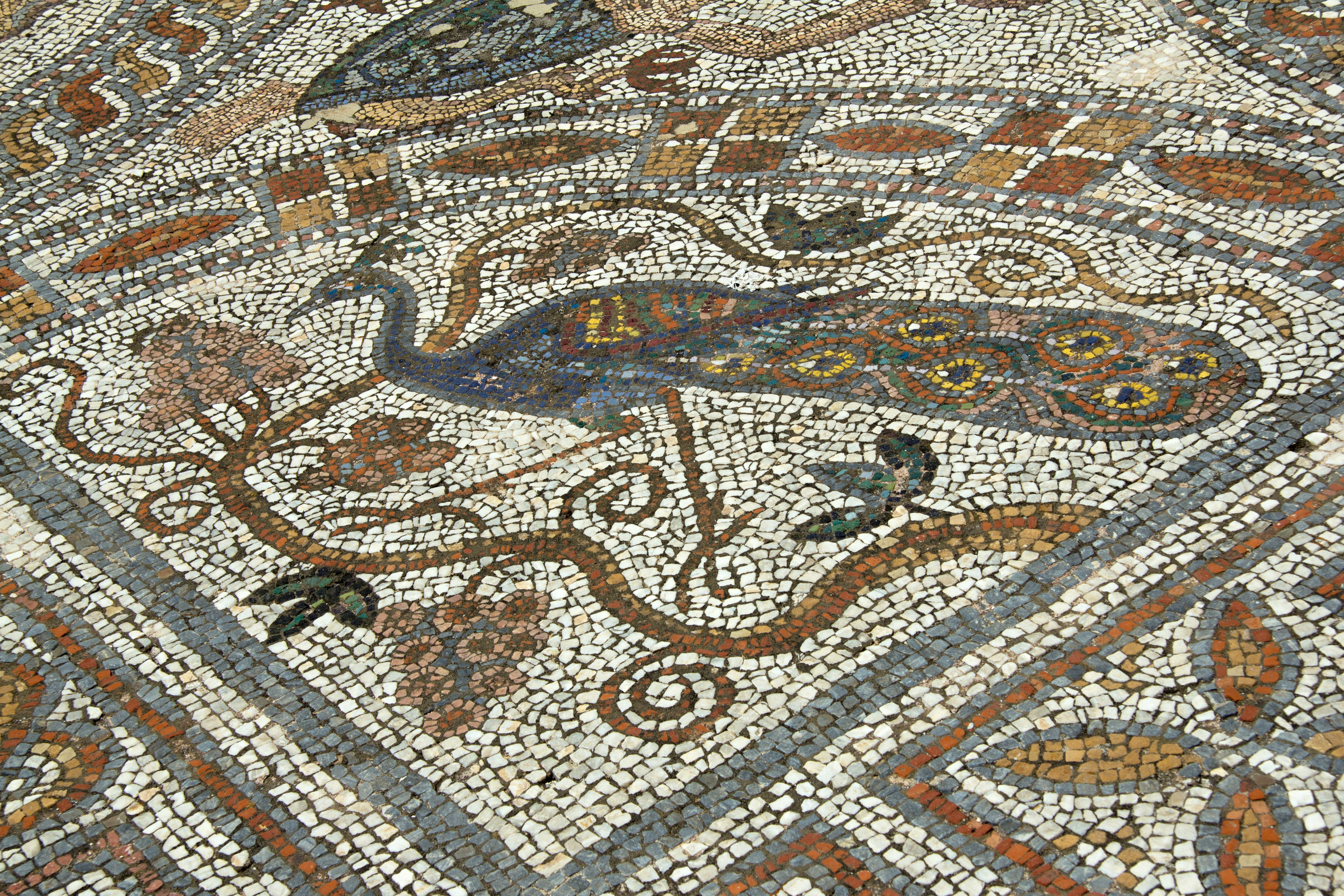
Mosaic floor, Aplomata on Naxos, Roman Age
