= Daskalio =

Greek islet in the Aegean Sea

Daskalio or Dhaskalio
Native name: Δασκαλιό
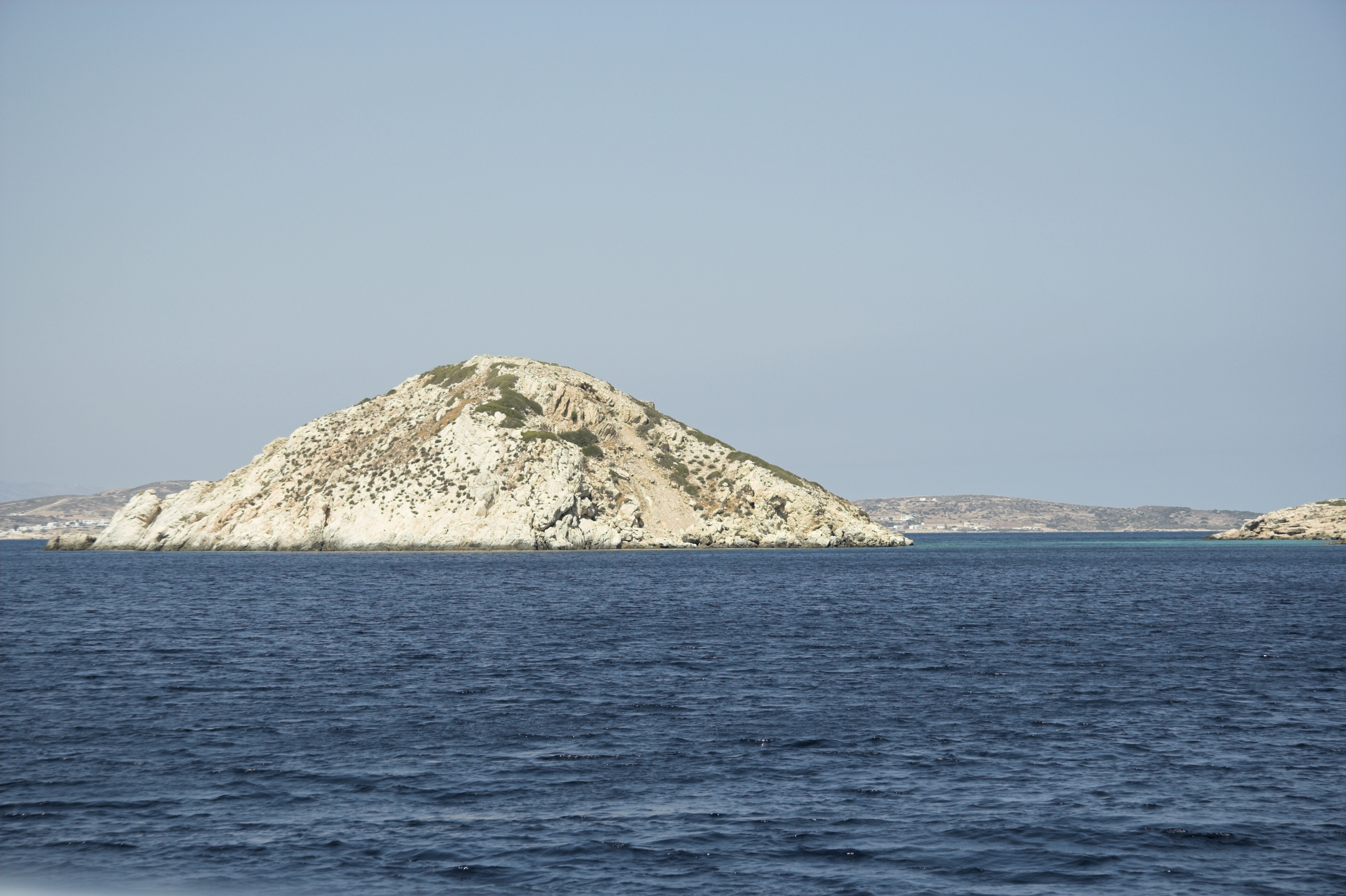

- Location within Greece

Geography
- Coordinates: 36.887°N 25.604°E
- Archipelago: Cyclades

Administration
- Greece
- Region: South Aegean
- Regional unit: Naxos

Demographics
- Population: 0

Daskalio or Dhaskalio (Greek: Δασκαλιό) is a tiny, uninhabited Greek islet in the Cyclades just off the west coast of the larger island Keros, approximately 150 metres in diameter. Formerly, it was a promontory of Keros, but is now a tiny islet because of sea level rise.

== Archeology ==
=== Early Bronze Age ===
The islet is believed to have been a religious center with numerous shrines and votive offerings, including intentionally broken statues, 1,500 imported stone disks, and 700 imported white pebbles.

Excavation by the Cambridge Keros Project, a joint endeavour of the University of Cambridge, the Ephorate of Antiquities of Cyclades, and the Cyprus Institute, in 2008 revealed a large Bronze Age settlement and ten years later researchers from the university found evidence of advanced metalworking workshops there, dating from 2500 BCE.

The island was extensively terraced with over 1,000 tons of marble quarried on the island of Naxos, some 10 km (6.2 mi) distant, enhancing its pyramidal shape. The lower levels featured a complex drainage system of water conduits, among the oldest in Europe. Plant remains in soil samples included grapes, olives, figs, almonds, emmer wheat and barley, likely imported from more arable locations.
