= Keros =

Uninhabited island in Greece

Native name: Κέρος
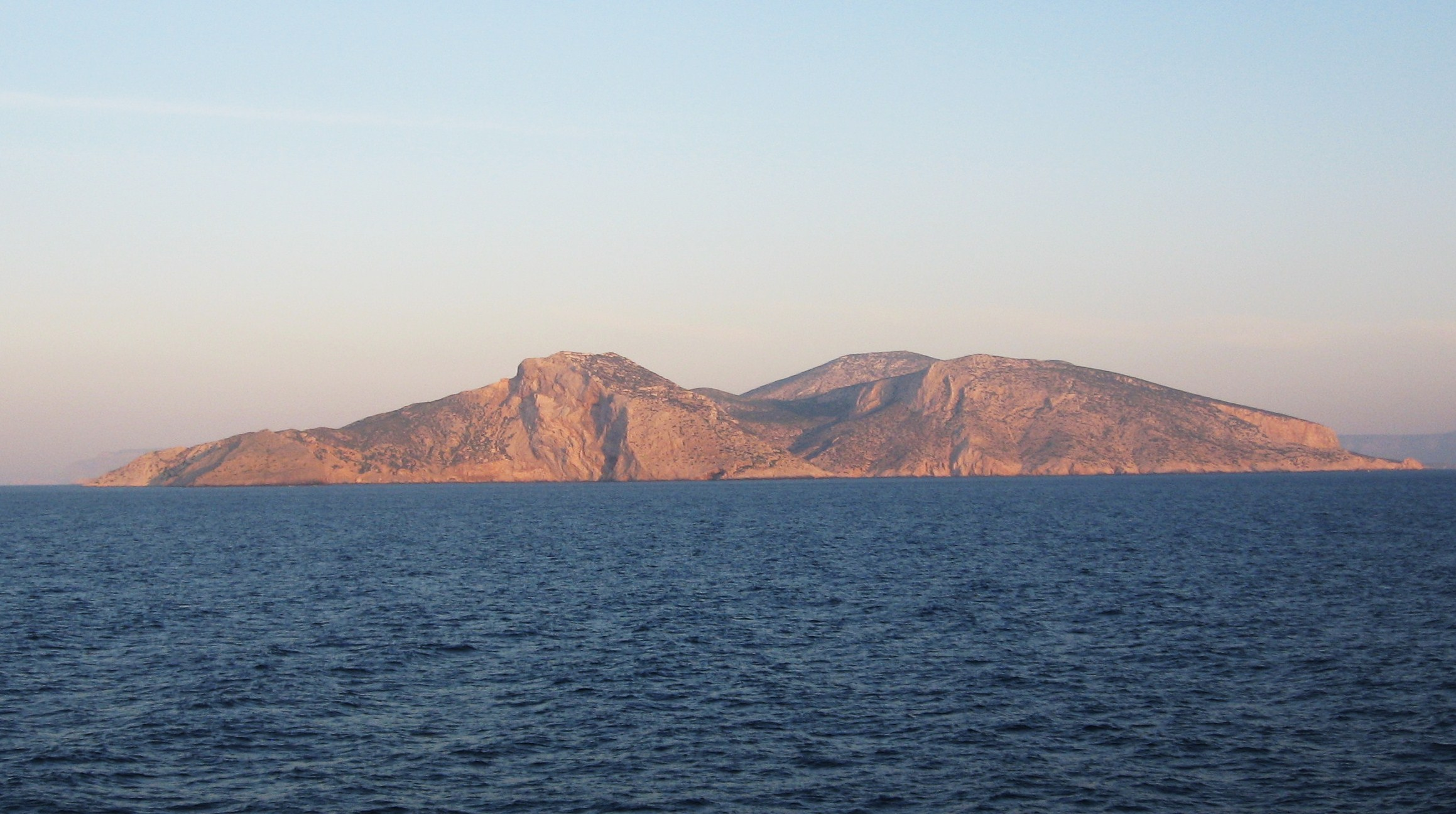
- Keros island, view from the north

- Location within Greece

Geography
- Coordinates: 36.89°N 25.65°E
- Archipelago: Cyclades
- Area: 15 km^{2} (5.8 sq mi)
- Highest elevation: 432 m (1417 ft)
- Highest point: Mt. Keros

Administration
- Greece
- Region: South Aegean
- Regional unit: Naxos

Demographics
- Population: 0 (2001)

Additional information
- Postal code: 843 00
- Area code: 22870
- Vehicle registration: EM

Keros (Greek: Κέρος; anciently, Keria or Kereia (Ancient Greek: Κέρεια)) is an uninhabited and unpopulated Greek island in the Cyclades about 10 km (6 mi) southeast of Naxos. Administratively it is part of the community of Koufonisia. It has an area of 15 km^{2} (6 sq mi) and its highest point is 432 m (1,417 ft). It was an important site to the Cycladic civilization that flourished around 2500 BC. It is now forbidden to land on Keros.

== Keros hoard ==
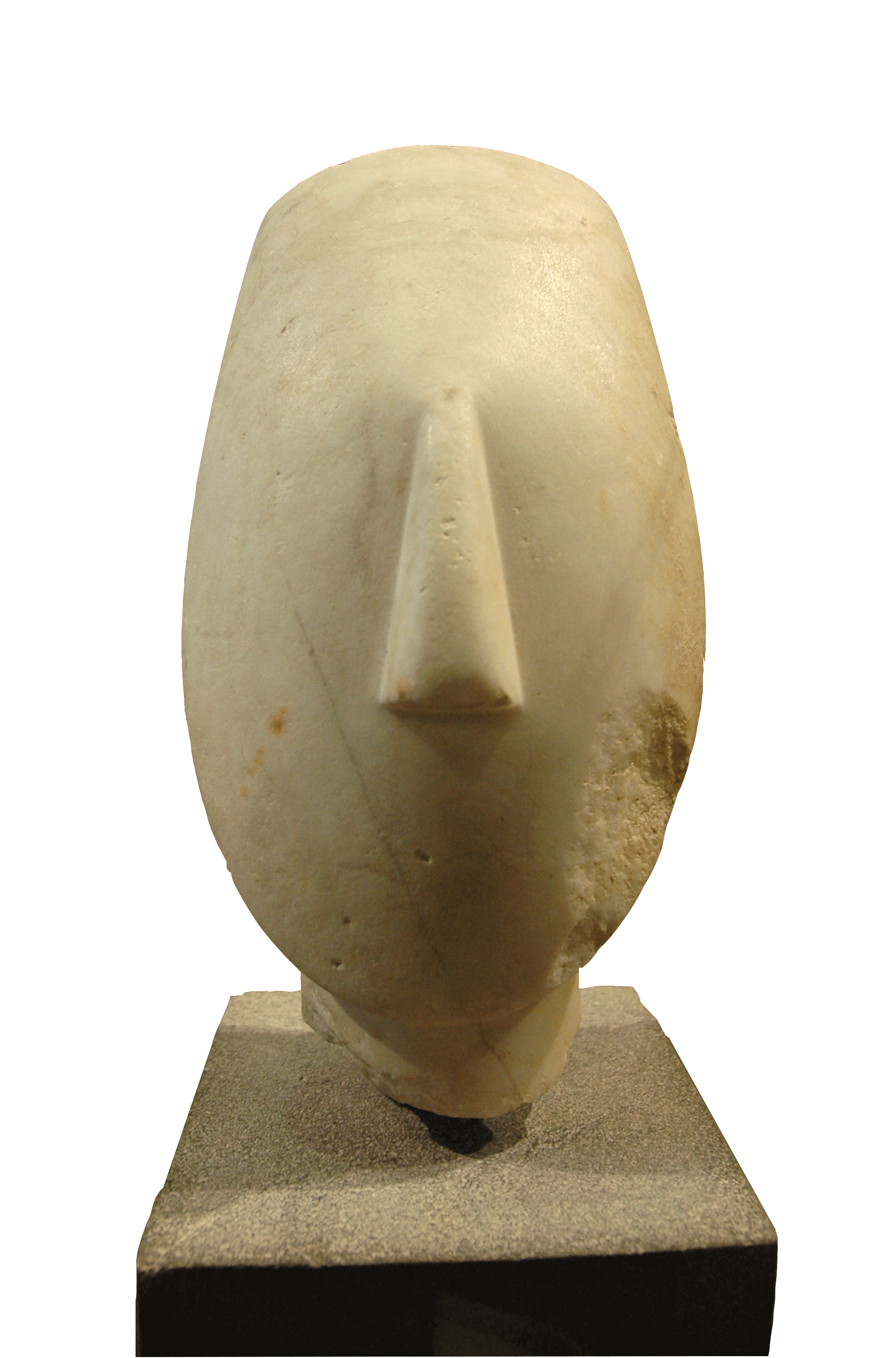
Head from the figure of a woman, 2700 BC–2300 BC, Keros culture

The "Keros Hoard" is a very large deposit of Cycladic figurines that was found on the island of Keros.

In 2006–2008, the Cambridge Keros Project, co-directed by Colin Renfrew with others, conducted excavations at Kavos on the west coast of the island. This general area is believed to be the source of the so-called "Keros Hoard" of fragmentary Cycladic figurines. The material excavated in 2006–2008 includes Cycladic figurines, vessels and other objects made of marble, all broken prior to deposition and most likely broken elsewhere and brought to Kavos for deposition. The lack of joining fragments shows that only a part of the broken material was deposited here, while ongoing studies of the pottery and other material show that material was brought from multiple sources for deposition here.

== Daskalio ==
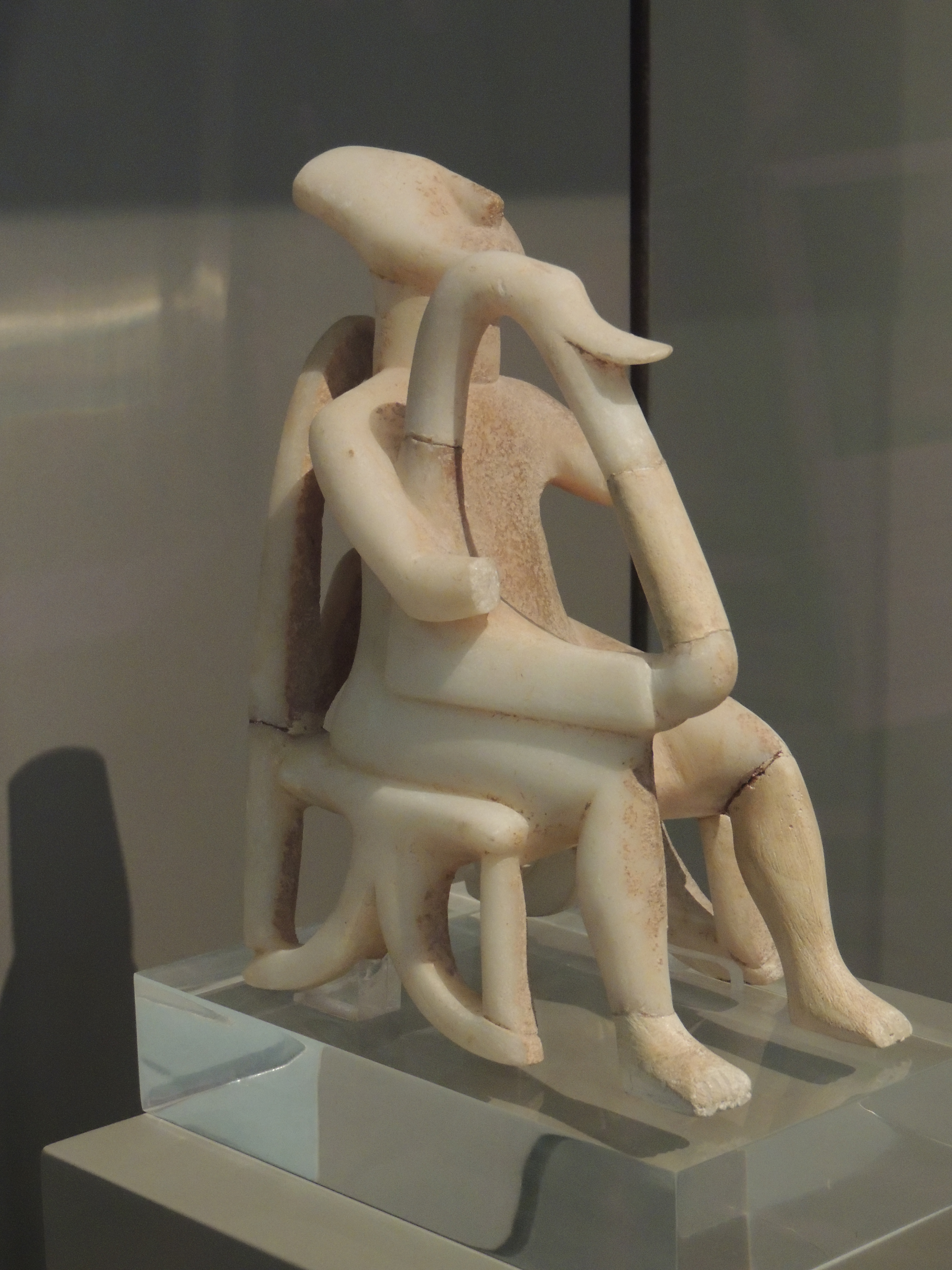
Harp player from Keros, 2600 BC. National Archaeological Museum, Athens

In 2007–2008, the same project identified and excavated a substantial Cycladic period settlement on the nearby island of Daskalio that was once attached to Keros, but is now a tiny islet because of sea level rise. A large area has been excavated, revealing a substantial building 16 metres long and 4 metres wide — the largest from this period in the Cyclades — within which was discovered the 'Daskalio hoard' comprising a chisel, an axe-adze and a shaft-hole axe of copper or bronze. In addition to excavation, survey of the islet showed that most of its surface — a total of 7000 square meters — was occupied during the Early Bronze Age, making this the largest site in the Cyclades. Specialist studies for the geomorphology, geology, petrology, ceramic petrology, metallurgy and environmental aspects (botanical and faunal remains, phytoliths) ensued.

In 2012, the activities at this site were dated 2750 to 2300 BC, which precedes any identified worship of gods in the Aegean.

In 2018, excavations revealed the remains of massive terraced walls and giant gleaming structures on the islet. The structures were built using 1,000 tons of stone, turning the headland, which measures just 500 feet (150 m) across, into a single, giant "step pyramid". Researchers found evidence of complex drainage tunnels and traces of advanced metalworking. The researchers say the remains make the island one of the most impressive archaeological sites of the Aegean Sea during the Early Bronze Age. The excavations show that the headland of Dhaskalio was almost entirely covered by remarkable monuments. Archaeologists believe that ancient Greeks embarked on at least 3,500 maritime voyages to transport between 7,000 and 10,000 tonnes of white marble among islands, in order to construct the aforementioned pyramid. Researchers said that "[t]he island is naturally pyramid-shaped, but one should not refer to the island as a pyramid — a pyramid is a completely artificial construction."

== Keros-Syros culture ==
Keros-Syros culture is named after the two islands in the Cyclades—Keros and Syros. This culture flourished during the Early Cycladic II period (ca 2700-2300 BC). Some of the best preserved sites of this culture are at Kea and Ios, located not far from Keros.

Some of the important artifacts of this culture are the so-called frying pans – shallow circular vessels or bowls with a decorated base. The use of metal became widespread during this period.

== See also ==
- Daskalio

== Bibliography ==
- Cyprian Broodbank: An Island Archaeology of the Early Cyclades. Cambridge University Press, 2002, ISBN 0521528445
- Mariya Ivanova: Befestigte Siedlungen auf dem Balkan, in der Ägäis und in Westanatolien, ca. 5000-2000 v. Chr.. Waxmann Verlag, 2008, ISBN 3830919379
- Colin Renfrew, Christos Doumas, Lila Marangou, Giorgos Gavelas: Dhaskalio [sic] Kavos, Keros: The Investigations of 1987–88. In: N. J. Brodie, J. Doole, G. Gavalas, C. Renfrew (Hrsg.): Horizon – a colloquium on the prehistory of the Cyclades. Cambridge, McDonald Institute for Archaeological Research, 2008, ISBN 978-1-902937-36-6, S. 107–113
- Panayiota Sotorakopoulou: Dhaskalio [sic] Kavos, Keros: The pottery from the Investigations of the 1960s. In: N. J. Brodie, J. Doole, G. Gavalas, C. Renfrew (Hrsg.): Horizon – a colloquium on the prehistory of the Cyclades. Cambridge, McDonald Institute for Archaeological Research, 2008, ISBN 978-1-902937-36-6, S. 115–120
- Colin Renfrew et al.: Keros – Dhaskelion [sic] and Kavos, Early Cycladic Stronghold and Ritual Center. Preliminary Report of the 2006 and 2007 Excavation Seasons. In: The Annual of the British School at Athens 102, 2007, S. 103–136 (1. Teil der Vorberichte zum Cambridge Keros Project)
- Colin Renfrew et al.: The Early Cycladic Settlement at Dhaskalio [sic], Keros – Preliminary Report of the 2008 Excavation Season. In: The Annual of the British School at Athens, 104, 2009, S. 27–47 (2. Teil der Vorberichte zum Cambridge Keros Project)
