= Immanuel (name) =

Emmanuel/Immanuel/Emanuel
- Pronunciation: /ɪˈmænjuəl/ in singing /-ɛl/ French: [ɛmanɥɛl] Immanuel; German: [ɪˈmaːnu̯eːl] Emanuel; Spanish: [emaˈnwel] Polish: [ɛmaˈnu.ɛl]
- Gender: Male
- Language: Hebrew language

Origin
- Meaning: "God with us" עִמָּנוּאֵל (Imānu‘el)
- Region of origin: United Kingdom of Israel (ancient)

Other names
- Alternative spelling: Emmanuel, Emmanuil, Emmanouil, Imanu'el
- Variant forms: Manuel, Imanol, Emanuelle
- Nicknames: Manny, Manolo

Immanuel is a name originating in the biblical Hebrew name עִמָּנוּאֵל, meaning "God with us". The name, now common to both Jewish and Christian naming traditions, originates with the biblical character Immanuel, with numerous variants appearing over time, including first names Amanuel (አማኑኤል) in Ethiopia and Eritrea, Emanuele in Italy, Imanol in Basque, Manuel in Portuguese and Spanish, Emmanouil (Εμμανουήλ) in Greek, and a French female variation, Emmanuelle.

== Given name ==
- Immanuel Aboab (c. 1555–1628), Portuguese Jewish scholar
- Immanuel Alm (1767–1809), Finnish painter
- Immanuel Bäck (1876–1939), Finnish clergyman and politician
- Immanuel Benveniste (1608–c. 1660), Italian Jewish printer
- Immanuel Bloch (born 1972), German experimental physicist
- Immanuel Bomze, (born 1958), Austrian mathematician
- Immanuel Bonfils (c. 1300–1377), French-Jewish mathematician and astronomer
- Immanuel Bourne (1590–1672), English cleric
- Immanuel Casto (born 1983), stage name of Manuel Cuni, Italian singer-songwriter and activist
- Immanuel De Reuse (born 1971), Belgian-Flemish politician
- Immanuel Estermann (1900–1973), Jewish German-born nuclear physicist and professor
- Immanuel Faisst (1823–1894), German composer
- Immanuel Feyi-Waboso (born 2002), Welsh rugby union player
- Immanuel Frances (1618–1703), Italian Jewish poet and rabbinical scholar
- Imanuel Geiss (1931–2012), German historian
- Immanuel Gottlieb Huschke (1761–1828), German classical philologist
- Immanuel Hai Ricchi (1688–1743), Italian rabbi, kabbalist and poet
- Immanuel Halton (1628–1699), English astronomer and mathematician
- Immanuel Heita (born 1992), Namibian footballer
- Immanuel Hermann Fichte (1796–1879), German philosopher
- Immanuel Höhn (born 1991), German footballer
- Immanuel C. Y. Hsu (1923–2005), Chinese sinologist
- Immanuel Iheanacho (born c. 2008), American college football player
- Immanuel Jakobovits, Baron Jakobovits (1921–1999), German rabbi
- Immanuel Johann Gerhard Scheller (1735–1803), German classical philologist and lexicographer
- Immanuel Kant (1724–1804), German philosopher
- Immanuel Kauluma Elifas (1934–2019), Namibian chief
- Immanuel Klette (1918–1988), American bomber pilot and squadron commander
- Imanuel Lalthazuala (born 1994), Indian footballer
- Imanuel Lauster (1873–1948), German engineer and businessman
- Immanuel Löw (1854–1944), Hungarian rabbi, scholar, botanist and politician
- Immanuel McElroy (born 1980), American basketball player
- Immanuel Mifsud (born 1967), Maltese writer
- Immanuel Mulunga, Namibian businessman
- Immanuel Munk (1852–1903), German physiologist
- Immanuel Naidjala (born 1984), Namibian boxer
- Immanuel Ness (born 1958), American scholar, activist and professor
- Immanuel Ngatjizeko (1952–2022), Namibian politician
- Immanuel Nobel (1801–1872), Swedish engineer, architect, inventor and industrialist
- Immanuel Obeng-Darko (born 1952), Ghanaian politician
- Immanuel Oscar Menahem Deutsch (1829–1873), German Jewish scholar
- Imanuel Padwa (born 1984), Indonesian footballer
- Immanuel Pherai (born 2001), Dutch footballer
- Immanuel Quickley (born 1999), American basketball player
- Immanuel the Roman (1261–c. 1335), Italian Jewish poet and author
- Imanuel Rumbiak (born 1998), Indonesian footballer
- Immanuel Shifidi (1929–1986), Namibian activist
- Immanuel Stark (born 1994), German cyclist
- Immanuel Tremellius (1510–1580), Italian Jewish convert
- Immanuel Velikovsky (1895–1979), Russian-American psychoanalyst, writer and catastrophist
- Immanuel Wallerstein (1930–2019), American sociologist and economic historian
- Imanuel Wanggai (born 1988), Indonesian footballer
- Immanuel Wilkins (born 1997), American jazz saxophonist
- Immanuel Winkler (1886–1932), German pastor

== Surname ==
- Angelina Immanuel (born 1992), Namibian youth activist and educator
- Benjamin Immanuel, Canadian actor, film director and screenwriter
- Esrom Immanuel, Fijian politician
- Rebecca Immanuel (born 1970), German actress
- Stella Immanuel (born 1965), Cameroonian-American physician and pastor
