= Emanuil =

Emanuil is a male given name. It may refer to:

- Emanuil A. Vidinski (born 1978), Bulgarian writer, poet, and musician
- Emanuil Dyulgerov (born 1955), former hammer thrower from Bulgaria
- Emanuil Gavriliță (1847–1910), lawyer, journalist and activist from Bessarabia
- Emanuil Manolov (1860–1902), Bulgarian composer
- Emanuil Vaskidovich (1795–1875), Bulgarian National Revival enlightener

== History and origin ==
Emanuil is a Bulgarian form of the name Emmanuel.

"God is with us" is the meaning of the Hebrew name "Immanu'el," which is derived from the words "with" and "God" in the Hebrew alphabet. The Messiah was known by this name in the Old Testament. Although it has not been widely used, it has been used in England from the 16th century under the names Emmanuel and Immanuel.

In continental Europe, particularly in Spain and Portugal (with the variants Manuel and Manoel), the name has historically been more popular.

== See also ==
- Emanuil Gojdu National College, high school located in Oradea, Romania
- Ehmaniella
- Emanu-El (disambiguation)
- Emanuel (disambiguation)
- Emanuele
- Emmanuelle
- Emmanuelli
