= Emanu-El =

Emanu-El, Temple Emanu-El, Congregation Emanu-El, or variants may refer to:

== United States ==
- Temple Emanu-El (Birmingham, Alabama)
- Temple Emanu-El (Tucson), Arizona, formerly Temple Emanu-El
- Temple Emanuel of Tempe, Arizona
- Congregation Emanu-El (San Francisco), California
- Temple Emanuel (Beverly Hills, California)
- Temple Emanuel (Denver), Colorado
- Temple Emanuel (Pueblo, Colorado)
- Temple Emanu-El (Palm Beach, Florida)
- Temple Emanu-El (Honolulu), Hawaii
- Temple Emanuel (Davenport, Iowa)
- Temple Emanuel (Kensington, Maryland)
- Temple Emanuel Sinai (Worcester, Massachusetts)
- Temple Emanuel (Grand Rapids, Michigan)
- Temple Emanuel (Creve Coeur, Missouri)
- Temple Emanu-El (Helena, Montana)
- Congregation Kol Ami (Cherry Hill, New Jersey), formerly Temple Emanuel
- Temple Emanu-El of West Essex, New Jersey
- Congregation Emanu-El of New York
  - Temple Emanu-El (New York, 1868)
  - Temple Emanu-El of New York (1930)
- Temple Emanu-El (Long Beach, New York)
- Temple Emanu-El (Staten Island, New York)
- Congregation Emanuel (Statesville, North Carolina)
- Temple Emanuel (Beaumont, Texas)
- Temple Emanu-El (Dallas), Texas
- Congregation Emanu-El B'ne Jeshurun, River Hills, Wisconsin

== Other places ==
- Emanuel Synagogue (Sydney), Australia
- Congregation Emanu-El (Victoria, British Columbia), Canada
- Temple Emanu-El-Beth Sholom, Westmount, Quebec, Canada
- Beit Emanuel, Johannesburg, South Africa

== See also ==
- Emanuel (disambiguation)
- Emmanuel (disambiguation)
- Immanuel (disambiguation)
- J. The Jewish News of Northern California, formerly The Emanu-El
