= Manny =

Manny is a given name or common nickname for the given names Manuel, Manuela, Herman, Norman, Manfred, and others.

It may refer to:

== People ==
- Manny Acta (born 1969), Dominican Major League Baseball player, manager and coach
- Manny Alexander (born 1971), Dominican former Major League Baseball player
- Manny Aparicio (born 1995), Canadian soccer player
- Manny Aragon (born 1947), former New Mexico State Senator, later convicted of conspiracy to defraud
- Manny Bañuelos (born 1991), Mexican pitcher in Major League Baseball
- Manny Charlton (1941–2022), founding member and lead guitarist of the Scottish hard rock band Nazareth
- Manny Corpas (born 1982), Panamanian pitcher in Major League Baseball and the Mexican Baseball League
- Manny Coto (fl. 1988–present), Cuban-American film and television writer, director and producer
- Manny Curtis (1911–1984), American songwriter born Emanuel Kurtz
- Manny Delcarmen (born 1982), American pitcher in the Mexican Baseball League
- Manny Diaz (disambiguation)
- Manny Elias (born 1953), Indian-born English drummer, original drummer of Tears for Fears
- Manny Fernandez (disambiguation)
- Manny González (soccer) (born 1990), Colombian-American soccer player
- Manny Jacinto (born 1987), Filipino-born Canadian actor
- Manny Jones (born 1999), American football player
- Manny Lawson (born 1984), American National Football League player
- Manny Lehman (computer scientist) (1925–2010), German-born British professor of computer science
- Manny Machado (born 1992), Dominican-American Major League Baseball player
- Manny Malhotra (born 1980), Canadian National Hockey League player
- Manny Marroquin (born 1971), Guatemalan-born American mixing engineer
- Manny Martínez (baseball) (born 1970), Dominican Major League Baseball player
- Manny Mota (born 1938), Dominican Major League Baseball player
- Manny Muscat (born 1984), Australian-born Maltese footballer
- Manny Oquendo (1931–2009), American percussionist
- Manny Pacquiao (born 1978), Filipino former boxer and politician
- Manny Paner (born 1949), Philippine Basketball Association player, member of the PBA Hall of Fame
- Manny Parra (born 1982), American Major League Baseball pitcher
- Manny Pérez (born 1969), Dominican-American actor
- Manny Piña (born 1987), Venezuelan baseball player
- Manny Ramirez (born 1972), Dominican-American retired Major League Baseball player
- Manny Ramirez (American football) (born 1983), American National Football League player
- Manny Sanguillén (born 1944), Panamanian Major League Baseball player
- Manny Suárez (born 1993), Chilean-Spanish basketball player
- Manny Trillo (born 1950), Venezuelan Major League Baseball player
- Muriel Tuteur (1922–2016), American labor activist
- Manny Victorino (born 1959), Philippine Basketball Association player
- Manny Villar (born 1949), Filipino businessman and politician
- Manny Wilkins (born 1995), American football player

== Fictional characters ==
- Manny Alvarez, in The Last of Us: Part II
- Manny Armstrong, a Ben 10 character
- Manny Bianco, in the sitcom Black Books
- Manny Calavera, the main character of Lucasarts video game Grim Fandango
- Manny Delgado, in the ABC sitcom Modern Family
- Manny Escuela, from Grand Theft Auto IV
- Manny Garcia, the titular character of Handy Manny, a children's television series
- Manny Heffley, one of the main characters in the Diary of a Wimpy Kid book and film series
- Manuel "Manny" O'Kelly-Davis, in The Moon Is a Harsh Mistress, a science fiction novel by Robert Heinlein
- Manny Pardo, a police detective from Hotline Miami 2: Wrong Number
- Manny Quinlan, in the television series Harry O
- Manny Ribera, a character in Scarface (1983)
- Manny Rivera, the titular character of Nickelodeon's El Tigre: The Adventures of Manny Rivera
- Manny Santos, in the Canadian television drama Degrassi: The Next Generation
- Manny Spamboni, in the 2009 revival version of The Electric Company
- Manny (Ice Age), a woolly mammoth in the Ice Age film series
- Manny, a praying mantis in the 1998 animated film A Bug's Life
- Manny the Mailman, the English name of the main character Jaimito, el cartero from the animated television series El Chavo Animado

== Surnname ==
- Baron Manny, a title in the Peerage of England
- Walter Manny, 1st Baron Manny (died 1372), soldier of fortune and founder of the Charterhouse
- John Henry Manny (1825–1856), American inventor of the Manny Reaper

== TV and film ==
- Manny (TV series), a 2011 South Korean television series by tvN
- Manny (film), a 2014 documentary film about Filipino boxer Manny Pacquiao
- The Manny, a 2015 German film
- The Manny (TV series), a fictional TV series

== Other uses ==
- Manny, a male nanny

== See also ==
- Mannie, a given name
- Manuel (name)
- Emanuel (name)
- Emanuele
- Emmanuel
- Herman (name)
- Immanuel
- Manfred (disambiguation)
