= Emmanuelle (disambiguation) =

Emmanuelle is the lead character in a series of erotic films.

Emmanuelle may also refer to:

- Emmanuelle (name)
- Emmanuëlle, Canadian singer

== Erotica franchise ==
- Emmanuelle (novel), a 1971 erotic novel by Emmanuelle Arsan
  - Emmanuelle (1974 film), based on the novel
    - Sylvia Kristel (1952–2012), Dutch actress, star of the 1974 film
  - Emmanuelle (video game), a 1989 video game loosely based on the novel
  - Emmanuelle (2024 film), a 2024 French erotic drama film, based on the novel
  - Emmanuelle Arsan (1932–2005), Thai-French author of the 1971 novel
- Black Emmanuelle, 1975 Italian sexploitation film, and ongoing film series, based on the French film series
  - Laura Gemser, Indonesian-Dutch actress, star of the Black Emmanuelle film series

== See also ==
- Emanuel (disambiguation)
- Emmanuel (disambiguation)
- Immanuel (disambiguation)
- Manuel (disambiguation)
- Manuela (disambiguation)
