= Manolis =

Manolis (Greek: Μανώλης, Μανόλης) is a Greek masculine given name, which is sometimes a contraction of Emmanouil. It may refer to:

- Manolis Anagnostakis (1925–2005), Greek poet and critic
- Manolis Andronikos (1919–1992), Greek archaeologist
- Manolis Angelopoulos (1939–1989), Greek singer
- Manolis Chiotis (1920–1970), Greek composer, singer and musician
- Manolis Glezos (1922–2020), Greek politician and writer
- Manolis Kalomiris (1883–1962), Greek composer
- Manolis Kefalogiannis (born 1959), Greek politician
- Manolis Liapakis (born 1984), Greek footballer
- Manolis Mavrommatis (born 1941), Greek politician
- Manolis Moniakis (born 1988), Greek footballer
- Manolis Papadopoulos (1968–2025), Greek football player and manager
- Manolis Papamakarios (born 1980), Greek basketball player
- Manolis Pappas (born 1951), Greek footballer
- Manolis Pratikakis (born 1943), Greek poet
- Manolis Psomas (born 1978), footballer
- Manolis Rasoulis (1945–2011), Greek composer, singer, writer and journalist
- Manolis Roubakis (born 1979), Greek footballer
- Manolis Skoufalis (born 1978), Greek footballer
- Manolis Triantafyllidis (1883–1959), Greek educationalist
- Manolis Xexakis (born 1948), Greek poet and writer

== See also ==
- Manilius (disambiguation)
- Manoleasa
- Manolich
- Manualist (disambiguation)
- Miaoulis (disambiguation)
- Monolistra
