= Manuel =

Manuel may refer to:

== People ==
- Manuel (name), a given name and surname
- Manuel (Fawlty Towers), a fictional character from the sitcom Fawlty Towers
- Manuel I Komnenos, emperor of the Byzantine Empire
- Manuel I of Portugal, king of Portugal
- Manuel I of Trebizond, Emperor of Trebizond

== Places ==
- Manuel, Valencia, a municipality in the province of Valencia, Spain
- Manuel Junction, railway station near Falkirk, Scotland

== Other ==
- Manuel (American horse), a thoroughbred racehorse
- Manuel (Australian horse), a thoroughbred racehorse
- Manuel and The Music of The Mountains, a musical ensemble
- Manuel (album), a 1974 album by Dalida
- Manuel (film), a 2017 drama film
- List of storms named Manuel
  - Hurricane Manuel (2013)

== See also ==
- Manny (disambiguation), a common nickname for those named Manuel
- Manoel (disambiguation)
- Immanuel (disambiguation)
- Emmanuel (disambiguation)
- Emanuel (disambiguation)
- Emmanuelle (disambiguation)
- Manuela (disambiguation)
