= Zymvrakakis =

Zymvrakakis is a surname. Notable people with the surname include:

- Epameinondas Zymvrakakis
- Emmanouil Zymvrakakis (disambiguation)
