= Emanoil =

Emanoil is a Romanian-language masculine given name, and may refer to:

- Emanoil Bacaloglu (1830–1891), Wallachian and Romanian mathematician, physicist, chemist, scubadiver, etc.
- Emanoil Badoi (born 1975), Romanian football full back
- Emanoil Bârzotescu (1888–1968), Romanian Major-General during World War II
- Emanoil Bucuța (1887–1946), Romanian prose writer and poet
- Emanoil Catelli (1883–1943), Moldovan politician
- Emanoil Costache Epureanu (1823–1880), twice the Prime Minister of Romania
- Ioan Emanoil Florescu (1819–1893), Romanian army general, Prime Minister of Romania for a short time in 1876 and 1891
- Emanoil Gojdu (1802–1870), Romanian lawyer in the Austrian Empire
- Emanoil Hașoti (born 1932), Romanian football forward
- Emanoil Ionescu (1887–1949), Romanian General during World War II and commander of the Romanian Air Force's Corpul I Aerian
- Emanoil Porumbaru (1845–1921), Romanian politician, Minister of Foreign Affairs of Romania 1914–1916
- Emanoil Răducanu (1929–1991), Romanian basketball player who competed in the 1952 Summer Olympics
- Emanoil Savin (1958–2024), Romanian businessman and politician
- Emanoil C. Teodorescu (1866–1949), Romanian botanist

== See also ==
- Emanuel (disambiguation)
- Emmanouil
