= Manuele =

Manuele is both a given name and a surname. Notable people with the name include:

- Manuele Blasi (born 1980), Italian footballer
- Manuele Mori (born 1980), Italian professional road bicycle racer
- Elena Manuele (born 2003), Italian singer

== See also ==
- Manual (disambiguation)
- Manuel (disambiguation)
- Manuelle
