= Manuel (name) =

- Gender: Male
- Language: Hebrew

Origin
- Meaning: God with us
- Region of origin: Western Europe

Other names
- Related names: Immanuel; Manu

Manuel is a masculine given name originating in the Hebrew name Immanuel (עִמָּנוּאֵל), which means "God with us." It was reportedly brought from the Byzantine Empire (as Μανουήλ) to Western Europe, mainly Germany, Portugal and Spain, where it has been used since at least the 13th century. The name is popular in Spanish, Portuguese, German, French, Romanian, Greek (Latinised as Manolis), Polish, and Dutch.

Manny, Manolo, Manel, Mael or Manu are often used as nicknames. Its feminine variant is Manuela.

== Middle Ages ==
- Manuel I Komnenos (1118–1180)
- Manuel II Palaiologos (1350–1425)
- Manuel I of Trebizond (1218–1263)
- Manuel II of Trebizond (1324–1333)
- Manuel III of Trebizond (1364–1417)
- Manuel I of Portugal (1469–1521)
- Infante Manuel, Count of Ourém, Portuguese prince, son of Peter II of Portugal
- Manuel of Castile (1234–1283), son of Ferdinand III of Castile
- Manuel I, patriarch of Constantinople in 1216–22
- Manuel II, patriarch of Constantinople in 1244–55
- Manuel Christonymos, birth name of Patriarch Maximus III of Constantinople, reigned 1476–1482

== Early modern ==
- Manuel da Nóbrega (1517–1570), Portuguese Jesuit and missionary in the early Colonial Brazil
- Manuel, Prince of Portugal (1531–1537), son of John III of Portugal
- Manuel Maria Barbosa du Bocage (1765–1805), Portuguese poet
- Manuel Cardoso (composer) (1566–1650), Portuguese composer
- Manuel Belgrano (1770–1820), Argentine politician and military leader during the Argentine War of Independence
- Manuel Pardo (politician) (1834–1878), Peruvian politician
- Manuel Pinto da Fonseca (1681–1773), Portuguese nobleman and Grand Master of the Order of Malta

== Modern given name ==
- Patriarchs of Lisbon
  - Manuel II, 14th cardinal-patriarch of Lisbon (1929–71)
  - Manuel III, 17th cardinal-patriarch of Lisbon (2013–23)
- Manuel II of Portugal (1889–1932), the last King of Portugal (1908–1910)
- Manuel Agogo (born 1979), Ghanaian football player
- Manuel Aguiar (1930–2009), Goan singer and tiatrist.
- Manuel Alegre (born 1936), Portuguese poet and politician
- Manny Aparicio (born 1995), Canadian football player
- Manuel Alfonso Andrade Oropeza (born 1989), Mexican professional wrestler known as "Andrade"
- Manuel Antonio de Varona (1908–1992), Cuban lawyer and politician
- Manuel Artime (1932–1977), Cuban anti-Fidel Castro guerilla
- Manuel de Blas (born 1941), Spanish actor
- Manuel Bandeira (1886–1968), Brazilian writer
- Manuel Bihr (born 1993), Thai footballer
- Manuel Caballero (1931–2010), Venezuelan historian
- Manuel Campos (canoeist) (born 1985), Spanish marathon canoeist
- Manuel Cortés Quero (1906–1991), Spanish politician
- Manuel Cuevas (born 1933), Mexican fashion designer
- Manuel Dabreu, American electrical engineer
- Manuel Domínguez (1868–1935), vice president of Paraguay
- Manuel Dubrulle (born 1972), French badminton player
- Manuel Elizalde Sr. (died 1985), Filipino businessman, polo player and sports patron
- Manuel Elizalde Jr. (1936–1997), Filipino businessman
- Manuel de Falla (1876–1946) Spanish composer
- Manuel Ferrara (born 1975), French pornographic actor and director
- Manuel Fettner (born 1985), Austrian ski jumper
- Manuel Fontán (born 2001), Spanish canoeist
- Manuel Galilea Widmer (born 1928), Chilean politician
- Manuel Gava (born 1991), Italian-born German politician
- Manuel Teixeira Gomes (1860–1941), Portuguese politician and writer, 7th President of Portugal
- Manuel Göttsching (1952–2022), German musician, member of Ash Ra Tempel
- Manuel Hailfinger (born 1982), German politician
- Manuel Hassassian (born 1953), Armenian-Palestinian professor
- Manuel Jiménez Díaz (1929–1960), Spanish bullfighter
- Manuel Jiménez Moreno (1902–1967), Spanish bullfighter
- Manuel Lanzini (born 1993), Argentine footballer
- Manuel Lauck (born 1983), German racing driver
- Manuel Litzke (born 1999), Austrian politician
- Manuel Locatelli (born 1998), Italian footballer
- Manuel Loff (born 1965), Portuguese politician
- Manuel Machata (born 1984), German bobsledder and World Champion of 2011
- Manuel Magalhaes (1911–1996), Chilean politician
- Manuel Mamikonian (fl. 4th century), Armenian general and ruler
- Manuel Merino (born 1961), Peruvian politician and president of Peru in 2020
- Manuel Morales (basketball) (born 1987), Peruvian basketball player
- Manuel Moroun (1927–2020), American businessman
- Manuel Neuer (born 1986), German football goalkeeper
- Manuel Noriega (1934–2017), Panamanian dictator and criminal
- Manoel de Oliveira (1908–2015), Portuguese film director
- Manuel V. Pangilinan (born 1946), Filipino businessman
- Manuel "Manny" Pardo (1956–2012), American serial killer and former police officer
- Manuel Pardo (governor) (1774–??), Spanish soldier and governor
- Manuel Pellegrini (born 1953), Chilean football manager
- Manuel Petrosyan (born 1998), Armenian chess grandmaster
- Manuel Pinho (born 1954), Portuguese politician and economist
- Manuel Poppinger (born 1989), Austrian ski jumper
- Manuel L. Quezon (1878–1944), first President of the Commonwealth of the Philippines
- Manny Ramírez (born 1972), Dominican-American Major League Baseball player
- Manuel Rivera-Ortiz (born 1968), American photographer
- Manuel Rocha (born 1950), American diplomat
- Manuel Roxas (1892–1948), first President of the Third Philippine Republic
- Manuel "Mar" Roxas II (born 1957), Filipino politician, grandson of Manuel Roxas
- Manuel Sanhouse (born 1975), Venezuelan football goalkeeper
- Manuel Schadwald (1981–disappeared 1993), missing German boy
- Manuel Seco (1928–2021), Spanish lexicographer
- Manuel Sosa (judge) (born 1950), Belizean jurist
- Manuel Tenenbaum (1934–2016), Uruguayan educator, historian and philanthropist
- Manuel Ugarte (footballer) (born 2001), Uruguayan footballer
- Manuel Uribe (1965–2014), Mexican who was at one time considered to be the heaviest man in the world
- Manuel Montalba Vega
- Manuel & the Music of the Mountains, pseudonym of composer/arranger Geoff Love (1917–1991)

== Surname ==
- Byron "Piri Piri" Manuel (born c.1956), Zimbabwean footballer at Black Aces FC in Harare
- Charlie Manuel (born 1944), American baseball player, coach and manager
- EJ Manuel (born 1990), American football player
- Herman E. Manuel (1849–1918), American politician
- Jacques-Antoine Manuel (1775–1827), French politician
- Jerry Manuel (born 1953), American baseball manager
- John Manuel (writer), baseball writer and scout
- John G. Manuel, Canadian First World War flying ace
- Juan Manuel, Prince of Villena (1232–1328), Spanish noble and medieval writer, son of Infante Manuel of Castile
- Laurent Manuel (born 1986), American association football (soccer) player
- Louis Pierre Manuel (1751–1793), political figure of the French Revolution
- Niklaus Manuel (c.1484–1530), Swiss painter
- Peter Manuel (1927–1958), American-born Scottish serial killer
- Peter Manuel (umpire) (born 1950), Sri Lankan cricket umpire
- Richard Manuel (1943–1986), Canadian composer, singer and multi-instrumentalist with The Band
- Rob Manuel (born 1973), English developer/producer of humorous/miscellaneous web content
- Roby Manuel (1895–1975), Australian aviator
- Rod Manuel (born 1974), American football player
- Simone Manuel (born 1996), American swimmer
- Vic Manuel (born 1987), Filipino basketball player
- Xavier Manuel (born 1987), American football player

== Fictional characters ==
- Manuel (Fawlty Towers), waiter in the BBC TV sitcom
- Manny Calavera, protagonist of the adventure game Grim Fandango
- Manuel de la Rocha (Empath), a Marvel Comics character
- Manuel Tijuana Guadalajara Tampico "Go-Go" Gomez, a character from UPA's Dick Tracy cartoon
- Manny Heffley, a fictional character in the children's book series Diary of a Wimpy Kid.
- Manny Pardo, a hard-boiled detective in the game Hotline Miami 2: Wrong Number (based on serial killer Manny Pardo)
- Manuel Alberto Javier Alejandro "Manny" Delgado, a character from the ABC TV sitcom Modern Family

== See also ==
- Isaiah 7:14
- List of names referring to El
