= Manuell =

Manuell is a surname. Notable people with the surname include:

- Dolores Manuell Gómez Angulo (born 1948), Mexican politician
- Eric Manuell (born 1941), Australian politician

== See also ==
- Manuel (name)
- Manuelle
