= Emanuele =

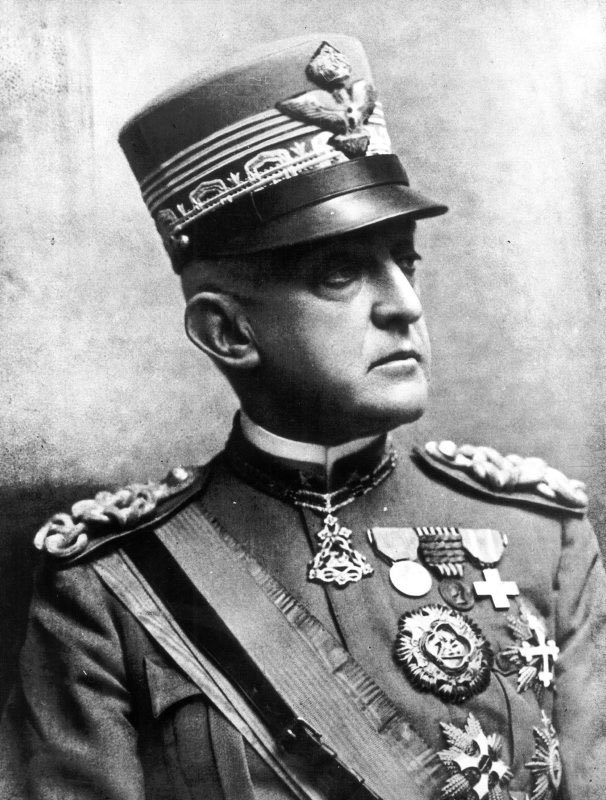
- Prince Emanuele Filiberto, Duke of Aosta
- Language: Italian

Other names
- Variant form: Emmanuele (non-recurring)
- Short form: Manuele
- Related names: Immanuel, Emmanuel

Emanuele is a masculine given name, the Italian form of the English name Emmanuel, which in turn derives from the Hebrew name Immanuel. Emmanuele is the primary form of the name in Italian but fell out of use due to the strong presence of the form Emanuele among Italian aristocratic elites. Emanuele is likely a calque of the German Emanuel, often associated with aristocracy in Europe.

The name Emanuele gained significant popularity in Italy through figures such as Carlo Emanuele the Great and the great king Vittorio Emanuele I. The name is also recurrent in religious contexts through figures like Carlo Emanuele Pio of Savoy.

Personalities with this name:

- Emanuele d'Astorga (1681–1736), Italian composer
- Emanuele Repetti (1776–1852), historian
- Emanuele Gianturco (1857–1907), Italian legal scholar and politician
- Emanuele Nutile (1862–1932), Italian writer and composer
- Emanuele Filiberto, 2nd Duke of Aosta (1869–1931), eldest son of Amadeo I of Spain
- Carlo Emanuele Buscaglia (1915–1944), Italian aviator
- Emanuele Luzzati (1921–2007), Italian painter, production designer, illustrator, film director and animator
- Emanuele Severino (1929–2020), Italian philosopher
- Emanuele Chiapasco (1930–2021), Italian baseball player and entrepreneur
- Emanuele Basile (1949–1980), captain of Carabinieri
- Emanuele Nicosia (1953–2016), automobile designer
- Emanuele Pirro (born 1962), Italian auto racing driver
- Emanuele Crialese (born 1965), Italian film screenwriter and director
- Emanuele Naspetti (born 1968), racing driver
- Emanuele Guidi (born 1969), Sammarinese archer
- Emanuele Idini (born 1970), freestyle swimmer
- Emanuele Canonica (born 1971), Italian golfer
- Emanuele Filiberto, Prince of Venice and Piedmont (born 1972), member of the House of Savoy
- Emanuele Merisi (born 1972), Italian swimmer
- Emanuele Filippini (born 1973), Italian football player
- Emanuele Pesaresi (born 1976), Italian football player
- Emanuele Belardi (born 1977), Italian football player
- Emanuele Manitta (born 1977), Italian football player
- Emanuele Pesoli (born 1980), Italian football player
- Emanuele Calaiò (born 1982), Italian football player
- Emanuele Nicolini (born 1984), Sammarinese swimmer
- Emanuele Gesualdi (born 2004), Italian entrepreneur

== Surname ==
- Vittorio Emanuele, Count of Turin (1872–1946), grandchild of King Victor Emmanuel II
- Vittorio Emanuele, Prince of Naples (born 1937), last Crown Prince of Italy
- Vittorio Emanuele Orlando (1860–1952), Italian diplomat and political figure

== See also ==
- Emanuel
- Immanuel
- Manuel (name)
- Manuele
- Manuelle
