= Ivan Hristov =

Ivan Hristov may refer to:

- Ivan Hristov (canoeist) (born 1982), Bulgarian canoeist
- Ivan Hristov (writer) (born 1978), Bulgarian poet and critic
