= Mulunga =

Mulunga is a surname. Notable people with the surname include:

- Immanuel Mulunga, Namibian businessman
- Lovisa Mulunga (born 1995), Namibian footballer
- Michael Mulunga (born 1989), Namibian politician

== See also ==
- Mulund
