= Emmanuel (disambiguation) =

Emmanuel is a romanization of the Hebrew name עמנואל Immanuel, meaning "God with us".

Emmanuel may also refer to:

- Emmanuel (name), a given name and surname

== Churches ==
- Emmanuel Association, a Methodist Christian denomination in the conservative holiness movement
- Emmanuel Community, a Catholic charismatic community

== Educational institutions ==
- Emmanuel City Technology College, Gateshead, England
- Emmanuel College, Boston, Massachusetts, US
- Emmanuel College, Cambridge, England

== Arts ==
- Emmanuel, a magazine published by the Congregation of the Blessed Sacrament in the United States
- Emmanuel (album), an album by Anuel AA
- Emmanuel (EP), an extended play by rapper Ameer Vann
- Emmanuel (singer) (born 1955), Mexican singer
- Emmanuel (artist), fantasy artist

== See also ==
- Emanuel (disambiguation)
- Emanu-El (disambiguation)
- Emmanuelle (disambiguation)
- Immanuel (disambiguation)
- Manuel (disambiguation)
