= Manucho (nickname) =

Manucho is an old Germanic first name.

As a nickname, Manucho may refer to:

== People with the nickname ==
- Manuel Mujica Láinez (1910–1984), Argentine fiction writer and art critic
- Manucho Gonçalves (born 1983), Angolan footballer
- Fabrice Elysée Kouadio Kouakou (born 1990), Ivorian footballer
- Manucho Barros (born 1986), Angolan International footballer, plays for Interclube in Girabola
- Manucho Diniz (born 1986), Angolan footballer who plays as a midfielder for Primeiro de Agosto

== See also ==
- Manuel (disambiguation)
