= Prince Emanuele =

Prince Emanuele may refer to:

- Prince Emanuele Filiberto, 2nd Duke of Aosta (1869–1931), eldest son of Amadeo I of Spain
- Prince Emanuele Filiberto of Venice and Piedmont (born 1972), member of the House of Savoy
- Prince Vittorio Emanuele of Naples (born 1937), last Crown Prince of Italy
- Prince Emmanuel, Duke of Vendôme
- Prince Emmanuel of Belgium (born 2005)

== See also ==
- Emanuele
- Prince (disambiguation)
