= Manuela =

Manuela may refer to:

== People ==
- Manuela (given name), a Spanish and Portuguese feminine given name
- Manuela (singer) (1943–2001), German singer of Schlager songs

== Film and television ==
- Manuela (1957 film), a British film directed by Guy Hamilton
- Manuela (1967 film), a Cuban short film directed by Humberto Solás
- Manuela (1976 film), a Spanish film directed by Gonzalo García Pelayo
- Manuela (2006 film), a film directed by Marco Castro
- Manuela (TV series), a 1991 telenovela starring Grecia Colmenares

== Music ==
- "Manuela" (Demis Roussos song), 1974
- "Manuela", a song by Julio Iglesias from A flor de piel, 1974

== See also ==
- Manuel (disambiguation)
- Emmanuelle (disambiguation)
