= Emmanouil =

Emmanouil (Greek: Εμμανουήλ) is the Greek version of the name Emanuel. It may refer to:

== People ==
- Emmanouil Antoniadis (1791–1863), revolutionary in the Greek War of Independence
- Emmanouil Argyropoulos (1889–1913), Greek aviator
- Emmanouil Benakis (1843–1929), Greek merchant and politician
- Emmanouil Dadaoglou (died 1870), Greek anarchist
- Emmanuel Kriaras (1906–2014), Greek lexicographer and philologist
- Emmanouil Lampakis (1859–1909), Greek painter
- Emmanouil Manousogiannakis (1853–1916), Greek Army officer during the Balkan Wars
- Emmanouil A. Miaoulis (fl. 1800s), Greek naval officer
- Emmanouil Mylonakis (born 1985), Greek water polo player
- Emmanouil Pappas (1772–1821), leader of the Greek War of Independence in Macedonia
- Emmanouil Peristerakis (fl. 1920), Greek sports shooter
- Emmanouil Rhoides (1836–1904), Greek writer and journalist
- Emmanouil Siopis (born 1994), Greek footballer
- Emmanouil Tombazis (1784–1831), Greek naval captain
- Emmanouil Tsouderos (1882–1956), Greek political and financial figure
- Emmanuil Xanthos (1772–1852), one of the founders of the Filiki Eteria
- Emmanouil Zymvrakakis (army general) (1861–1928), Greek army officer during World War I
- Emmanouil Zymvrakakis (Gendarmerie general) (1856–1931), Cretan officer
- Helen Fessas-Emmanouil (born 1943), Greek architect

== Places ==
- Emmanouil Pappas (municipality), a municipality in Central Macedonia, Greece
- Emmanouil Pappas (village), a village in Central Macedonia, Greece

== See also ==
- Manolis, sometimes a contraction of this name
