= Emmanuelli =

Emmanuelli is a French surname. Notable people with the surname include:

- Henri Emmanuelli (1945–2017), French politician
- Laurent Emmanuelli (born 1976), French rugby union player
- Miguel Emmanuelli, Puerto Rican sports shooter

== See also ==
- Emmanuelle (name)
