= Imanol =

Imanol is a given name and the Basque language equivalent of Immanuel. It is the first name of several notable people:

- Imanol Agirretxe (born 1987), Spanish football forward
- Imanol Alguacil (born 1971), Spanish footballer and manager
- Imanol Arias (born 1956), Spanish actor
- Imanol Arriortua (born 1998), Spanish para cyclist
- Imanol Corral (born 1994), Spanish footballer
- Imanol de la Sota (born 1975), Spanish football manager
- Imanol Elías (born 1990), Spanish footballer
- Imanol Erviti (born 1983), Spanish road cyclist
- Imanol Estévez (born 1993), Spanish cyclist
- Imanol Ezkurdia (born 1999), Spanish footballer
- Imanol Etxeberria (born 1973), Spanish goalkeeper
- Imanol García (born 1995), Spanish footballer
- Imanol García de Albéniz (born 2000), Spanish football defender
- Imanol Garciandia (born 1995), Spanish handballer
- Imanol González (born 1998), Argentine footballer
- Imanol Harinordoquy (born 1980), French international rugby union player
- Imanol Idiakez (born 1972), Spanish footballer and manager
- Imanol Iriberri (born 1987), Argentine footballer
- Imanol Landeta (born 1987; formerly Imanol), Mexican actor and singer
- Imanol Larzabal (1947–2004), Spanish singer and composer from the Basque country
- Imanol Machuca (born 2000), Argentine footballer
- Imanol Murga (born 1958), Spanish cyclist
- Imanol Ortiz (1960–2011), Spanish musician and producer in Cuba
- Imanol Pradales (born 1975), Lehendakari of the Basque Government since 2024
- Imanol Rojo (born 1990), Spanish cross country skier
- Imanol Sarriegi (born 1995), Spanish footballer
- Imanol Uribe (born 1950), Basque screenwriter and filmmaker
