= Manuela (given name) =

- Gender: Female

Origin
- Language: Hebrew
- Meaning: "God is with us"

Other names
- Variant form: Manuéla
- Related names: Manuel, Emanuel

Manuela or Manuéla is a feminine Portuguese, Spanish and Italian given name. The name is a variant of the masculine "Manuel", which is in turn derived from the Hebrew name "Emanuel", meaning "God is with us".

== List of people with the given name Manuela or Manuéla ==
- Manuela Arbelaez, model and actress appearing in The Price is Right models (formerly Barker's Beauties)
- Manuela Azevedo, Portuguese singer
- Manuela Berchtold, Australian freestyle skier
- Manuela Bojadžijev (born 1971), German academic
- Manuela Campanelli, Italian science journalist
- Manuela Dalla Valle, Italian swimmer
- Manuela d'Ávila, Brazilian politician
- Manuela Derr, German sprinter
- Manuela Di Centa, Italian cross-country skier
- Manuela Ernst (born 1985), Swiss politician
- Manuela Groß, German figure skater
- Manuela Ímaz, Mexican actress
- Manuéla Kéclard-Mondésir (born 1971), French politician
- Manuela Kelley (born 1976), German freehand tattoo artist
- Manuela Kormann, Swiss curler
- Manuela Kraller, German singer
- Manuela Leggeri, Italian volleyball player
- Manuela Machado, Portuguese long-distance runner
- Manuela Maffioli, Italian politician
- Manuela Maleeva, Bulgarian / Swiss tennis player
- Manuela Antonia Márquez García-Saavedra (1844–1890), Peruvian writer, poet, composer pianist
- Manuela Martelli, Chilean film and television actress
- Manuela Mölgg, Italian alpine skier
- Manuela Mucke, German sprint canoer
- Manuela Perteghella, British politician
- Manuela Priemer, German hammer thrower
- Manuela Sáenz, Ecuadorian national heroine
- Manuela Sancho, Aragonese revolutionary
- Manuela Schmermund (born 1971), German Paralympic sport shooter
- Manuela Schmidt (born 1963), German politician
- Manuela Schwesig, German politician
- Manuela Spinelli, translator associated with Italian association football coach Giovanni Trapattoni
- Manuela Stellmach, German freestyle swimmer
- Manuela Velasco, Spanish film actress
- Manuela Bosco, Finnish actress
- Manuela Weichelt-Picard (born 1967), Swiss politician

=== Fictional characters ===
- Manuela Santos, a fictional character in Degrassi: The Next Generation
- Manuela Casagranda, a famous songstress and physician in Fire Emblem: Three Houses
- Manuela, a character from the James Bond film Moonraker
- Manuela Hidalgo, a character in Resident Evil.
- Manuela "Pipa" Pelari, a character from 2018 Argentine film Perdida, from 2020 film Intuition and from 2022 film Pipa
- Manuela Dominguez, a character in The Magnus Archives
