= William Bernoudy =

American architect (1910–1988)

- Born: 1910; St. Louis, Missouri
- Died: 1988 (aged 77–78)
- Education: Washington University in St. Louis

William Adair Bernoudy (1910–1988) was an American architect.

Bernoudy was born in St. Louis where he attended the Washington University in St. Louis School of Architecture (now Sam Fox School of Design & Visual Arts). He studied under Frank Lloyd Wright in the 1930s. He is noted for the many modernist homes and public buildings he designed, mostly in the St. Louis area. The heyday of his work was in the 1950s.

The William A. Bernoudy Residency in Architecture at the American Academy in Rome is named in his honor.

In fall of 2019, the Sam Fox School of Design & Visual Arts of Washington University in St. Louis dedicated its new William A. Bernoudy Architecture Studio following a $1.5 million gift from the Gertrude & William A. Bernoudy Foundation. Located within Anabeth and John Weil Hall, under construction as part of the university’s east end transformation project, the 6,580-square-foot studio will provide facilities for the school’s Graduate School of Architecture & Urban Design.

He died in 1988.

== Buildings (selected) ==
- 12166 Conway Road (Temple Emanuel (St. Louis, Missouri)) 63141 (1962)
- 23 Villa Coublay Drive, Frontenac, MO 63131
- 457 Osage Ridge Road, Augusta, MO 63332
- 25 Balcon Estates, Creve Coeur, MO 63141 (1964)
- 6937 West Otsego Lake Drive, Gaylord, MI 49730-1958
- 446 North Warson Road, St. Louis, MO 63124
- Saint Louis Zoo North Entrance, MO 63112
- Beaumont Pavilion in Washington University in St. Louis, MO 63105
- Thomas Jefferson School's Gymnasium, St. Louis, MO 63127
