= Manel =

Manel may refer to:

== People ==
- Manel (footballer, born 1971), Spanish football midfielder
- Manel (footballer, born 1972), Spanish football midfielder
- Manel (footballer, born 1973), Spanish football forward
- Manel Abeysekera, Sri Lankan diplomat
- Manel Bosch (born 1967), Spanish basketball player
- Manel Cruz, member of Ornatos Violeta
- Manel Esclusa (born 1952), Catalan photographer
- Manel Esteller (born 1968), Spanish geneticist
- Manel Expósito (born 1981), Spanish football player
- Manel Fontdevila
- Manel Guillen (born 1967), Spanish businessman, lawyer and activist investor
- Manel Kape (born 1993), Angolian mixed martial artist
- Manel Kouki (born 1988), Tunisian handball player
- Manel Loureiro, Spanish author
- Manel Martínez (born 1992), Spanish football player
- Manel Muñoz, Spanish cyborg artist
- Manel Navarro (born 1996), Spanish singer and songwriter
- Manel Pelegrina Lopez (born 1968), Andorran ski mountaineer
- Manel Ruano (born 1974), Spanish football player
- Manel Terraza (born 1990), Spanish field hockey player
- Manel Wanaguru (born 1951), Sri Lankan actress
- Manel de la Rosa (Barcelona, 1961), Spanish writer
- Manel del Valle
- Manél Minicucci (born 1995), Italian football player
- Zé Manel (footballer), Portuguese football player

== Other ==
- Manel (band), Spanish (Catalan) indie pop band
- Manel Rochaid, Wheel of Time character
- manel, an all-male panel
