= Henrik Bródy =

Hungarian (after 1918 Czechoslovak) rabbi

Rabbi Heinrich Brody
- חיים בראדי
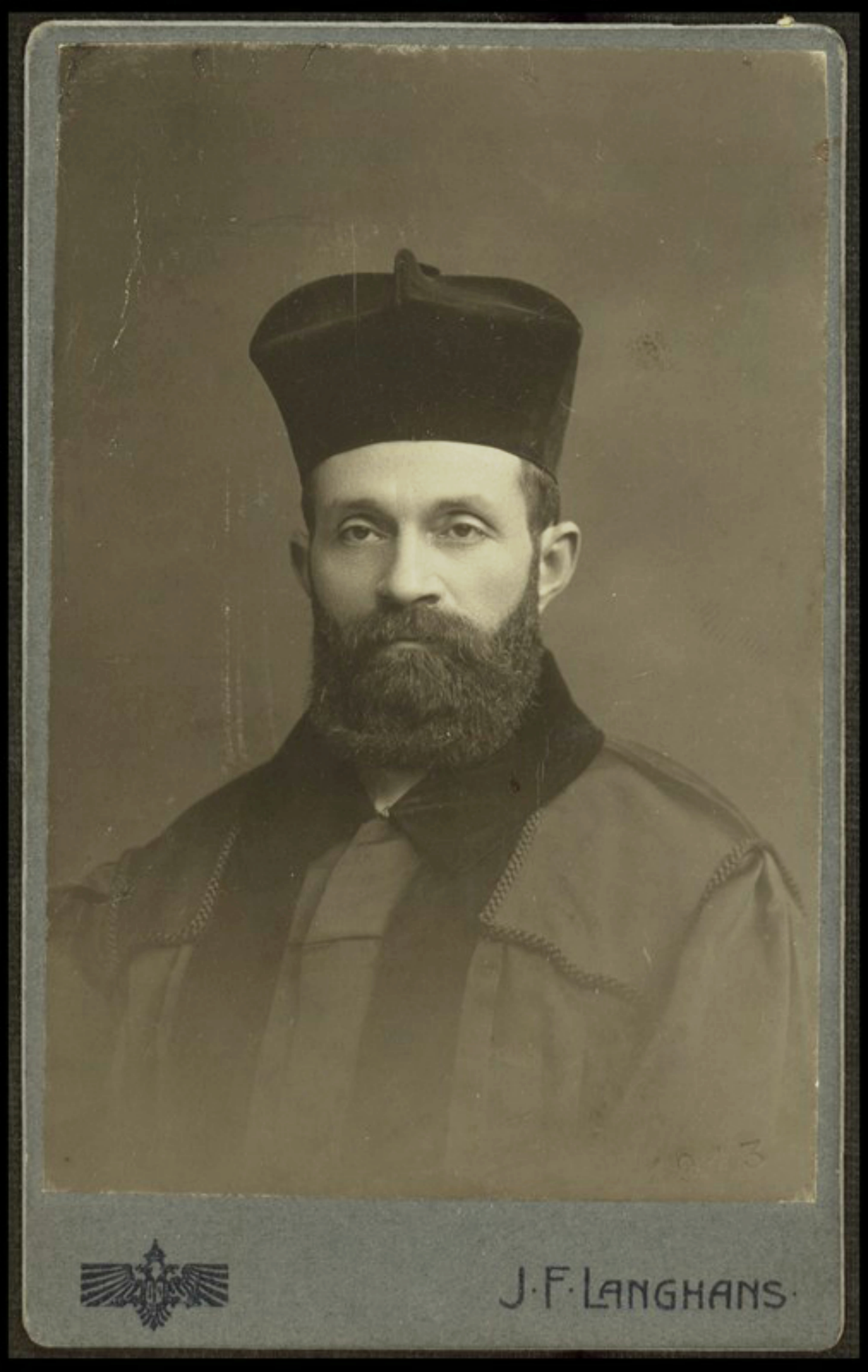
- Henrik Bródy, Prague 1913

Chief Rabbi of Prague

Rabbi of Náchod

Personal life
- Born: May 21, 1868 Ungvár, Ung County, Kingdom of Hungary
- Died: 1942 Mandatory Palestine
- Known for: Leading the Mizrachi movement in Czechoslovakia
- Other names: Bródy Henrik, Haim Brody
- Occupation: Rabbi

Religious life
- Religion: Judaism
- Denomination: Orthodox

Heinrich Brody (German), Bródy Henrik (Hungarian) or Haim Brody (Hebrew: חיים בראדי; 21 May 1868 – 1942) was a Hungarian (after 1918 Czechoslovak) rabbi. He was born in Ungvár, in the Ung County of the Kingdom of Hungary (present-day Ukraine).

He was a descendant of Abraham Broda. Educated in the public schools of his native town and at the rabbinical colleges of Tolcsva and Pressburg, Hungary, Brody also studied at the Hildesheimer Theological Seminary and at the University of Berlin, being an enthusiastic scholar of the Hebrew language and literature.

He was for some time secretary of the literary society Mekiẓe Nirdamim, and in 1896 founded the "Zeitschrift für Hebräische Bibliographie", of which he was coeditor with A. Freiman.

Brody was the rabbi of the congregation of Náchod, Bohemia and chief rabbi of Prague (both cities then part of Austria-Hungary), before moving to Palestine. In Czechoslovakia, he was the leader of the Mizrachi movement.

== Literary works ==
Brody is author or editor of the following works:

- "Hebräische Prosodie von Imm. Frances, mit Einleitung und Anmerkungen", Cracow, 1892;
- "Haschlamah zum Talm. Tractat Berachot, von R. Meschullam b. Mose", Berlin, 1893;
- "Beiträge zu Salomo da-Piera's Leben und Wirken", Berlin, 1893;
- "David Cassel's Biographie", Cracow, 1893;
- "Ein Dialog von Imm. Frances", Cracow, 1893;
- "Offener Brief an Herrn Prof. M. Hartmann", Berlin, 1894;
- "Literarhistor. Mitteilungen", No. 1, Cracow, 1894;
- "Studien zu den Dichtungen Yehuda ha-Levi's", i.: "Ueber die Metra der Versgedichte", Berlin, 1895;
- "Zehn Gedichte aus dem Dîwân Moses ibn Esra", Leipzig, 1896;
- "Der Dîwân des Yehuda ha-Levi", vols. i. and ii.1, 1894–1901;
- "Weltliche Gedichte des Abu' Ajjub Soleiman b. Yahja (Solomon) ibn Gabirol", No. 1-2, Berlin, 1897–1898;
- "Arnold B. Ehrlichs, Mikra ki-Peschuto Kritisch Beleuchtet", Cracow, 1902;
- "Mikra Kodesch", 1902.

He has also published, under the assumed name of Dr. H. Salomonsohn, "Widerspricht der Zionismus Unserer Religion?" 1898, and is a contributor to "Ha-Maggid," "Israelitische Monatsschrift," "Magazin für die Wissenschaft des Judenthums," "Monatsschrift für Geschichte und Literatur des Judenthums," "Allgemeine Zeitung des Judenthums," "Évkönyv," "Ha-Eshkol," "Ha-Shiloaḥ," etc.
