= Immanuel (disambiguation) =

Immanuel is a biblical character and Hebrew name.

Immanuel may also refer to:

- Immanuel (name), a given name
- Immanuel (Israeli settlement), in the West Bank
- Immanuel (film), a 2013 Malayalam drama
- Immanu El, a Swedish post-rock band

== See also ==
- Emanuel (disambiguation)
- Emanu-El (disambiguation)
- Emmanuel (disambiguation)
- Manuel (disambiguation)
