= Emmanouil Zymvrakakis =

Emmanouil Zymvrakakis (Greek: Εμμανουήλ Ζυμβρακάκης) may refer to:

- Emmanouil Zymvrakakis (Cretan revolutionary) (died 1821)
- Emmanouil Zymvrakakis (Gendarmerie general) (1856–1931), nephew of the above
- Emmanouil Zymvrakakis (army general) (1861–1928), grandson of E. Zymvrakakis (died 1821)
