= Emanuel (name) =

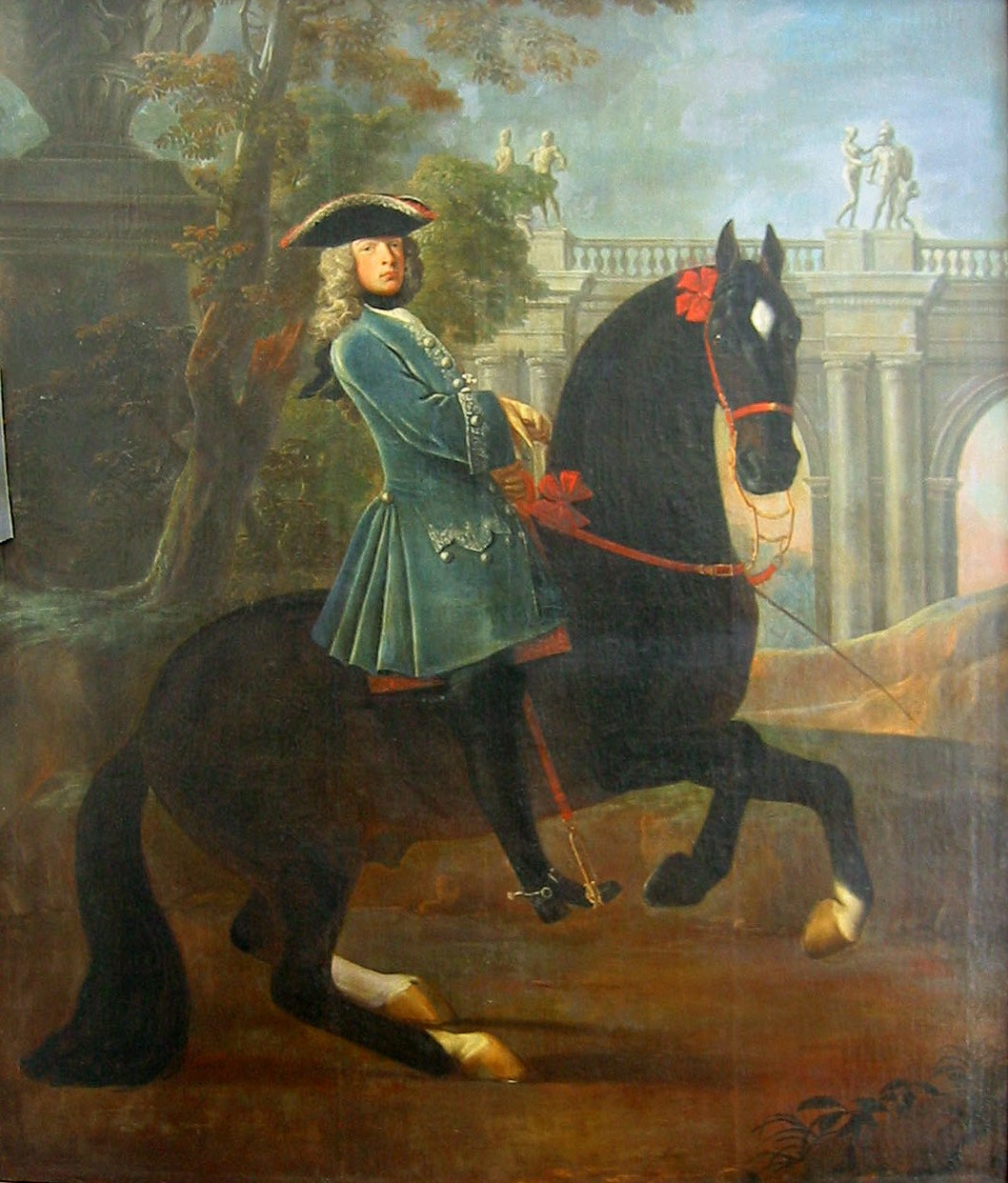
- Emanuel of Liechtenstein
- Language: Portuguese, Spanish, German, Dutch, Scandinavian, Czech, Hungarian, Croatian

Other names
- Related names: Emmanuel, Immanuel
- See also: Emanuele, Emanuil, Emanoil, Emanuël

Emanuel (from Hebrew, meaning "God with us") is a masculine given name, the Portuguese, Romanian, Spanish, Czech, Dutch, German, Hungarian, Croatian, Scandinavian form of the English name Emmanuel. The name Emanuel is quite popular in Brazil and has become more common than its primary form, Manuel (Manoel in archaic Portuguese). In German-speaking countries, Emanuel is a well-established name in Austria, Germany, Switzerland, and Liechtenstein.

The name Emanuel is regarded as a symbolic and religious name strongly associated with Judaism and Christianity. The Italian name Emanuele (with a single "m") is influenced by German culture and coexists with the unpopular form Emmanuele. The Old French name Émael is also occasionally used as an apocopated form of the name Emanuel. In the Hungarian language, the name Emanuel is written as Emánuel (with an accent on the "á"). The name Emanuel also has three variants in Romanian: Emanuel, Emanuil, and Emanoil.

== People with this given name ==
- Maximilian II Emanuel (1662–1726), Elector of Bavaria
- Billy Cobham, né William Emanuel Cobham Jr. (born 1944), American jazz drummer
- Emanuel Bronner (1908–1997), soap maker
- Emanuel Cvjetićanin (1833–1919), general
- Emanuel E. Downham (1839–1921), American politician, businessman, miner
- Emanuel Eckardt (born 1942), German journalist and caricaturist
- Emanuel R. Gold (1935–2013), New York politician
- Emanuel Grossman (1913–1954), Soviet pianist
- Emanuel Hall (born 1997), American football player
- Emanuel "E.J." Jenkins (born 1998), American football player
- Emanuel Lasker (1868–1941), German chess player, mathematician and philosopher
- Emanuel Libman (1872–1946), American physician
- Emanuel Newton (born 1984), American mixed martial artist
- Emanuel Öz (born 1979), Swedish politician
- Emanuel Pogatetz (born 1983), Austrian football defender
- Emanuel Rackman (1910–2008), American Modern Orthodox rabbi; President of Bar-Ilan University
- Emanuel Rego (born 1973), beach volley player, Olympic gold medalist
- Emanuel Rodriguez (born 1986), Mexican-American professional wrestler
- Emanuel Schafer (1900–1974), German SS officer
- Emanuel Schädler (born 1983), Liechtenstein government councillor
- Emanuel Sharp (born 2004), Israeli-American basketball player
- Emanuel Swedenborg (1688–1772), Swedish scientist, philosopher, and theologian
- Emanuel Wilson (American football) (born 1998), American football player

== People with this surname ==
- Ari Emanuel (born 1961), American talent agent, brother of Ezekiel and Rahm
- David Emanuel (politician) (1744–1808), 24th Governor of Georgia, USA
- Ezekiel Emanuel (born 1957), American bioethicist, brother of Ari and Rahm
- James Emanuel (1921–2013), American poet and scholar
- Kent Emanuel (born 1992), American baseball player
- Kerry Emanuel, born 1955, American climate scientist
- Lee Emanuel (born 1985), British middle-distance runner
- Oliver Emanuel (1980–2023), British playwright and radio dramatist
- Rahm Emanuel (born 1959), American politician and diplomat, brother of Ari and Ezekiel
- Tom Emanuel (1915–1997), Welsh footballer

== See also ==
- Emmanuel (name)
