= Emmanuel (name) =

Name

Emmanuel is a name and surname, which is a romanization of Immanuel. Notable prople with the name include:

== Royalty ==
- Charles Emmanuel I of Savoy (1562–1630)
- Charles Emmanuel II of Savoy (1634–1675)
- Charles Emmanuel III of Savoy (1701–1773)
- Charles Emmanuel IV of Savoy (1751–1819)
- Emmanuel Macron, as Emmanuel I, co-prince of Andorra (born 1977, reigned since 2017)
- Victor Emmanuel I of Savoy (1759–1824)
- Victor Emmanuel II of Italy (1820–1878)
- Victor Emmanuel III of Italy (1869–1947)
- Victor Emmanuel, Prince of Naples (1937-2024)

== Given name ==
- Emmanuel (singer) (born 1955), Mexican singer
- Emmanuel Adebayor (born 1984), Togolese football striker
- Emmanuel Banahene (born 1988), Ghanaian footballer
- Emmanuel Bett (born 1985), Kenyan long-distance runner
- Emmanuel Boileau de Castelnau (1857–1923), French mountain climber
- Emmanuel Callender (born 1984), Trinidadian sprint athlete
- Emmanuel Collard (born 1971), French racing driver
- Emmanuel Ellerbee (born 1996), American football player
- Emmanuel Farhi (1978–2020), French economist
- Emmanuel Forbes (born 2001), American football player
- Emmanuel Goldstein, pen name of Eric Corley (born 1959), American member of the hacking community
- Emmanuel de Grouchy, marquis de Grouchy (1766–1847), Marshal of France
- Emmanuel Henderson (born 2003), American football player
- Emmanuel Ija, South Sudanese physician and politician
- Emmanuel Jalai (born 1999), Zimbabwean footballer
- Emmanuel Kiprono Kipsang (born 1991), Kenyan long-distance track runner
- Emmanuel Kwasi Kotoka (1926–1967), Ghanaian Army officer, member of the ruling National Liberation Council
- Emmanuel Kriaras (1906–2014), Greek lexicographer and philologist
- Emmanuel Lacresse (born 1971), French politician
- Emmanuel Lescure (died 2017), French businessman
- Emmanuel Levinas, French-Lithuanian philosopher and Talmudic commentator
- Emmanuel Lewis (born 1971), American actor
- Emmanuel Christopher Loblack (1898–1995), Dominican trade unionist and politician
- Emmanuel Maquet (born 1968), French MP
- Emmanuel Mbende (born 1996), Cameroonian footballer
- Emmanuel McNeil-Warren (born 2004), American football player
- Emmanuel de Merode (born 1970), director of the Virunga National Park in the Democratic Republic of the Congo
- Emmanuel Moseley (born 1996), American football player
- Emmanuel J. Nuquay, Liberian politician
- Emmanuel Noi Omaboe (1930–2005), Ghanaian economist and public servant
- Emmanuel Otteh (1927–2012), Nigerian Roman Catholic bishop
- Emmanuel Oyebadejo (born 2004), English gridiron football player
- Emmanuel "Manny" Pacquiao (born 1978), Filipino world champion professional boxer
- Emmanuel "Eman" Bacosa Pacquiao (born 2004), Filipino professional boxer
- Emmanuel Patut (born 2003), Finnish footballer
- Emmanuel Pregnon (born 2001), American football player
- Emmanuel Ramírez (born 1994), Dominican baseball player
- Emmanuel Ray (born 1980), Sri Lankan presenter and human rights activist
- Emmanuel Rhoides (1836–1904), Greek writer and journalist
- Emmanuel Sanders (born 1987), American football player
- Emmanuel Danilo Clementino Silva, naturalized Equatoguinean football goalkeeper
- Emmanuel Tarpin (born 1992), French contemporary jewelry designer
- Emmanuel Yáñez (born 1985), Uruguayan road cyclist
- Emmanuel Wanyonyi (born 2004), Kenyan middle-distance runner

== Surname ==
- Esmé Emmanuel (born 1947), South African tennis player
- Ivor Emmanuel (1927—2007), Welsh singer and actor
- Marthe Emmanuel (1901–1997), French geographer
- Maurice Emmanuel (1862–1938), French composer, teacher and musicologist
- Nathalie Emmanuel (born 1989), English actress
- Pauline Emmanuel Rosenthal (1845-1912), German composer
- Soula Emmanuel (born 1990 or 1991), Irish writer
- Tommy Emmanuel (born 1955), Australian guitar player

== Fictional characters ==
- Emmanuel Goldstein (disambiguation), multiple characters

== See also ==
- Emanuel (name)
