= Olga Gauks =

German politician

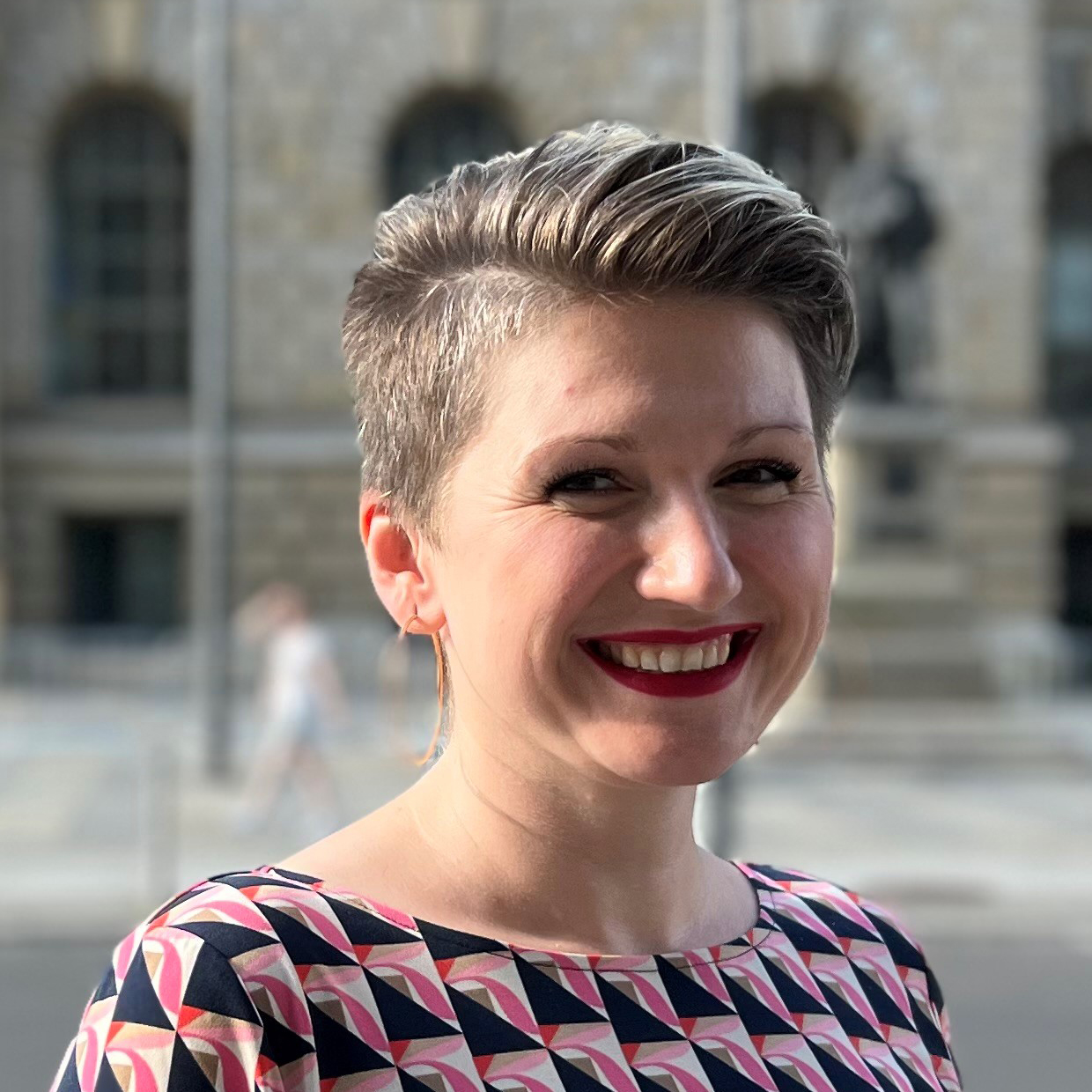
- Olga Gauks in 2023

Member of the Abgeordnetenhaus of Berlin
- Incumbent
- Assumed office 2023
- Preceded by: Manuela Schmidt
- Constituency: Marzahn-Hellersdorf 2

Personal details
- Born: 1987 (age 38–39) Alma-Ata, Kazakhstan (then Soviet Union)
- Party: Christian Democratic Union

Olga Gauks (born 1987 in Alma-Ata) is a German politician from the Christian Democratic Union of Germany (CDU). She has been a member of the Abgeordnetenhaus of Berlin since 2023.

== Life ==
Gauks was born in Alma-Ata, the then capital of the Kazakh Soviet Socialist Republic (now Almaty, Kazakhstan), and grew up in the Harz Mountains from the age of twelve. She is a German teacher by profession. She is a German repatriate, married, has three children, and lives in Berlin in the Marzahn-Hellersdorf district.

She holds a Bachelor's degree in Philology for teaching German from the Kazakh University of International Relations and World Languages "Ablay Khan" in 2009. She also holds a Bachelor's degree in Law from the Almaty Management University in 2016.

== Politics ==
Gauks is a member of the CDU. She ran for the Berlin House of Representatives in the 2021 Berlin state election in the Marzahn-Hellersdorf 2 constituency, but failed to secure a seat. In the 2023 Berlin state election, she won the direct mandate in the Marzahn-Hellersdorf 2 constituency, defeating the incumbent Die Linke member Manuela Schmidt. She is the first Russian-German to serve in the Berlin state parliament.

Since 25 April 2023, Gauks has operated a joint Wahlkreisbüro in Marzahn-Mitte with Bundestag member Mario Czaja.

== See also ==
- List of members of the 19th Abgeordnetenhaus of Berlin (2023–2026)
