= Emanuil A. Vidinski =

Bulgarian writer, poet, and musician (born 1978)

Emanuil A. Vidinski (Bulgarian: Емануил А. Видински; born June 1978 in Vidin, Bulgaria) is a Bulgarian writer, poet, and musician.

== Career ==
Vidinski has published his works in several Bulgarian newspapers (Culture, Literary Newspaper, Capital Light), magazines, and literature web portals (LiterNet, Slovoto, GrosniPelikani). He co-founded the humanistic seminar "Angel" (2003–2004), which focused on the work of Tchavdar Mutafov, Thomas Mann and Feodor Dostoyevsky

His debut, the short story collection Cartographies of Escape (2005), was shortlisted for the Elias Canetti Award. That same period, he won the Rashko Sugarev Award (2004) for the short story "4th of October,"

During 2005–2006 he wrote a music column entitled "Musaic" for the Literary Newspaper. In 2004, he and poets Petar Tchouhov and Ivan Hristov established the ethno-rock poetry band Gologan.

Vidinski was the founder and editor of the book series "World Novels" at Altera publishing from 2007 to 2010. He then worked as an editor for the Bulgarian section of Deutsche Welle, and then as editor-in-chief of Panorama Magazine.

His novel Home for Beginners (Janet 45, 2023) received the First Prize for Prose at the 2024 Annual Awards for Literature and Humanities of Portal Kultura, one of Bulgaria's leading cultural platforms. His work has been translated into English, German, Hungarian, Armenian, Croatian, and Spanish.

Since 2019, Vidinski has been an editor at Literaturen Vestnik (Literary Newspaper), one of the most respected print publications dedicated to literature in Bulgaria.

== Bibliography ==
- Cartographies of Escape (2005) – selection of short stories, published by Stigmati Publishing House, Bulgaria.
- Places to Breathe (2008) – a novel, published by Altera Publishers, Bulgaria.
- Par Avion (2011) – poems, published by Janet 45 Publishers, Bulgaria.
- Egon and the Silence (2015) – selection of short stories, published by Janet 45 Publishers, Bulgaria.
- Home for Beginners (2023) – a novel, published by Janet 45 Publishers, Bulgaria
