= Emanuel =

Emanuel may refer to:

- Emanuel (name), a given name and surname (see there for a list of people with this name)
- Emanuel School, Australia, Sydney, Australia
- Emanuel School, Battersea, London, England
- Emanuel (band), a five-piece rock band from Louisville, Kentucky, United States
- Emanuel County, Georgia
- Emanuel (film), a 2019 documentary film about the Charleston church shooting

== See also ==
- Emmanuel (disambiguation)
- Emanu-El (disambiguation)
- Emmanuelle (disambiguation)
- Immanuel (disambiguation)
- Emmanouil (Εμμανουήλ), the modern Greek form of the name
- Manuel (disambiguation)
