= Manuel Díaz =

Manuel Díaz may refer to:

- Manuel Díaz (fencer) (1874–1929), Cuban fencer who competed at the 1904 Summer Olympics
- Manuel Diaz (tennis), Puerto Rican tennis player and coach
- Manuel Díaz (Mexican cyclist) (1899–?), Mexican cyclist who competed at the 1932 Summer Olympics
- Manuel Díaz Gil (1929–1966), Spanish footballer
- Manuel Díaz Montava (born 1957), Spanish Paralympic cyclist
- Manuel Díaz Vega (born 1954), Spanish football referee

== See also ==
- Manny Diaz (disambiguation)
