= Xavier Manuel =

American football player (born 1987)

No. 55
- Position: Offensive line / fullback

Personal information
- Born: March 20, 1987 (age 39)
- Listed height: 6 ft 1 in (1.85 m)
- Listed weight: 305 lb (138 kg)

Career information
- College: Alabama A&M

Career history
- Colorado Ice (2010–2011); Iowa Barnstormers (2012)

Career AFL statistics
- Rushes: 2
- Yards: 4
- Touchdowns: 1
- Stats at ArenaFan.com

Xavier Manuel (born March 20, 1987) is an American former professional football player. He played for the Iowa Barnstormers of the Arena Football League.
