= Temple Emanu-El (Palm Beach, Florida) =

Synagogue in Palm Beach, Florida

- Location within Florida

Religion
- Affiliation: Conservative Judaism
- Rite: Nusach Ashkenaz; and Sephardi
- Ecclesiastical or organisational status: Synagogue
- Leadership: Rabbi Michael Resnick
- Status: Active

Location
- Location: 190 North County Road, Palm Beach, Florida 33480
- Country: United States
- Coordinates: 26°43′18″N 80°02′18″W

Architecture
- Type: Synagogue
- Established: 1962 (as a congregation)
- Completed: 1974

Specifications
- Capacity: 900
- Materials: Concrete

Website
- www.tepb.org

Temple Emanu-El is a Conservative synagogue centrally located in Palm Beach, Florida, in the United States. The congregation was founded in 1962.

In 1964, the congregation worshipped in premises on Sunrise Avenue. The current site, located at 190 North County Road, was acquired, and the synagogue was dedicated on March 24, 1974. In 2022, Meir Finkelstein became the cantor.
