= Immanuel Frances =

Italian Jewish poet and rabbinical scholar

Immanuel Frances (22 July 1618 (?) – after 1703) was an Italian Jewish poet and rabbinical scholar.

== Biography ==
Born at Mantua, he received his instruction from his elder brother Jacob Frances and from Joseph Firmo of Ancona. In 1674 he was chosen by some Italian communities to represent them in a case against the heirs of R. Zachariah Porto. A responsum by him in this matter is found in She'elot u-Teshubot Mayim Rabbim. Another responsum is cited in Lampronti's Paḥad Yiẓḥaḳ. Both he and his brother Jacob were determined opponents of the followers of Shabbethai Ẓebi, against whom they wrote a volume of poems entitled Ẓebi Muddaḥ (ed. Marco Mortara, in Ḳobeẓ 'al Yad of the Meḳiẓe Nirdamim, 1885). Frances also opposed the cabalists, creating so strong a feeling among the rabbis of Mantua that they destroyed his brother's published poems and forced him (Frances) to leave the city. He wandered from place to place, even to Algiers, settling finally in Livorno. He wrote to his friend Abraham Kokab to protest against his busying himself with classical literature.

In addition to many occasional poems, Frances wrote, in conjunction with his brother Jacob, Wikkuaḥ Itiel we-Ukal, a dialogue on woman, and Wikkuaḥ Libni we-Shim'i, on his brother's poem against the cabalists. Two of Immanuel's poems were published by Nepi-Ghirondi in "Toledot Gedole Yisrael" (pp. 291–293), others by Abraham Baruch Piperno in Ḳol 'Ugab (1846). Immanuel's best-known work is Meteḳ Sefatayim (written in Algiers), a treatise on Hebrew prosody, in which he makes use of a number of his own verses. It has been edited by Henrik Bródy (Hebr. Prosodie von Immanuel Frances, 1892), and translated and thoroughly discussed by Martin Hartmann (Die Hebräische Verskunst, 1894).
