= Temple Emanu-El of West Essex =

Former Reform Jewish synagogue in New Jersey, US

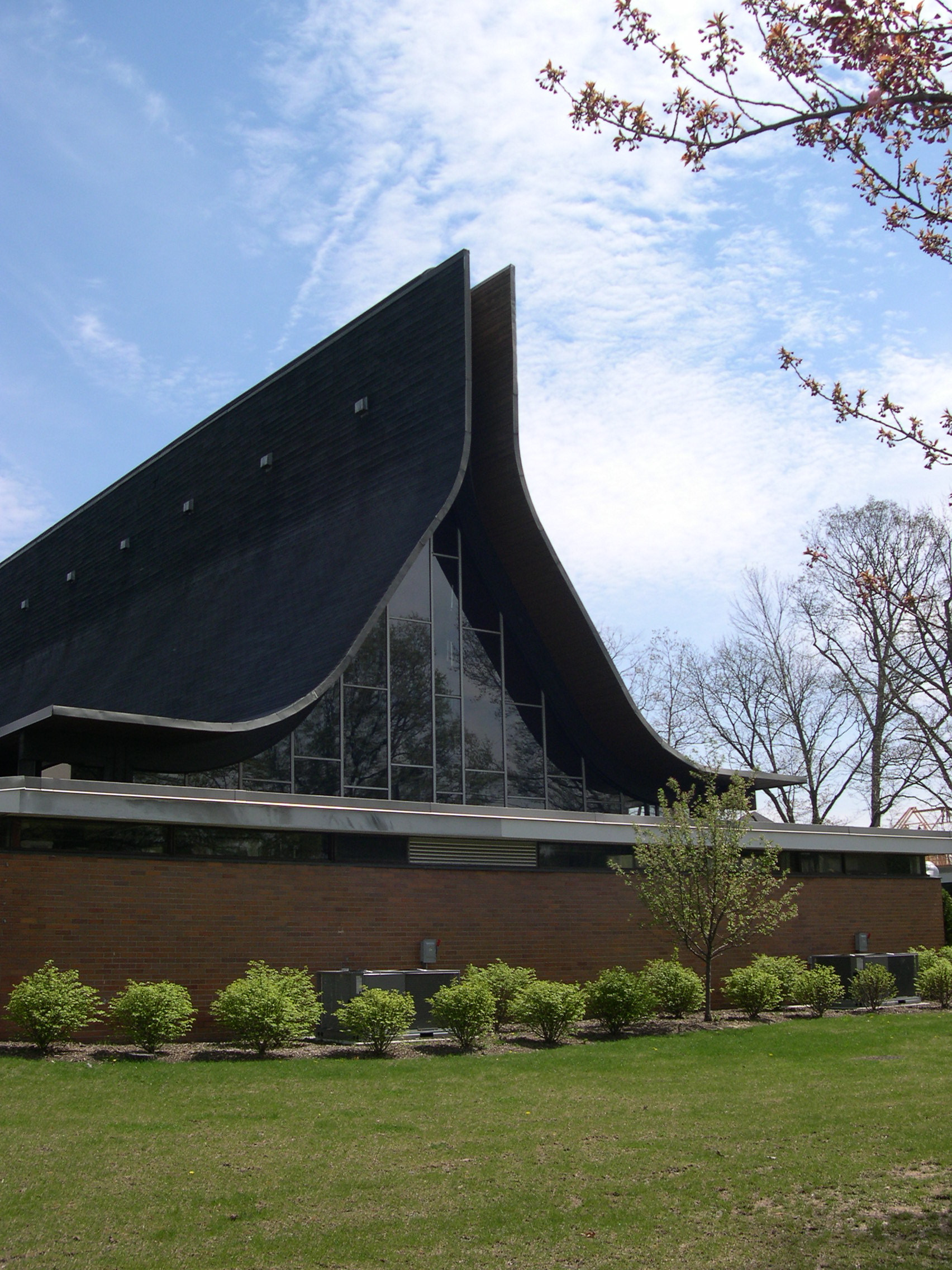
- The former synagogue building

- Location of the former synagogue in Essex County, New Jersey

Religion
- Affiliation: Reform Judaism (former); Christianity (since c. 2018)
- Ecclesiastical or organisational status: Synagogue (1955–2017); Church (c. 2018)
- Status: Closed; merged with Temple Sinai in 2017; building repurposed

Location
- Location: 264 West Northfield Road, Livingston, New Jersey 07039
- Country: United States
- Coordinates: 40°47′16″N 74°20′05″W

Architecture
- Architects: Blake and Nest
- Type: Synagogue
- Established: 1955 (as a congregation)
- Completed: 1962
- Direction of façade: West

Temple Emanu-El of West Essex (transliterated from Hebrew meaning "God is with us") is a former Reform Jewish congregation and synagogue that was located at 264 West Northfield Road, in Livingston, in the West Essex section of New Jersey, in the United States. Founded in 1955, the congregation merged with Temple Sinai in Summit in 2018, due to financial reasons.

The synagogue building was subsequently sold and has become the Living Stone Christian Church (Chinese: 新澤西立石教會), a Mandarin-speaking Christian church. The former early childhood daycare and Hebrew school buildings have become part of a Mandarin and Spanish language immersion center.

== Synagogue history ==
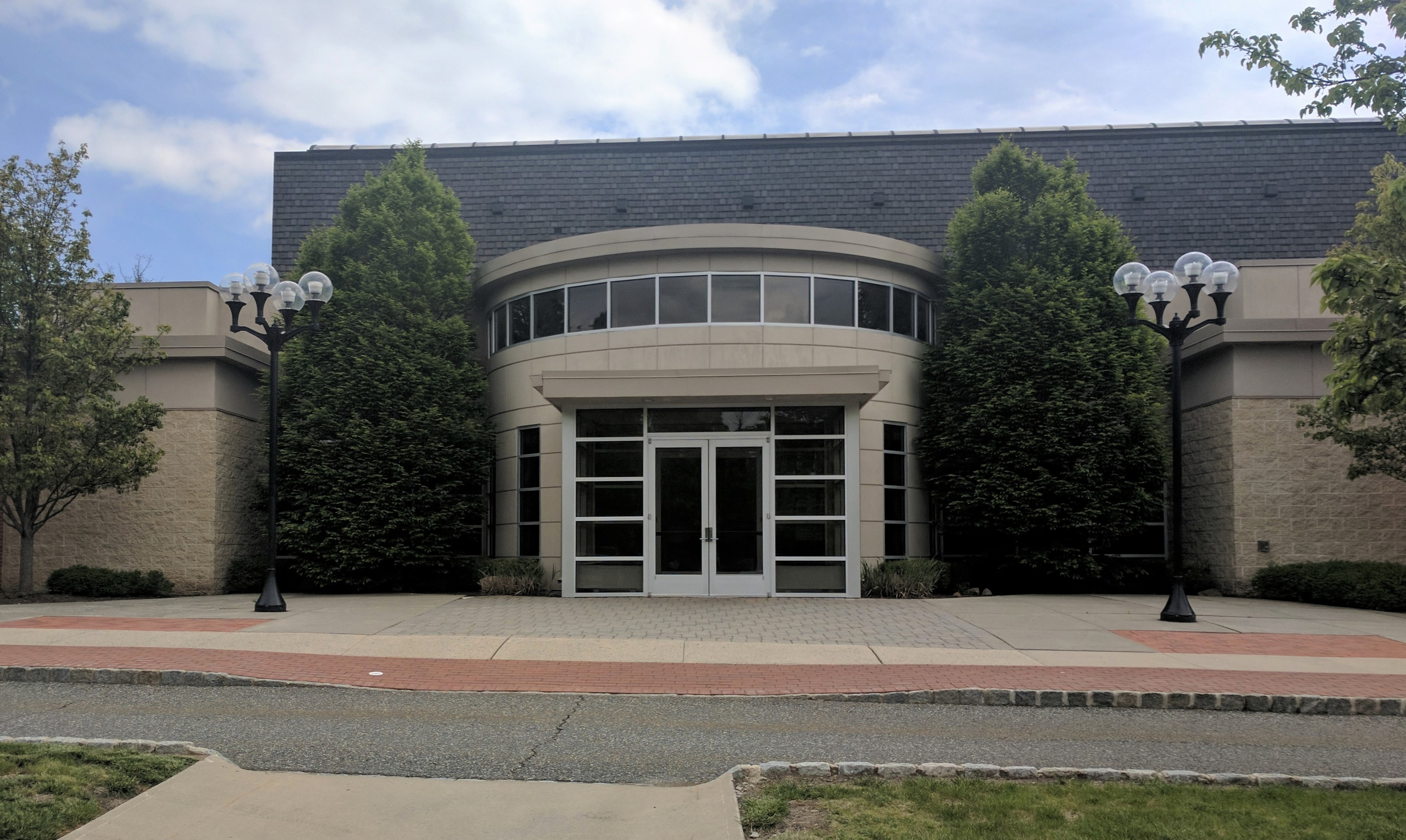
The former synagogue building's main entrance

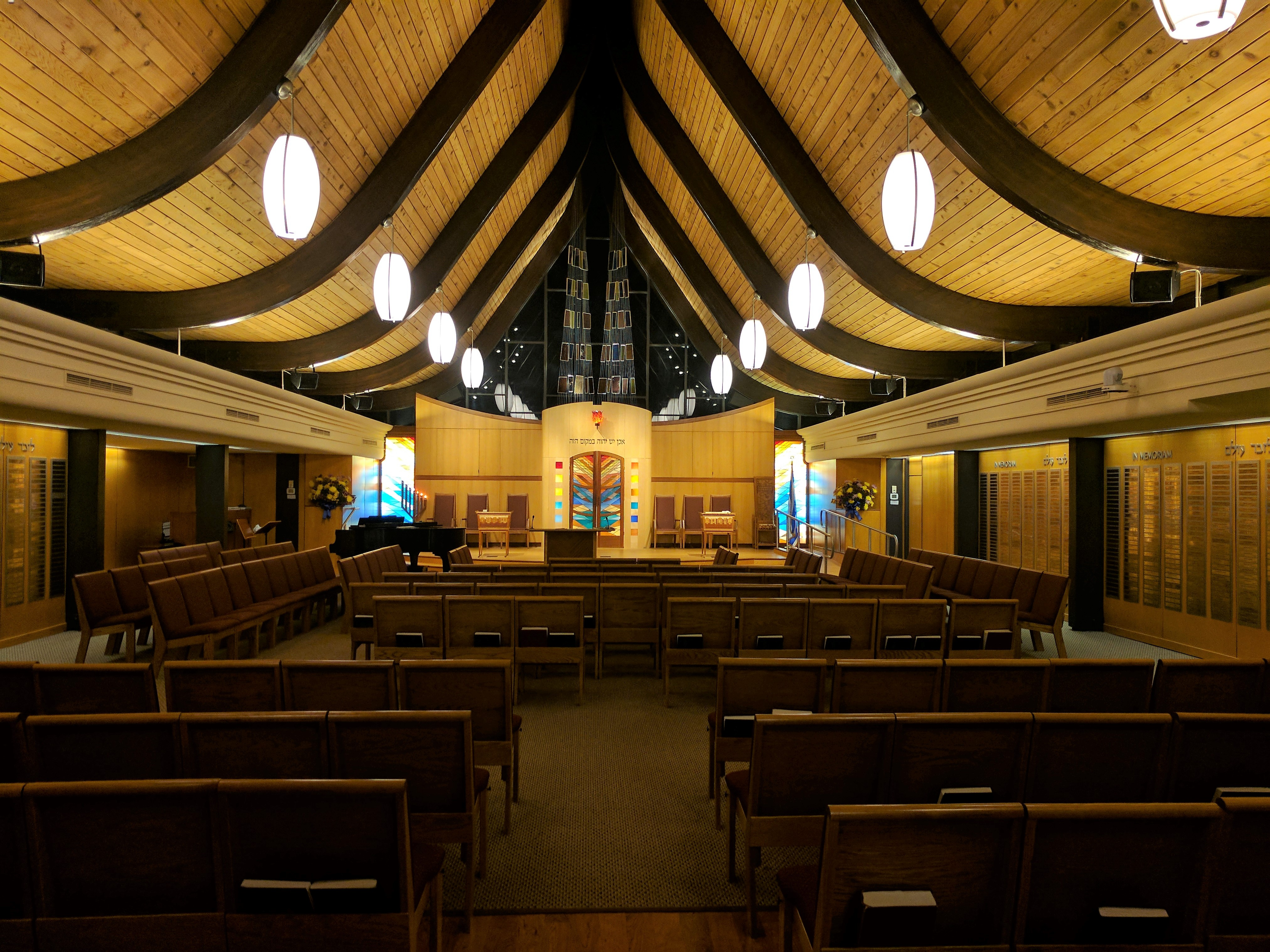
A view from inside the former sanctuary

The congregation was founded by 11 families seeking a Reform Jewish service in the growing suburb of Livingston, New Jersey. By the fall of 1955, 56 families had been recruited and High Holy Days services were led by student Rabbi Milton Rosenfeld from the Hebrew Union College. In 1956, the congregation purchased a hot dog stand off Northfield Road as their permanent home. By 1961, ground had been broken at that location to build their own sanctuary, which was designed by architects Peter Blake and Julian Neski. The new building, with its soaring peaked roof, is a landmark in Livingston and evokes the Israelites' Tent of Meeting in the desert wilderness. Some visitors are said to think it looks like Noah's Ark.

A major expansion of the building including a new main entrance, office space, the library, and the Holocaust Remembrance Center was completed in 2004. This campaign also included a new Early Childhood Center. In 2005-2006, the congregation celebrated its 50th anniversary with year-long programs and events. Although smaller than most of the area congregations, it is known for its haimish attitude and welcoming atmosphere. During the Summer of 2011, the sanctuary was renewed, making it both more modern, and more comfortable. Some changes included a new sound system, bimah, ner tamid, and many new features.

Temple Emanu-El was a member of the Union for Reform Judaism, until its merger with Temple Sinai.

In February 2017, The New Jersey Jewish News and the West Essex Tribune both reported that the congregation voted to disband at the end of June, and the temple's board is negotiating a merger with Temple Sinai in the nearby town of Summit. The Jewish News quoted from an email sent by the temple president that cited financial reasons for the decision.

=== Social action ===
With the creation of a Social Action Committee in 1964 and the hiring of Rabbi Peter Kasdan in 1971, Emanu-El established itself as a leader on social justice issues. Kasdan organized a nationwide Reform Jewish boycott of grapes in support of the United Farm Workers. The synagogue participated in rallies, marches, and programs on issues such as Soviet Jewry, Ethiopian Jews, Abortion Rights, and Vietnamese boat people. The congregation adopted and supported one Vietnamese family for years. In more recent years, issues such as Reform rights in Israel, Darfur, Gay & Lesbian rights, and Jewish genetic diseases have been at the forefront.

=== Other programs ===
Expanding approaches to welcoming interfaith families and Jews-by-Choice, Temple Emanu-El was an inaugural participant in the STAR Synagogue's "Calling Synagogue Home" project.

Temple Emanu-El received an Honorable Mention for the Union for Reform Judaism's Congregation of Learner's Award for Adult Education at the Union's Biennial in 2007. Numerous individual Temple members have achieved at least 100 hours of Jewish study to earn the URJ Keva Award since the program was brought to the Temple in 2005.

=== Former clergy ===
Rabbi Kasdan led Temple Emanu-El for 30 years until his retirement in 2001 when he was named Rabbi Emeritus. Known most widely for his social action work, Kasdan created and was president of the Livingston Interfaith Clergy. He led 8 adult bat mitzvah classes and was widely regarded for his work with youth through the Religious Action Center, Kutz Camp, and NFTY being awarded NFTY life membership in 1984 and the Rabbi Samuel Cook Award for lifetime contribution in youth work in 2007 by the Central Conference of American Rabbis.

The congregation was led from July 1, 2012 until May 18, 2016 by Rabbi Greg Litcofsky. Originally from Philadelphia, Pennsylvania, Litcofsky had been an Associate Rabbi at Temple Shir Tikva in Wayland, Massachusetts. He encouraged a climate of diversity and integration among Temple committees and the Jewish community. Programmatic focus includes worship, youth activities, adult education, outreach, social action, and leading his first synagogue-wide trip to Israel in 2013.

==== Former rabbis ====
The following individuals have served as rabbi of Temple Emanuel-El:

- Milton Rosenfeld (1955–1957)
- Harold T. Miller (1957–1959)
- Herbert Rose (1959–1963)
- Kenneth Rivkin (1963–1971)
- Peter E. Kasdan (1971–2001) (Emeritus 2001–present)
- Daniel E. Levin (2001–2004)
- Mark Kaiserman (2004–2012)
- Greg Litcofsky (2012–2016)
- Marc Disick (2016-2017)

=== Notable former members ===
- Mike Chernoff (born c. 1981), general manager of the Cleveland Indians
