= Manoel =

Manoel may refer to:

== People ==
- Manoel (name), a given name and surname
- Manoel (footballer, born 1953) (1953–2015), Brazilian football forward
- Manoel (footballer, born 1978), Brazilian football forward
- Manoel (footballer, born 1989), Brazilian football forward
- Manoel (footballer, born 1990), Brazilian football defender
- Manoel (footballer, born 1991), Brazilian football striker

== Other uses ==
- Manoel Island, in Marsamxett Harbour, Malta
- Manoel Theatre, Valletta, Malta
