= Manuel Galilea Widmer =

Chilean politician

Manuel Galilea Widmer (born 26 August 1928) is a Chilean politician. A member of the Christian Democratic Party, he served in the Chamber of Deputies of Chile.
