= Manolis Xexakis =

Greek poet and prose writer (born 1948)

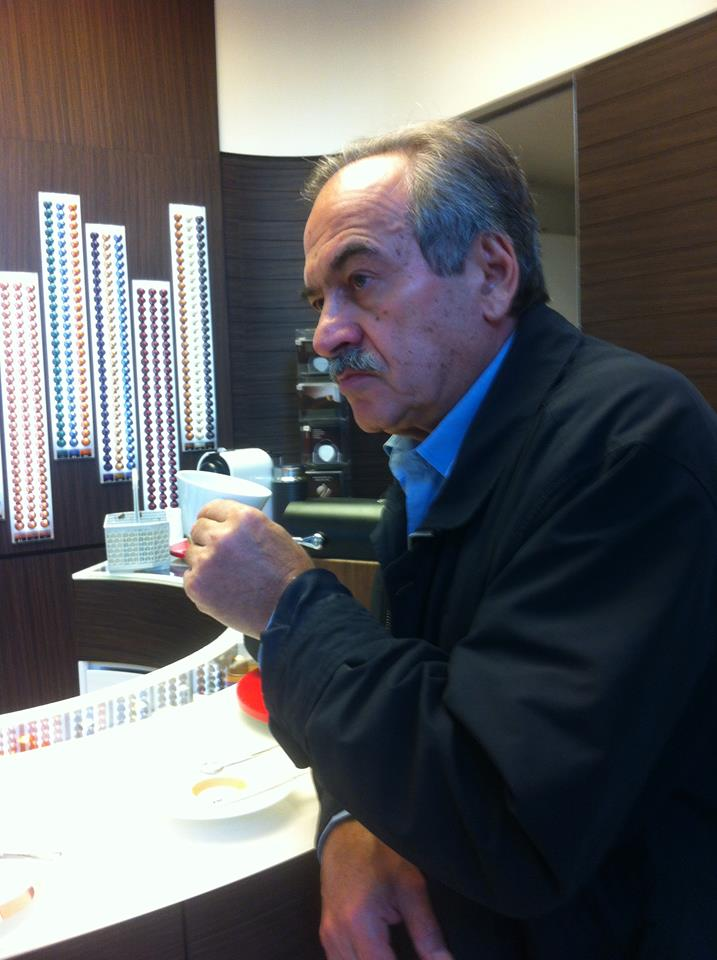
- Born: 1948 (age 77–78); Rethymnon, Greece
- Occupations: poet, prose writer
- Writing career
- Period: 1977–

Manolis Xexakis (Greek: Μανόλης Ξεξάκης) (born 1948 in Rethymnon, Crete) is a Greek poet and prose writer. He studied physics and mathematics at the University of Thessaloniki. He has worked as a journalist, teacher, and also in advertising.

== Poetry ==
- Ασκήσεις Μαθηματικών (Math Exercises), 1980
- Πλόες ερωτικοί (Erotic Sea Ways), 1980
- Κάτοπτρα μελαγχολικού λόγου (Mirrors of Melancholic Word), 1987

== Prose ==
- Ο θάνατος του ιππικού (The Death of the Cavalry), 1977
- Πού κούκος; Πού άνεμος; (Where the Cuckoo? Where the Wind?), 1987
- Σονάτα κομπολογιών (A String of Beads Sonata), 2000
