= Manuel Hailfinger =

German politician (born 1982)

Member of the Landtag of Baden-Württemberg
- Incumbent
- Assumed office 11 May 2021
- Constituency: Hechingen-Münsingen

Personal details
- Born: 7 May 1982 (age 43)
- Party: Christian Democratic Union (since 2003)

Manuel Hailfinger (born 7 May 1982) is a German politician serving as a member of the Landtag of Baden-Württemberg since 2021. He has served as group leader of the Christian Democratic Union in the municipal council of Sonnenbühl since 2017.
