= Manualist =

A manualist is a person who does:

- Manualism (hand music)
- Sign Language
- Manual communication
- Signing Exact English
- French Sign Language
