= Imanol Ortiz =

Spanish musician and producer

Imanol Ortiz Amuriza (1960 in Bilbao – 2011 in Havana) was a Spanish musician and producer based in Cuba. He was considered a reference figure of the so-called Latin-jazz movement. Percussionist by profession, leader of the musical group "Somos Amigos", he developed an important activity in the organization and production of different musical events in Cuba and Spain, always in relation to Cuban music. He was nominated several times for the Grammy Awards and was awarded the "Concha de Plata" at San Sebastian Jazz Festival.

== Biography ==
Imanol Ortiz Amuriza was born in Bilbao, in the Basque Country, Spain on June 15, 1960. He studied music at the jazz school in Barcelona and percussion and drums in Havana (Cuba) where he graduated, in 1994, at the PERCUBA institution in Havana. In 1984 he completed his training as percussionist in Venezuela and Colombia studying Latin rhythms. From 1991 to 1993 he studied with Tata Güines and Changuito in Cuba.

He dedicated himself to percussion instruments playing tumbadoras, bongoes, timbales and minor percussion. He began his career as a musician in 1981, playing with the group "Dutch funky" in Amsterdam. He made several recordings and worked with the English "Hondo" (a reggae music group) in 1983.

In 1985 he arrived in Havana and started working with the Tropicana Club percussion corps. Shortly after, he founded in Bilbao, the Latin-jazz sextet Sabana, who won the first prize at the San Sebastian Jazz Festival in 1987.

He worked with the salsa and Latin-jazz orchestra "Experimental" de San Juan de Puerto Rico and collaborated with Omar Cuevas and Jesús García (Chunguito) in Barcelona.

In 1990 he did different works and collaborations in the "Ciudad Condal" (he worked with guitarist Jordi Bonell and drummer Andreu Simón in different formations and with Gato Pérez and Jordi Bonell among others). He won the 2nd prize at the Guecho Jazz Festival with his group Sabana.

In 1992 he created the group "Azúcar" in Havana, receiving a special mention at the "Bananas" festival in Ecuador and a remarkable success in Mexico.

In 1995 he founded the instrumental sextet "Somos amigos" (We are friends) and recorded in 1996 the album Da Cappo. He participated as percussionist in the flamenco album Undebel by Diego el Cigala, published in 1998.

In 1999 he recorded the second album of "Somos amigos" titled Pa' Gozar and in 2001 he recorded the third album titled Somos Amigos in the ICAIC studios in Havana, an album that was very well received in the U.S. and Europe. With "Somos Amigos" he recorded, between 2001 and 2004, the albums Buscando el Rumbo, La Galea and Imaginate Cuba. In 2005 he was nominated for a Grammy for the song "Aquellas Pequeñas Cosas" which is included in the album Cuba le Canta a Serrat, project produced by Ortiz, as well as the tribute to Joaquín Sabina, La Habana le canta a Sabina. On the album, Pablo Milanés performs 'Canción para la Magdalena'; his daughter Haydée Milanés, 'Que se llama Soledad'; while troubadour Carlos Varela sings 'Tan Joven y Tan Viejo'. Also Amaury Pérez ('A la sombra de un león'), the duo Buena Fe ('La canción más hermosa del mundo'), Carlos Kalunga ('Quién me ha robado el mes de abril'), Jessica Rodríguez ('Contigo') and Ivette Cepeda ('Como un dolor de muelas'). Also performing were Pancho Amat & El Cabildo del Son and pianist Frank Fernández ('A la sombra de un león').

In 2007 Pio Leyva's group "Sonsoneando" joined the band "Somos amigos" and made several international tours.

In 2007 he was the promoter of "Vive Cuba", a multidisciplinary project that integrated 26 renowned Cuban artists to pay tribute to Compay Segundo, the legendary member of "Buena Vista Social Club". The international tour of Vive Cuba show reached Spain, England, Germany and Holland and Latin American countries such as Colombia, Mexico, Puerto Rico and the Dominican Republic. Compay Segundo's own group, led by his sons Salvador and Basilio, the painter Eduardo Roca 'Choco', and actor Jorge Perugorría, among others, took part in the show. August 19, 2011 he died in Havana.

== Discography of "Somos amigos" ==
- Da Cappo. 1996.
- Pa’ Gozar. 1999.
- Somos Amigos. 2001, Discográfica Envidia
- Buscando el Rumbo. 2003, Discográfica Discmeri
- La Galea. 2003, Discográfica Discmeri
- Imagínate Cuba. 2003, Discográfica Discmeri
- Cuba le canta a Serrat. 2005, Discográfica Discmeri
