= Mannie =

Mannie is a given name. Notable people with the name include:

- Mannie Fresh, (born 1974), currently an artist and hip-hop producer who records for Def Jam South
- Mannie Garcia, American freelance photojournalist currently based in Washington, D.C.
- Mannie Heymans (born 1971), Namibian cyclist
- Mannie Jackson (born 1939), the chairman and owner of the Harlem Globetrotters, for whom he played from 1962 to 1964

== See also ==
- "The Mannie" a name for the statue erected in memory of George Leveson-Gower, 1st Duke of Sutherland on Ben Bhraggie, Scotland
