= Emmanouil Lampakis =

Greek painter

- Εμμανουήλ Λαμπάκης
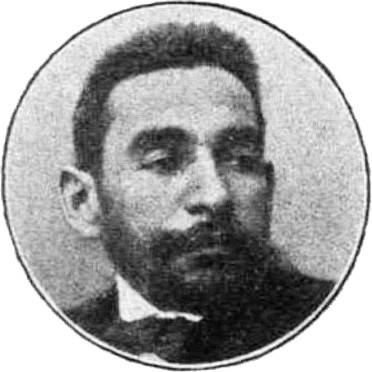
- Lampakis in 1906
- Born: 1859; Athens, Greece
- Died: 1909 (aged 49–50); Athens, Greece
- Occupation: Painter

Emmanouil Lampakis (Greek: Εμμανουήλ Λαμπάκης, 1859–1909) was a Greek painter, a member of the academic Munich School of the 19th century.

== Life ==
Emmanouil Lampakis was born in Athens in 1859. He studied at the Athens School of Fine Arts. In 1881 he went to Munich with a scholarship and studied at the Munich Academy under Nikolaos Gyzis. He returned from Munich in 1885, and in July 1886 exhibited two genre works at the Mela Hotel in Kifissia. In 1889 he assisted in the restoration of mosaics at the Daphni Monastery, and exhibited a genre painting and a portrait of his mother at the Exposition Universelle in Paris. He received a first prize for the portrait. In 1893 he was elected president of the Christian Archaeological Society. He continued to exhibit in group and solo exhibitions, and earned a growing reputation. He taught at the Athens School of Fine Arts from 1903 to 1907. He died in Athens in 1909.

== Work ==
Lampakis was deeply influenced by Gyzis. He painted portraits, genre scenes and religious works characterized by low-key simplicity and sensitivity. He was praised for his use of perspective. Two of his paintings are held by the National Gallery of Greece.

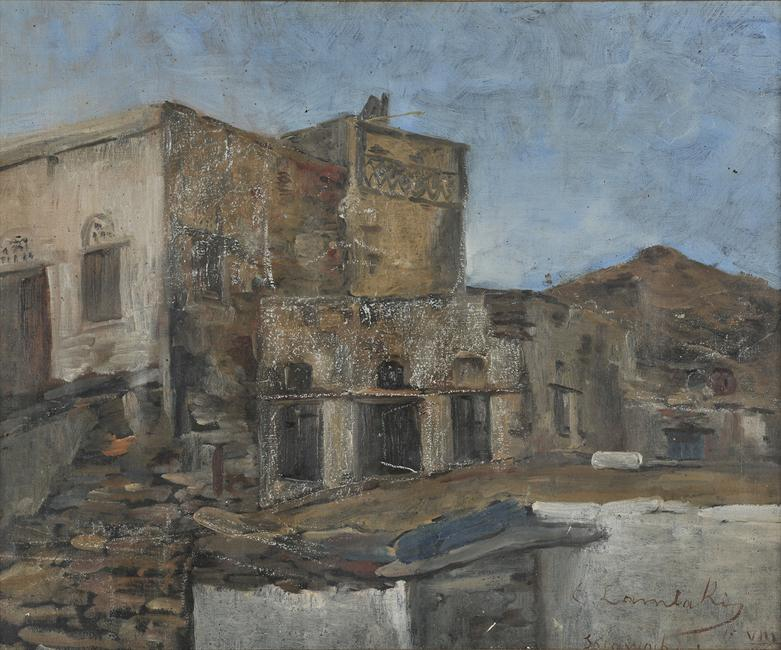
Sklavochori, home of Gyzis

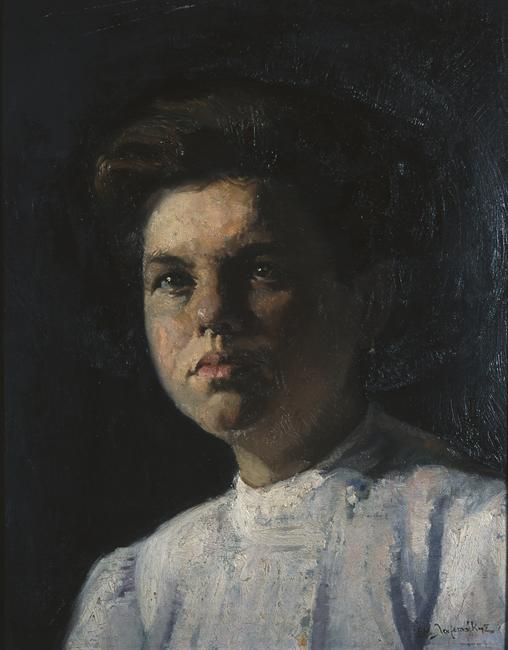
Portrait of daughter with white dress

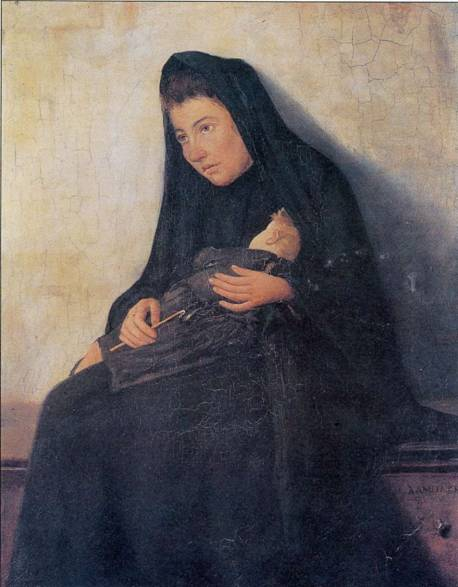
The Promise

== Sources ==
- "Εμμανουήλ Λαμπάκης", ΑΡΧΕΙΟ ΟΙΚΟΓΕΝΕΙΑΣ ΛΑΜΠΑΚΗ (in Greek), archived from the original on 2016-03-05
- "Εμμανουήλ Λαμπάκης", Lampakis Family Archives (in Greek)
- "Λαμπάκης Εμμανουήλ", National Gallery of Greece (in Greek), archived from the original on 2016-03-03
