= Emmanuel Goldstein (disambiguation) =

Emmanuel Goldstein is a key character in George Orwell's novel Nineteen Eighty-Four.

Emmanuel Goldstein may also refer to:

- Emmanuel Goldstein, pen name of Eric Corley, editor of the hacker magazine 2600: The Hacker Quarterly
- Emmanuel Goldstein alias Cereal Killer, fictional character in the 1995 film Hackers
