= Temple Emanuel (Creve Coeur, Missouri) =

Reform synagogue in Missouri, U.S.

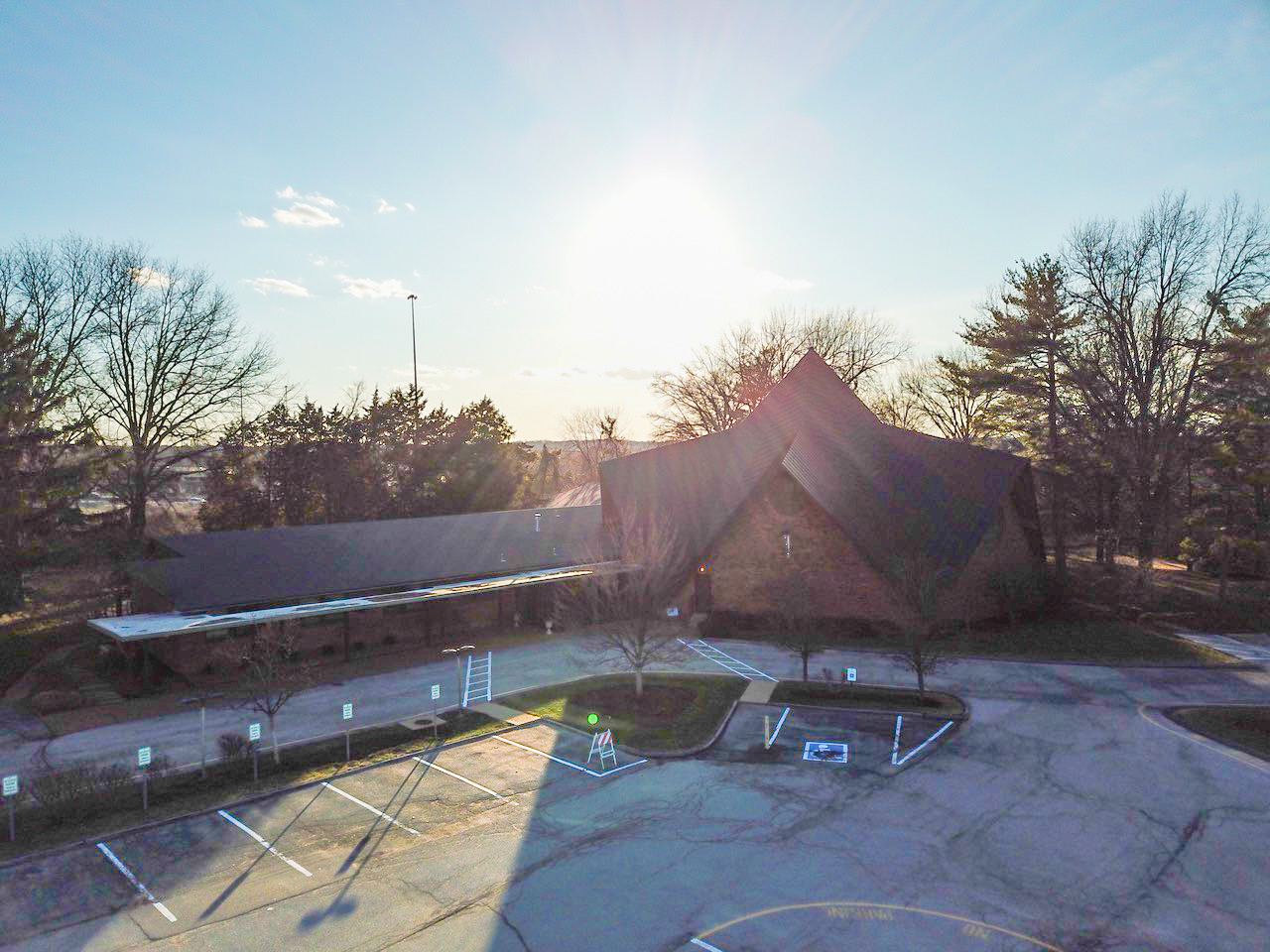
- Temple Emanuel in 2018

- Location in Missouri

Religion
- Affiliation: Reform Judaism
- Ecclesiastical or organizational status: Synagogue
- Leadership: Rabbi Elizabeth Hersh; Rabbi Joseph R. Rosenblum (Emeritus )
- Status: Active

Location
- Location: 12166 Conway Road, Creve Coeur, Missouri
- Country: United States
- Interactive map of Temple Emanuel
- Coordinates: 38°38′29″N 90°26′51″W

Architecture
- Architect: William Bernoudy
- Type: Synagogue
- Style: Modernist
- Established: 1956 (as a congregation)
- Groundbreaking: 1961
- Completed: 1962
- Materials: Roof: Laminated wood beams, decking, copper

Website
- testl.org

Temple Emanuel is a Reform Jewish synagogue located at 12166 Conway Road, near the corner of New Ballas Road, in Creve Coeur, Missouri, in the United States. Organized in 1956, it is affiliated with the Union for Reform Judaism (UAHC). It has a membership of 300 families.

The Temple is notable not only for its size, but for its unique Modernist architecture.

== History ==
A group of parents in the area first had the idea to form a synagogue in the 1940s as a way to further their children's religious education. They founded St. Louis School for Judaism in September 1953 and organized the synagogue in 1956, choosing the name "Temple Emanuel" on December 16, 1956. It was the first Reform congregation founded in St. Louis in 70 years. The congregation initially had 48 families, and services were held at the Bible Presbyterian Church. Construction at the Conway Road site began in September 1961, and the completed building was dedicated in January 1963. The synagogue is affiliated with [the Union for Reform Judaism, which was formerly called] the UAHC.

In March 2008, the synagogue and Temple Israel in Creve Coeur (which had approximately 1,000 families) announced a plan to merge, which would have created a congregation of 1,400 families, one of the area's largest Reform Jewish congregations. After two months of discussions among some leaders of the synagogues, the matter became public when the two Boards of Directors were asked for their input. The membership of Temple Emanuel were given presentations on possible merger in April. The school enrollment had declined from 137 students in 2001 to 79 students in 2008. Ultimately, after 2/3 of congregants indicated that they preferred independence in balloting the following month, the congregation decided overwhelmingly to remain independent.

In 2010, Temple Emanuel mounted an exhibition of black and white photographs of Albanian Muslims who rescued 2,000 Jews during the Holocaust. Its rabbi said a goal of the congregation with the exhibit was "to tell people ... these are examples of Muslim-Jewish respect, tolerance and love."

== Services, classes, and programs ==
The synagogue provides Shabbat and Sunday religious services. Temple Emanuel instituted its Sunday services in 1958, decades after the Sunday-Sabbath movement in American Reform Judaism had largely ended.

It also provides Sunday religious school and Hebrew in preparation for Bar/Bat Mitzvah, as well as Torah study and adult learning courses. In addition, it provides programs on interfaith issues and family learning, as well as youth and senior programs.

== Membership, clergy, and leadership ==
As of 2016, the synagogue had a membership of about 250 families.

Temple Emanuel's Senior Rabbi is Elizabeth Hersh. Its Rabbi Emeritus and Senior Scholar is Dr. Joseph R. Rosenbloom, who has been rabbi at the synagogue for more than 42 years. Since 1977, the temple's "Cantorial Soloist" has been Malachi Owens, a non-Jewish African American who worked as an electrical engineer and has also been a Baptist minister since 1998.

== Design ==
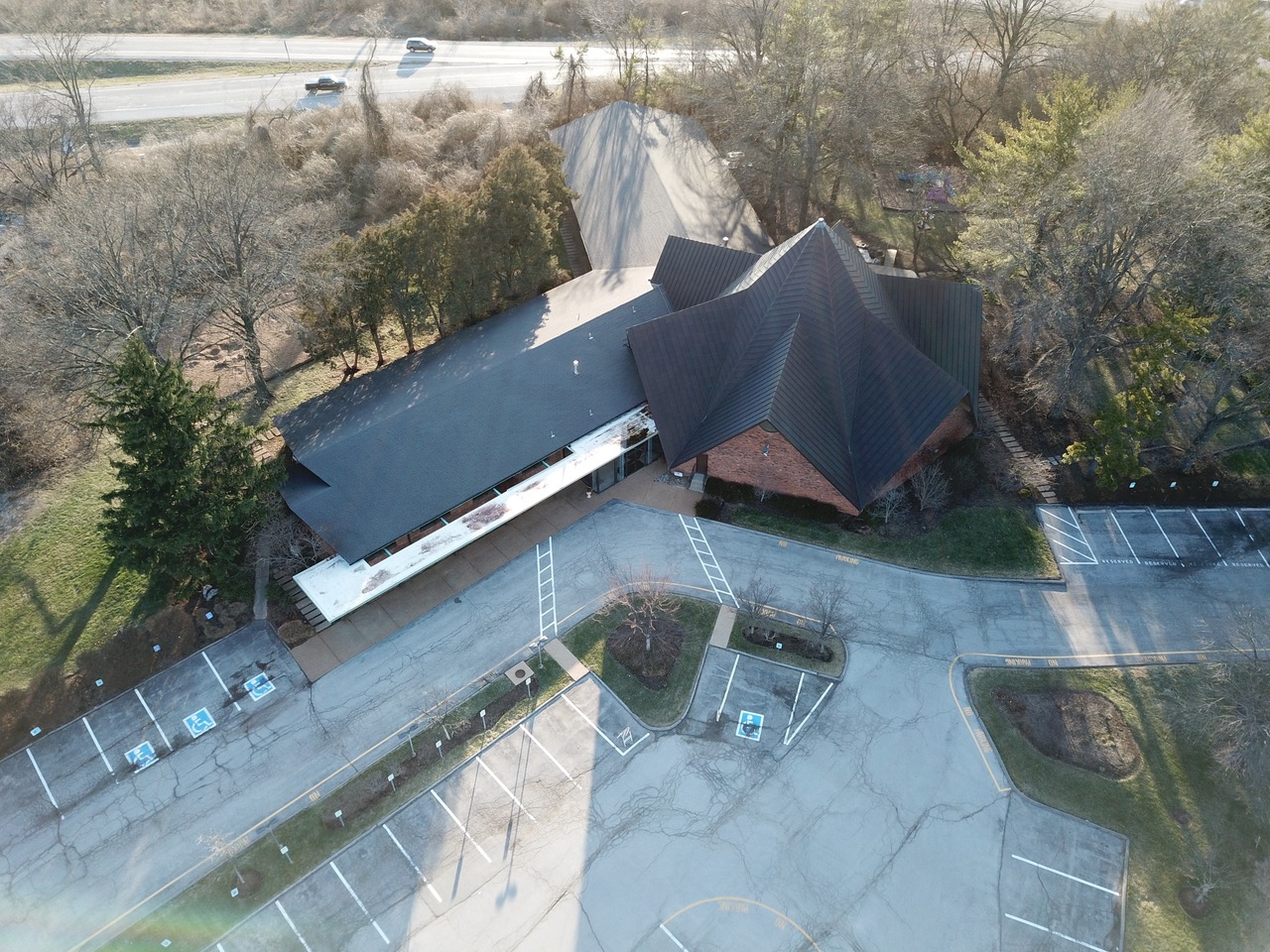
Star of David design visible from above

Its 1962 building in the St. Louis suburb of Creve Coeur, Missouri, was designed by architect William Bernoudy, of the firm Bernoudy-Mutrux-Bauer, which was known for its originality. It was designed in the shape of the six-pointed Jewish star. The congregation owns the building, and the land on which it sits.

The St. Louis County Historic Buildings Commission has named the synagogue an outstanding example of mid-century Modern architecture worthy of preservation.
