= Emmanuel Ray =

English activist (born 1980)

Emmanuel Ray (Naveen Emmanuel - Rajaratnam)
- Born: September 27, 1980 (age 46); Sri Lanka
- Occupation: Television presenter
- Modeling information
- Hair color: Black
- Eye color: Black
- Website: emmanuelray.com

Emmanuel Ray, born Naveen Emmanuel - Rajaratnam, previously worked as a London-based presenter and human rights activist, known for his column, Diary of an It Boy. On August 10, 2009, he established a company named Socialite Evenings Limited. The company changed its name on December 13, 2010, to Emmanuel Ray Promotions Limited and closed down on April 29, 2014. Emmanuel won Fashion Icon of the Year 2011 at Fashions Finest Awards UK, and was nominated for London Personality of the Year at London Lifestyle Awards 2012.

== Career ==
Emmanuel has appeared, presented at and reported from a variety of shows including London Fashion Week, Clothes Show Live, Ideal Home Show, Alternative Fashion Week, The Only Way is Essex Christmas special, Made in Chelsea, and various showbiz parties, launch events and fashion shows. He has also hosted media events at the BBC TV Centre and BBC White City and appeared on BBC One, RTÉ, S4C, World Fashion Channel, Fashion TV, Vogue TV, GBC, BBC Asian Network, Brit Asia TV, YGTV, Spectrum FM, SLBC, ITN, E4, ITV, Break London Radio, On FM, Gaydar Radio, and Stonewall Live USA amongst other platforms.

Ray inaugurated Fashion Week Gibraltar in Spring/Summer 2012. In the same year, he reported from Brighton Fashion Week and presented at the annual 46th Botswana Independence Day celebrations in London.

He wrote a society column, Diary of an It Boy, in 2009. The column gave an account of fashion, show business and lifestyle from a man's perspective. It first appeared in Express Broadcast UK's website, and on Pride Life Magazine. From 2010 onwards, the column appeared on Laissez Faire, a London-based free newspaper focusing exclusively on art and culture. 'Diary of an It Boy' was also the newspaper's only column to appear in print twice, and in five digital publications simultaneously, on a monthly basis; Superstar Magazine, Break London Radio's website, The Style Column, Work in Fashion, My Kali Mag and kontraPLAN fashion journal.

He then started working as a masseuse under the name Shiraz Roy, once his fashion career became non existent.

== Activism ==
Ray has supported human rights and peace campaigns, representing Britain in Los Angeles's celebrity-led NOH8 Campaign against California Proposition 8 supporting marriage equality, and in the international All Out campaign for against the Ugandan government's controversial Kill The Gays bill. He was also involved in the Ministry for Peace campaign in British Parliament, 4D for World Peace by Uniting for Peace, and has campaigned for the Ceylon Workers Congress in Sri Lanka, supporting poor manual laborers in the tea plantation sector.
