= Immanuel Munk =

German physiologist (1852–1903)

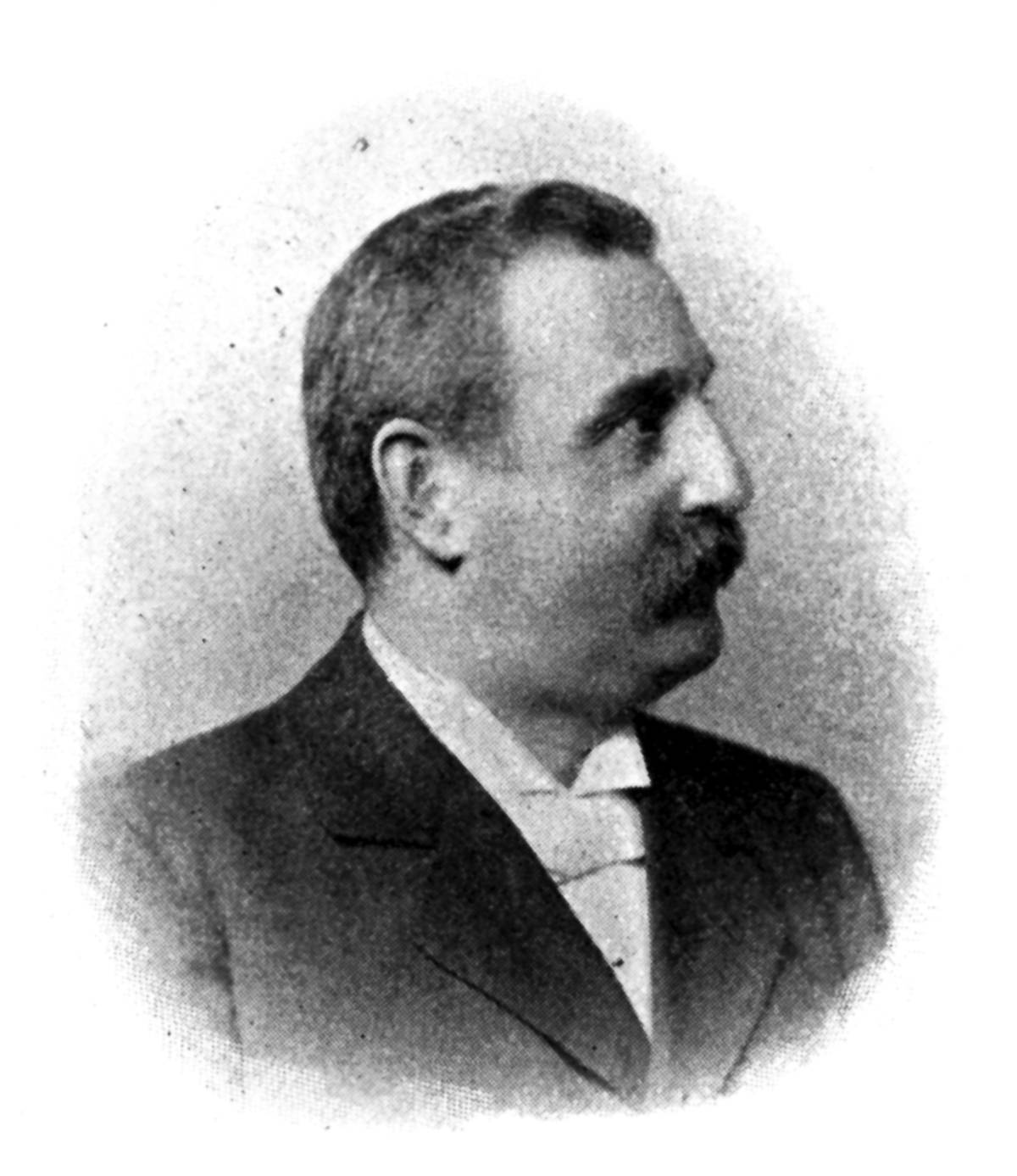
Immanuel Munk (1852–1903)

Immanuel Munk (30 May 1852 – 1 August 1903) was a German physiologist. He was the younger brother of physiologist Hermann Munk (1839–1912).

Munk was born in Posen. He studied medicine at the Universities of Berlin, Breslau, and Strasbourg, obtaining his doctorate in 1873 with the thesis Versuche über die Wirkung des Kryptopins. At Berlin, his influences included pharmacologist Oskar Liebreich and chemist Ernst Leopold Salkowski. In 1883, he began work as a lecturer in physiology and physiological chemistry, and from 1895, he was an associate professor to the Faculty of Medicine in Berlin. In 1899, he attained a full professorship. He died in Berlin.

His research primarily dealt with issues pertaining to nutrition, metabolism, urinary secretions, and the absorption/formation of animal body fat, to name a few. His scientific papers appeared mainly in "Virchows Archiv", "Pflüger's Archiv", and in the physiological division of the "Archiv für Anatomie und Physiologie". In 1897, he became editor of the periodical Centralblatt für Physiologie.

== Published works ==
- Physiologie des Menschen und der Säugethiere : Lehrbuch für Studirende und aerzte, 1881.
- Die Ernährung des gesunden und kranken Menschen : Handbuch der Diätetik für Arzte, Verwaltungsbeamte und Vorsteher von Heil- und Pflege-Anstalten, 1887 – A handbook of dietetics co-authored with University of Rostock hygienist Julius Uffelmann. Its third edition was published in 1895 by Munk and Carl Anton Ewald.
- Einzelernährung und Massenernährung, 1893 : included in Theodor Weyl's "Handbuch der Hygiene".
