= Manel del Valle =

Spanish chemist

Manel del Valle Zafra is a Spanish chemist, who is active in the field of analytical chemistry; he is a professor of the Autonomous University of Barcelona (AUB) and founder of the university Group of sensors and biosensors.

== Literature ==
- C. S. Pundir, Seema Jakhar, Vinay Narwal. Determination of urea with special emphasis on biosensors: A review // Biosensors and Bioelectronics. — 2019. — January (vol. 123). — P. 36–50. — ISSN 0956-5663. — DOI:10.1016/j.bios.2018.09.067.
- Mahdi Ghasemi-Varnamkhasti, Constantin Apetrei, Jesus Lozano, Amarachukwu Anyogu. Potential use of electronic noses, electronic tongues and biosensors as multisensor systems for spoilage examination in foods // Trends in Food Science & Technology. — 2018. — October (vol. 80). — P. 71–92. — ISSN 0924-2244. — DOI:10.1016/j.tifs.2018.07.018.

== Web-sources ==
- "Manel del Valle Zafra: Titular d'universitat". Departament de Química, Autonomous University of Barcelona.
