= Manny Diaz =

Manny Diaz may refer to:

- Manny Diaz (American football) (born 1974), American college football coach and son of Manny Diaz (Florida politician)
- Manny Diaz (California politician) (born 1953), former California State Assemblyman
- Manny Diaz (Florida politician) (born 1954), former mayor of Miami and father of Manny Diaz (American football)
- Manny Díaz Jr. (born 1973), former Education Commissioner of Florida, president of the University of West Florida

== See also ==
- Manuel Díaz (disambiguation)
