= Manuela Schmidt =

German politician (born 1963)

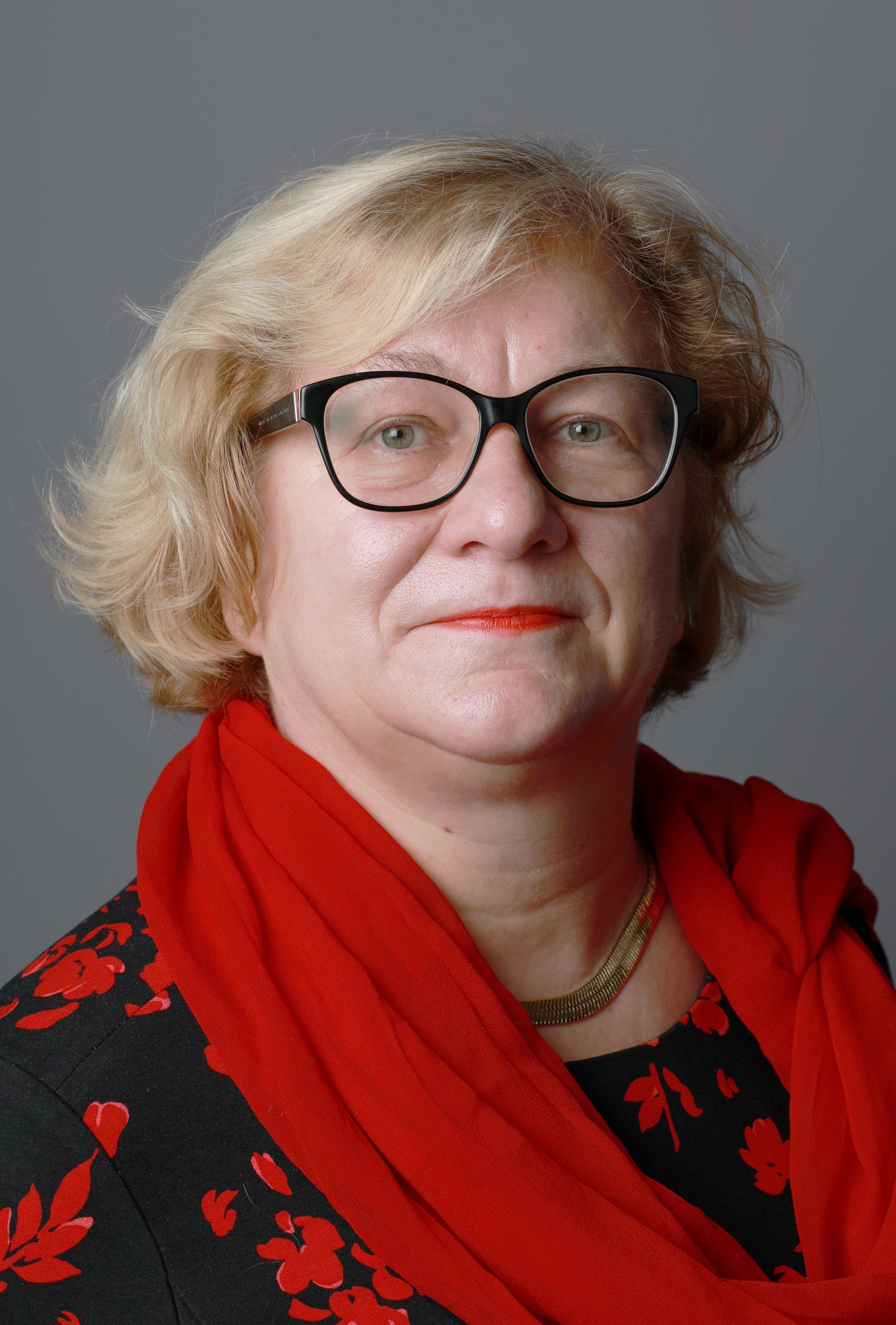
- Manuela Schmidt in 2017

Member of the Abgeordnetenhaus of Berlin
- Incumbent
- Assumed office 2011

Personal details
- Born: 13 July 1963 (age 63) Großenhain
- Party: Die Linke
- Education: Humboldt University of Berlin

Manuela Schmidt (born 13 July 1963) is a German politician (PDS, Die Linke). She is Vice President of the Abgeordnetenhaus of Berlin.

== Life ==
Manuela Schmidt studied education at the Humboldt University of Berlin from 1982 to 1987, graduating with a diploma in teaching. She continued her studies from 1987 to 1990, receiving her doctorate in education. After completing her studies, she worked at the Humboldt University in Berlin in 1991, and from 1992 to 1993 as a personal assistant to the President of the Humboldt University, Marlis Dürkop-Leptihn. After completing further training as an education and human resources officer from 1994 to 1995, she worked as a project manager at Mittendrin in Hellersdorf – an association for the integration of people with disabilities – from 1995 to 2001. Schmidt is married and has one child.

In December 2021, she was elected President of the Humanistischer Verband Deutschlands Berlin-Brandenburg.

== Political career ==
Manuela Schmidt has been a member of the PDS (Party of Democratic Socialism) or The Left Party since 2002. From 2001 to 2004, she served as District Councillor for Youth, Family, and Health in the Marzahn-Hellersdorf district, and from 2005 to 2011, she served as District Councillor for Youth and Family.

In the elections to the Berlin House of Representatives in 2011, 2016 and 2021, she received a direct mandate in the Marzahn-Hellersdorf 2 constituency. In the repeat election in 2023, she lost the direct mandate to Olga Gauks from the CDU but was able to defend her seat in the House of Representatives. She was a member of the main committee and spokesperson for the districts.

In October 2012, she was elected to the state executive committee of the Berlin Left Party.

== See also ==
- List of members of the 19th Abgeordnetenhaus of Berlin (2021–2023)
- List of members of the 19th Abgeordnetenhaus of Berlin (2023–2026)
