= Manuel Litzke =

Austrian politician (born 1999)

Member of the National Council
- Incumbent
- Assumed office 24 October 2024
- Constituency: Vorarlberg South

Personal details
- Born: 12 July 1999 (age 26)
- Party: Freedom Party

Manuel Litzke (born 12 July 1999) is an Austrian politician of the Freedom Party. He was elected member of the National Council in the 2024 legislative election, and has served as leader of the Freedom Party's youth wing in Vorarlberg since 2022.
