= Helen Fessas-Emmanouil =

Helen Fessas-Emmanouil (born . Volos ,1943) is a Greek architect specializing in theatre architecture. An assistant professor at the University of Athens, she has published a number of essays and books on modern Greek architecture.

Fessas studied architecture at the National Technical University of Athens (1962–1967) where her doctorate thesis was Theatre Architecture in Modern Greece.

In 1993, she was appointed assistant professor at the Department of Theatrical Studies at Athens University. Over the past 20 years, she has worked as a historian in the area of modern Greek architecture, writing articles in Greek and foreign publications. In 1995, Fessas-Emmanouil was awarded the Athens Academy Prize for her two-volume book Theatre Architecture in Modern Greece.

== Own publications ==
Fessas-Emmanouil's publications include:

- Built environments for urban cultural activities in the context of a comprehensive national plan for cultural decentralisation, Athens, Greece (1974)
- Cultural Development: a new political responsibility in Greece, Olkos, Athens, Greece (1987)
- Ideological and Cultural Issues in the Architecture of Modern Greece, Olkos, Athens, Greece (1978)
- Public Architecture in Modern Greece, 1720-1940, Papasotiriou, Athens, Greece (1993)
- Theatre Architecture in Modern Greece, 1720-1940, Athens, Greece, (1994)

sponsored by the European Cultural Centre of Delphi and the I.F. Costopoulos Foundation.

- Why Integrate Educational and Community Facilities?, UNESCO Prospects, 8, 4, 531-34 (1978)
- Helen Fessa-Emmanouil & E.Marmaras, Twelve Greek Architects of the Interwar Period, University Publications of Crete (ISBN 960-7646-74-6)
- Helen Fessa-Emmanouil, Essays on Neohellenic Architecture, (ISBN 960-91597-0-2) (Privately published)
