= Temple Emanuel of Tempe =

Reform Jewish synagogue in Tempe, Arizona, US

- Location in Arizona

Religion
- Affiliation: Reform Judaism
- Ecclesiastical or organizational status: Synagogue
- Leadership: Rabbi Steven Folberg
- Status: Active

Location
- Location: 5801 South Rural Road, Tempe, Arizona 85283
- Country: United States
- Interactive map of Temple Emanuel of Tempe
- Coordinates: 33°22′13″N 111°55′39″W

Architecture
- Type: Synagogue architecture
- Established: 1976 (as a congregation)

Website
- emanueloftempe.org

Temple Emanuel of Tempe is a Reform Jewish congregation and synagogue, located at 5801 South Rural Road, in Tempe, Arizona, in the United States. The congregation was founded in 1976.

As of March 2021, there were 378 membership families. Rabbi Jonathan A. Biatch served as the Interim Rabbi alongside Cantorial Soloist Gregg Luchs until the end of June 2025. Rabbi Steven Folberg became the settled rabbi as of July 2025, also serving alongside Cantorial Soloist Gregg Luchs.
