= Congregation Emanuel (Statesville, North Carolina) =

Jewish synagogue in North Carolina, US

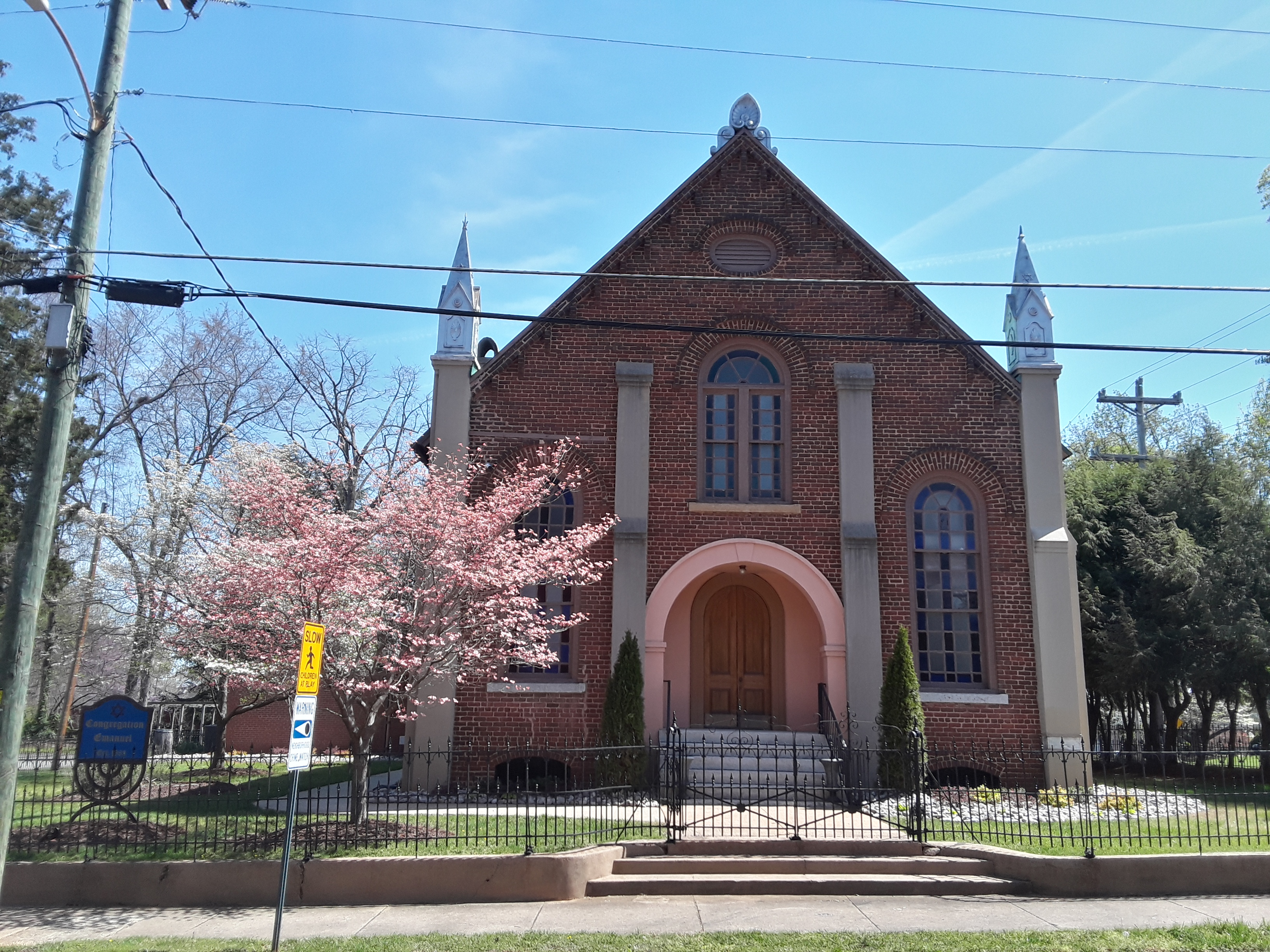
- Synagogue façade in 2022

- Location in North Carolina Congregation Emanuel (Statesville, North Carolina) (the United States)

Religion
- Affiliation: Conservative Judaism
- Ecclesiastical or organizational status: Synagogue
- Leadership: Rabbi: vacant
- Status: Active

Location
- Location: 206 North Kelly Street, Statesville, North Carolina
- Country: United States
- Interactive map of Congregation Emanuel
- Coordinates: 35°47′07″N 80°53′31″W

Architecture
- Type: Synagogue
- Style: Rundbogenstil
- Established: 1883 (as a congregation)
- Completed: 1892

Website
- congregationemanuelnc.com

Congregation Emanuel is a Conservative synagogue at 206 North Kelly Street in Statesville, North Carolina, in the United States. Built in 1891, it is the oldest house of worship in Statesville and the third oldest synagogue building in the state.

The synagogue is located near downtown Statesville and the campus of Mitchell Community College.

== History ==
Jews are documented as living in Statesville before the Civil War, but the number of families was small and they gathered for prayer in private homes until a formal congregation was organized in 1883. Congregation Emanuel rented space for services in the Statesville Fireman's Hall for nine years before building a synagogue in 1891–2, at a time when Statesville had a sizeable Jewish population.

== Architecture ==
The brick, gable-end-to-the-street, Rundbogenstil building with its recessed, round-arch entrance and round-arch windows has suffered no major alterations in the century that it has served the Jewish community of Statesville. It is one of fewer than a hundred nineteenth-century synagogue buildings still standing in the United States.
