= Immanuel Mulunga =

Namibian businessman

- Education: University of Stellenbosch
- Organization: NAMCO

Immanuel Mulunga was the managing director of the National Petroleum Corporation of Namibia (NAMCOR). He was suspended from this job on April 4, 2023, pending investigation into allegations of corruption and improper use of powers. He was cleared of wrongdoing by Namibia's Anti-Corruption Commission in July 2023 but was not restored to his post.

== Early life and education ==
Mulunga was born in Namibia. He holds a Bachelor of Science Degree from the University of Namibia. He then obtained a master's degree in Business Administration (MBA) from the University of Stellenbosch Business School in South Africa.

== Career ==
Mulunga started his career at NAMCOR from 2015 where he served as a managing director of NAMCOR, he served as the Petroleum Commissioner in the Ministry of Mines and Energy. From 2010 to 2015, he was the Ministry of Mines and Energy.
