= Emmanouil Zymvrakakis (Gendarmerie general) =

Greek politician and soldier (1856–1931)

- Native name: Εμμανουήλ Ι. Ζυμβρακάκης
- Born: c. 1856
- Died: c. 1931 (aged 74–75) Kifisia, Second Hellenic Republic
- Allegiance: Kingdom of Greece
- Branch: Hellenic Gendarmerie
- Rank: Lieutenant General
- Commands: Chief of Athens Police
- Other work: Member of Parliament for Athens-Piraeus

Emmanouil Zymvrakakis (Greek: Εμμανουήλ Ι. Ζυμβρακάκης; c. 1856 – c. 1931) was a Cretan officer of the Greek Gendarmerie.

The son of Major General Ioannis Zymvrakakis, he joined the Gendarmerie, advancing through the ranks to Major General. A staunch Venizelist, he served as chief of the Athens police and later as Commanding General of the Gendarmerie before retiring with a promotion to the rank of Lieutenant General in 1921. In the 1923 elections he was elected an MP for Athens-Piraeus.

He died at his home in Kifissia in 1931.
