= Manuelle =

Manuelle is both a given name and a surname. Notable people with the name include:

- Manuelle Daumas (born 1983), French singer-songwriter and performer
- Manuelle Gautrand (born 1961), French architect
- Víctor Manuelle (born 1968), Puerto Rican salsa singer and songwriter

== See also ==
- Manuell
