= Emmanuelle (name) =

- Gender: female
- Language: French

Origin
- Language: France

Other names
- Related names: Emmanuel

Emmanuelle is a feminine given name of French origin. Notable people with the given name include:

- Emmanuelle Antille (born 1972), Swiss video artist
- Emmanuelle Arsan (1932–2005), Thai-French novelist
- Emmanuelle Atienza (2006–2025), Filipino-Taiwanese social media influencer
- Emmanuelle Béart (born 1963), French actress
- Emanuella Carlbeck (1829–1901), Swedish social reformer
- Emmanuelle Charpentier (born 1968), French researcher in microbiology, genetics and biochemistry
- Emmanuelle Chriqui (born 1975), Canadian actress
- Emmanuelle Cinquin (1908–2008), Belgian and French religious sister
- Emmanuelle Claret (1968–2013), French biathlete
- Emmanuelle de Dampierre (1913–2012), member of the Spanish royal family
- Emanuelle Felberk (born 2007), Brazilian rhythmic gymnast
- Emmanuelle Gagliardi (born 1976), Swiss tennis player
- Emmanuelle Grey Rossum (born 1986), known as Emmy Rossum, American actress
- Emmanuelle Khanh (1937–2017), French fashion designer and stylist
- Emmanuelle Lambert (born 1975), French writer
- Emmanuelle Proulx, vocalist and guitarist of the Canadian indie pop band Men I Trust
- Emmanuelle Seigner (born 1966), French actress, former fashion model and lead singer of Ultra Orange & Emmanuelle
- Emmanuelle Vaugier (born 1976), Canadian film and television actress
