= Ivan Hristov (writer) =

Bulgarian writer and poet (born 1978)

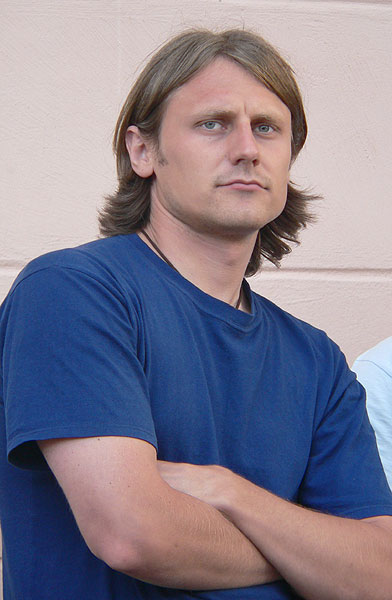
Ivan Hristov

Ivan Hristov or Ivan Christoff (Bulgarian: Иван Христов; born February, 1978 in Borovo, Bulgaria) is a Bulgarian poet, and critic.

His first book of poetry, Sbogom devetnajsti vek (Farewell to the 19th century), was published in 2001 and won the prestigious 2002 Southern Spring award for the best debut book. His second book of poetry, Bdin, was published in 2004 and received critical acclaim, as well as the 2006 Svetlostruj Prize for poetry. He is also the author of the poetry collections Amerikanski poemi (American Poems, 2013), as well as of Luboven recnik (A Dictionary of Love, 2018) which received The Culture is The Refuge of Humanity award at Safi International Forum of Poetry, Morocco 2018. Ivan Hristov's works have been translated into a dozen of languages. In 2015, Bdin was published in Turkish. The next year Bdin followed by American Poems came out in Romania. In 2019, within the framework of the European project Versopolis his third poetry book American Poems was published in Paris, France and his fourth poetry collection A Dictionary of Love, in Bratislava, Slovakia.Ivan has participated in poetry festivals abroad, including Ars Poetica in Bratislava in 2007 and the Goran Spring Festival in Croatia in 2009, where he received first prize in the Poetry Marathon in Hvar. He has participated in the following festivals also: Dasein in Athens, Greece (2010), Sha’ar International Poetry Festival, Tel Aviv, Israel, (2010), The National Festival for Poetic Books, Bucharest, Romania (2011), The Belgrade Festival of Poetry and Books, Belgrade, Serbia (2011), Mediterranean Voices Festival, Lodève, France (2011), Prague Book Fair (2012) among others. He is also a leading literary critic of his generation with numerous academic publications; his book-length research study, The Sagittarius Circle and the Concept of the Native, won the Bulgarian Ministry of Culture's National Culture Fund competition and was published in 2010. Since 2010, Ivan Hristov has been a member of the organizational committee for the international Sofia Poetics festival. He currently works as a researcher at the Institute of Literature of the Bulgarian Academy of Sciences.

== Bibliography ==
BOOKS PUBLISHED IN BULGARIA:

- Farewell to the 19th century (2001) - Sofia: Academic Center for Literature and Culture, 30 pp. (A book of poetry.) Bulgaria
- Bdin (2004) - Plovdiv: Janet 45, 48 pp. (A book of poetry.) Bulgaria
- The Sagittarius Circle and the Concept of the Native (2009) - Sofia: Karina M, 267 pp. (A book-length research study.) Bulgaria
- American poems (2013) - Sofia: Da poetry publishing, 80 pp. (A bilingual book of poetry, in Bulgarian and English.)
- A Dictionary of Love (2018) – Sofia: Versus Publishing, 85 pp.(A book of poetry.) Bulgaria

BOOKS PUBLISHED ABROAD:

- In Turkish – Bdin, The Dump/ Bdin, O Bataklik (2015) – Istanbul: Delta Publishing House, 72 pp. (A book of poetry.) Turkey
- In Bulgarian and Romanian - Bdin, followed by American Poems / Bdin, urmat de Poeme americane (2016) – Bistritza: Max Blecher Publishing House, 205 pp. (A book of poetry.) Romania
- In French, Bulgarian and English – Poems (2019) Paris: La Traductière, 64 pp. (A book of poetry.) France
- In Slovak, Bulgarian and English – Poems (2019) Bratislava: Ars Poetica, 72 pp. (A book of poetry.) Slovakia

== Awards ==
- National Prize for the best poetic debut Southern Spring 2002 for FAREWELL, NINETEENTH CENTURY
- National literary prize Svetlostruy 2006 for BDIN
- First prize in the Poetry Marathon at Goran Spring Festival in Croatia 2009
- The Culture is The Refuge of Humanity award at Safi International Forum of Poetry, Morocco 2018
