= Aegeus (hero) =

Ancient Greek mythological figure

In Greek mythology, Aegeus (Ancient Greek: Αἰγεύς, romanized: Aigeús) is the eponymic hero of the phyle called the Aegeidae at Sparta. He was a son of Oeolycus, and grandson of Theras, the founder of the colony in Thera. All the Aegeïds were believed to be Cadmeans, who formed a settlement at Sparta previous to the Dorian conquest. There is only this difference in the accounts, that, according to some, Aegeus was the leader of the Cadmean colonists at Sparta, while, according to Herodotus, they received their name of Aegeids from the later Aegeus, the son of Oeolycus. There was at Sparta a heroon of Aegeus.
