= Anydros =

Island in Greece

Native name: Άνυδρος
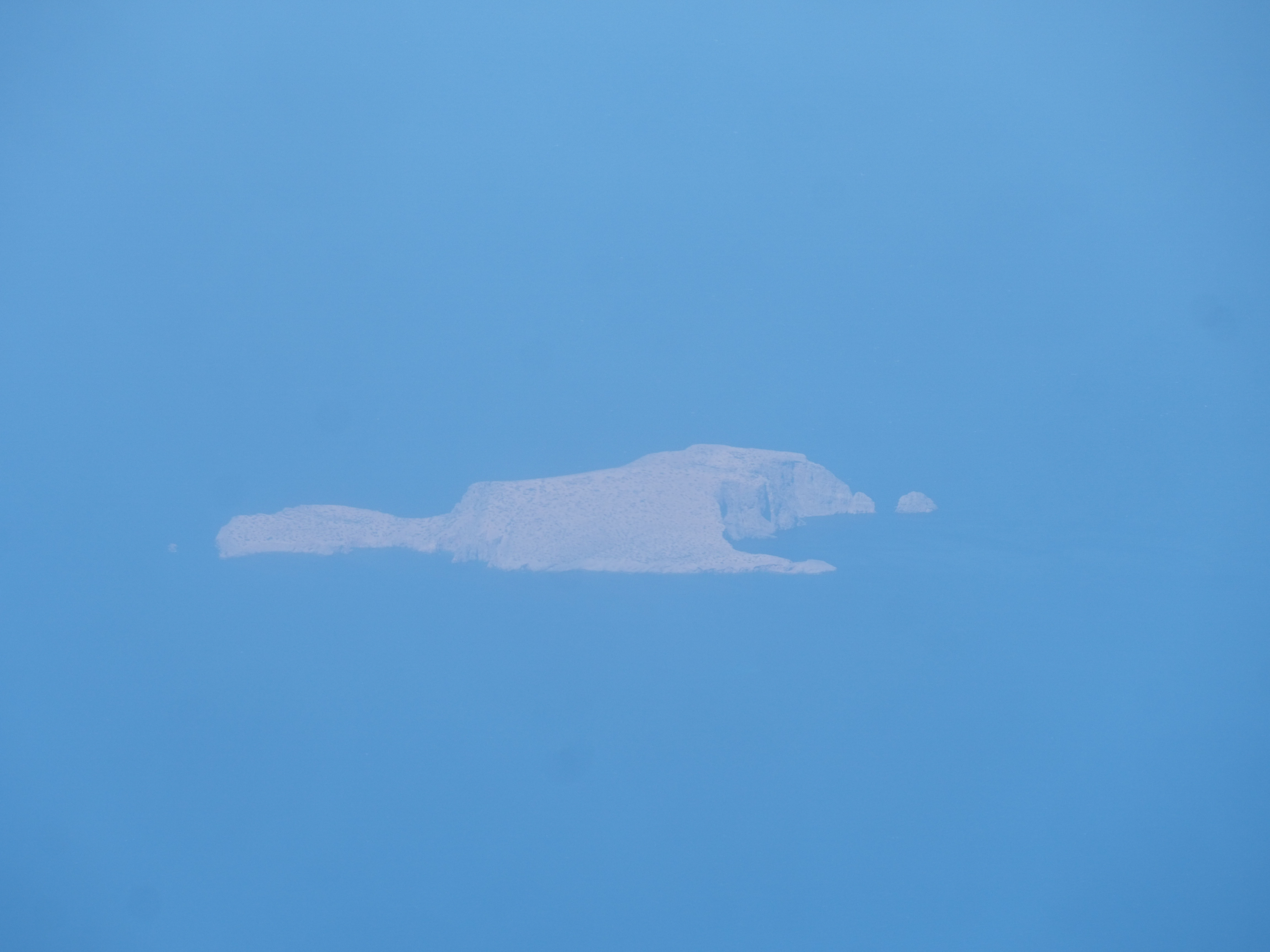
- Aerial view from the southwest
- Interactive map of Anydros

Geography
- Coordinates: 36.625°N 25.685°E
- Archipelago: Cyclades

Administration
- Greece

Anydros (Greek: Άνυδρος) is an uninhabited Greek islet in the municipality of Santorini, which is a group of islands in the Cyclades. It is north of the island Anafi, and southwest of Amorgos. It is sometimes called Greek: Αμοργοπούλα, romanized: Amorgopoúla. The island hosts a seismometer, part of the Greek national network, installed in 2025. An earthquake fault located near Anydros was the source of the 1956 Amorgos earthquake that registered 7.6 on the Richter scale and caused widespread damage on Amorgos and the island of Santorini, where dozens died. A second 7.5 quake and a 30-meter tsunami followed.

There were hundreds of minor earthquakes of up to magnitude 5 in an area around Anydros at the beginning of February 2025, causing concern in Santorini and causing more than half the population to leave the island. The seismic activity was attributed to tectonic plate movements rather than volcanism, and it was thought that it could last weeks.
