= Santorini Cable Car =

Cable car connecting the Old Port to Fira in Santorini, Greece

- Τελεφερίκ Σαντορίνης
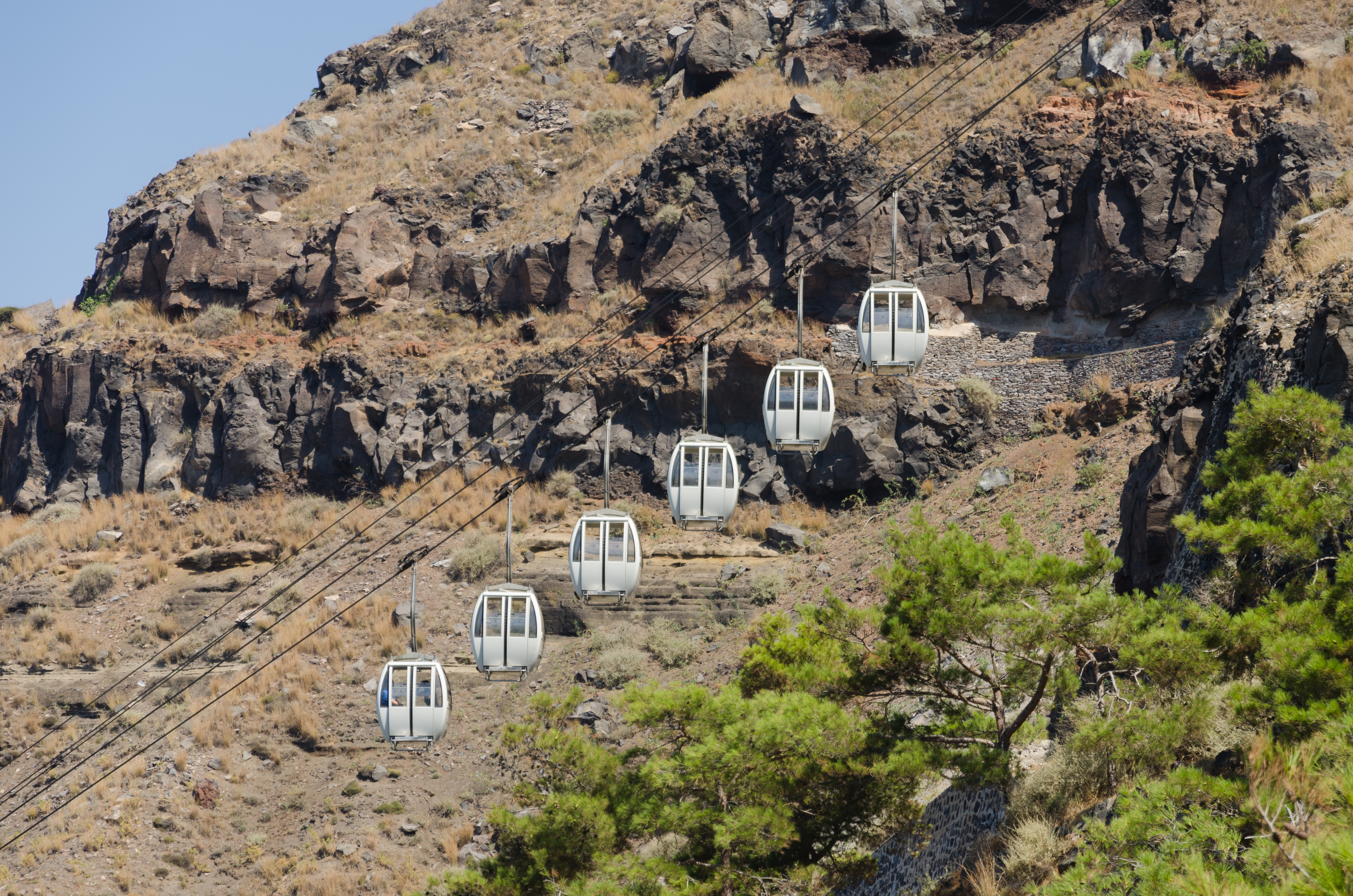
- Interactive map of Santorini Cable Car

Overview
- Status: Operational
- Character: Recreational
- Location: Fira, Santorini
- Country: Greece
- Coordinates: 36°25′13″N 25°25′49″E
- Termini: Old Port (Gialos); Fira
- Elevation: lowest: 0 m highest: 220 m
- No. of stations: 2
- Services: Fira and Old Port
- Built by: Loula and Evangelos Nomikos Foundation
- Construction begin: 1980
- Open: 1982; 44 years ago
- Website: www.scc.gr

Operation
- Owner: Municipality of Thera
- Operator: Municipality of Thera
- Carrier capacity: 6 passengers
- Ridership: 1200 passengers per hour
- Operating times: 07:00–23:00 (summer), varies seasonally
- Headway: Every 20 minutes (summer)
- Trip duration: 3–5 minutes
- Fare: 2025: €10 (one way), €5 (children), €5 (luggage)

Technical features
- Aerial lift type: Pulsed Gondola
- Manufactured by: Doppelmayr
- Notes: Percentage of ticket proceeds supports mule drivers and local development
- Vertical Interval: 220 m

The Santorini Cable Car, locally known as the Teleferico, is a pulsed gondola lift connecting the Old Port of Gialos (Scala Pier) to Fira, the capital of Santorini, Greece. It provides a vital transportation link for cruise ship passengers and locals, offering a quick and scenic ascent up the island’s steep caldera cliffs.

== History ==
The cable car was funded and constructed through a donation from the Loula & Evangelos Nomikos Foundation, initiated by shipowner Evangelos Nomikos in 1979. Construction began in 1980 and was completed in 1982. It was built to address the challenges of the traditional ascent methods—climbing approximately 600 steep steps or riding mules—which were physically demanding. The cable car is owned by the Municipality of Thera, with ticket revenue shared among Santorini’s 14 communities and partly allocated to support traditional mule drivers.

== Technical Details ==
Built by Doppelmayr, the cable car adheres to Austrian safety standards. It has a capacity of 1,200 passengers per hour (600 per direction), with each gondola carrying six passengers in two rows of three. The journey covers a vertical ascent of approximately 220 meters (722 feet) and takes 3–5 minutes. The ride offers panoramic views of the Aegean Sea, the Santorini Caldera, the volcano, and Fira’s white-washed architecture.

== Accessibility ==
The cable car is designed to accommodate passengers with mobility challenges, including wheelchair users. Wheelchairs must have a maximum width of 58 cm and a maximum length of 120 cm to fit within the gondolas. Advance coordination with the operator is recommended to ensure smooth access. The cable car may not be suitable for strollers or pets.

== Significance and Impact ==
The cable car enables visitors arriving by ship to ascend the cliffs easily, enhancing Santorini’s tourism economy. It provides an alternative to the strenuous 600-step climb or mule rides, which have raised ethical concerns due to animal welfare. Ticket revenue supports local community projects and preserves the cultural tradition of mule transport.

== Visitor Information ==
The Fira station is near the Archaeological Museum, with signage from the Orthodox Metropolitan Cathedral. The Old Port station serves cruise passengers tendered to Scala Pier. Visitors should ride early or late to avoid crowds. Alternatives include walking the steps (1–1.5 hours) or hiring mules, though the latter is less recommended.
