= The Parting of the Sea =

2009 book by Barbara J. Sivertsen

The Parting of the Sea: How Volcanoes, Earthquakes, and Plagues Shaped the Exodus Story
- Author: Barbara J. Sivertsen
- Language: English
- Subject: Biblical history, Exodus
- Publication date: 2009
- Publication place: United States

The Parting of the Sea: How Volcanoes, Earthquakes, and Plagues Shaped the Exodus Story is a book written by Barbara J. Sivertsen in 2009.

The book accepts the biblical story as factual and supports an early Exodus hypothesis, prior to a biblical date posited as ca. 1440 BCE. According to the author, "The Exodus was in fact two separate exoduses. The first exodus followed a 1628 BCE Minoan eruption that produced all but one of the first nine plagues. The second exodus followed an eruption of a volcano off the Aegean island of Yali almost two centuries later, creating the tenth plague of darkness and a series of tsunamis that … drowned [Tuthmose III and] the pursuing Egyptian army."

Sivertsen's account would fit chronologically with the conquest of Jericho and suggests that the Israelites were in Canaan before the end of the sixteenth century BCE. Per this view, the first exodus occurred ca. 1628 BCE. As a result, it is possible that the Israelites were indeed at Jericho when City IV was destroyed ca. 1550 BCE. Also, according to this view, the Israelites and the Hyksos are separate groups of people, and the first Exodus from Egypt occurred before the expulsion of the Hyksos. As a result, this interpretation of the exodus does not suffer from the difficulties that come from identifying the Israelites with the Hyksos rulers of Egypt. This book advocates the high Egyptian chronology which dates the reign of Thutmose III to the time period from 1504 BCE to 1450 BCE rather than the time period from 1479 BCE to 1425 BCE that it occupies in the conventional Egyptian chronology. Sivertsen also argues that the mummy from the Deir el-Bahri cache in the Valley of the Kings that was labeled as Thutmose III is actually the mummy of a different person. As a result, it is possible that the second exodus occurred in 1450 BCE (which is close to the traditional early date of 1447 BCE) and it is also possible that the reign of Thutmose III ended at the time of this exodus.

== Reviews ==
A review in the Library Journal concluded "Intriguing ideas recommend this well-written, well-researched work to those who enjoy biblical studies through the lens of science, although some may wonder if subsequent scholarship will support the author's somewhat expansive claims".

Mark Harris writes that her book "shows inconsistency in reading the text literally when a suitable naturalistic hypothesis presents itself, but loosely at other times, sometimes in order to incorporate a naturalistic hypothesis. However, in its favor, Sivertsen offers a memorable and imaginative reading which, because of its heavy use of naturalistic and catastrophic components, possesses many qualities of the traditional apocalypse; in such a way, modern science recreates the ancient genre."
