= Raid on Santorini =

1944 battle of World War II

- Part of the Battle of the Mediterranean of World War II
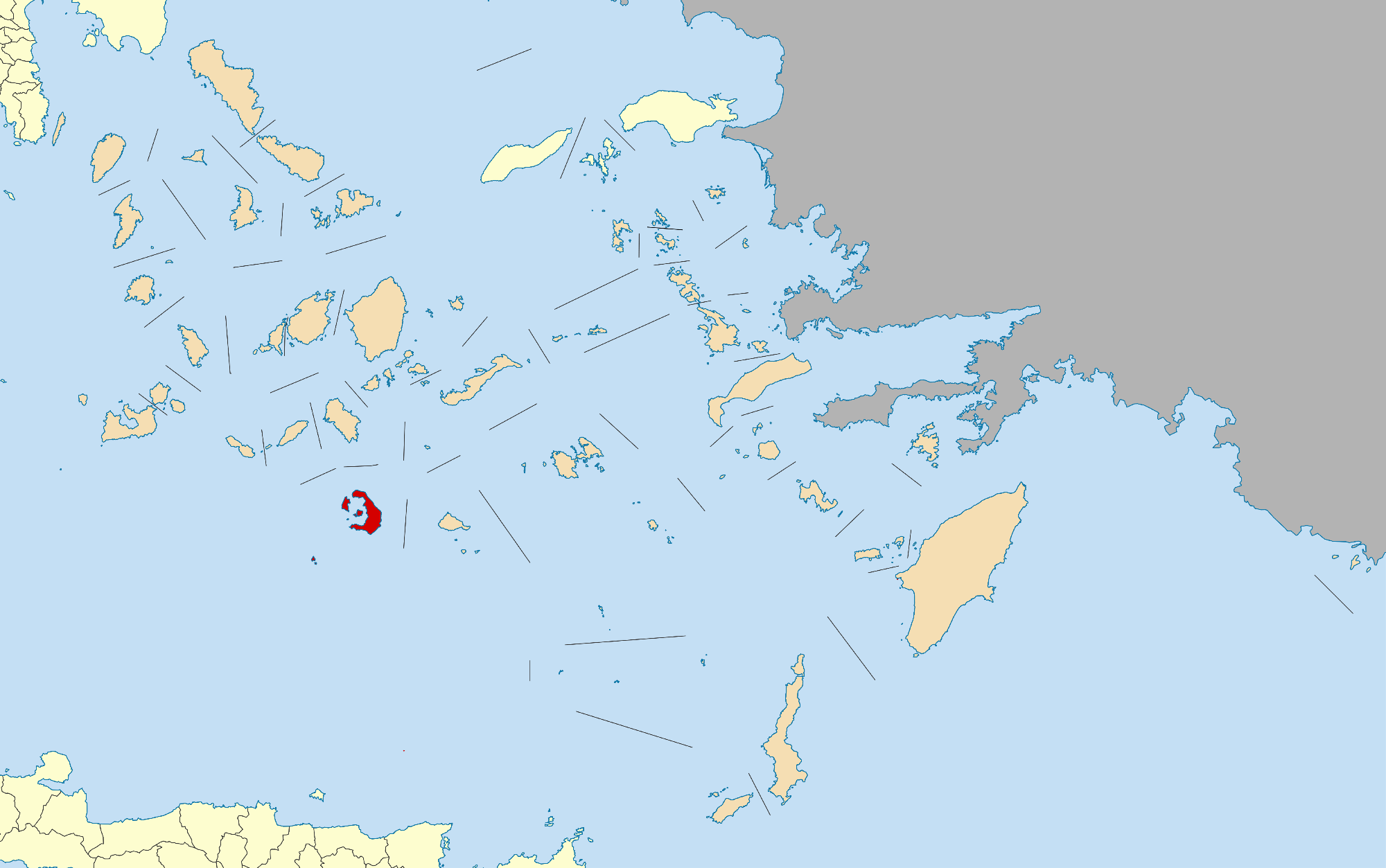
- Location of Santorini in the Aegean
Date	24 April 1944
Location	Santorini, Aegean islands 36°25′12″N 25°25′54″E
Result	Allied victory

Belligerents
United Kingdom; Greece	Germany; Italian Social Republic

Commanders and leaders
(United Kingdom) Anders Lassen; (Kingdom of Greece) Stefanos Kazoulis †	(Nazi Germany) Lieutenant Hesse

Strength
Special Boat Service 19 Commandos	Garrison company

Casualties and losses
2 killed	40 killed or wounded; 19 captured
- 5 civilians executed; 13 civilians killed in Commando explosion

The Raid on Santorini took place on 24 April 1944 as part of the Mediterranean Campaign in World War II. It was conducted by the British Special Boat Service, against the joint German and Italian garrison on the island of Santorini (Thera) in the Aegean Sea. The raid was made in tandem with similar operations at the islands of Ios, Mykonos and Amorgos that aimed to destroy Axis naval observation posts and radio stations on the Cycladic islands.

== Background ==
During the winter of 1943, the Germans had secured their control of the Aegean archipelago and in the spring 1944, they still maintained appreciable garrisons on them. The British wished to maintain a secondary front in the Aegean and after the fall of Kos and Leros, the Middle East HQ issued orders to the Special Boat Service (SBS) to attack the garrisons of occupied Greek islands such as Santorini.

== The raid ==
On April 19, a group of 19 commandos under Major Anders Lassen sailed from their hideout in Balisu bay, Turkey aboard two schooners. After a three-day voyage that included intermediate stops in Syrna and Anydros, the group landed on an easterly beach near Cape Columbo on the night of 22/23 April. They marched towards the village of Vourvoulos and after contacting the locals, hid in a nearby cave. The two schooners sought shelter in the nearby Christiana islands, south-west of Santorini. One member of the group of commandos was the Greek Lieutenant Stefanos Kazoulis (Greek: Στέφανος Καζούλλης). On April 23, Kazoulis was guided by locals to the capital, Fira, to gather intelligence. Based on Kazoulis' information, Lassen decided to divide his forces into three detachments. The first would attack the barracks in Fira, the second would head to the residence of the German commanding officer (Lieutenant Hesse) in Fira and attempt to capture him while the third would target the radio station in Imerovigli. This radio had a long range and served as a relay supporting communications between Athens and Crete.

Zero hour for the attack was set to 00:45 of April 24 and the three detachments were led to their targets by local guides. The barracks were located in the centre of Fira, on the second floor of a building that housed a bank. The attackers came from two directions and in spite of barking dogs, they managed to surprise the 40-strong garrison and kill most of them. During the attack, Kazoulis was shot in the chest and died immediately. Sergeant Frank Kingston was also shot in the abdomen and succumbed to his wounds a few hours later. The attack against the German commanding officer failed and he and a few others managed to flee unscathed. The building housing the radio installation was blown up with time bombs. The commandos escaped using their two schooners, taking with them some of the locals who had helped them.

== Reprisals ==
On April 29, German reinforcements from the island of Milos surrounded Vourvoulos. They arrested all local men aged 14 and older and threatened them with reprisals if they did not reveal those who helped the commandos. A few villagers admitted their involvement and were sent to the firing squad. Five men, among them the village mayor, were executed. It is unclear why the rest of the villagers and the village itself were spared. It has been claimed that this was the result of a letter written to Lt Hesse by Lassen, warning him that his name was known to the Allies who would hold him accountable for any reprisals he ordered. A monument commemorating the victims has been erected in Vourvoulos.

== Aftermath ==
Two commandos died in the operation and five civilians were shot in reprisal. Another 13 civilians from Imerovigli trying to loot German provisions in the radio building died when the demolition charges went off. The number of German casualties was around 40 and 19 were taken prisoner. Due to its violence, the operation became known as Lassen's Bloodbath. This and similar operations forced General Ulrich Kleemann to instruct his troops that "[they were] living in an enemy country" and to reinforce the Aegean garrisons with 4,000 men. These forces remained tied down in place for the rest of the war, depriving other fronts of their services. In August 1944, Kazoulis was posthumously awarded the Greek Cross of Valour. Sergeant Frank Kingston is buried at the Phaleron War Cemetery near Athens.

== See also ==
- Raid on Symi
