= List of shipwrecks in January 1871 =

The list of shipwrecks in January 1871 includes ships sunk, foundered, grounded, or otherwise lost during January 1871.

== 1 January ==
List of shipwrecks: 1 January 1871
Ship	State	Description
Adrien	France	The schooner was driven ashore in a cyclone at Saint-Pierre, Réunion.
Argonaute	France	The ship was damagedin a cyclone at Réunion.
Auffredy	France	The ship was damaged in a cyclone at Réunion.
Avenger	United Kingdom	The steamship sank in the River Tyne.
Caledonia	United Kingdom	The smack was driven ashore at Lamlash, Isle of Arran. She was on a voyage from Belfast, County Antrim to Port Dundas, Renfrewshire.
Ceara	France	The brig was holed by ice and sank at Pauillac, Gironde. Her crew were rescued.
Corommandel	United Kingdom	The ship was driven ashore and wrecked at Poorhead, County Cork. Her seven crew were rescued by the Coastguard using rocket apparatus. She was on a voyage from Philadelphia, Pennsylvania, United States to Liverpool, Lancashire.
Czanan	France	The ship was driven ashore and severely damaged in a cyclone at Réunion.
Dean, Grand Era, John Howard, Julia Rudolph, Magenta, and Thompson	United States	The steamboats were destroyed by fire at New Orleans, Louisiana.
Elizabeth	United Kingdom	The ship was driven ashore and wrecked at Amble, Northumberland. She was on a voyage from South Shields, County Durham to Perth.
Etienne	France	The ship was damaged in a cyclone at Réunion.
Laurence	France	The ship was damaged in a cyclone at Réunion.
Maid of Foyers	United Kingdom	The schooner was driven ashore at Boulmer, Northumberland. Her crew were reached shore in their boat. Maid of Foyers was on a voyage from Loch Ness to Sunderland, County Durham. She was refloated on 7 January but capsized and was towed in to Amble.
Mierendorff Wardow	Rostock	The brig was severely damaged by fire at West Hartlepool, County Durham, United Kingdom.
Miss Douglas	United Kingdom	The schooner was wrecked 3 nautical miles (5.6 km) west of Drigg, Cumberland with the loss of three of her four crew. She was on a voyage from Port Dinorwic, Caernarfonshire to Silloth, Cumberland.
Misti	France	The ship was damaged in a cyclone at Réunion.
Morning Star	United Kingdom	The brig was driven ashore and wrecked on Horse Isle, in the Firth of Clyde. Her crew of 6 were rescued by the Ardrossan Lifeboat Fair Maid of Perth ( Royal National Lifeboat Institution). She was on a voyage from Dublin to Ardrossan, Ayrshire.
Nizam	France	The ship was damaged in a cyclone at Réunion.
Oxalis	United Kingdom	The schooner was driven ashore at Boulmer. Her four crew were rescued by the Boulmer Lifeboat Robin Hood of Nottingham ( Royal National Lifeboat Institution). Oxalis was on a voyage from Sunderland to Portsoy, Aberdeenshire. She subsequently sank.
Thomas and Joseph	United Kingdom	The ship was driven ashore at Caister-on-Sea, Norfolk.
Torninto	United Kingdom	The ship was driven ashore and wrecked at Queenstown, County Cork.
Undaunted	United Kingdom	The smack was driven ashore by ice at Brough Yorkshire. She was refloated the next day and towed by the tug James Watt (United Kingdom) to Hull, Yorkshire, where she sank.
Uranie	France	The schooner was driven ashore in a cyclone at Réunion. Her crew were rescued. She subsequently drove out to sea.
Five unnamed vessels	Flags unknown	The ships were driven ashore and wrecked at Marathon, Greece.

== 2 January ==
List of shipwrecks: 2 January 1871
Ship	State	Description
Cockaleekie	United Kingdom	The schooner was driven ashore at Campbeltown, Argyllshire.
Coila	United Kingdom	The ship was beached in the River Lagan. She was on a voyage from Liverpool, Lancashire to the West Indies. She was refloated and towed in to Belfast, County Antrim.
Colima	United Kingdom	The barque sank at Dundrum, County Down. Her crew were rescued. She was on a voyage from Liverpool to Libertad, Central America and/or Amapala, British Honduras.
Daniel O'Connell	United Kingdom	The schooner was driven ashore at East Tarbert, Ayrshire. Her crew were rescued. She was on a voyage from Liverpool to Donaghadee, County Down.
Fanny Gurrich	United Kingdom	The ship was sighted in the Mediterranean Sea whilst on a voyage from Berdyanski, Russia to a British port. No further trace, presumed foundered with the loss of all hands.
Rosa Grey	United Kingdom	The ship was driven ashore and wrecked at St. Stephen's Point, in the Sea of Marmara. She was on a voyage from Sulina, Ottoman Empire to a British port.
Viola	United Kingdom	The ship was wrecked on the Longsand, in the North Sea off the coast of Essex. Her nine crew were rescued. She was on a voyage from "St. Davids" to Matanzas, Cuba.
Unnamed	Flag unknown	The ship collided with Accra (United Kingdom) and foundered off Holyhead, Anglesey, United Kingdom.

== 3 January ==
List of shipwrecks: 3 January 1871
Ship	State	Description
Britannia	Prussia	The barque was driven onto the Schultz Ground, in the Kattegat, by ice and was abandoned by her crew. She was on a voyage from an English port to Stettin. She sank off Anholt, Denmark before 10 January.
Britannia	United Kingdom	The ship was destroyed by fire in the Atlantic Ocean (41°50′N 66°40′W). Her crew survived. She was on a voyage from London to Boston, Massachusetts, United States.
Dunedin	United Kingdom	The ship ran aground in the Clyde. She was refloated the next day.
Fleetwood	United Kingdom	The steamship ran aground at Belfast, County Antrim. She was refloated and resumed her voyage.
Flying Childers	United Kingdom	The tug collided with the steamship Llama (United Kingdom) and sank in the Clyde. Her crew were rescued.
H. J. Burton	United States	The ship ran aground at Bilbao, Spain. She was on a voyage from New York to Bilbao.
Margaret Ann	United Kingdom	The yawl struck the Breast Rock, off Girvan, Ayrshire, caught fire and sank. She was on a voyage from Larne, County Antrim to the Clyde. She was refloated in late May and placed under repair.
Pawnee	United Kingdom	The barque was driven ashore at Galveston, Texas, United States. She was on a voyage from Galveston to Liverpool. She was consequently condemned.
Rebecca	United Kingdom	The ship struck rocks off Aspronisi, Greece and sank. She was on a voyage from Swansea, Glamorgan to Syros, Greece.
Runnymede	United Kingdom	The ship was damaged by fire at Hobart, Tasmania. The fire was extinguished by the Hobart City Fire Brigade with assistance from HMS Blanche (Royal Navy).
Undaunted	United Kingdom	The fishing smack was holed by ice and sank at Hull, Yorkshire.
Veranda	Norway	The ship ran aground at Bilban and was severely damaged. She was on a voyage from Sundsvall to Bilbao.
Victoria	Norway	The barque was abandoned off the coast of Caithness, United Kingdom. Her crew were rescued by the brig Queen Elizabeth (Prussia). Victoria was on a voyage from Sundsvall to Fleetwood, Lancashire, United Kingdom. She was taken in to Manssund, Norway in June.

== 4 January ==
List of shipwrecks: 4 January 1871
Ship	State	Description
Bilboa	United Kingdom	The brig was driven ashore at Flamborough Head, Yorkshire. She was on a voyage from London to Seaham, County Durham. She was refloated and taken in to Seaham in a leaky condition.
Catherine Morrison	United Kingdom	The barque was driven ashore and wrecked on the Rhins of Galloway, Wigtownshire with the loss of all eleven crew. She was on a voyage from Ardrossan, Ayrshire to Constantinople, Ottoman Empire.
Crusader	United Kingdom	The steamship was lost at Cartagena, Spain. She was on a voyage from Liverpool to Colón, United States of Colombia.
Harry Helbert	United Kingdom	The brigantine ran aground on the Wolf Rock, Cornwall. She was on a voyage from Newport, Monmouthshire to Ardrossan. She was refloated and resumed her voyage.
Max	France	Franco-Prussian War: The transport ship was captured off the mouth of the Gironde by SMS Augusta (Prussian Navy) and was burnt.
New Dominion	United Kingdom	The barque was wrecked in Dunraven Bay. She was on a voyage from Prince Edward Island, Canada to Cardiff, Glamorgan.
Paquita	Spain	The barque ran aground on the Doggerbank, in the Irish Sea off the coast of County Wexford, United Kingdom. Her sixteen crew were rescued by the Wexford Lifeboat Civil Service ( Royal National Lifeboat Institution). Paquita was on a voyage from Santander to Liverpool, Lancashire, United Kingdom. She was later refloated with the assistance of Civil Service and a tug and taken in to Wexford.
Sir William Wallace	United Kingdom	The schooner was wrecked at "Burnford", Kirkcudbrightshire. Her crew were rescued. She was on a voyage from Dunkeld, Ontario, Canada to Liverpool.

== 5 January ==
List of shipwrecks: 5 January 1871
Ship	State	Description
Cincetti Zarlo	Italy	The barque was damaged by fire at South Shields, County Durham, United Kingdom.
Immacolata	Flag unknown	The ship ran aground and capsized at Queenstown, County Cork, United Kingdom. She was on a voyage from Odesa, Russian to Queenstonw. She was refloated.
Kirtons	United Kingdom	The brig was wrecked on the Filey Brigg. Her six crew were rescued by the fishing yawl Refuge (United Kingdom). Kirtons was on a voyage from Sunderland, County Durham to Shoreham-by-Sea, Sussex.
Lark	United Kingdom	The fishing boat ran aground on the Dogger Bank, in the Irish Sea off the coast of County Wexford and capsized. Both crew were rescued by the Wexford Lifeboat Civil Service ( Royal National Lifeboat Institution).
Laura Maria	United Kingdom	The ship was driven ashore at "Tinicum Island", Pennsylvania, United States. She was on a voyage from Liverpool, Lancashire to Philadelphia, Pennsylvania.
Margaret and Ann, or Margaret and Jamie	United Kingdom	The ship ran aground at Pettycur, Fife. She was on a voyage from Newcastle upon Tyne, Northumberland to Pettycur.
Merchant	United Kingdom	The brig was driven ashore at Saltfleet, Lincolnshire. She was on a voyage from Great Yarmouth, Norfolk to Newcastle upon Tyne, Northumberland.
Miron	(France) Saint Martin	The schooner was driven ashore and severely damaged on Bermuda. She was on a voyage from Saint Domingo to New York, United States.
Peggy	United Kingdom	The schooner was driven ashore and wrecked at Ross Point. Her crew were rescued.
S. D. Thurston	United States	The ship was wrecked on the Nash Sands, in the Bristol Channel off the coast of Glamorgan, United Kingdom. Her crew were rescued. She was on a voyage from New York to Bristol, Gloucestershire, United Kingdom.
Unnamed	United Kingdom	The steamship sank 5 nautical miles (9.3 km) west of Nash Point, Glamorgan.
Unnamed	Spain	The barque was wrecked on the coast of Brazil.

== 6 January ==
List of shipwrecks: 6 January 1871
Ship	State	Description
Elwin Hawthorn	United Kingdom	The ship ran aground and sank at Knokke, West Flanders, Belgium. Her crew were rescued. She was on a voyage from London to Ghent, East Flanders, Belgium. She was later refloated and taken in to Blankenberge, West Flanders.
General Havelock	United Kingdom	The ship collided with Euphemia (United Kingdom) and sank off Flamborough Head, Yorkshire.
James B. Duffus	United States	The ship ran aground on the Paedermarkt. Her crew were rescued. She was on a voyage from New York to Antwerp, Belgium. She was later refloated and towed in to Vlissingen, Zeeland, Netherlands.
Jessie Forrest	United Kingdom	The barque was run ashore at Ouessant, Finistère, France and abandoned by her crew. She was on a voyage from Africa to Liverpool, Lancashire. She was subsequently taken in tow for Weymouth, Dorset by a steamship, which then took her in to Brest, Finistère.
Speed	United Kingdom	The schooner ran aground on the Barnard Sand, in the North Sea off the coast of Norfolk. She was on a voyage from Newcastle upon Tyne, Northumberland to Rochefort, Charente-Inférieure, France. She was refloated the next day and taken in to Great Yarmouth, Norfolk in a leaky condition.
Thames	United Kingdom	The steamship ran aground on the Collie Rocks. She was on a voyage from Dunbar, Lothian to Culloden, Inverness-shire. She was refloated and taken in to Macduff, Aberdeenshire for repairs.

== 7 January ==
List of shipwrecks: 7 January 1871
Ship	State	Description
Belle	United Kingdom	The schooner was driven ashore in the River Thames near Gravesend, Kent. She was on a voyage from São Miguel Island, Azores to London.
Belmont	United Kingdom	The steamship was driven out to sea from Sunderland, County Durham by ice.
Camilla	United Kingdom	The ship was driven out to sea from Sunderland by ice.
Cognac Packet	United Kingdom	The ship was driven out to sea from Sunderland by ice and was severely damaged.
Corsair	United Kingdom	The ship was driven from her moorings by ice and ran aground at Sunderland.
Dart	United Kingdom	The ship was driven from her moorings by ice and ran aground at Sunderland. She was severely damaged.
Draco	Austria-Hungary	The barque ran aground on the Brake Sand and was abandoned by her crew. She was on a voyage from Odesa, Russia to London.
Escort	United Kingdom	The ship was driven from her moorings by ice and ran aground at Sunderland. She was severely damaged.
Fancy	United Kingdom	The ship was driven out to sea from Sunderland by ice. She was severely damaged.
Forsoget	Denmark	The ship was driven ashore and wrecked at "Wingo". She was on a voyage from Hartlepool, County Durham to Helsingør.
Fuzil Currin	(United Kingdom of Great Britain and Ireland) Straits Settlements	The barque sank 40 nautical miles (74 km) south east of "Mooloopully". Her crew were rescued. She was on a voyage from Masulipatam to Madras, India.
Jane	United Kingdom	The ship was driven out to sea from Sunderland by ice.
Jean	United Kingdom	The ship was driven out to sea from Sunderland by ice.
Joseph Fish	United States	The full-rigged ship ran aground on the Goodwin Sands, Kent, United Kingdom. She was on a voyage from New York to London. She was refloated with assistance from the Ramsgate Lifeboat and two tugs, including Middlesex (United Kingdom) and taken in tow for London.
Maria Emilie	United Kingdom	The lugger was driven out to sea from Sunderland by ice.
Mary Ann	United Kingdom	The ship was driven out to sea from Sunderland by ice. She was severely damaged.
Myrtle	United Kingdom	The ship was driven from her moorings by ice and ran aground at Sunderland. She was severely damaged.
Ocean Queen	United Kingdom	The ship ran aground on the Goodwin Sands. She was refloated with the assistance of the tug Restless (United Kingdom) and taken in to Ramsgate, Kent.
Pearl	United Kingdom	The ship was driven from her moorings by ice and ran aground at Sunderland.
Sea	United Kingdom	The barque ran aground on the Goodwin Sands Her crew were rescued by the Ramsgate Lifeboat. She was on a voyage from Hartlepool to Cuba. She was refloated and assisted in to Ramsgate by a tug.
Sori	Italy	The brig ran aground on the Goodwin Sands and was abandoned by her crew, who were presumed to have subsequently perished. She was on a voyage from Feodosia, Russia to Hull, Yorkshire, United Kingdom. She was refloated with assistance from the Deal and Ramsgate Lifeboats and towed in to Ramsgate.
Vine	United Kingdom	The ship was driven out to sea from Sunderland by ice. She was severely damaged.
Unnamed	United Kingdom	The steamship ran aground on the Goodwin Sands and was abandoned by her crew, who got aboard the Gull Lightship ( Trinity House). She was later reboarded by her crew and assisted in to Ramsgate by a tug.
Unnamed	Flag unknown	The barque ran aground on the Brake Sand. She was refloated with assistance.
Five unnamed vessels	United Kingdom	Four barques and a schooner was driven out to sea from Sunderland by ice.

== 8 January ==
List of shipwrecks: 8 January 1871
Ship	State	Description
Minerva	United Kingdom	The ship was driven ashore at Licata, Sicily, Italy. She was on a voyage from Newcastle upon Tyne, Northumberland to Licata.

== 9 January ==
List of shipwrecks: 9 January 1871
Ship	State	Description
Edith Wonson	United States	The fishing schooner sank on the Western Banks in a gale. Lost with all 12 crew.
Magnolia	United States	The schooner was wrecked off Cape Charles, Virginia. Her crew were rescued. She was on a voyage from Philadelphia, Pennsylvania to Norfolk, Virginia.
Zoe	Italy	The brig was wrecked on the Goodwin Sands, Kent, United Kingdom. Two crew were rescued by Prince (United Kingdom).
Volunteer	United States	The barque was abandoned in the Atlantic Ocean off Race Point, Massachusetts. Her crew were rescued. Volunteer was on a voyage from Málaga, Spain to Boston, Massachusetts. She was subsequently towed in to Provincetown, Massachusetts in a derelict condition.

== 10 January ==
List of shipwrecks: 10 January 1871
Ship	State	Description
Callie Allie	United Kingdom	The ship foundered in the Atlantic Ocean. Her crew were rescued. She was on a voyage from Rosario, Argentina to Liverpool, Lancashire.
Devonshire Lass	United Kingdom	The ship ran aground on the Foreness Rock, Margate, Kent. She was on a voyage from Newcastle upon Tyne, Northumberland to Exeter, Devon. She was refloated with assistance.
Handy	United Kingdom	The schooner ran aground on the Blackwater Bank, in the Irish Sea. Her five crew were rescued by the Cahore Lifeboat Sir George Bowles ( Royal National Lifeboat Institution). She was on a voyage from Ayr to Wexford. She was refloated and beached at Cahore, County Wexford.
Inkerman	United Kingdom	The full-rigged ship was driven ashore at Moulmein, Burma. She was refloated on 14 January.
Navarre	France	The steamship was holed by ice and sank at the stern at Bordeaux, Gironde. She was placed under repair.
Sarah N. Smith	United Kingdom	The barque ran aground on the Shovelful Shoals. She was on a voyage from Liverpool to Boston, Massachusetts, United States.
HMS Valourous	Royal Navy	The Magicienne-class frigate was driven from her moorings and ran aground at Plymouth, Devon.

== 11 January ==
List of shipwrecks: 11 January 1871
Ship	State	Description
Calliope	Greece	The brig ran aground and sank at Liverpool, Lancashire, United Kingdom. Her crew were rescued by the brig Royal Arch (United Kingdom). Calliope was on a voyage from Liverpool to Syra.
Cherokee	United Kingdom	The full-rigged ship foundered in the Bay of Biscay. Her 28 crew took to the boats; they were rescued two days later by the schooner Julia (United Kingdom). Cherokee was on a voyage from Liverpool to Bombay, India.
Crescent	United Kingdom	The barque ran aground at Liverpool. All seventeen people on board survived. She was on a voyage from Liverpool to Havana, Cuba.
Dartmouth	United Kingdom	The schooner struck a sunken wreck off Porthcurno, Cornwall and sank. Her crew were rescued She was on a voyage from Cardiff, Glamorgan to Penzance, Cornwall.
Douro	Netherlands	The galiot ran aground on the Goodwin Sands, Kent, United Kingdom. She was refloated and beached at Deal, Kent. She was subsequently taken in to Ramsgate, Kent.
Dunbar Castle	United Kingdom	The ship ran aground at Ryde, Isle of Wight and was scuttled. She was on a voyage from Hartlepool, County Durham to Ryde.
Express	United Kingdom	The barque was wrecked at Castellamare del Golfo, Sicily, Kingdom of Italy with the loss of her captain. She was on a voyage from the Black Sea to an English port.
Harmony	United Kingdom	The schooner was driven ashore on Lady Isle, in the Firth of Clyde. She was refloated and taken in to Troon, Ayrshire.
Royal Standard	United Kingdom	The ship was driven ashore and wrecked in the Isles of Scilly. Her crew were rescued. She was on a voyage from Kinsale, County Cork to Southampton, Hampshire. She was refloated on 15 January.
Unico	Italy	The ship was wrecked on Filey Brigg with the loss of all but one of her thirteen crew. She was on a voyage from Newcastle upon Tyne, Northumberland, United Kingdom to Genoa.
Unnamed	France	The ship was driven ashore and wrecked south of Royan, Charente-Inférieure.

== 12 January ==
List of shipwrecks: 12 January 1871
Ship	State	Description
Betty	United Kingdom	The barque was driven ashore on Anholt, Denmark. She was on a voyage from Burntisland, Fife to Copenhagen, Denmark. She was refloated on 16 January and towed in to Helsingør, Denmark in a leaky condition.
Earl Russell	United Kingdom	The ship was sighted in the Atlantic Ocean (42°31′N 26°00′W) whilst on a voyage from Batavia, Netherlands East Indies to Rotterdam, South Holland, Netherlands. No further trace, presumed foundered with the loss of all hands.

== 14 January ==
List of shipwrecks: 14 January 1871
Ship	State	Description
Gazelle	United Kingdom	The brig was driven ashore at Faro, Portugal. She was on a voyage from Burntisland, Fife to Lisbon and Faro. She was refloated.
Julianne Pauline	Danzig	The ship was driven ashore at Løkken-Vrå, Denmark with the loss of three of her crew. She was on a voyage from Grangemouth, Stirlingshire, United Kingdom to Danzig.
Leocadia	France	The brig ran aground on the Pennington Spit, off the coast of Hampshire, United Kingdom. She was on a voyage from Dunkirk, Nord to Marseille, Bouches-du-Rhône.
Margaret McDonald	United Kingdom	The brig was driven ashore at Saltfleet, Lincolnshire. She was on a voyage from Sunderland, County Durham to London.
Thetis	United Kingdom	The steamship ran aground in the Elbe. She was on a voyage from Newcastle upon Tyne, Northumberland to Hamburg.
T. L. McGill	United States	The steamboat ran aground in the Mississippi River downstream of Memphis, Tennessee. She was on a voyage from Saint Louis, Missouri to New Orleans, Louisiana. She was destroyed by fire on 16 January with the loss of 58 lives.
Tom Henry	United Kingdom	The ship ran aground at Kirkwall, Orkney Islands. She was on a voyage from Alloa, Clackmannanshire to Kirkwall. She was refloated on 16 January and taken in to Kirkwall.
Tornado	United Kingdom	The ship ran aground on the Shipwash Sand, in the North Sea of the coast of Suffolk. She was on a voyage from Callao, Peru to Hull, Yorkshire. She was refloated and resumed her voyage.

== 15 January ==
List of shipwrecks: 15 January 1871
Ship	State	Description
Cleopatra	United Kingdom	The barque sprang a leak and sank at Saint-Marc, Haiti. Her crew were rescued.
Cornhill	United Kingdom	The brigantine was driven ashore at Dungarvan, County Antrim. Her three crew were rescued by the Dungarvan Lifeboat Christopher Ludlow ( Royal National Lifeboat Institution).
Edward Boustead	United Kingdom	The ship was abandoned in the North Sea. Her crew were rescued. She was on a voyage from Grimsby, Lincolnshire to Barcelona, Spain.
Eliza	United Kingdom	The schooner was wrecked 2 nautical miles (3.7 km) south of Garlieston, Wigtownshire. Her crew survived. She was on a voyage from Carmarthen to Greenock, Renfrewshire.
Foyle Packet	United Kingdom	The schooner was discovered in a derelict condition in the Irish Sea by the steamship Defence (United Kingdom). She was towed in to Liverpool, Lancashire.
Friendship	United Kingdom	The galiot ran aground on the Annat Bank, off the mouth of the River Tay. Her three crew were rescued by the Montrose Lifeboat Mincing Lane ( Royal National Lifeboat Institution).
James and Louisa	United Kingdom	The fishing vessel ran aground at Redcar, Yorkshire. She was refloated and taken in to Hartlepool, County Durham.
Ruder	Norway	The barque ran aground on the Crosby Spit, in Liverpool Bay. She was refloated and towed in to the River Mersey.
St. Elwine	United Kingdom	The brigantine was driven into the schooners Eldred and Jasper (1 and then drove ashore at St. Ives, Cornwall.
Therese	France	The ship was wrecked at Guadeloupe. Her crew were rescued. She was on a voyage from Newcastle upon Tyne, Northumberland, United Kingdom to Guadeloupe.

== 16 January ==
List of shipwrecks: 16 January 1871
Ship	State	Description
Anna Boot	United Kingdom	The schooner ran aground on the Pamso, off the Dutch coast. She was on a voyage from Leith, Lothian to Rotterdam, South Holland, Netherlands. She was refloated the next day and towed in to Rotterdam.
Billow	United Kingdom	The brigantine was driven ashore and wrecked at Lamlash, Isle of Arran. She was on a voyage from Irvine, Ayrshire to Belfast, County Antrim.
Cambrian	United Kingdom	The steamship was driven ashore at Lepe, Hampshire. She was on a voyage from the Cape of Good Hope, Cape Colony to Southampton, Hampshire. She was refloated the next day and taken in to Southampton.
Charlton	United Kingdom	The steamship was driven ashore at Newhaven, Sussex. Three of her crew were rescued by the Coastguard using rocket apparatus; the rest decided to remain on board. She was on a voyage from London to Saint-Nazaire, Ille-et-Vilaine, France. Charlton was refloated on 20 January and taken in to Newhaven.
Driver	United Kingdom	The ship was driven ashore and wrecked near the Tarbat Ness Lighthouse, Ross-shire. She was on a voyage from Sunderland, County Durham to Tain, Ross-shire.
Eleuthera	United Kingdom	The ship collided with the brig George and Richard (United Kingdom) off the Eddystone Lighthouse and was beached at the mouth of the Yealm River, where she was wrecked with the loss of five of the eighteen people on board. Eleuthera was on a voyage from Sunderland, County Durham to Galle, Ceylon.
Elizabeth and Cicely	(United Kingdom of Great Britain and Ireland) Guernsey	The ship was driven ashore and wrecked at Rye Harbour, Sussex. Her eight crew were rescued by the Rye Lifeboat Storm Sprite ( Royal National Lifeboat Institution). Elizabeth and Cicely was on a voyage from Guernsey to London.
Evenna	United Kingdom	The ship ran aground on Seeder's Bank, in the Irish Sea off the coast of County Waterford. She was on a voyage from Newport, Monmouthshire to Waterford.
Fatled	United Kingdom	The ship was driven ashore and wrecked at Plymouth, Devon with the loss of five of her eighteen crew.
Fairy	United Kingdom	The ship was driven ashore and sank on Islay, Inner Hebrides.
Flora	United Kingdom	The brig was driven ashore and wrecked at Great Yarmouth, Norfolk. Her crew were rescued by the Great Yarmouth Lifeboat. She was on a voyage from Hartlepool, County Durham to Poole, Dorset. She was refloated on 19 January and taken in to Great Yarmouth in a severely leaky condition.
Florence	United Kingdom	The galiot was driven ashore and wrecked at Lossiemouth, Lothian. Her four crew were rescued. She was on a voyage from Sunderland to Littleferry, Sutherland. She was refloated on 26 January and taken in to Lossiemouth.
Friendship	United Kingdom	The ketch was wrecked on the Annat Bank, off Montrose, Forfarshire. Her three crew were rescued by the Montrose Lifeboat Mincing Lane ( Royal National Lifeboat Institution)
General Outram	United Kingdom	The steamship foundered off "Rutnagherry", India with the loss of 53 of the 88 people on board. Survivors were rescued by the steamship Philox (United Kingdom). General Outram was on a voyage from Cochin to Bombay.
Kalua, or Kurus	Russia	The schooner sank at Great Yarmouth with the loss of two of her crew. Survivors were rescued by the Gorleston Lifeboat. She was on a voyage from Hull, Yorkshire, United Kingdom to Marseille, Bouches-du-Rhône, France.
Kenilworth Castle	United Kingdom	The ship was sighted in the Atlantic Ocean (6°31′N 23°17′W) whilst on a voyage from Calcutta, India to London. No further trace, presumed foundered with the loss of all hands.
Lady Huntley	United Kingdom	The brigantine was driven ashore and sank at Ramsey, Isle of Man. Her four crew were rescued by the Ramsey Lifeboat Manchester Two Sisters ( Royal National Lifeboat Institution). Lady Huntley was on a voyage from Maryport, Cumberland to Dublin.
Mary	United Kingdom	The schooner was driven ashore and sank at Berwick upon Tweed, Northumberland. Her crew were rescued. She was on a voyage from South Shields, County Durham to Ramsgate, Kent. Also reported to have sunk on the Felixtowe Ridge, off the coast of Suffolk.
Mary Louisa	New Zealand	The 19-ton ketch capsized in a sudden storm at the mouth of Pelorus Sound / Te Hoiere, New Zealand.
Mary Stewart	United Kingdom	The schooner was driven ashore in Loch Ryan and was abandoned by her crew. She floated off, drove across the loch, came ashore and was wrecked.
Reform	United Kingdom	The lugger struck Deal Pier, Kent and foundered with the loss of eleven of her fourteen crew. She was answering a distress call.
Salmon	United Kingdom	The ship was driven ashore and wrecked at Tresco, Isles of Scilly. She was on a voyage from London to East London, Cape Colony.
St. Philomene	France	The ship was driven ashore at Bournemouth, Hampshire, United Kingdom. Her crew were rescued. She was on a voyage from Isigny-sur-Mer, Calvados to Cherbourg, Seine-Inférieure.
Traveller	United Kingdom	The ship was wrecked on the Stoney Binks, off the mouth of the Humber. Her crew were rescued by the Spurn Lifeboat. She was on a voyage from London to Hull, Yorkshire.
Vertranen	Flag unknown	The barque was wrecked on the Roker Rock, North Shields, Northumberland, United Kingdom. Her crew were rescued. She was on a voyage from London to South Shields.
Victory	United Kingdom	The sloop was driven ashore at Scrabster, Caithness. She was refloated and assisted in to Scrabster in a severely leaky condition.
Wayford	United Kingdom	The ship foundered at Ballyteague, County Wexford with the loss of all eighteen crew.
Unnamed	Flag unknown	The brig was driven ashore at Deal, Kent.
Unnamed	France	The ship was driven ashore on the Shipledge, off the Isle of Wight, United Kingdom. Her seven crew were rescued.
Four unnamed vessels	United Kingdom	The Thames barges sank in the River Thames upstream of London Bridge. One sank at St. Thomas's Hospital with the loss of both crew.

== 17 January ==
List of shipwrecks: January 1871
Ship	State	Description
Alacrity	United Kingdom	The ship was driven ashore at Ramsgate, Kent. She was on a voyage from Blyth, Northumberland to Honfleur, Calvados, France. She was refloated and assisted in to Ramgsate in a leaky condition.
Anna	France	The chasse-marée was driven ashore and wrecked at Grange Chine, Isle of Wight, United Kingdom. Her crew were rescued. She was on a voyage from Mesquer, Loire-Inférieure to Rouen, Seine-Inférieure.
Atlas	United Kingdom	The brig sprang a leak and was beached at Grimsby, Lincolnshire. She was on a voyage from Hartlepool, County Durham to London.
Charles	United Kingdom	The ship was driven ashore at West Hartlepool, County Durham. She was on a voyage from Littlehampton, Sussex to West Hartlepool. She was refloated.
Guitar	United Kingdom	The schooner was driven ashore at Warrenpoint, County Antrim. She was later refloated.
Justine	(France) Algeria	The brigantine was wrecked between Bône and Philippeville.
Prigitano	Spain	The ship was wrecked near Bône.
Skudesnaes	Norway	The ship was wrecked on Heligoland. Her crew were rescued. She was on a voyage from London to Harburg.
Wayfarer	United Kingdom	The ship was driven ashore and wrecked at Kilmore, County Wexford. Her crew were rescued. She was on a voyage from London to Liverpool, Lancashire.
William and Henry	United Kingdom	The ship was driven onto the Friars Bank, off Beaumaris, Anglesey. She was on a voyage from Wicklow to Liverpool.
Unnamed	France	The ship was wrecked between "Gigelly" and Phillippeville.

== 18 January ==
List of shipwrecks: 18 January 1871
Ship	State	Description
Effort	(United Kingdom of Great Britain and Ireland) Guernsey	The brigantine departed from Guernsey for London. Presumed foundered with the loss of all eight crew. Wreckage discovered off Whitstable, Kent was thought to have come from the ship.
Minerva	United Kingdom	The ship ran aground and was damaged at King's Lynn, Norfolk. She was on a voyage from King's Lynn to Newcastle upon Tyne, Northumberland.
Mystery	United Kingdom	The ship ran aground at Great Yarmouth, Norfolk. She was on a voyage from Dundee, Forfarshire to London.
Rosa	Netherlands	The ship ran aground at Vlissingen, Zeeland. She was on a voyage from Havana, Cuba to Vlissingen. She was refloated and towed in to Terneuzen, Zeeland.

== 19 January ==
List of shipwrecks: 19 January 1871
Ship	State	Description
Algiers	France	The brig was driven ashore and wrecked at St. Ives, Cornwall, United Kingdom. Her crew were rescued.
Alma	United Kingdom	The barque was driven ashore at Livorno, Italy.
Bachelina	Italy	The ship was wrecked at San Pier d'Arena. Her crew were rescued.
Due Amici	Italy	The ship was driven ashore at Vado Ligure.
Enterprise	United Kingdom	The paddle steamer ran aground on the West Hoyle Bank, in Liverpool Bay. She was on a voyage from Liverpool, Lancashire to Dublin.
Eroe	Italy	The schooner was driven ashore and wrecked at Livorno.
Evangelina	Greece	The brig was driven ashore and damaged at Livorno.
Maria Ferguson	United States	The ship was wrecked near the Loggerhead Lighthouse, in the Dry Tortugas, Florida. She was on a voyage from Mobile to Liverpool.
Newsky	United Kingdom	The steamship ran aground at Redcar, North Riding of Yorkshire. She was on a voyage from Bilbao, Spain to Middlesbrough, Yorkshire. She was refloated the next day and resumed her voyage.
Padre Mimbelli	Italy	The full-rigged ship was driven ashore at Livorno.
Rachelina	Italy	The ship was wrecked at San Pier d'Arena. Her crew were rescued.
Rosa	Italy	The brig was driven ashore and wrecked at Livorno.
Springbok	United Kingdom	The ship was driven ashore at Coatham, Yorkshire. She was on a voyage from Aberdeen to Middlesbrough.

== 20 January ==
List of shipwrecks: 20 January 1871
Ship	State	Description
Caroline	United Kingdom	The schooner collided with the ship Sea Star (United Kingdom) and was abandoned 20 nautical miles (37 km) east of Cape Bon, Beylik of Tunis. Her crew were rescued by Sea Star. Caroline was on a voyage from Agrigento, Sicily, Italy to Porto, Portugal.
City of Aberdeen	United Kingdom	The steamship was driven ashore and severely damaged at Portlethen, Aberdeenshire. All on board were rescued. She was on a voyage from Aberdeen to London.
Halston	France	The steamship was driven ashore at Le Verdon-sur-Mer, Gironde.
Java	Flag unknown	The brigantine ran aground at Sierra Leone. She was consequently condemned.
Rosareo Antonino	Spain	The ship was wrecked at Santander with the loss of five of her crew.
Volante	United Kingdom	The sloop was run into by the steamship Conservator (United Kingdom and sank off Scarborough, Yorkshire. Her crew were rescued by Conservator.

== 21 January ==
List of shipwrecks: 21 January 1871
Ship	State	Description
Carolina	Germany	The barque was sighted off the Old Head of Kinsale, County Cork, United Kingdom whilst on a voyage from Philadelphia, Pennsylvania, United States to Cork. Presumed foundered off Galley Head, County Cork with the loss of all hands; wreckage thought to be from the ship was found by Goethe (Germany).
Consuelo	Spain	The ship was wrecked near Santa Martha.
Equator	United Kingdom	The brig collided with a barque and sank in the English Channel 9 nautical miles (17 km) south south west of Hastings, Sussex. Her crew were rescued. She was on a voyage from Cuba to Alloa, Clackmannanshire.
Fashion	United Kingdom	The schooner was driven ashore and wrecked on the Isle of Arran. Her crew survived. She was on a voyage from Troon, Ayrshire to Killybegs, County Donegal.
Gannet	United Kingdom	The steamship was driven ashore at Blankenberge, West Flanders, Belgium. She was on a voyage from Liverpool, Lancashire to Antwerp, Belgium. She was refloated.
Isabella	United Kingdom	The ship ran aground and was wrecked at Whitehaven, Cumberland.

== 22 January ==
List of shipwrecks: 22 January 1871
Ship	State	Description
Fantome	United Kingdom	The brig sprang a leak was abandoned 30 nautical miles (56 km) off Terceira Island, Azores. Her crew were rescued by the steamship Margaret (United Kingdom) and a schooner. Fantome was on a voyage from Sombrero, Anguilla to Gloucester.
Industry	United Kingdom	The ship was driven ashore at Filey, Yorkshire. Her crew were rescued.
Maria	New Zealand	The ship was driven ashore at Bacton, Norfolk, United Kingdom. Her nineteen crew were rescued by the Bacton Lifeboat. She was on a voyage from Norway to Dunedin.

== 23 January ==
List of shipwrecks: 23 January 1871
Ship	State	Description
Callirrhoe	United Kingdom	The ship ran aground in the River Thames at Blackwall, Middlesex. She was on a voyage from Calcutta, India to London.
Chase	United Kingdom	The ship was abandoned at off Penarth, Glamorgan.
Hero	United Kingdom	The ship was wrecked on the Isle of Whithorn, Wigtownshire. She was on a voyage from Maryport, Cumberland to Belfast, County Antrim.
John and Mary	United Kingdom	The ship departed from London for Gainsborough, Lincolnshire. No further trace, presumed foundered with the loss of all hands.
Lizzie and Annie	United Kingdom	The brig ran aground on the Corton Sand, in the North Sea off the coast of Suffolk and was abandoned with the loss of one of her nine crew. Survivors were rescued by a lifeboat. She was on a voyage from Sunderland, County Durham to Alexandria, Egypt.
Maize	United Kingdom	The ship was driven ashore near South Shields, County Durham. Her crew were rescued. She was on a voyage from Boulogne, Pas-de-Calais, France to South Shields. She broke up on 30 January.
Psyche	United Kingdom	The ship struck a rock and sank at Amoy, China. Her crew were rescued.
Utility	United Kingdom	The schooner collided with the Bull Lightship ( Trinity House) and sank. Her crew were rescued.
William Ash	United Kingdom	The ship was wrecked on the Corton Sand. Her crew were rescued by the Gorleston Lifeboat. She was on a voyage from South Shields, County Durham to Dunkirk, Nord, France.

== 24 January ==
List of shipwrecks: 24 January 1871
Ship	State	Description
Barbara	United Kingdom	The ship was wrecked at Roman River, or in the Roma River.
Catherine and John	Canada	The schooner was abandoned in the Atlantic Ocean. Her crew were rescued by the barque Agnes Campbell (United Kingdom). Catherine and John was on a voyage from Saint John, New Brunswick to Matanzas, Cuba.
City of Auckland	United Kingdom	The ship caught fire at Auckland, New Zealand and was scuttled. She was refloated on 7 February.
Irishman	United Kingdom	The steamship collided with the steamship Kintyre (United Kingdom) in the Clyde and was beached.
Kate	United Kingdom	The schooner was wrecked at Tampico, Mexico. Her crew were rescued.
Prins Carl	Flag unknown	The ship ran aground on the Pearl Rock. She was on a voyage from Trieste to London, United Kingdom. She was refloated and towed in to Gibraltar by the steamship Evadne (United Kingdom).
Starling	United Kingdom	The schooner struck the breakwater and sank at Great Yarmouth, Norfolk.
Sydney	United Kingdom	The barque was abandoned in the Atlantic Ocean. She was on a voyage from Demerara, British Guiana to Queenstown, County Cork.

== 25 January ==
List of shipwrecks: 25 January 1871
Ship	State	Description
Charles Gray	United Kingdom	The schooner ran aground on the Blacktail Sand, in the Thames Estuary.
Fire King	United Kingdom	The steamship was driven ashore at Tranmere, Cheshire. She was on a voyage from Glasgow, Renfrewshire to Liverpool, Lancashire. She was refloated and taken in to Liverpool for repairs.
Hannibal	United Kingdom	The ship was wrecked near "Eyjafjalla", Iceland. Her crew were rescued. She was on a voyage from Liverpool to Iceland.
John and Susannah	United Kingdom	The sloop ran aground on the Barnard Sand, in the North Sea off the coast of Suffolk and was wrecked with the loss of all three of her crew. She was on a voyage from Lowestoft, Suffolk to London.
Louisa	United Kingdom	The ship ran aground on the Old Harry Ledges. She was on a voyage from Newport to Southampton. She was refloated on 27 January
Lydia	France	The schooner was wrecked near Le Conquet, Finistère. Her crew were rescued. She was on a voyage from Cardiff, Glamorgan, United Kingdom to L'Orient, Morbihan.
Ocean	United Kingdom	The barque ran aground on a reef off the Itacolomi Lighthouse, Brazil. She was on a voyage from Maranhão, Brazil to Pensacola, Florida, United States. She was refloated and put back to Maranhão in a leaky condition.
Sarah	United Kingdom	The brig was wrecked on the Margate Sands, off Margate, Kent in a storm. Her six crew were rescued by the Margate Lifeboat Quiver ( Royal National Lifeboat Institution). Sarah was on a voyage from Sunderland, County Durham to Southampton, Hampshire.
Sovereign	United Kingdom	The schooner ran aground on the Blacktail Sand. She was later refloated and taken in to Southend, Essex in a severely leaky condition.
Unnamed	United Kingdom	The ferryboat was run down and sunk in the River Ely by the steamship Johns (United Kingdom).

== 26 January ==
List of shipwrecks: 26 January 1871
Ship	State	Description
Erin	United Kingdom	The schooner was run into by the steamship Ybarra (Spain) and sank in the River Wye at Newport, Monmouthshire. Her crew were rescued. Erin was on a voyage from Newport to Waterford.
Kate Smith	United States	The barque was wrecked at Little Egg Harbor, New Jersey with the loss of ten of the fourteen people on board. She was on a voyage from the South Passages to New York.
Mary Ann	(United Kingdom of Great Britain and Ireland) Jamaica	The ship capsized at Saint Vincent. Her crew were rescued.
Pride	United Kingdom	The barque ran aground on the Nore. She was on a voyage from Erith, Kent to Great Yarmouth, Norfolk. She was refloated the next day and taken in to Sheerness, Kent.
Queen	United Kingdom	The brigantine was driven ashore at Ballyferris Point, County Down. She was on a voyage from Caernarfon to Londonderry. She was refloated and resumed her voyage.
Shamrock	New Zealand	The 23-ton cutter grounded and was wrecked on the Whangapoua bar, New Zealand.
Vincent J. Wallace	United States	The ship was destroyed by fire off Môle-Saint-Nicolas, Haiti. Her crew were rescued. She was on a voyage from New York to Jacmel, Haiti.
Wasp	United States	The barque was driven ashore and wrecked east of Gibraltar.

== 27 January ==
List of shipwrecks: 27 January 1871
Ship	State	Description
Forest King	United States	The schooner was wrecked in Barclay Sound. Her crew were rescued. She was on a voyage from Honolulu, Hawaii to Port Gamble, Washington Territory.
Kensington	United States	The steamship collided with the barque Templar (Argentina) and sank in the Atlantic Ocean 60 nautical miles (110 km) north north east of Cape Hatteras, North Carolina. All fifty people on board were rescued by the steamship Georgia (United States). Kensington was on a voyage from Savannah, Georgia to Boston, Massachusetts. Templar was on a voyage from Baltimore, Maryland to Rio de Janeiro, Brazil, was towed into Hampton Roads and repaired.
Maggie	United Kingdom	The brig was driven ashore near Weymouth, Dorset. She was on a voyage from Cardiff, Glamorgan to Southampton, Hampshire.
Samuel and Sarah	United Kingdom	The brig was run into by the barque Johanna Engels (Belgium) and sank in the North Sea 10 nautical miles (19 km) off Cromer, Norfolk. Her five crew were rescued by the barque Robert Adamson (United Kingdom). Samuel and Sarah was on a voyage from South Shields, County Durham to a French port.

== 28 January ==
List of shipwrecks: 28 January 1871
Ship	State	Description
Beaver	United Kingdom	The fishing smack collided with the steamship Rose (United Kingdom) and sank in the Irish Sea off Morecambe, Lancashire. Her crew were rescued by Rose.
HMS Torch	Royal Navy	The Philomel-class gunvessel was driven ashore. Subsequently refloated, repaired and returned to service.
Violet	United Kingdom	The ship was wrecked on the Longships, Cornwall. Her crew were rescued.
Wakefield	United Kingdom	The schooner sprang a leak and sank in Conway Bay. Her crew were rescued. She was on a voyage from Bangor, Caernarfonshire to Chester, Cheshire.
W. R. Arthur	United States	The steamboat suffered a boiler explosion and fire in the Mississippi River 14 nautical miles (26 km) upstream of Memphis, Tennessee with the loss of 87 lives. She was on a voyage from New Orleans, Louisiana to Louisville, Kentucky.

== 29 January ==
List of shipwrecks: 29 January 1871
Ship	State	Description
Midsummer	United Kingdom	The barque was damaged by fire at Swansea, Glamorgan.
Morton Castle	United Kingdom	The schooner was driven ashore at Sunderland, County Durham.
Omaha	United States	The ship was driven ashore in the Ossabaw Sound. She was on a voyage from Liverpool, Lancashire, United Kingdom to Savannah, Georgia. She was later refloated and completed her voyage.
Susannah	Spain	The ship was driven ashore in Ossabaw Sound. She was on a voyage from Havana, Cuba to Savannah. She broke up during efforts to refloat her.

== 30 January ==
List of shipwrecks: 30 January 1871
Ship	State	Description
Alfred Hall	United States	The schooner was driven ashore and wrecked at Little Egg Harbor, New Jersey. She was on a voyage from a port in Virginia to New York.
Batallion	United Kingdom	The steamship was wrecked on the Longsand, in the North Sea off the coast of Essex. Her crew were rescued, but three people lost their lives effecting the rescue. She was on a voyage from Leith, Lothian to São Miguel Island, Azores.
Camco	United Kingdom	The steam large was driven ashore near Arbroath, Forfarshire. She was refloated on 16 February and taken in to Kirkcaldy, Fife.
Commodore	United Kingdom	The steamship was driven ashore on Scharhörn, Germany. She was on a voyage from Grimsby, Lincolnshire to Glückstadt, Germany.
Jane Hardman	(United Kingdom of Great Britain and Ireland) Grenada	The schooner was wrecked at Barbados.
John S. Wainwright	Canada	The schooner was abandoned at sea. She subsequently came ashore at the mouth of the Inhambane River and was wrecked.
Kanagona	United Kingdom	The brig was run down and sunk in the English Channel off Portland, Dorset by the steamship Mauritius (United Kingdom). Her crew were rescued. Kanangona was on a voyage from Saint Paul de Loanda, Portuguese East Africa to London.
Lady Claremont	United Kingdom	The ship foundered in the Atlantic Ocean. Her crew took to a boat; they were rescued on 9 February by Assunta (Argentina). Lady Claremont was on a voyage from the Cape Verde Islands to Rio de Janeiro, Brazil.
Mary G. Hall	United Kingdom	The schooner was driven ashore and wrecked at Little Egg Harbor. Her crew were rescued by a lifeboat.

== 31 January ==
List of shipwrecks: 31 January 1871
Ship	State	Description
Dania	Denmark	The schooner was abandoned off Todhead, Aberdeenshire, United Kingdom. Her five crew were rescued by the Montrose Lifeboat Mincing Lane ( Royal National Lifeboat Institution). Dania was on a voyage from Bergen, Norway to Leith, Lothian, United Kingdom. She was towed in to Montrose, Forfarshire, United Kingdom the next day.
E. R. J.	United Kingdom	The schooner was wrecked on St Martin's, Isles of Scilly. Her crew were rescued. She was on a voyage from Montevideo, Uruguay to Sunderland, County Durham.
Glenfeadon	United Kingdom	The schooner collided with I. R. Hea (United Kingdom) 9 nautical miles (17 km) south west of the Mumbles, Glamorgan and was abandoned by her crew. Glenfeadon was on a voyage from Truro, Cornwall to Neath, Glamorgan. She was subsequently towed in to Swansea, Glamorgan by the tug Piero Gomez (United Kingdom).
Hallo	Norway	The brig was wrecked near Buddon, Forfarshire with the loss of all hands.
Ocean Ranger	United States	The ship was driven ashore on Petit Bois Island, Mississippi. She was on a voyage from Rio de Janeiro, Brazil to Mobile, Alabama. She was later refloated and completed her voyage, arriving at Mobile on 8 February.
Scout	United Kingdom	The steamship ran aground off Cap Gris Nez, Pas-de-Calais, France. She was refloated and towed in to Calais.

== Unknown date ==
List of shipwrecks: Unknown date in January 1871
Ship	State	Description
A. A. Drebert	United States	The ship was wrecked off Cerro Molle, Peru.
Ada	Canada	The ship was driven ashore in the Gut of Canso.
Adele	United Kingdom	The ship was driven ashore north of Porto, Portugal.
Adelaide	United Kingdom	The ship was lost at Mayaguana, Bahamas. She was on a voyage from Maracaibo, Venezuela to Manila, Spanish East Indies.
Alert	United Kingdom	The ship was driven ashore. She was on a voyage from South Shields, County Durham to London. She was refloated and taken in to Lowestoft, Suffolk in a leaky condition.
Alexandre	France	The ship was driven ashore near Marbella, Spain. Her crew were rescued. She was on a voyage from Cartagena, Spain to an English port.
Amoor	United Kingdom	The ship ran aground. She was refloated and taken in to Plymouth, Devon for repairs.
Amykos	Danzig	The barque ran aground at Ystad, Sweden. She was on a voyage from Danzig to Belfast, County Antrim, United Kingdom. She was refloated and taken in to Rønne, Denmark.
Andrew Lovitt	United States	The ship was driven ashore on Spiekeroog, Prussia. She was on a voyage from Savannah, Georgia to Bremen. She was refloated on 18 January and taken in to Bremerhaven.
Anfrilrite	Ottoman Empire	The ship was wrecked near Mangalia before 13 January.
Anna	United Kingdom	The brig was abandoned in the Atlantic Ocean before 24 January. Her crew were rescued by Edgar (United Kingdom).
Appin	United Kingdom	The steamship ran aground on the Shingle Spit. She was refloated and taken in to Zhoushan, China.
Apton	United Kingdom	The brig was abandoned at sea. She came ashore at "Chekogin Point", United States.
Ariel	New South Wales	The steamship caught fire in the Murray River.
August and Charlotte	Flag unknown	The ship was abandoned in ice off Varberg, Sweden.
Avenir	United Kingdom	The ship was driven ashore near Gibraltar. She was on a voyage from Oran, Algeria to London. She was refloated.
Avoca	United Kingdom	The ship heeled over at Dundalk, County Louth. She filled when the tide rose.
Baron Heemstra	Netherlands	The steamship was abandoned in ice in the "Meir".
Black Brothers	United States	The ship sank whilst on a voyage from Antwerp, Belgium to Philadelphia, Pennsylvania.
Bretagne	France	The steamship was wrecked at Cape Shablar, Ottoman Empire. Her crew were rescued.
Cambria	United Kingdom	The ship was driven ashore at Donaghadee, County Down. She was refloated.
Cameo	United Kingdom	The steamship was driven ashore at Arbroath, Forfarshire.
Carobel	United States	The barque was wrecked before 10 January. Her crew were rescued by the barque Catharine (Flag unknown) . Carobel was on a voyage from Manila, Spanish East Indies to New York.
Catherine and Mary	United Kingdom	The schooner ran aground near Kilrush, County Clare. She was on a voyage from Kilrush to Liverpool, Lancashire.
Chedabucto	Canada Canada	The ship was driven ashore at St. Peter's, Nova Scotia. She was on a voyage from Chaleur Bay to Saint John's, Newfoundland Colony.
Chloe	United Kingdom	The steamship collided with the steamship Jane Bacon (United Kingdom) and sank off St Bees Head, Cumberland with the loss of a crew member. Also reported as Jane Bacon being run down by Chloe.
City of Baltimore	United Kingdom	The steamship was driven ashore at Sandy Hook, New Jersey, United States. She was on a voyage from New York to Liverpool. She was later refloated and resumed her voyage.
Clara	United Kingdom	The ship ran aground at "Lianho", China. She was on a voyage from Shantou to Niuzhuang, China.
Clarendon	United Kingdom	The ship was lost in the South China Sea.
Clifford	(United Kingdom of Great Britain and Ireland) Jamaica	The schooner was wrecked at Ocho Rios. She was on a voyage from St. Jago de Cuba, Cuba to Jamaica.
Constantine	Sweden	The ship was driven ashore on Skagen, Denmark. She was on a voyage from Exmouth, Devon to Gothenburg.
Copse	United Kingdom	The brig caught fire at St. Ubes, Portugal and was scuttled. Her ten crew were rescued. She was on a voyage from Almería, Spain to the River Tyne.
Cornwall	United Kingdom	The schooner collided with Jacinta (Portugal) and sank in the Bristol Channel with the loss of a crew member. She was on a voyage from Plymouth to Newport, Monmouthshire.
Cornwall, or Cromwell	United Kingdom	The ship was wrecked at Minatitlán, Mexico.
Cornwallis	United Kingdom	The ship departed from Hartlepool, County Durham for Philadelphia. No further trace, presumed foundered with the loss of all hands.
C. White	Canada	The ship was driven ashore at Yarmouth, Nova Scotia. She was on a voyage from Saint John, New Brunswick to Fall River, Massachusetts, United States.
Delaware	United States	The steamship ran aground on the Fisherman's Flat, in the Hooghly River. She was refloated and resumed her voyage.
Delphin	Sweden	The ship was abandoned in ice off Visby.
Duchess of Beaufort	United Kingdom	The ship foundered in the English Channel off the coast of Devon between 12 and 20 January with the loss of all six crew. She was on a voyage from Newcastle upon Tyne, Northumberland to Torquay, Devon.
Dunsmole	United Kingdom	The ship was abandoned at sea.
Edith	United Kingdom	The ship ran aground off Huelva, Spain. She was on a voyage from Huelva to Liverpool. She was refloated and resumed her voyage, but consequently put in to Falmouth, Cornwall on 24 January in a severely leaky condition.
Edward	Russia	The galiot was driven ashore at Espinho, Portugal. She was on a voyage from Bahia, Brazil to Porto.
Elangowan	Norway	The brig was wrecked near Strömstad. Her crew were rescued. She was on a voyage from Alloa, Clackmannanshire, United Kingdom to Christiania.
Eleanor	United Kingdom	The brig ran aground near Hellevoetsluis, Zeeland, Netherlands. She was on a voyage from London to Rotterdam, South Holland. She was refloated and assisted in to Rotterdam.
Eliza Lee	United Kingdom	The ship ran aground. She was on a voyage from Jersey to Guernsey, Channel Islands.
Ellon Castle	United Kingdom	The ship was lost at "Lianho". She was on a voyage from Shantou to Niuzhuang.
Emilie	France	The smack was driven ashore and wrecked near Weymouth, Dorset, United Kingdom. Her crew were rescued.
Emilie, or Emillys	United Kingdom	The ship ran aground on Watson's Shoal. She was refloated and taken in to Warrenpoint, County Antrim.
Evenus	United Kingdom	The ship ran aground off Waterford. She was on a voyage from Newport to Waterford.
Falkland	United Kingdom	The barque was wrecked on the Salt Keys. Her crew survived. She was on a voyage from Pensacola, Florida to Belfast.
Fanny	United Kingdom	The ship foundered on or before 9 January with the loss of six of her crew. She was on a voyage from Sunderland, County Durham to Stettin.
Fides	Germany	The ship foundered off the mouth of the Weser with the loss of a crew member. She was on a voyage from Burntisland, Fife, United Kingdom to Geestemünde.
Francis	United Kingdom	The steamship was damaged by fire at Mobile, Alabama, United States.
Frank	Flag unknown	The ship collided with Leona (Flag unknown) and sank. She was on a voyage from Cienfuegos, Cuba to Halifax, Nova Scotia, Canada.
Fremad	Norway	The ship was driven ashore at Kamperduin, North Holland, Netherlands. She was on a voyage from Leith to Philadelphia.
Gala Placida	Flag unknown	The ship sank at "Besharka". She was on a voyage from Berdyanski, Russia to Falmouth.
Garibaldi	Italy	The ship was wrecked on the coast of Greece.
Gem of the North	United Kingdom	The ship was driven ashore at Montrose, Forfarshire.
George	United States	The ship was abandoned in the Atlantic Ocean.
Giovanni	Italy	The ship was wrecked at Spiropoli.
Gleaner	United Kingdom	The ship was wrecked at "Cape St. Antonio".
Grace	(United Kingdom of Great Britain and Ireland) Jersey	The smack ran aground on The Shingles, off the Isle of Wight. She was on a voyage from London to Torquay. She was refloated and anchored at Hurst Castle, Hampshire.
Gustava Sophia	Denmark	The ship foundered on or before 9 January. She was on a voyage from Sunderland to Copenhagen.
Haimlota	Flag unknown	The barque was driven ashore at Chinhae, Korea. She was refloated on 27 January but drove ashore again and was wrecked.
Harkaway	United Kingdom	The ship was driven ashore. She was refloated and taken in to Troon, Ayrshire.
Hiram	United Kingdom	The ship was lost in the Gut of Canso. She was on a voyage from Cow Bay, Nova Scotia to Halifax.
Hume	New South Wales	The barge capsized in the Murray River.
Innocente	Italy	The ship collided with the steamship Austrian (Flag unknown) and sank in the Sea of Marmara.
Isabel	Canada	The brig was abandoned at sea.
Isabella	United Kingdom	The schooner was driven ashore at North Berwick, Lothian. Her crew were rescued. She was refloated and towed in to Berwick upon Tweed, Northumberland.
James	Canada	The schooner foundered with the loss of all hands before 9 January. She was on a voyage from North Sydney, Nova Scotia to Halifax.
Jane Harriet	Canada	The ship was lost whilst on a voyage from Halifax to Guysborough, Nova Scotia.
Jessie	United Kingdom	The ship was driven ashore at Southend, Essex. She was on a voyage from London to Barbados. She was refloated.
Jeune Arthur	France	The ship was driven ashore and wrecked near St. Ives Head, Cornwall. She was on a voyage from Cardiff, Glamorgan, United Kingdom to Algiers, Algeria.
Jeune Sainte	France	The schooner was wrecked at Moliets-et-Maa, Landes before 28 January.
Juanita	Flag unknown	The ship was lost whilst on a voyage from San Blas to Mazatlan, Cuba.
Jungfrau	Hamburg	The ship was driven ashore at Cuxhaven. She was on a voyage from Saint Lucia to Hamburg. She was refloated.
Kate Cummings	United Kingdom	The brig was wrecked. She was on a voyage from Cow Bay to Saint John's, Newfoundland Colony.
Kathardin	United States	The ship was driven ashore at Edgartown, Massachusetts. She was on a voyage from the Rio Grande to Boston, Massachusetts.
Levine	Flag unknown	The brig ran aground at the mouth of the Rio Grande do Sul. She was refloated and put back to the Rio Grande do Sul in a leaky condition.
Libero	Italy	The ship was driven ashore at Kingstown, County Dublin, United Kingdom. She was on a voyage from Troon to Naples. She was refloated.
Ligure	Italy	The barque was driven ashore and sank near Egmond aan Zee, North Holland. She was on a voyage from Taganrog, Russia to Amsterdam, North Holland.
Lindisfarne	United Kingdom	The ship was driven ashore at Whitburn, County Durham. She was on a voyage from Rotterdam, South Holland, Netherlands to South Shields. She was refloated and taken in to South Shields.
Lord Rollo	United Kingdom	The ship was driven ashore at Kilrush, County Clare She was on a voyage from Westport, County Mayo.to the Bristol Channel. She was later refloated.
Magnet	United Kingdom	The schooner was driven ashore at Bideford, Devon.
Malvina	United Kingdom	The ship ran aground on the Maplin Sand, in the North Sea off the coast of Essex. She was refloated.
Maria Josefa	Spain	The ship was wrecked on "Goeritz Island".
Maria Kjier	Denmark	The ship was driven ashore and wrecked on Hirsholmene. She was on a voyage from Aalborg to Korsør. She was later refloated and taken in to Fredrikshavn.
Marie	France	The ship was wrecked in the Gulf of Lyon.
Marie Seraphine	Canada	The ship was wrecked. She was on a voyage from Anticosti Island, Nova Scotia to Quebec City.
Marion Emerson	United States	The ship was destroyed by fire at Bremerhaven. She was on a voyage from Savannah to Bremen, Germany.
Mary Field	United Kingdom	The ship ran aground and sank off Felixtowe, Suffolk. Her crew were rescued. She was on a voyage from South Shields to Ramsgate, Kent.
Mateo A.	Italy	The ship was wrecked on "Cape Sciabla". Her crew were rescued.
Merida	Hamburg	The ship was driven ashore on Texel, North Holland. She was on a voyage from Mexico to Hamburg. She was refloated.
Montezuma	France	The steamship ran aground on Breskins Bank, in the North Sea. She was on a voyage from Havre de Grâce, Seine-Infériure to Antwerp.
Moselle	United States	The ship was driven ashore on Folly Island, South Carolina. She was on a voyage from Saint Vincent to Charleston, South Carolina. She was later refloated and towed in to Charleston.
Nephine	Italy	The ship was driven ashore at Boston, Massachusetts. She was on a voyage from Messina, Sicily to Boston.
Netzine Bahri	Ottoman Empire	The ship was wrecked near Varna.
Neva	(Dominion of Newfoundland) Newfoundland Colony	The ship ran aground on the Gingerbread Grounds and was abandoned. She was on a voyage from Saint John's to Cárdenas, Cuba. She was refloated and towed in to Nassau, Bahamas.
Nieves	Chile	The ship was abandoned in the Pacific Ocean. She was on a voyage from the Puget Sound to Valparaíso.
Noova Vittoria	Italy	The ship was lost. She was on a voyage from Smyrna, Ottoman Empire to Trieste.
Olaf	Flag unknown	The ship was driven ashore on Reedy Island, Delaware, United States. She was on a voyage from Belfast to Philadelphia.
Orazio	Russia	The ship was driven ashore at Marseille, Bouches-du-Rhône, France. She was on a voyage from Marianople to Marseille
Pacific	United States	The ship sank. She was on a voyage from Yarmouth, Nova Scotia to Eastport, Maine.
Paolina	Greece	The ship was driven ashore in the Gulf of Burgas. She was on a voyage from the Danube to Marseille.
Peryable	United Kingdom	The ship was abandoned in the Atlantic Ocean.
Philomene	France	The ship was wrecked in the Gulf of Lyon.
Pontiac	United States	The ship was driven ashore 10 nautical miles (19 km) north of Cape Lookout. She was on a voyage from Liverpool to Boston, Massachusetts.
Rimer, or Runer	United Kingdom	The ship ran aground on the Crosby Spit, in Liverpool Bay. She was on a voyage from Sundsvall, Sweden to Liverpool. She was refloated.
R. L. Alston	United Kingdom	The steamship ran aground in the Gironde. She was refloated and taken in to Bordeaux, Gironde, France.
Rosalie Ahrens	Rostock	The ship was discovered derelict in the Kattegat.
Rosina	United States	The ship was driven ashore on Long Island, New York. She was on a voyage from Bordeaux to New York City.
Roy	United Kingdom	The ship was driven ashore in the Yangtze. She was on a voyage from Fuzhou to Shanghai, China. She was refloated.
San Vicente	Flag unknown	The ship was wrecked at "Laceobat".
Secret	United Kingdom	The smack was wrecked at the mouth of the "Sheen River", County Kerry.
Senorita	Brazil	The ship was driven ashore by ice at Sandy Point. She was on a voyage from Rio de Janeiro to Boston, Massachusetts. She was later refloated.
Shaporgee Hirgee	India	The barque was destroyed by fire at Cochin.
Siela	Chile	The ship was lost. She was on a voyage from Cobija to "Copilla".
Sophia	United Kingdom	The ship was driven ashore and severely damaged at Gallipoli, Ottoman Empire. She was on a voyage from New York to Constantinople. She was later refloated.
Spark	United Kingdom	The ship was wrecked on the coast of the Newfoundland Colony. She was on a voyage from Montreal, Quebec, Canada to Penarth, Glamorgan.
St. Antonio	Italy	The ship was driven ashore at "Lussini".
St. Louis	France	The ship foundered. She was on a voyage from Boulogne-sur-Mer, Pas-de-Calais to Marseille.
St. Louis	Belgium	The ship was driven ashore at Antwerp.
St. Peters	Canada	The ship was wrecked on Cape Breton Island, Nova Scotia. She was on a voyage from the Newfoundland Colony to Sydney, Nova Scotia.
Susana	United Kingdom	The ship was driven ashore in the Oshawa Sound.
Tekla	Denmark	The ship was wrecked at Rörö, Sweden. Her crew were rescued. She was on a voyage from Grimsby, Lincolnshire, United Kingdom to Copenhagen.
Thomas Snowden	United States	The steamship foundered in the Atlantic Ocean before 25 January. She was on a voyage from São Miguel Island to New York.
Times	United Kingdom	The steamship ran aground in the Scheldt.
Timandra	United Kingdom	The brig was driven ashore at Digby, Nova Scotia.
Trinidad	United Kingdom	The ship was driven ashore in the Dry Tortugas, Florida, United States. She was on a voyage from Havana, Cuba to Liverpool. She was refloated and taken in to Key West, Florida, where she arrived on 19 January.
Two Forty	United States	The fishing schooner was lost on Seal Island, Nova Scotia while on her homeward passage from the Grand Banks. Crew saved.
Union	United States	The ship was driven ashore on Bermuda. She was on a voyage from Saint Domingo to New York.
Ville de Dieppe	France	The barque was in collision with Blenheim (United Kingdom) and was abandoned by all but two of her crew. She was on a voyage from Cartagena to Liverpool. She was discovered by Fanny Kemble (United States), which put four crew on board. They took her in to Queenstown, County Cork, United Kingdom.
Virgilia	France	The ship was wrecked on the north point of Formosa. Her crew were rescued.
Wasper	United States	The ship was wrecked in the Dry Tortugas, Florida. She was on a voyage from Mobile to Boston, Massachusetts.
William Heinburg	Russia	The ship was wrecked near Aveiro, Portugal with the loss of a crew member. She was on a voyage from Riga to Porto.
Y. F. V.	Spain	The ship was lost in the South China Sea. She was on a voyage from Saigon, French Indo-China to Hong Kong.
