= Mikro Profitis Ilias =

Mikro Profitis Ilias is a ridge on the Greek island of Santorini. The non-volcanic ridge was greatly expanded by the geological activity of the nearby Santorini caldera.

== Formation ==
Mikro Profitis Ilias is located on the northern part of the island of Santorini, between Cape Kolumbo to the north and Cape Skaros to the immediate south. The volcanic ridge consists of a northern and southern peak, and the ridge itself lies above a large lava dome. The rock that makes up the ridge is non-volcanic and predates the 1610 BC Minoan eruption of Thera, though the immense amount of volcanic ejecta generated by the eruption did greatly expand the existing ridge line. The northern peak stands at 319.6 meters tall, while the southern peak rests one meter lower at 318 meters tall. The formation is named for the Biblical prophet Elijah.
