= Santorini caldera =

Submerged caldera in the Aegean Sea

Santorini Caldera
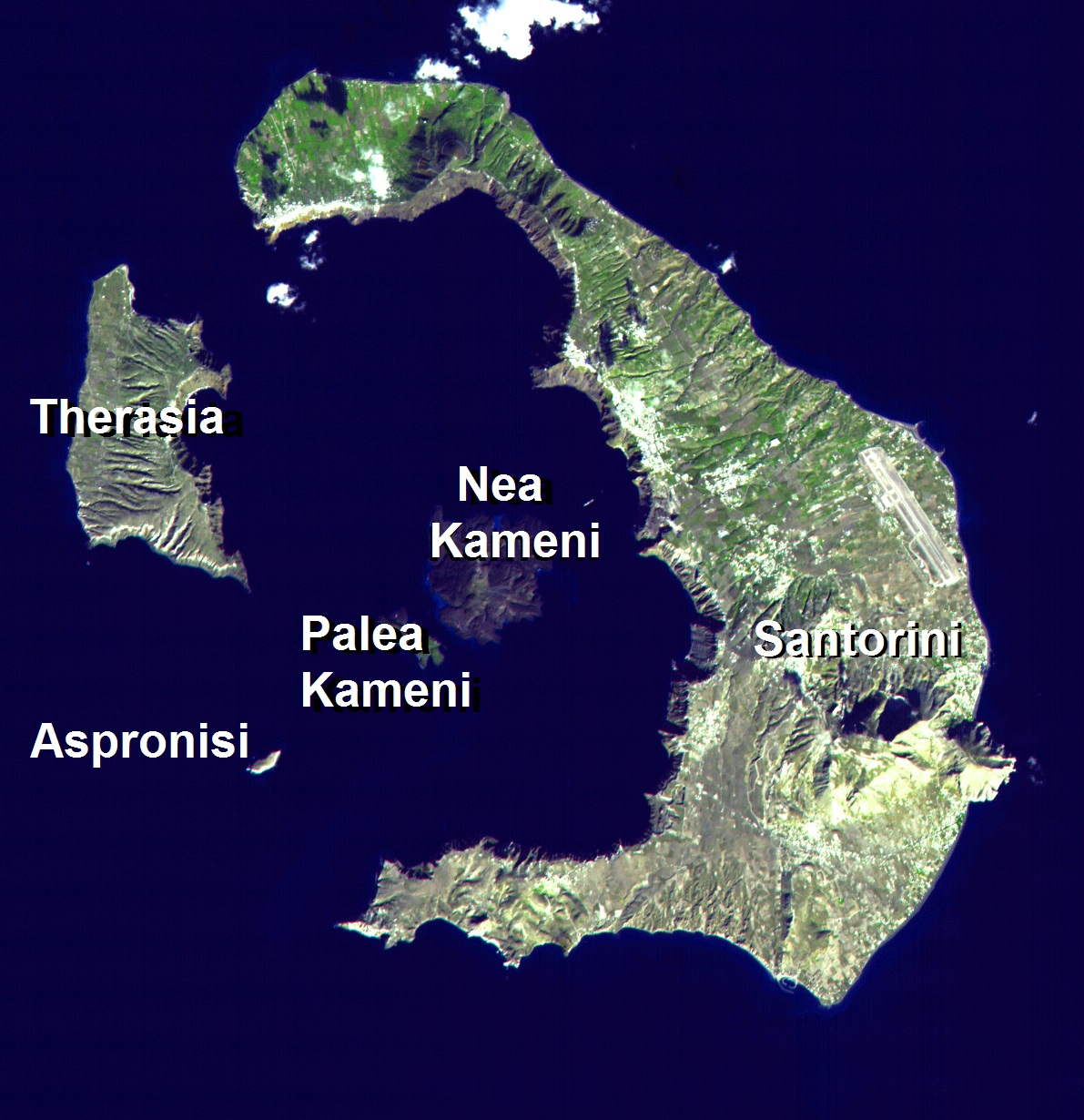
- Santorini island group from space

Highest point
- Elevation: 367 m (1,204 ft)
- Coordinates: 36°23′44″N 25°27′33″E

Geography
- Location: Aegean Sea, Greece

Geology
- Mountain type: Caldera (active)
- Last eruption: January to February 1950

The Santorini caldera is a large, mostly submerged volcanic caldera located in the southern Aegean Sea, 120 kilometers north of Crete in Greece. Visible above water is the circular Santorini island group, consisting of the main island of Santorini (known as Thera in antiquity), Therasia and Aspronisi at the periphery, and the Kameni islands at the center. It has been designated one of the world's sixteen Decade Volcanoes.

== Geography ==
Photograph of Santorini caldera from the air

The caldera measures about 12 by 7 km (7.5 by 4.3 mi), with 300 m-high (980 ft) steep cliffs on three sides, and a maximum depth of 385 m (1,263 ft). Two small volcanic islands, Nea ("New") Kameni and Palea ("Old") Kameni, are located near the center of the caldera.

The main island, Santorini, has an area of 75.8 km^{2} (29.3 sq mi), Therasia 9.3 km^{2} (3.6 sq mi), and the uninhabited islands of Nea Kameni 3.4 km^{2} (1.3 sq mi), Palea Kameni 0.5 km^{2} (0.19 sq mi) and Aspronisi 0.1 km^{2} (0.039 sq mi).

Santorini's high walls, draped by whitewashed villages, combined with a sunny climate and good observation conditions, have made it a magnet for volcanologists, as well as a highlight of tourism in the Aegean.

== Geology ==
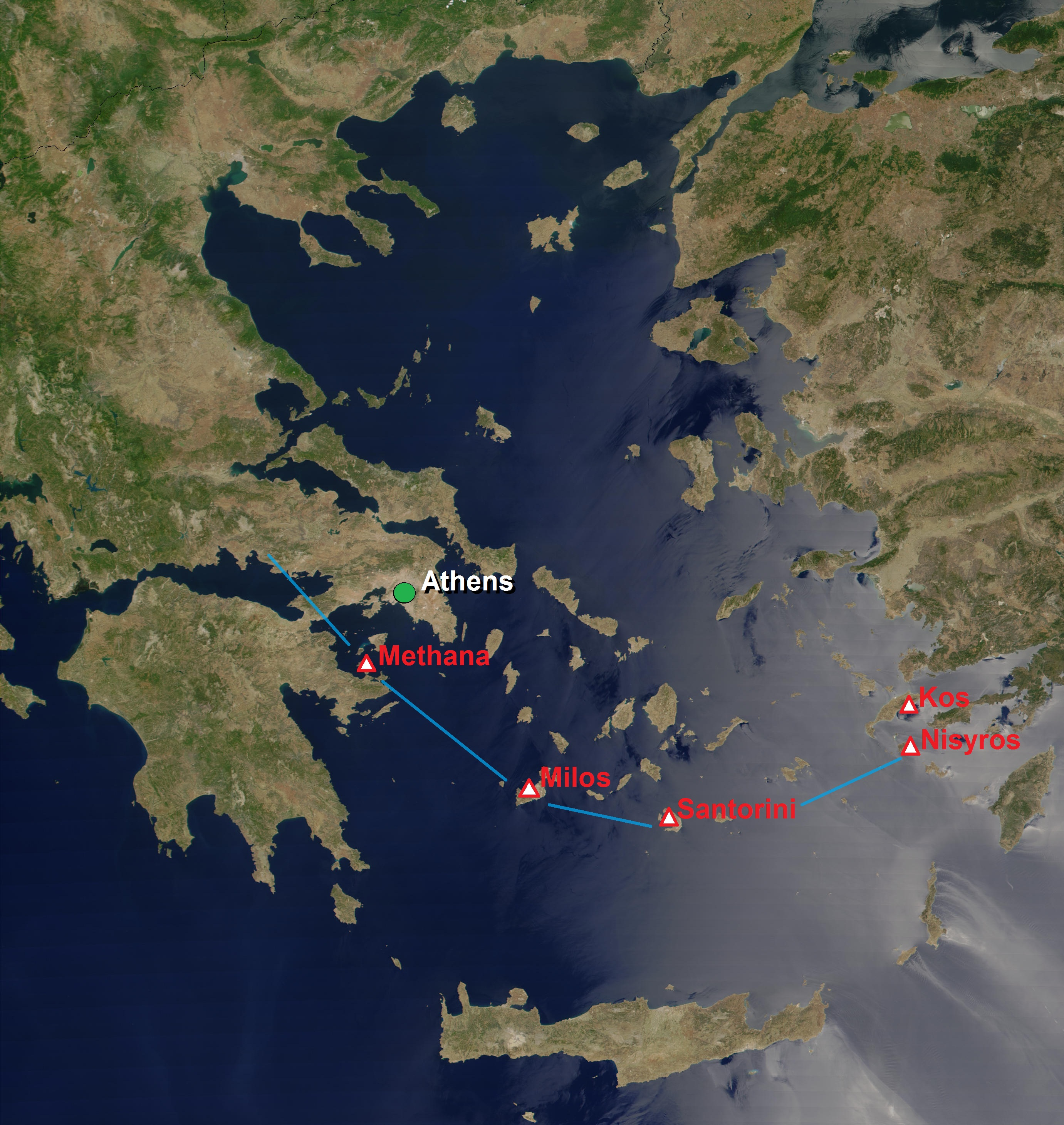
The South Aegean Volcanic Arc includes the volcanoes of Methana, Milos, Santorini and Nisyros.

The volcanic complex of Santorini is the most active part of the South Aegean Volcanic Arc, which includes the active volcanoes of Methana on the mainland of Greece, Milos, Santorini and Nisyros. It is formed by the subduction of the African tectonic plate underneath the Aegean subplate of the Eurasian tectonic plate, which occurs at a rate of up to 5 cm per year in a northeasterly direction. This subduction causes earthquakes at depths of 150–170 km.

Non-volcanic rocks are exposed on Santorini at Mikro Profititis Ilias, Mesa Vouno, the Gavrillos ridge, Pirgos, Monolithos and the inner side of the caldera wall between Cape Plaka and Athinios. The Kameni islands at the center of the caldera are made of lava rocks.

== Volcanology ==
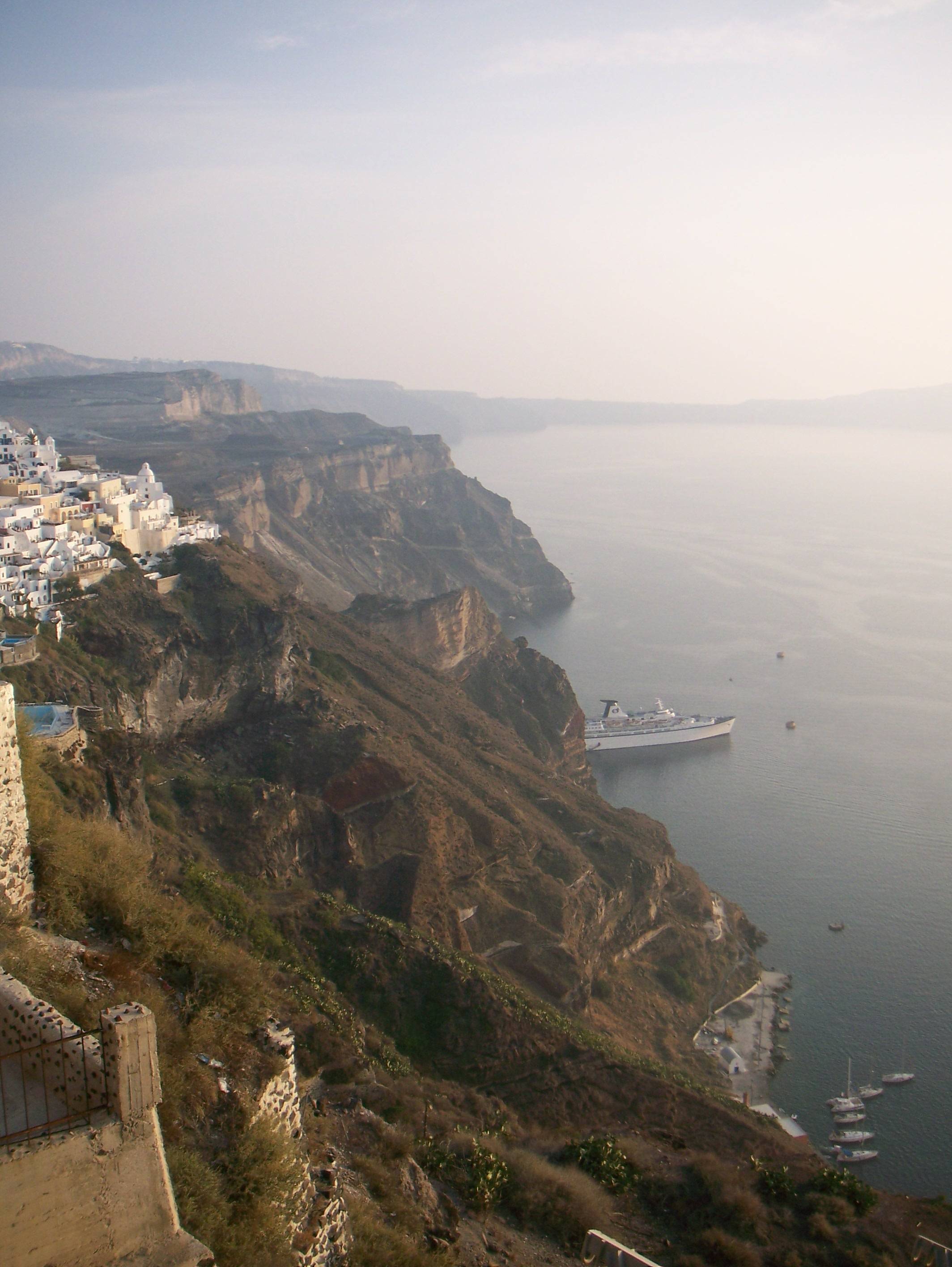
The caldera wall of Santorini island

The caldera of Santorini lies in the center of the Christiana-Santorini-Kolumbo volcanic field, which comprises the extinct Christiana volcano, the Santorini caldera, the polygenetic submarine Kolumbo volcano, as well as the Kolumbo volcanic chain. This volcanic lineament evolved during four main phases of volcanic activity, which initiated in the Pliocene from several local centers that only recently matured to form the vast Santorini edifice. The present-day caldera is composed of overlapping shield volcanoes, cut by at least four partially overlapping calderas, of which the oldest southern caldera was formed about 180,000 years ago. The subsequent Skaros caldera was created about 70,000 years ago, and the Cape Riva caldera about 21,000 years ago. The current caldera was formed about 3,600 years ago during the Minoan eruption. Palea Kameni and Nea Kameni were formed as a result of multiple, initially submarine, smaller eruptions at the center of the caldera.

== Eruptive history ==
Following is a list of the major eruptive events in Santorini's history, beginning with the catastrophic Minoan eruption, most of them listed by the Smithsonian National Museum of Natural History's Global Volcanism Program:

Start date	Stop date	Characteristics of eruption
518,000 BC	Unknown	Central vent eruption, regional fissure eruption, submarine eruption, explosive eruption, pyroclastic flows and pyroclastic surges, phreatic explosions, extensive physical damage, massive lava fountains and extensive lava flows, megatsunamis, caldera collapse.
1610 BC ± 14 years ("Minoan eruption")	Unknown	Central vent eruption, regional fissure eruption, submarine eruption, explosive eruption, pyroclastic flows and pyroclastic surges, phreatic explosions, extensive physical damage, massive lava fountains and extensive lava flows, minor mudflows on the sea, megatsunamis, caldera collapse, fatalities, mass evacuation.
197 BC	Unknown	Central vent eruption, regional fissure eruption, submarine eruption, new island formation, explosive eruption.
31 December 46 AD	1 February 47 AD ± 30 days	Central vent eruption, regional fissure eruption, submarine eruption, new island formation, explosive eruption, lava flows, lava dome extrusion, tsunami.
15 July 726 AD ± 45 days	Unknown	Central vent eruption, regional fissure eruption, submarine eruption, new island formation, explosive eruption, lava flows, lava dome extrusion, damage.
1570	1573	Central vent eruption, regional fissure eruption, submarine eruption, new island formation, explosive eruption, lava flows, lava dome extrusion.
27 September 1650	6 December 1650	Flank (excentric) vent, regional fissure eruption, submarine eruption, new island formation, explosive eruption, lava flows, fatalities, damage, tsunami.
23 May 1707	14 September 1711	Central vent eruption, regional fissure eruption, submarine eruption, new island formation, explosive eruption, lava flows, lava dome extrusion, damage.
26 January 1866	15 October 1870	Central vent eruption, regional fissure eruption, submarine eruption, new island formation, explosive eruption, lava flows, lava dome extrusion, fatalities, damage, evacuation.
11 August 1925	17 March 1928	Central vent eruption, regional fissure eruption, explosive eruption, phreatic explosions, lava flows, lava dome extrusion.
20 August 1939	2 July 1941 ± 1 day	Central vent eruption, regional fissure eruption, submarine eruption, explosive eruption, phreatic explosions, lava flows, lava dome extrusion, damage.
10 January 1950	2 February 1950	Central vent eruption, regional fissure eruption, submarine eruption, explosive eruption, phreatic explosions, lava flows, lava dome extrusion.

In 2024, researchers identified a massive, ancient eruption of Santorini that took place roughly 520,000 years ago, which dwarfed the 1,600 BC Minoan eruption by comparison and was the largest known eruption uncovered in geologic records. The ancient eruption produced pyroclastic flows 10 times larger than those of the 2022 Hunga Tonga–Hunga Haʻapai eruption, and the eruption breached the sea surface and covered three nearby islands in volcanic deposits. The eruption also covered the seafloor with pyroclastic flows 70 kilometres (43 mi) from the volcanic vent, with pyroclastic deposits up to 150 metres (490 ft) thick and 90 cubic kilometres (22 mi^{3}) in volume, which is more than six times the volume of the pyroclastic deposits produced by the Minoan eruption.

The huge Minoan eruption of Santorini in the 17th century BC may have inspired the legend of Atlantis. It was rated 7 in the Smithsonian Global Volcanism Program's Volcanic Explosivity Index (VEI).

Although dormant, Santorini remains an active volcano. Numerous minor and medium-sized, mainly effusive, eruptions have built the dark-colored lava shields of Nea and Palea Kameni inside the caldera. Their last eruption was in 1950, and now only fumarolic activity, primarily inside the recently active craters, takes place. GPS instruments registered renewed deformation around the caldera in 2011 and 2012.

== Recent unrest ==
In July 2024, Santorini entered a new phase of volcanic unrest. Starting in mid-summer 2024, seismic activity increased significantly. The most intense volcano-tectonic seismic sequence occurred in the broader Anydros islet area, ~30 km (19 mi) to the northeast of Santorini, in late January 2025. However, low-seismicity intra-caldera unrest since early July 2024 also occurred.

Starting in the summer of 2024, slow deformation was recorded inside the Santorini caldera. From 27 January – 24 February 2025, rapid inflation was observed with up to 7 mm moving vertically and westward each day. GNSS station and satellite InSar measurements also confirmed uplift was ongoing. The intense seismic activity led to the evacuation of 11,000 people from the island. While authorities closed schools and warned against large indoor gatherings, Prime Minister Kyriakos Mitsotakis urged residents to remain calm.

Another study interpreted the unrest as a time-evolving system that transitioned from a fluid-influenced swarm into a more regular tectonic sequence. The study used a manually revised public catalog, anomaly detection, and statistical modeling of time-dependent seismicity to quantify diagnostic changes in event rate, magnitude–frequency behavior (b-value), and spatiotemporal clustering. They identify four stages:

- (1) An initial volcano-driven phase beginning in summer 2024 with slightly accelerating moment release and growing focus toward the Amorgos area.
- (2) A progressive onset in January 2025 marked by stronger clustering, a nearly steady b-value, and rapidly increasing magnitude variability was captured.
- (3) A short, intense and chaotic episode in early February 2025, when those metrics signal peak irregularity.
- (4) A post-crisis interval in which the statistics reorganize toward a more regular, tectonic-like pattern with aftershock-style behavior.

The study argues that these quantitative precursory and evolutionary patterns are operationally useful for observatories: tracking shifts in clustering, b-value stability (consistency of the b-value over time and space, which is not always stable and is influenced by factors like stress, fluids, and geological structure), and variability/entropy can help flag when a Santorini–Amorgos-type crisis is tipping from a fluids-affected swarm into a fault-controlled one, with implications for short-term hazard communication during future unrest in the area.

On June 15, 2025, a new seismic swarm was detected under Santorini. These earthquakes were small and a continuation of the seismic crisis that began in the summer of 2024. The earthquakes were mostly smaller than magnitude 3, and clustered at depths between 5–20 km along the SW–NE-oriented tectonic Kameni line, which has been the main source of magma ascent at the volcano over the past few hundred thousand years. The earthquake swarm was triggered by the movement of magma through a fault system to the northeast of Santorini. However, the earthquakes ended about three months after they began, and the magma remained more than 8 kilometres (5.0 mi) underground.

== IUGS geological heritage site ==
In respect of Santorini being "one of the largest calderas in the Mediterranean Sea formed by Plinian eruptions in a volcanic arc tectonic framework", the International Union of Geological Sciences (IUGS) included "The Quaternary Santorini Caldera" in its assemblage of 100 "geological heritage sites" around the world, in a listing published in October 2022. The organisation defines an IUGS Geological Heritage Site as "a key place with geological elements and/or processes of international scientific relevance, used as a reference, and/or with a substantial contribution to the development of geological sciences through history."

== See also ==
- List of volcanoes in Greece
- Phlegraean Fields
- Krakatoa
- Hunga Tonga–Hunga Haʻapai
- Supervolcano
