= Eschati =

Island in Christiana Islands, Greece

Native name: Εσχάτη
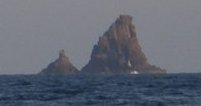
- Eschati, near Santorini, from the west
- Interactive map of Eschati

Geography
- Coordinates: 36.221177°N 25.228570°E
- Archipelago: Cyclades

Administration
- Greece
- Region: South Aegean
- Regional Unit: Thira
- Municipality: Thira

Demographics
- Population: uninhabited

Eschati (Greek: Εσχάτη, lit. 'the last one') is an uninhabited reef which is part of the volcanic Christiana Islands group, lying to the southwest of Santorini, in the Cyclades island group in Greece.
