= Vourvoulos =

Vourvoulos Βουρβούλος
- Community
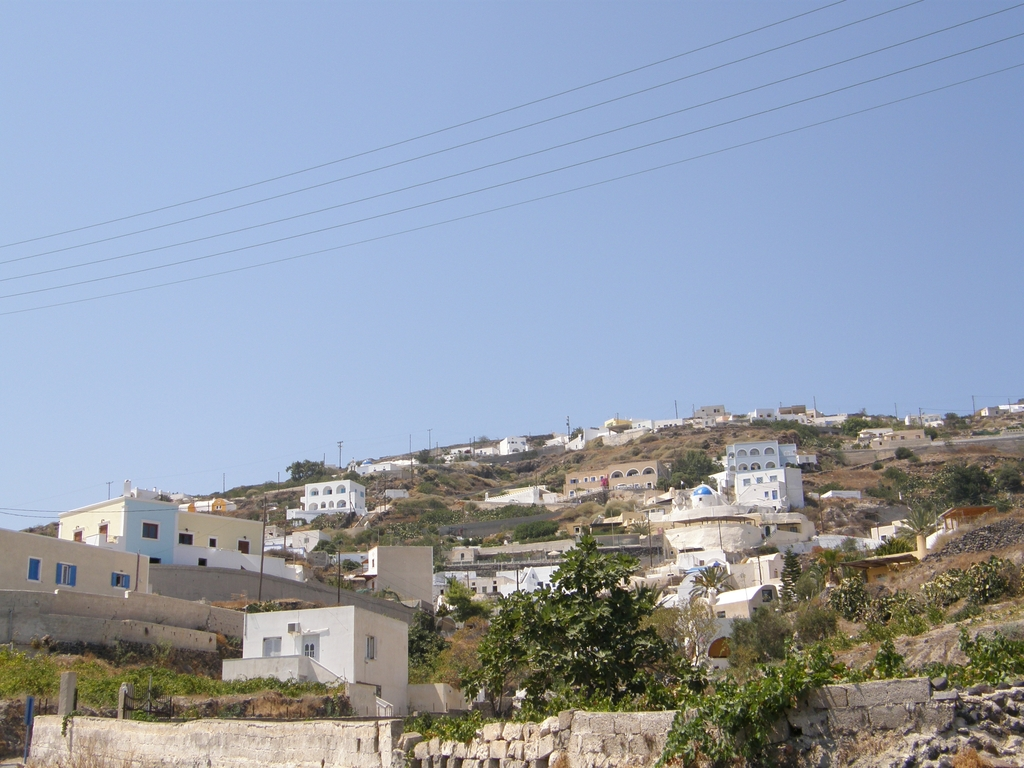

- Location within Greece
- Coordinates: 36°26′06″N 25°26′12″E
- Country: Greece
- Administrative region: South Aegean
- Regional unit: Thira
- Municipality: Thira
- Municipal unit: Thira

Population (2021)
  - Community: 591
- Time zone: UTC+2 (EET)
  - Summer (DST): UTC+3 (EEST)

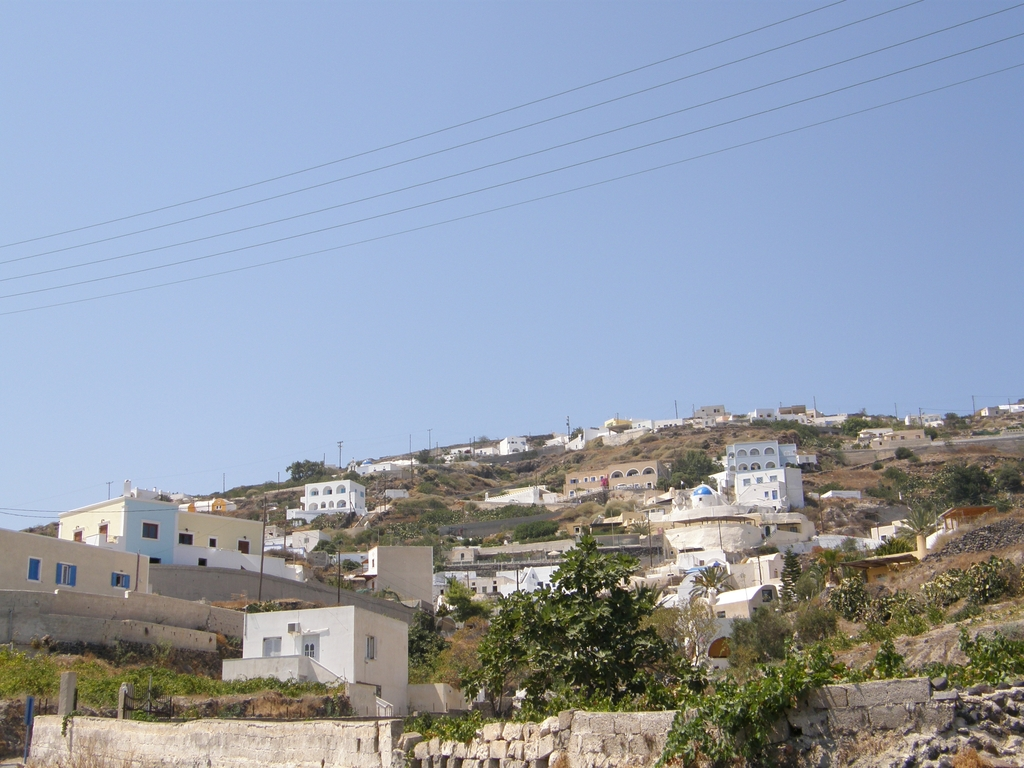
View of Vourvoulos.

Vourvoulos (Greek: Βουρβούλος) is a village on the island of Santorini in Greece. It is located 3,7 kilometers northeast of the capital Fira, built on a slope facing the east shore of the island. Vourvoulos is part of the Thira region and had 591 permanent inhabitants according to the Greek census of 2021.

A number of small beaches lie along this stretch of the east coast. The most northerly is Xiropigado, a narrow strip of pebble down a dirt track off the main east coast road. Just south is Vourvoulos beach itself, down another dirt track and a not particularly attractive strip of stone and sharp black sand.

== See also ==
- Raid on Santorini
