= Imerovigli =

Village in Santorini, Greece

Imerovigli Ημεροβίγλι
- Community
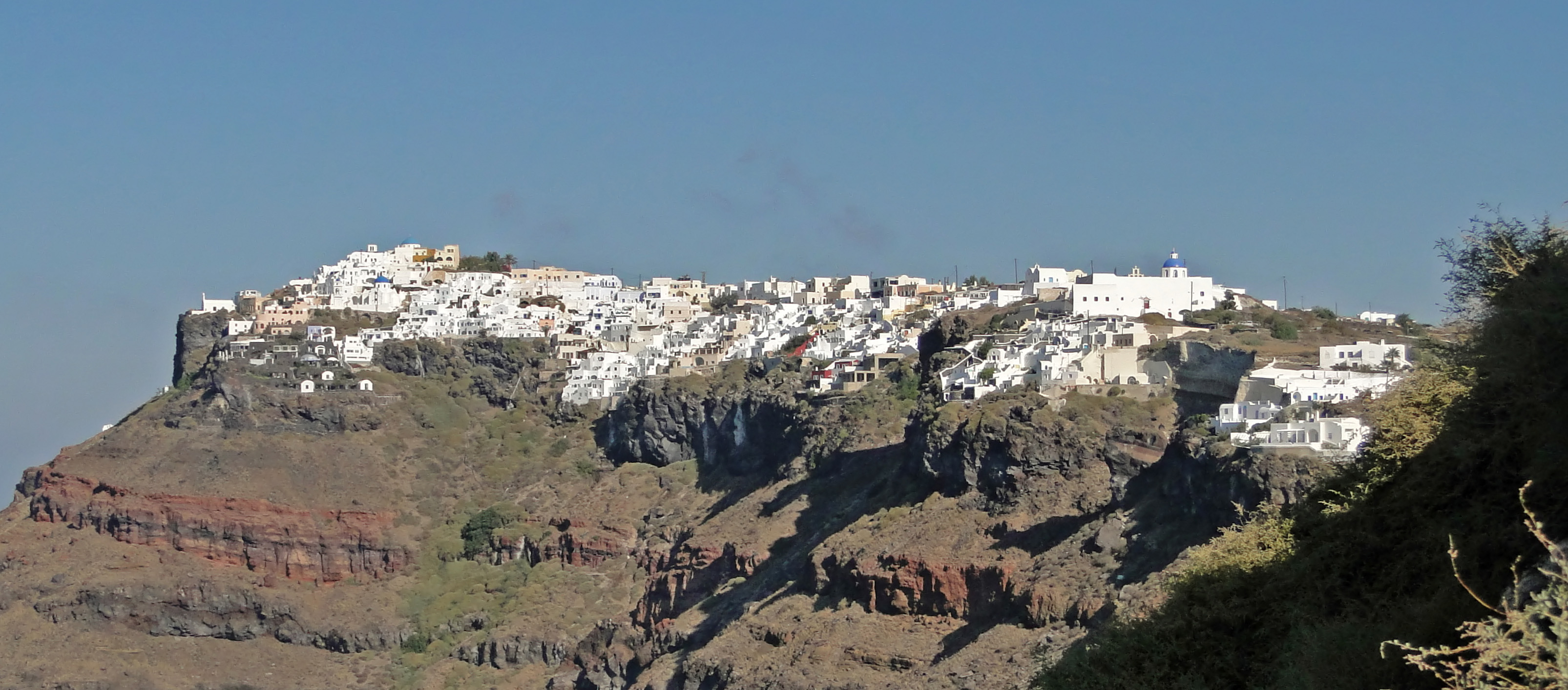
- Imerovigli seen from Fira

- Location within Greece
- Coordinates: 36°26′N 25°25′E
- Country: Greece
- Administrative region: South Aegean
- Regional unit: Thira
- Municipality: Thira
- Municipal unit: Thira

Population (2021)
  - Community: 469
- Time zone: UTC+2 (EET)
  - Summer (DST): UTC+3 (EEST)

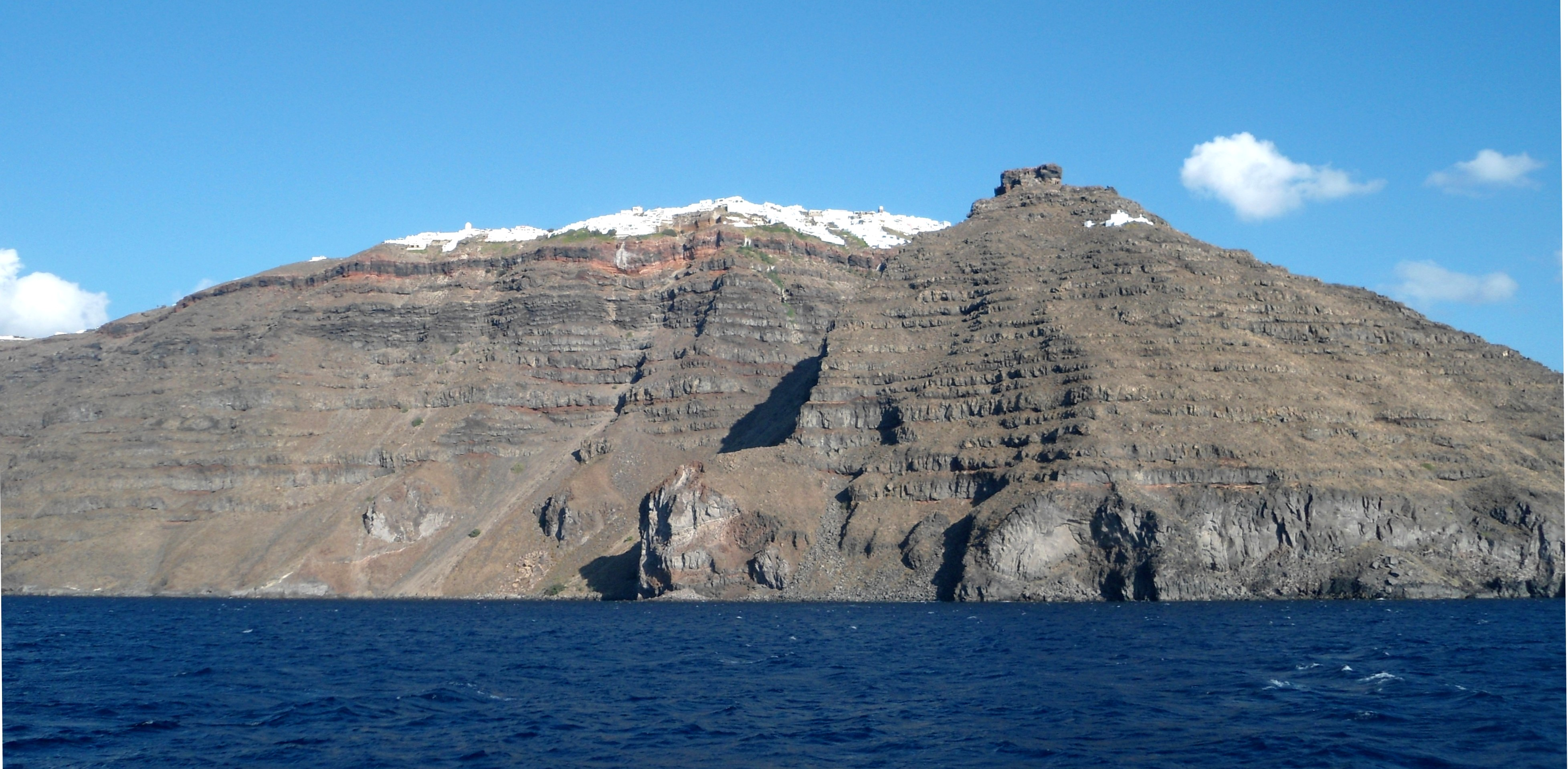
Imerovigli and Skaros rock

Imerovigli (Greek: Ημεροβίγλι) is a village on the island of Santorini, Greece, situated north of the island capital Fira. Imerovigli is built on the rim of the Santorini caldera and is crossed by narrow, paved paths.

Imerovigli's churches are all made in the Cycladic architectural style. They include the church of Ai-Stratis, in the centre of the village, and the Monastery of Saint Nikolaos, on the path connecting Imerovigli to Fira. On nearby Skaros Rock are the remains of a Venetian Castle built in 1207 by Marco Sanudo, then ruler of all the Cyclades.

Imerovigli has 469 permanent inhabitants (2021).
