= Skaros =

Ruins in Santorini

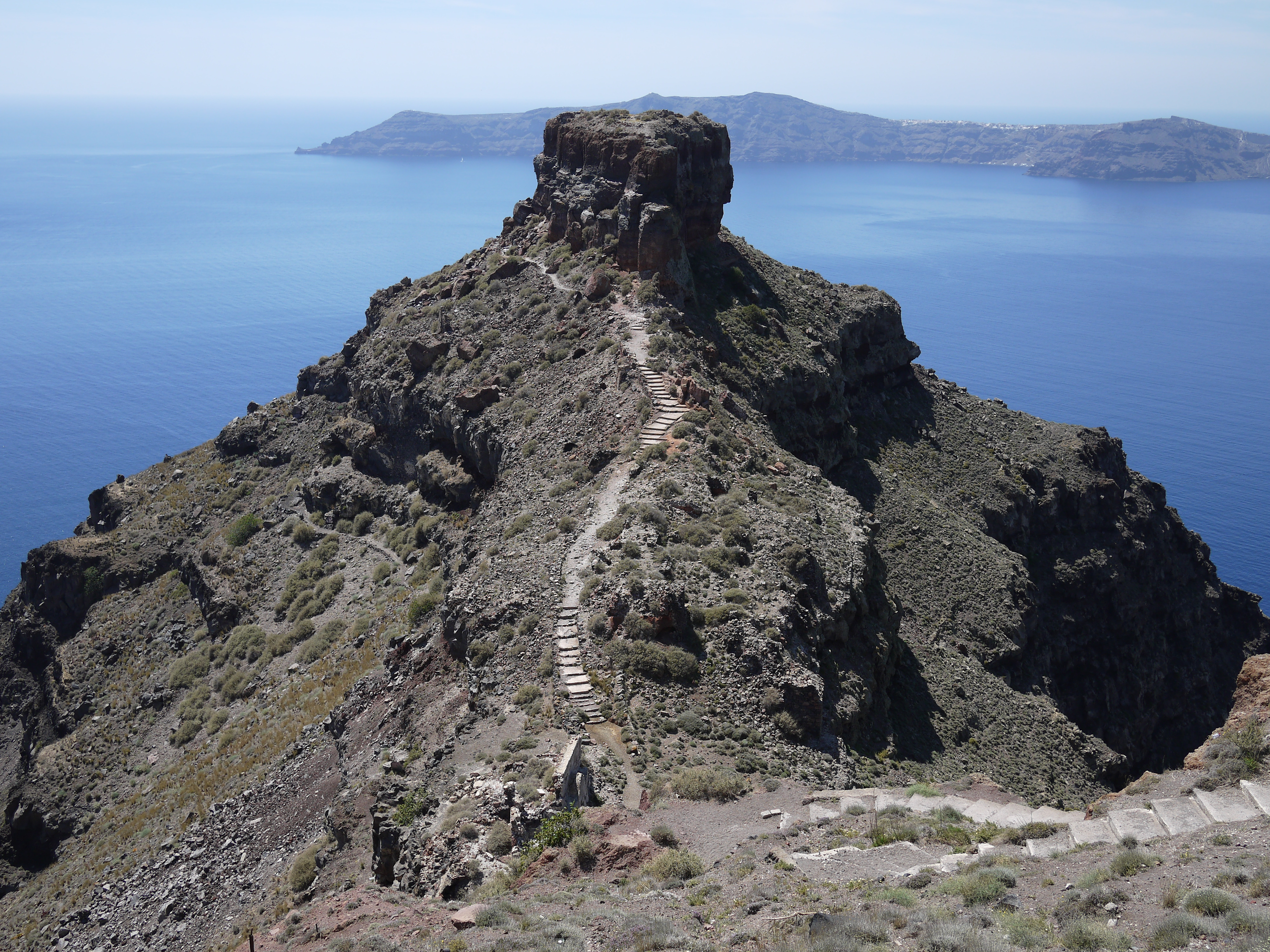
- Ruins of Skaros, a medieval fortress town on the Greek island of Santorini
- Interactive map of Skaros
- Type: Fortress, town
- Cultures: Greek, Venetian
- Location: Santorini, Greece
- Region: Aegean islands

Site notes
- Public access: Open

Skaros (Greek: Σκάρος, romanized: Skáros), also known as Skaros Rock, Fortress Skaros or Castle Skaros, is a rock formation and collection of ruins on the Greek island of Santorini.

== History ==
Skaros Rock is a large rock promontory on the Aegean island of Santorini. The formation was created through the volcanic activity (likely in an eruption dated to 68,000 B.C) of the nearby Santorini caldera, and has since been further shaped by erosion and earthquakes. In a nautical context, the formation is referred to as Cape Skaros.

A prominent landmark, the elevated position of the rock made it a preferable location for defensive fortifications. The site was initially fortified in the early 13th century by the Byzantine Empire, which employed Venetian architect Giacomo Barozzi to construct a fortress around the promontory. The initial structure, known as "La Roka" ("Upper Castle" in Greek), was completed in 1207. Upon the fortress' completion, Barozzi was given control of Santorini by fellow Venetian Marco I Sanudo, who had recently coerced the Byzantines into surrendering their claim to the Aegean islands and had named himself Duke of Naxos. The settlement subsequently grew, with many homes, businesses, and further fortifications being built around the promontory. A church complex, the Chapel of Panagia Theoskepasti, was built at the base of the formation, as was a small harbor. By the time of the Venetian Republic's takeover of Santorini in 1336, the settlement consisted of over 200 homes and had several hundred inhabitants. As Skaros was the largest settlement on the island, the fortress became the de facto capitol of Venetian Santorini.

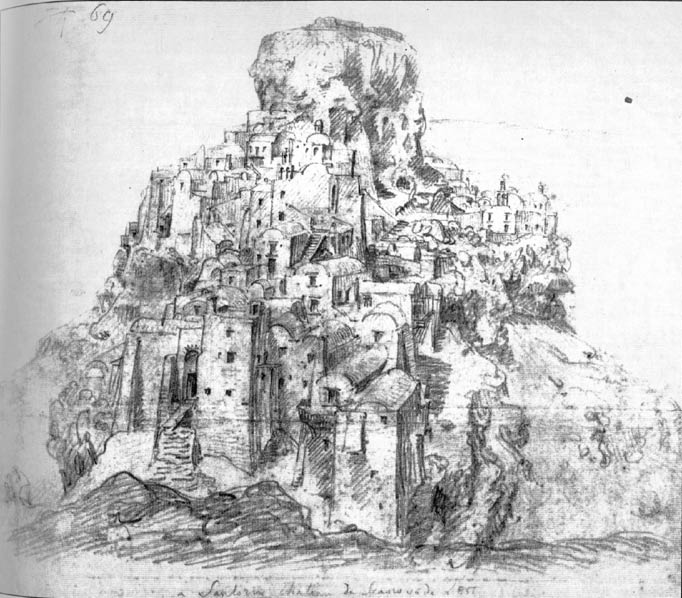
Skaros as seen in a sketch by Thomas Hope dating to the 1790s

A series of escalating wars between the Ottoman Empire and Venice in the mid 16th century resulted in Santorini being the target of numerous raids by the Ottomans. While other settlements suffered, Skaros' fortifications and position high on the cliffs of Western Santorini protected the town from raiders. However, the island's trade-based economy suffered, resulting in the ruling families of Santorini severing ties with Venice and signing a non-aggression treaty with the Ottomans. This policy change angered Venice, which attempted to recover the island without success. In addition to Venetian incursions, some Ottoman captains continued to raid the island for slaves and supplies in violation of the Turko-Santorinian treaty, while the rise of the Tunisia-based Barbary pirates also proved to be a major threat to the island. Despite these risks, Santorini maintained its independence until 1566, when Ottoman admiral Piali Pasha arrived off of the island with a large fleet, demanding the full annexation of the island into the Ottoman Empire. All of the island's settlements, including Skaros, accepted these terms, and the island became an Ottoman possession. The Ottomans left a garrison force in Skaros, and after the Ottoman takeover the threat posed by Muslim piracy abated. Without the threat of raids to keep rival settlements in check, Skaros was eclipsed in importance by the towns of Fira (which became the new capital of the island) and Oia.

Though already in decline, Skaros remained a prominent settlement until the Santorini volcano became active and began to erupt in 1650. This eruption caused several strong earthquakes which collapsed part of the town into the sea. The volcano continued to go through periods of activity, erupting from 1701 to 1711 and again from 1866 to 1870. The 18th century eruptions were notably impactful, as they caused most of Skaros' residents to move to Fira or the nearby village of Imerovigli. The old Venetian fortress subsequently fell into disuse, and by the early 19th century consisted of only a few weathered ruins.

=== Present day ===
The ruins of Skaros are currently a popular destination for hiking and photography; the promontory is accessible via the nearby village of Imerovigli. A monastery, known as the Chapel of Panagia Theoskepasti, remains in use on the cliffs below the rock feature.
