= Aspronisi =

Small island near Crete

Nickname: "White Island"
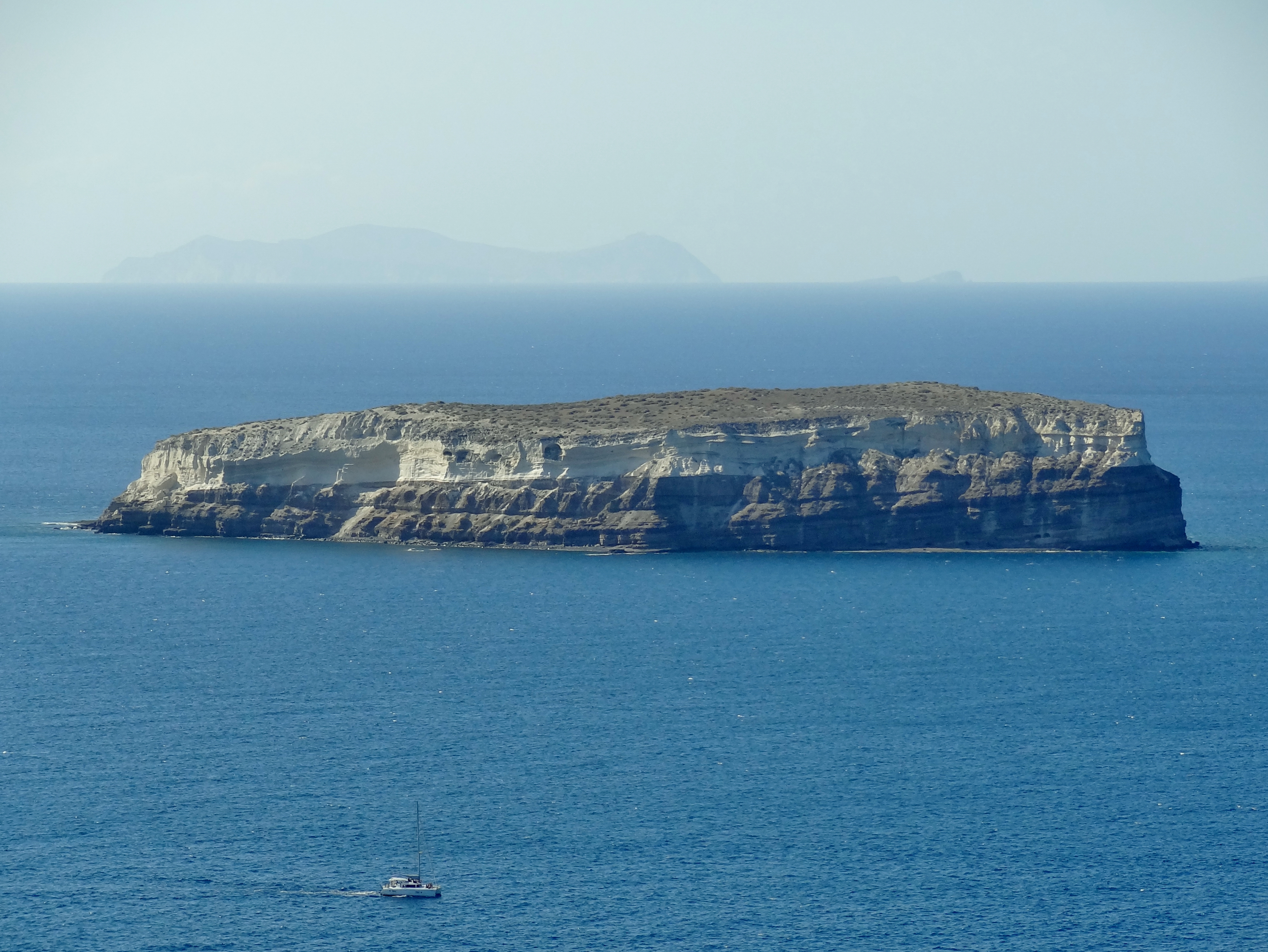
- Photo of Aspronisi. The contrast between lighter pumice and darker volcanic rock can be seen.

- Location in Greece

Geography
- Location: Mediterranean Sea
- Coordinates: 36°23′00″N 25°20′52″E
- Total islands: 1
- Area: 0.14 km^{2} (0.054 sq mi)

Administration
- Greece

Aspronisi (Greek: Ασπρονήσι) is an uninhabited island lying within the Santorini caldera. The island was originally formed by the massive Minoan eruption in the 2nd millennium BC, after which it was gradually built up by successive volcanic activity. The name Aspronisi, which means 'White Island' in Greek, is derived from the island being partially composed of white pumice.

== Formation ==
Aspronisi was formed through the gradual volcanic activity in Santorini caldera, which itself is composed of four distinct shield volcanoes. The island was formed along with the current Santorini caldera during a massive eruption in the 2nd millennium BC that expelled 14 cubic miles (60 km^{3} ) of dense rock. Aspronisi was briefly a submarine volcano before the force of the eruption pushed the islet above the surface, after which dense layers of pumice and tephra ejected from the volcano covered the island. These deposits eventually solidified into the pale white deposits that give Aspronisi its moniker of the "White Isle". The base of the island is composed of black lava rock, and the island is connected to the larger islands of Therasia and Santorini by the submerged outer edge of Santorini caldera.

=== Geography ===
The island has an area of 0.14 square kilometers. Its dimensions are 650 meters long by 200 meters wide. The island is dominated by steep cliffs, making landings difficult, though two pebble beaches and a small anchorage exist on the islet. The top of the island takes the form of a flat plateau.

=== Habitation ===
Aspronisi is currently uninhabited, though sparse plant life can be found on the island. The island is a nesting ground for some species of migratory birds.

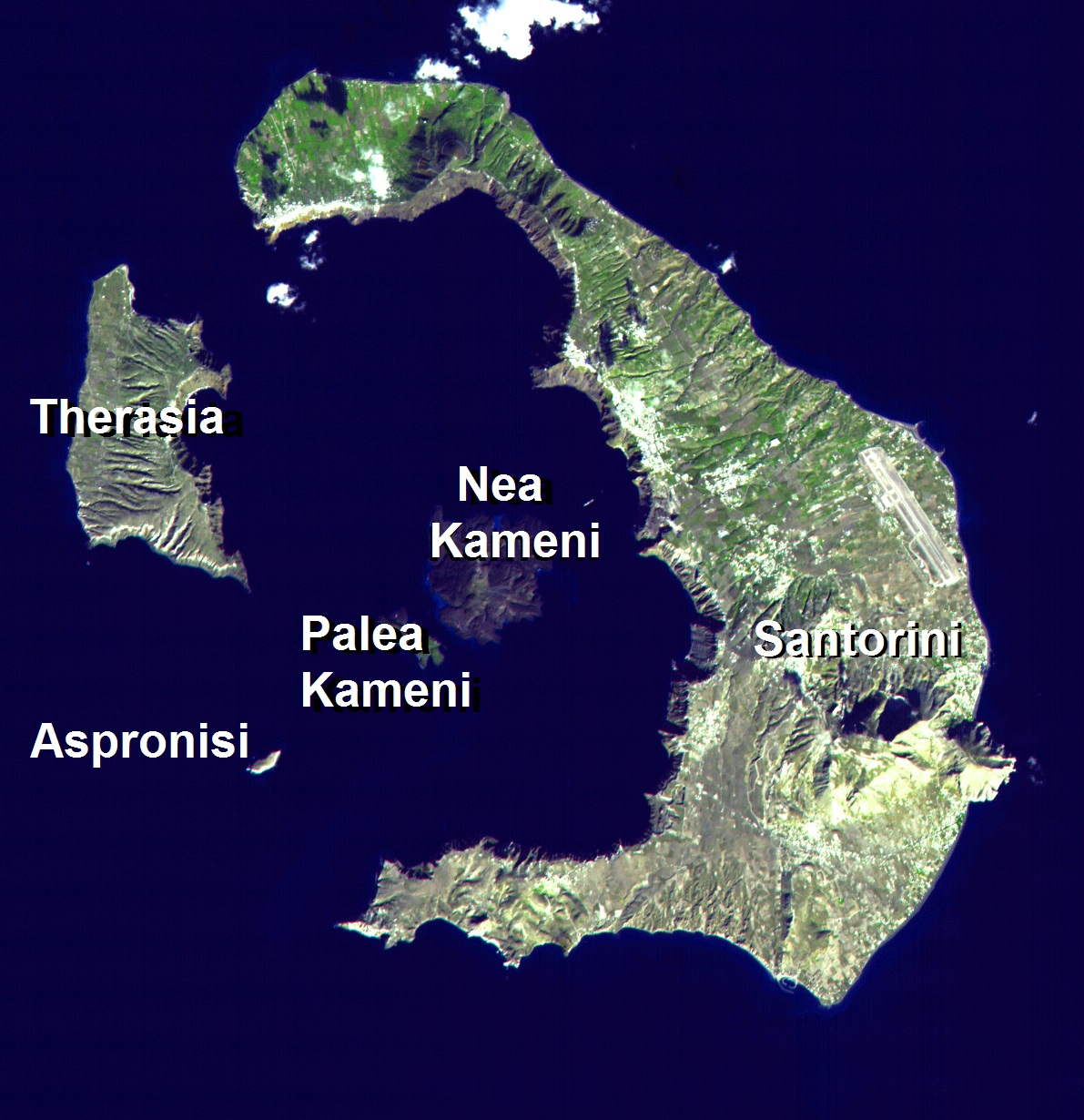
Labeled map of the Santorini archipelago. Aspronisi can be seen in the channel between Therasia and Santorini
