= Christiana Islands =

Group of islands in the Cyclades, Greece

Christiana
Native name: Χριστιανά
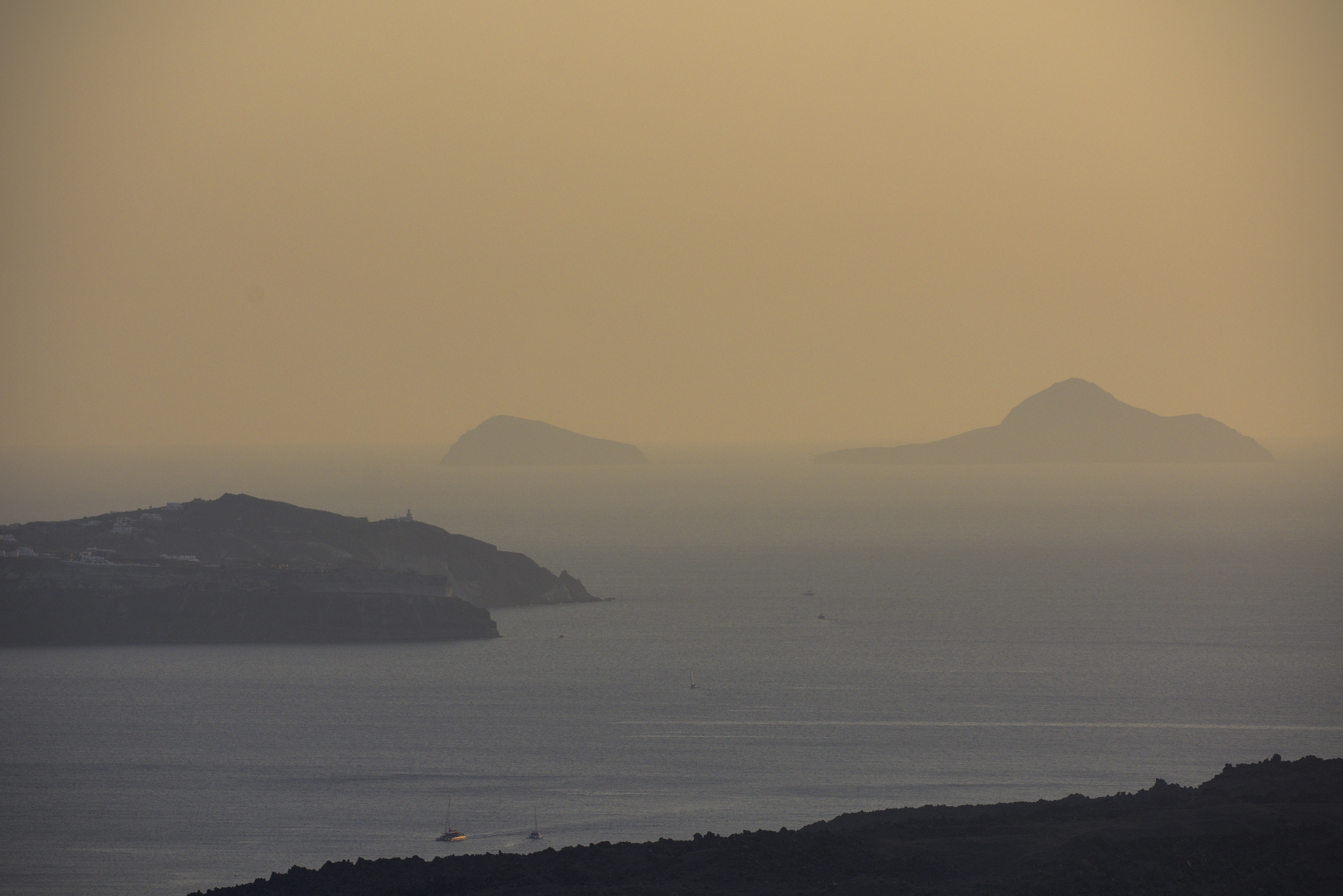
- The Christiana Islands viewed from Santorini. The Kameni Islands are in the front and Cape Akrotiri on the left side. Askania is on the left and Christiani on the right.
- Interactive map of Christiana

Geography
- Location: Aegean Sea
- Coordinates: 36°15′N 25°12′E
- Archipelago: Cyclades
- Total islands: 3
- Area: 2.35 km^{2} (0.91 sq mi)

Administration
- Greece
- Region: South Aegean
- Regional unit: Thira
- Municipality: Thira

Demographics
- Population: Uninhabited

Christiana (Greek: Χριστιανά) is a group of three volcanic Greek islands in the Cyclades, in the Aegean Sea.

The group is located about 16 km (10 miles) southwest of Santorini and is made up of the islands Christiani (Χριστιανή, the largest one), Eschati (Εσχάτη) and Askania (Ασκανιά), belonging to the same submarine volcanic edifice, which is assumed to have been dormant since the Early Pleistocene. The islands' area is about 2.35 km^{2}.

All three islands are now uninhabited, but on Christiani there are remains of human settlement dating back to Neolithic times. The Christiana islands have been uninhabited since the 1890s and have remained unfarmed since then. As a result, artificial pesticides and fertilizers are absent from this ecosystem. In the mid-1970s, the largest island, Christiani, was considered by NATO as a military base intended to host a missile silo, but this never came to pass. These islands are privately owned and public access is restricted.
