= Manolito =

Manolito is a diminutive form of the Spanish given name Manolo, in turn a diminutive of Manuel. It may refer to:

== People ==
- Ramón Antonio "Manolito" Ramírez (born 1974), Dominican politician and businessman
- Manolito "Lito" Tolentino Mayo (1954–1983), Filipino artist and professor

== Fictional characters ==
- Manuel "Manolito" Goreiro, a character in the Mafalda universe by Argentine cartoonist Quino
- Manolito Gafotas, the main character in a series of children's books by Spanish author Elvira Lindo
  - Manolito Four Eyes, a 1999 comedy film based on the character
- Manolito Montoya, a character on the US TV series The High Chaparral

== Other uses ==
- Manolito y su Trabuco, a Cuban salsa band

== See also ==
- Manolita
- Manolo
