= Manolas =

Manolas (Greek: Μανωλάς) may refer to:

== People ==
- Christos Manolas (born 1959), Greek army officer
- Konstantinos "Kostas" Manolas (born 1991), Greek footballer
- Konstantinos Manolas (footballer, born 1993), Greek footballer
- Stelios Manolas (born 1961), Greek footballer

== Settlements ==
- Manolas, Thirasia, a village in Greece
- Manolas, Vouprasia, a village in Greece
- Nea Manolas, Vouprasia, a village in Greece

== See also ==
- Manola
