= Manola =

Manola may refer to:

== People ==
- Another name for maja, a stereotypical traditional Spanish woman

=== Given name ===
- Manola Asensio (born 1943), Swiss ballet dancer
- Manola Brunet (born 1955), Spanish geographer and climatologist
- Manola Robles (1948–2021), Chilean journalist
- Manola Saavedra (1936–2012), Spanish-Mexican actress
- Manola Zabalza (born 1995), Mexican politician

=== Surname ===
- Marion Manola (1865–1914), American comic opera singer and actress
- Petar Manola (1918–2004), Yugoslav footballer

== Other uses ==
- Manola (fly), a genus of tachinid flies
- Manola, Alberta, a hamlet in Alberta, Canada
- The name of an English translation of the comic opera Le Jour et la Nuit
- SS Manola, a shipwrecked ship

== See also ==
- Manolas
- Manolita
- Manolo
