= Zabalza (disambiguation) =

Zabalza is a town and municipality located in the province and autonomous community of Navarre, northern Spain. It may also refer to:

- Jorge Zabalza (born 1943), Uruguayan politician and former guerrilla fighter
- José María Zabalza (1928–1985), Spanish screenwriter and film director
- Manola Zabalza (born 1995), Mexican politician
- Miguel Zabalza (1896 – 1925), Spanish fencer
- Pedro Zabalza Arrospide (1913 - 1996), Uruguayan lawyer, rancher, and politician
- Pedro María Zabalza (born 1944), Spanish former football midfielder and manager
