= Amoudi Bay =

Bay in Santorini, Greece

Coordinates: 36°27′36″N 25°22′14″E

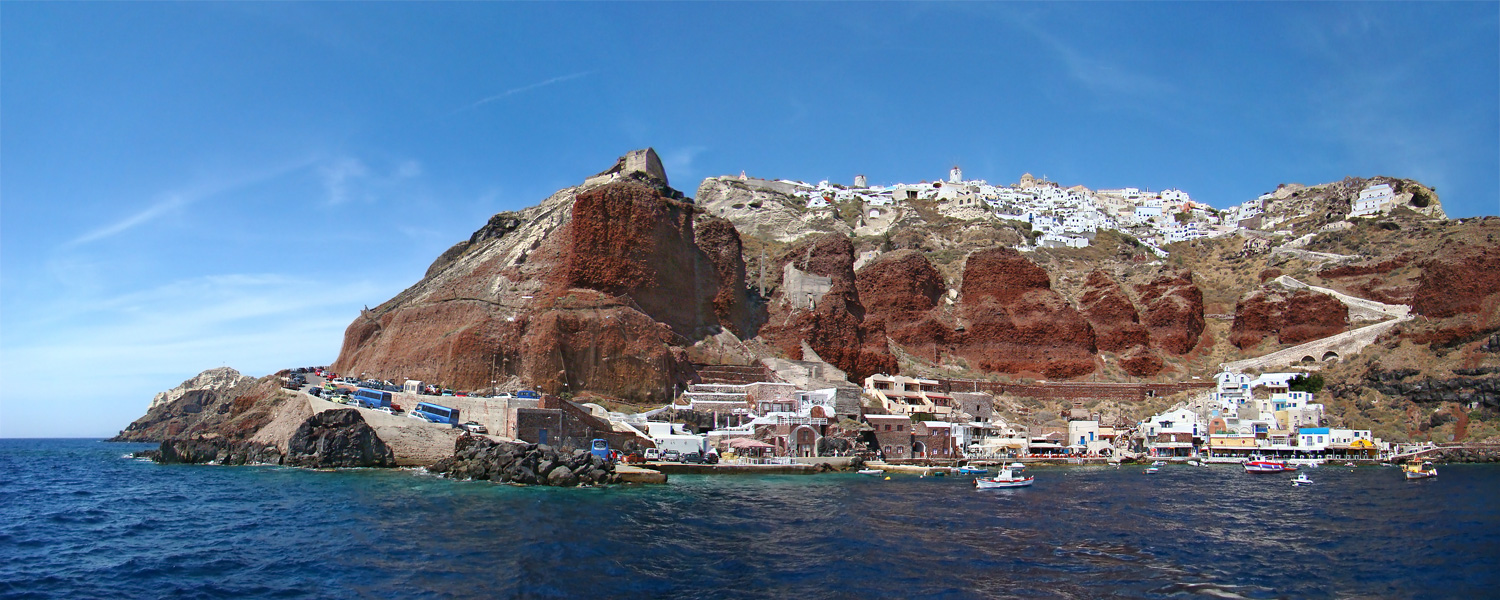
Amoudi Bay on the Greek island of Santorini

Amoudi Bay is a bay on the Greek Island of Santorini. The feature is set into the high volcanic cliffs of western Santorini below the town of Oia.

== Description ==
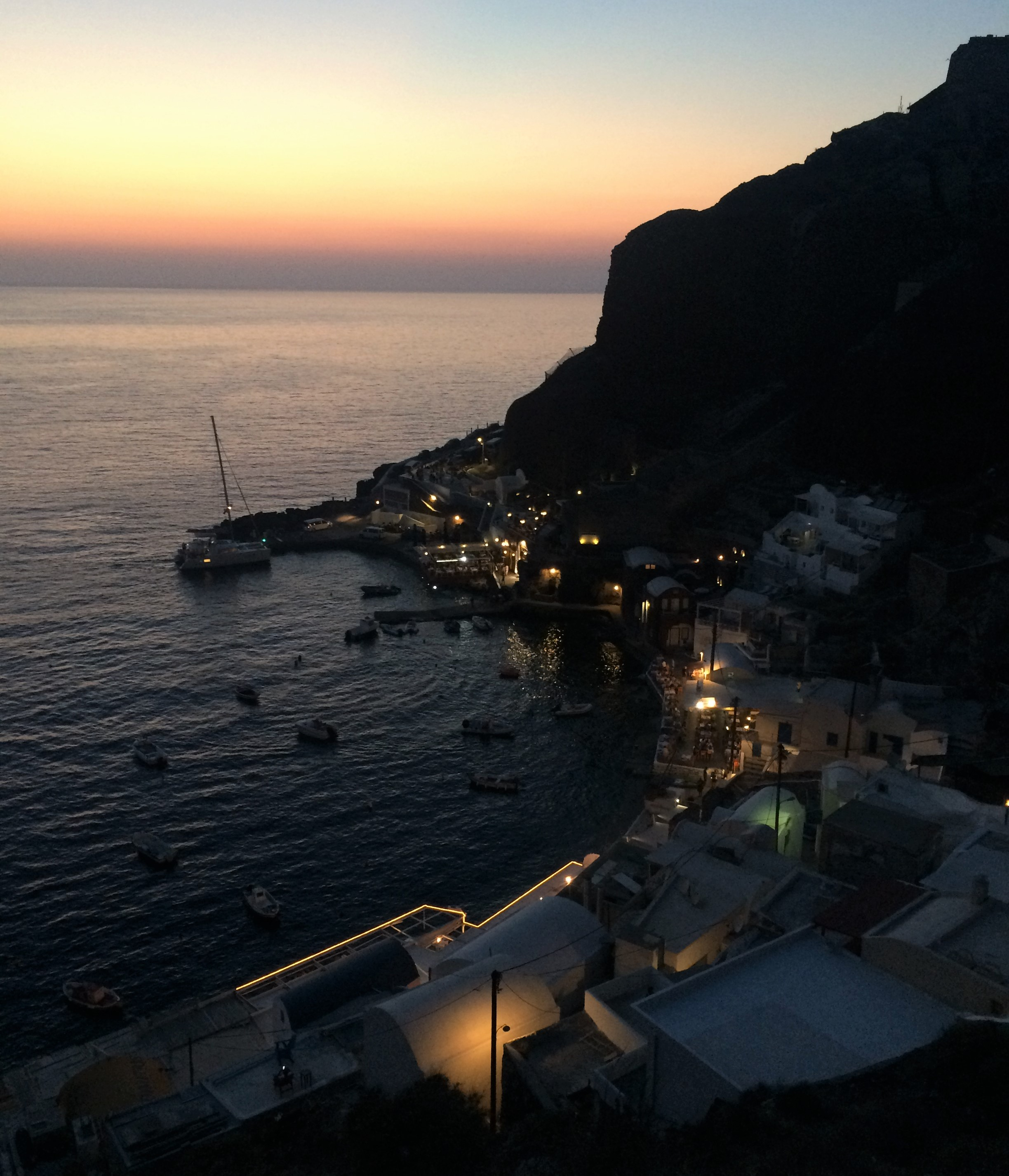
Amoudi Bay at dusk

The bay is a well known site on the island, and is often cited as an excellent location for viewing the sunset. The bay is also known for the 200 steps leading from the base of the feature to the town of Oia on the cliffs above. Due to the locale's importance to local tourism, the base of the bay's cliffs is dotted with buildings belonging to the village of Ormos Armeni, and many sailing tours use Amoudi as their staging point.
