= Manolas, Thirasia =

Manolas Μανωλάς
- Settlement
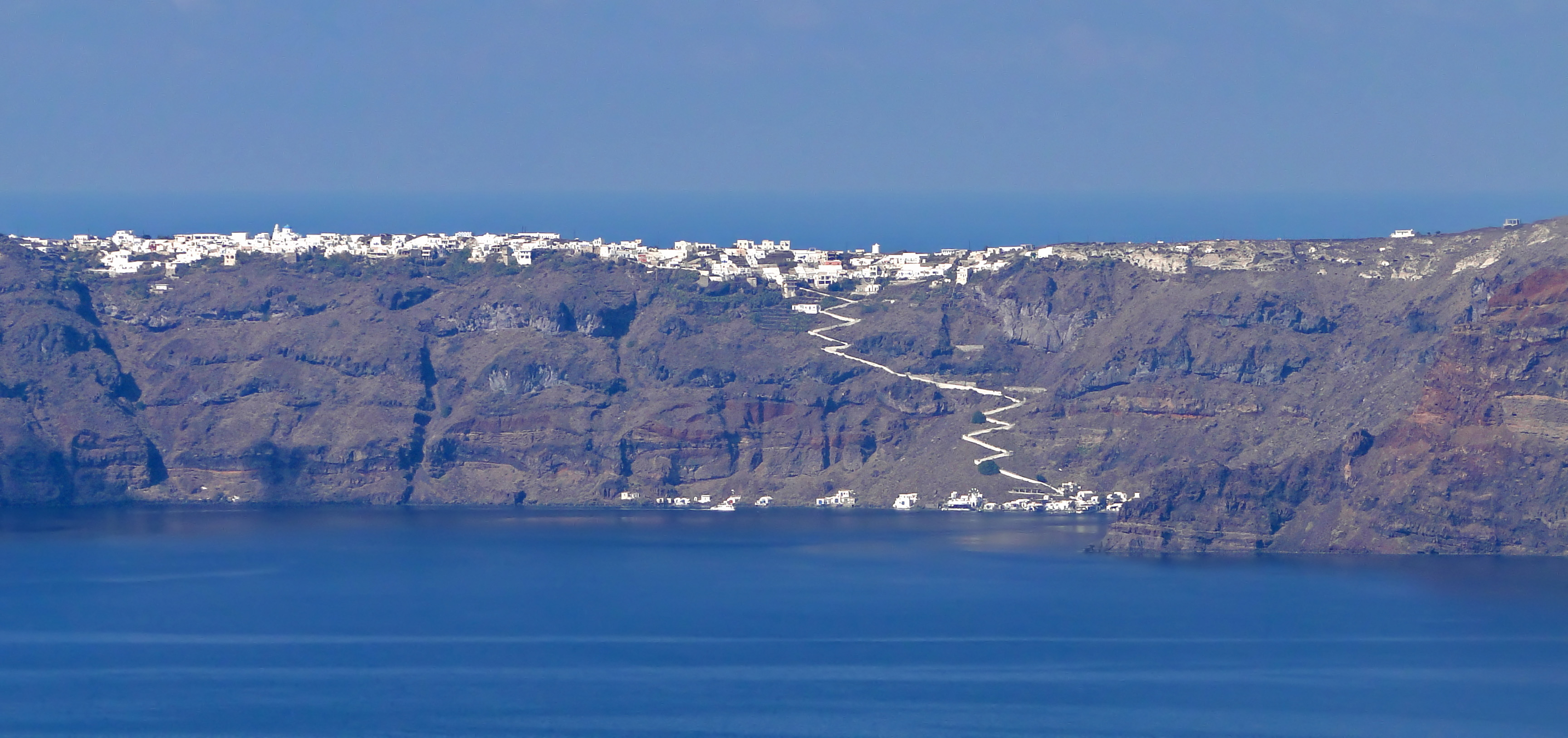
- General view of Manolas

- Location within Greece
- Coordinates: 36°28′N 24°21′E
- Country: Greece
- Administrative region: South Aegean
- Regional unit: Thira
- Municipality: Thira
- Municipal unit: Oia
- Community: Thirasia

Population (2021)
  - Total: 140
- Time zone: UTC+2 (EET)
  - Summer (DST): UTC+3 (EEST)
- Vehicle registration: EM

Manolas (Greek: Μανωλάς, also Θηρασία - Thirasia) is the main settlement and the capital of Therasia, the small island opposite to Santorini (Thera). It is located in the east of island, above the abrupt Santorini caldera. It has a beautiful view of the volcano and the main settlements of Santorini such as Fira, Imerovigli, Oia, etc. Manolas can be approached either by road from the port of Riva or the uphill path from the small port of Korfos. Donkeys are the main mode of transport on this path. Manolas has a population of 140 inhabitants according to the 2021 census. It belongs to Thira municipality and Oia municipal unit.

== Historical population ==
Census	Settlement
1991	142
2001	147
2011	160

== Places of interest ==
Manolas is a traditional Cycladic village with small, cubic houses, white walls and narrow streets. The settlement is located at the top of the island and it has a clear view of the caldera. A notable building in the region is the Church of Saint Constantine, built in 1874. A route around the village is the stone uphill path that joins Manolas with the small port of Corfu. Near the village is the uninhabited settlement Kera and the traditional Cycladic monastery of Panagia Trypiti or Kera, which is located 3 km south of Manolas.
