= Menalo =

Menalo is a Bosnian and Croatian surname. Notable people with this surname include:

- Leo Menalo (born 2002), Croatian basketball player
- Luka Menalo (born 1996), Bosnian footballer
- Pero Menalo (born 1989), Croatian footballer

== See also ==
- Manalo
- Manolo
