= Therasia =

Greek island of the Cyclades in the Aegean Sea

Native name: Θηρασία
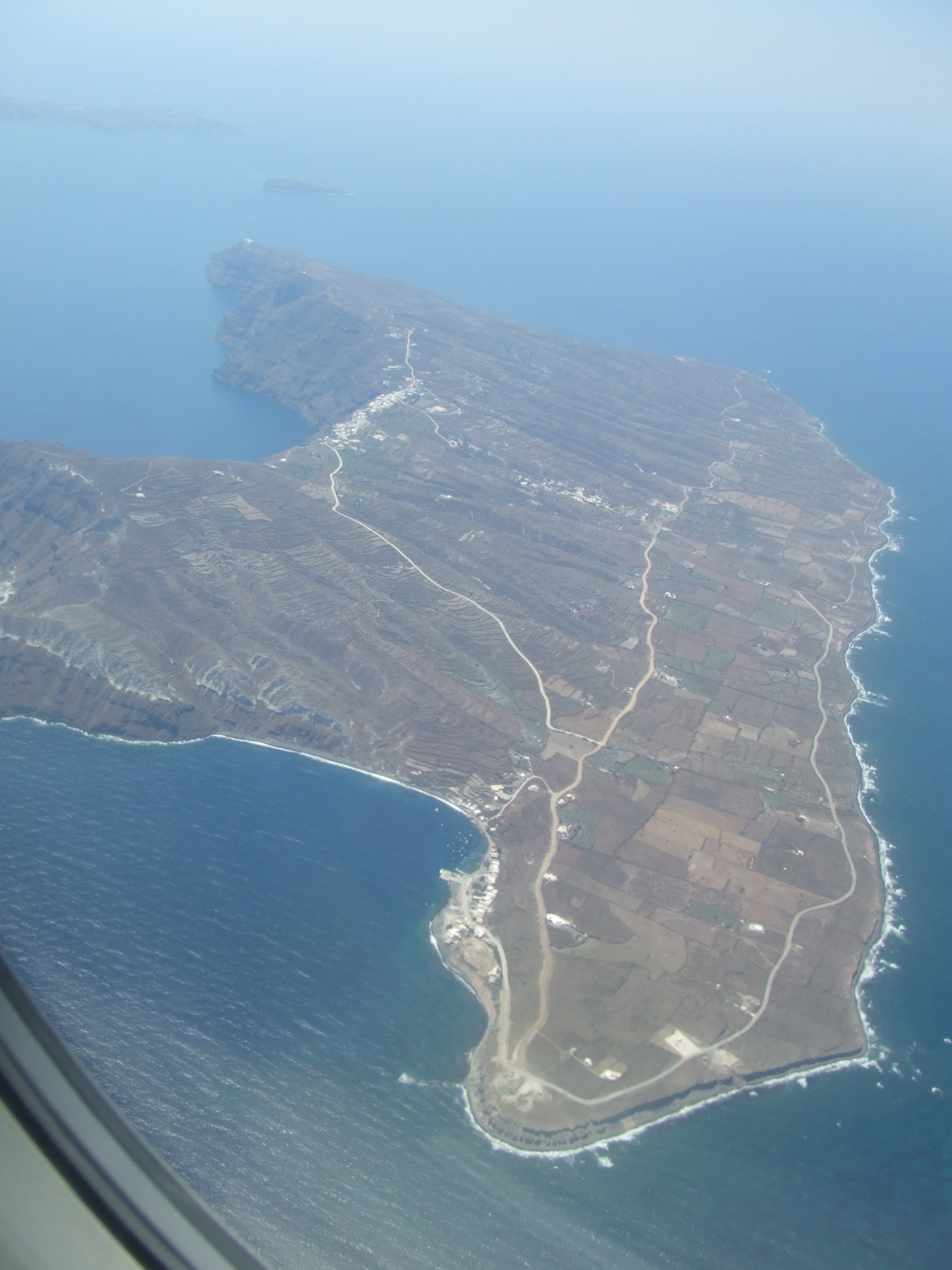

- Location within Greece

Geography
- Coordinates: 36.43°N 25.33°E
- Archipelago: Cyclades
- Area: 9.3 km^{2} (3.6 sq mi)

Administration
- Greece
- Region: South Aegean
- Regional unit: Thira
- Municipality: Thira

Demographics
- Population: 249 (2021)
- Pop. density: 34/km^{2} (88/sq mi)

Additional information
- Postal code: 847 02
- Area code: 22860
- Vehicle registration: EM

Therasia, also known as Thirasía (Greek: Θηρασία), is an island in the volcanic island group of Santorini in the Greek Cyclades. It lies north-west of Nea Kameni, a small island formed in recent centuries by volcanic activity and thus marking the centre of the island group. Therasia is the second largest island of the group, the largest by far being Thera.

Therasia has a land area of 9.299 square kilometres (3.590 sq mi) and its population was 249 inhabitants at the 2021 census. It is part of the municipal unit of Oia (Δημοτική Ενότητα Οίας).

Thera and Therasia were separated by the Thera eruption.

== Villages ==
- Agía Eiríni (pop. 28 in 2021)
- Agrilia (5)
- Manolas (140)
- Ormos Korfou (2)
- Potamos (74)

== Historical population ==
Census	Community
1991	233
2001	268
2011	319
2021	249
