= Manolita =

Manolita is a diminutive form of the Spanish given name Manola, in turn a diminutive of Manuela. Notable people with the name include:

- Manolita Arriola (1919–2004), Mexican singer and actress
- Manolita Cinco (born 1932), Filipina hurdler
- Manolita Piña (1883–1994), Spanish-Uruguayan pianist and painter
- Manolita Saval (1914–2001), Spanish actress and singer

== See also ==
- Manola
- Manolito
