= Manalo =

Manalo is a Tagalog-language surname meaning "to win". It may also be a rare Catalan surname as Manaló, derived from a variant of Maneló, which is a pet form of the personal name Manel and a short form of Emanuel. Notable people with the surname include:

== Iglesia ni Cristo ==
- Felix Manalo (1886–1963), founder of the Iglesia ni Cristo organization, Executive Minister from 1914 to 1963
  - Tomasa Manalo, first wife of Felix Manalo
  - Pilar Manalo Danao (1914–1987), Head Choir Director from 1942 to 1987
  - Eraño G. Manalo (1925–2009), Executive Minister of the Iglesia ni Cristo from 1963 to 2009
    - Tenny Manalo (born 1937), widow of Eraño Manalo, involved in the 2015 Iglesia ni Cristo leadership controversy
    - Eduardo V. Manalo (born 1955), current Executive Minister of the Iglesia ni Cristo
  - Bienvenido Manalo (born 1935), head of the Engineering and Construction Department

== Others with the surname ==
- Ahtisa Manalo (born 1997), Filipina model, 2018 Binibining Pilipinas International winner, and Miss International 2018 1st Runner-Up.
- Bianca Manalo (born 1987), Filipina actress and 2009 Binibining Pilipinas-Universe winner
- Cardozo Manalo Luna, 35th Vice Chief of Staff of the Armed Forces of the Philippines
- Chelsea Manalo (born 1999), Filipina beauty pageant titleholder
- Enrique Manalo (born 1952) Ambassador of the Philippines
- Jay Manalo (born 1973), Filipino actor
- John Manalo (born 1995), Filipino actor
- Jose Manalo (born 1966), Filipino actor and comedian
- Marlon Manalo (born 1975), Filipino pool player
- Rosario Manalo (born 1935) Ambassador of the Philippines and Academic
- Victoria Manalo Draves (born 1924), American competition diver

== See also ==
- Manolo
- Menalo
