= Oia, Greece =

Village in Santorini, Greece

Oia Pano Meria Οία
- Municipal unit
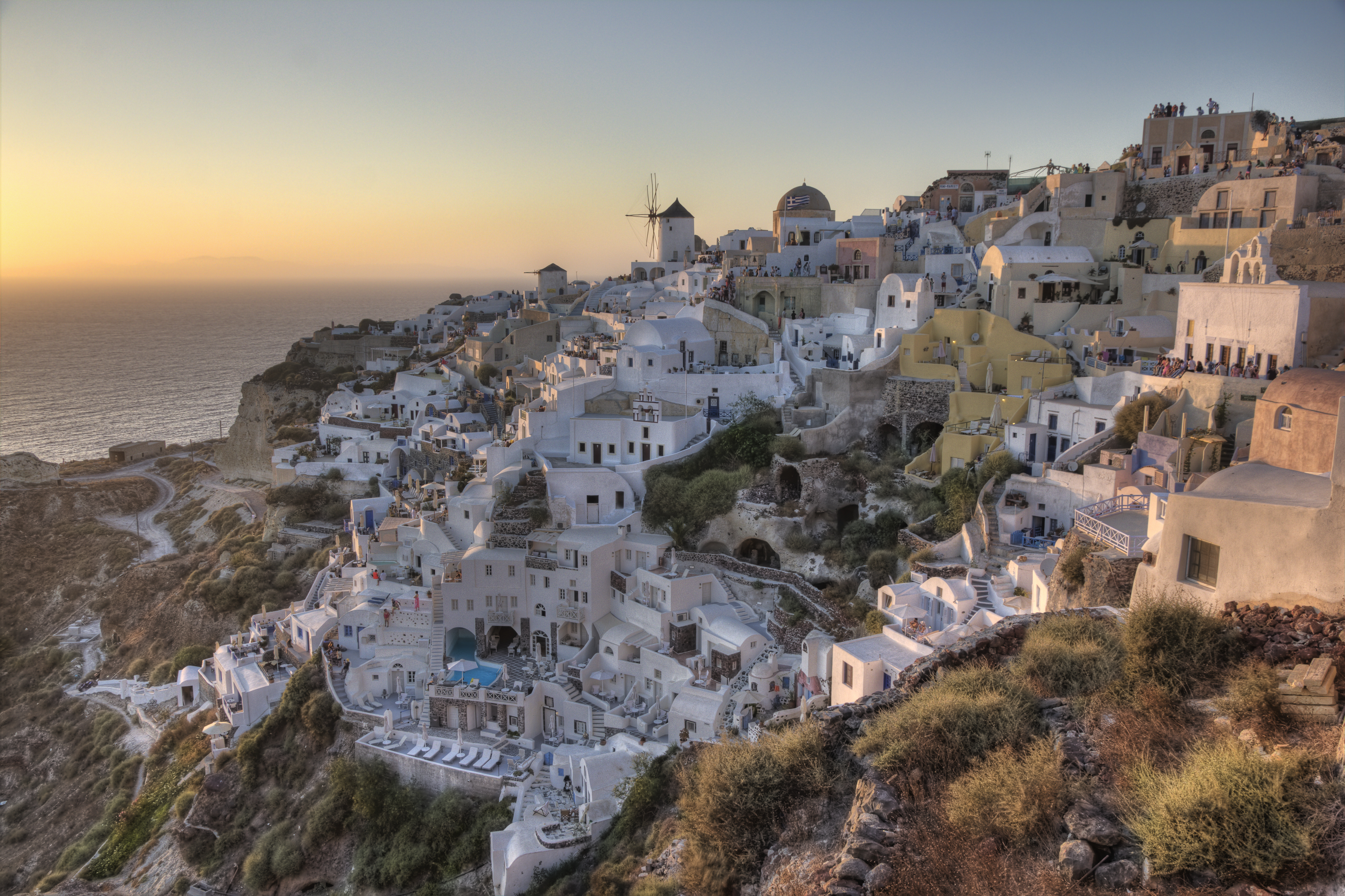
- Oia at sunset

- Seal

- Location within the regional unit

- Location within Greece
- Coordinates: 36°28′N 25°22′E
- Country: Greece
- Administrative region: South Aegean
- Regional unit: Thira
- Municipality: Santorini

Area
  - Municipal unit: 19.4 km^{2} (7.5 sq mi)

Population (2021)
  - Municipal unit: 1,087
  - Municipal unit density: 56.0/km^{2} (145/sq mi)
  - Community: 838
- Time zone: UTC+2 (EET)
  - Summer (DST): UTC+3 (EEST)
- Vehicle registration: EM

Oia or Ia (Greek: Οία, romanized: Oía, pronounced [ˈia]) is a small village and former community in the South Aegean on the islands of Thira (Santorini) and Therasia, in the Cyclades, Greece. Since the 2011 local government reform, it has been part of the municipality of Santorini, of which it is a municipal unit. It covers the whole island of Therasia and the northwesternmost part of Santorini, which it shares with the municipal unit of Santorini. The main street is named Nikolaou Nomikou. The population was 1,087 inhabitants at the 2021 census, and the land area is 19.449 km^{2}.

Oia was previously known as Apano Meria (Απάνω Μεριά or Επάνω Μεριά, "upper side"). This name still occurs locally as Pano Meria, and the inhabitants are still called Apanomerites (Απανωμερίτες). The Ancient Greek Oia was one of the two harbours of ancient Thera and was located in the southeast of the island, where Kamari is now.

Oia reached the peak of prosperity in the late 19th and early 20th centuries. Its economic prosperity was based on its merchant fleet, which plied trade in the Eastern Mediterranean, especially from Alexandria to Russia. The two-story captains' houses built on the highest part of the village are a reminder of the village's former affluence. The 1956 earthquake destroyed part of the town.

== History ==
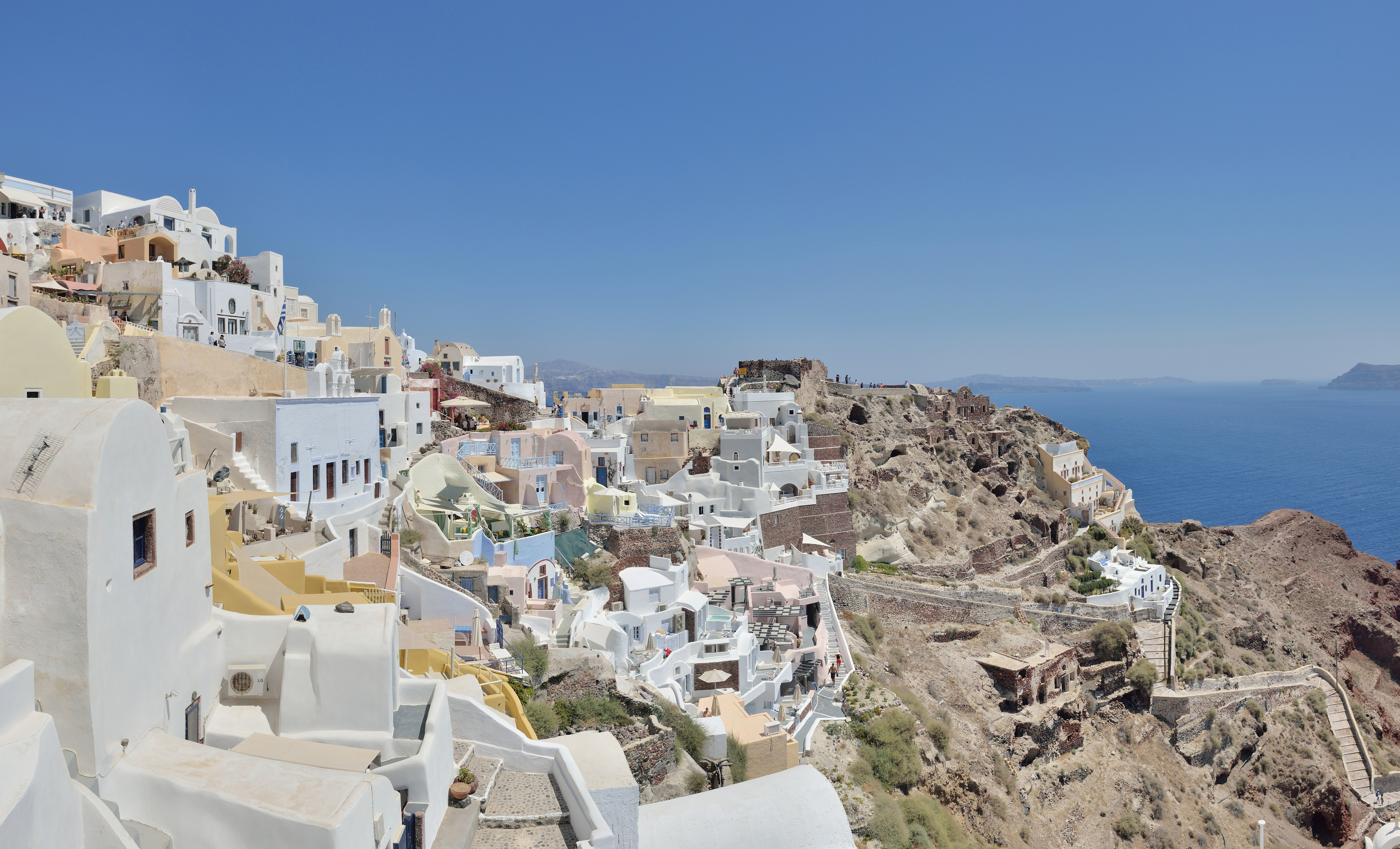
View of the village towards the Byzantine castle ruins

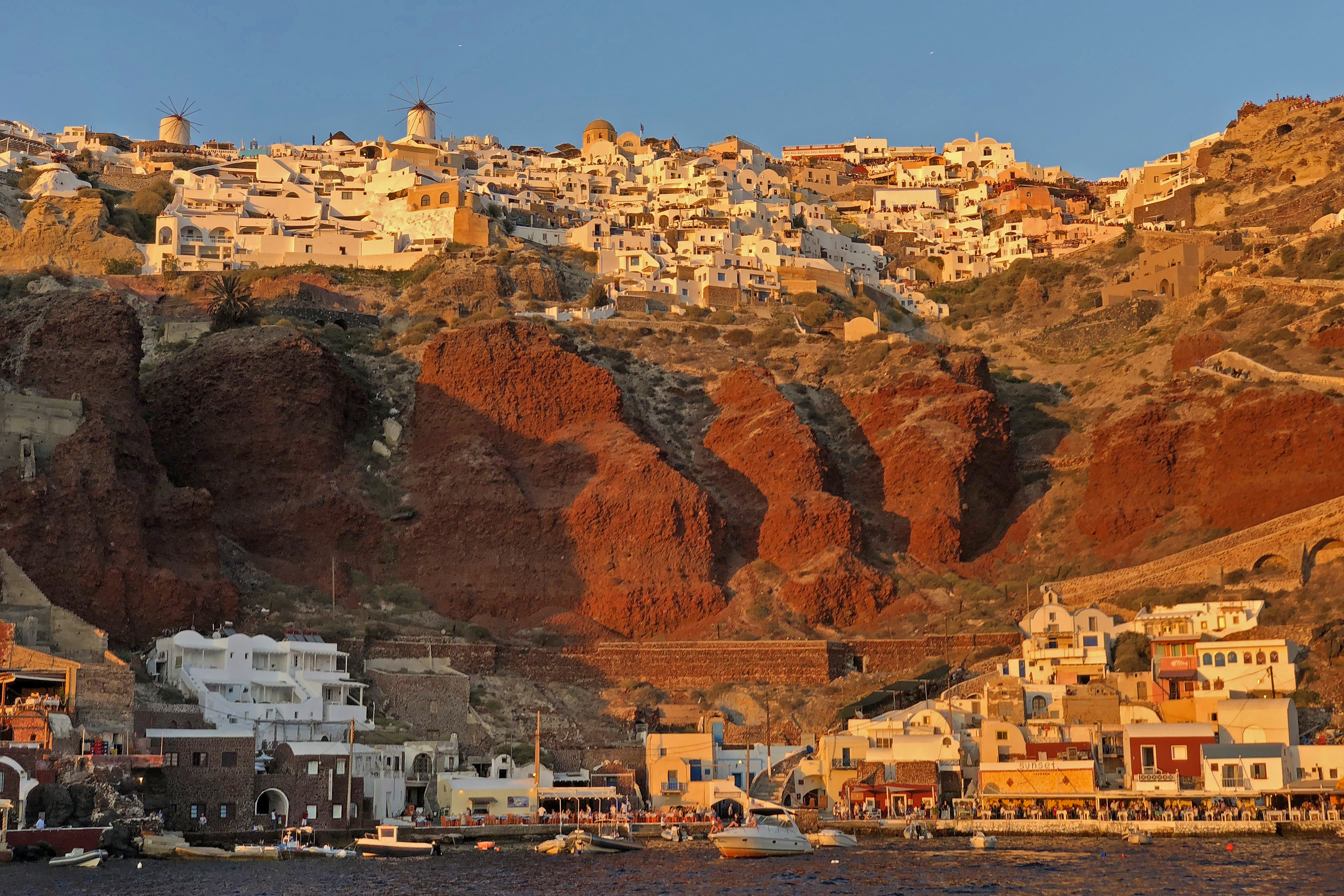
The village and its harbor at sunset

The settlement of Oia had been mentioned in various travel reports before the beginning of Venetian rule, when Marco Sanudo founded the Duchy of Naxos in 1207 and feudal rule was instituted on Santorini. Under the da Corogna family, Agios Nikolaos Kastell (Καστέλι του Αγίου Νικολάου), also called Apanomeria (Απανωμερία), was one of five local citadels. Its residential keep, Goulas, is now in the oldest part of the town, on its southwestern edge.

In 1537, Hayreddin Barbarossa conquered the Aegean islands and placed them under Sultan Selim II. However, Santorini remained under the Crispo family until 1566, passing then to Joseph Nasi and after he died in 1579 to the Ottoman Empire.

From the 16th to the 19th century, the settlement was designated Apanomeria on maps. In the mid-17th century, Jean de Thévenot used the name Castelli San Nicolas. The name was changed to Oia in the second half of the 19th century.

In the late 19th and early 20th centuries, the town was a mariners' town that flourished as a result of seaborne trade throughout the Mediterranean, particularly as part of the trade route between Russia and Alexandria. In 1890, Oia had approximately 2,500 residents and approximately 130 sailing ships. There was a wharf in the bay of Armeni. Excellent wine was produced in quantity in the hinterland and exported to France, amongst other places. However, the arrival of steam and the concentration of shipping at Piraeus caused the town's seagoing trade to collapse, and agriculture also diminished as increasing emigration took place, especially to Piraeus and Laurium. The economy of the town declined in the early 20th century on account of wars, economic depression, and overexploitation of fish resources.

The 7.8 magnitude earthquake on 9 July 1956 caused considerable damage. The epicentre of the strongest aftershock (magnitude 7.2) was located off the northern coast of Santorini. The earthquake was followed by renewed emigration, and in 1977 Oia had only 306 inhabitants. After the earthquake, the village redeveloped into an attractive tourist town of the Cyclades, and is known as a "picture-perfect" town, which gets crowded with people during the summer season.

== Geography ==
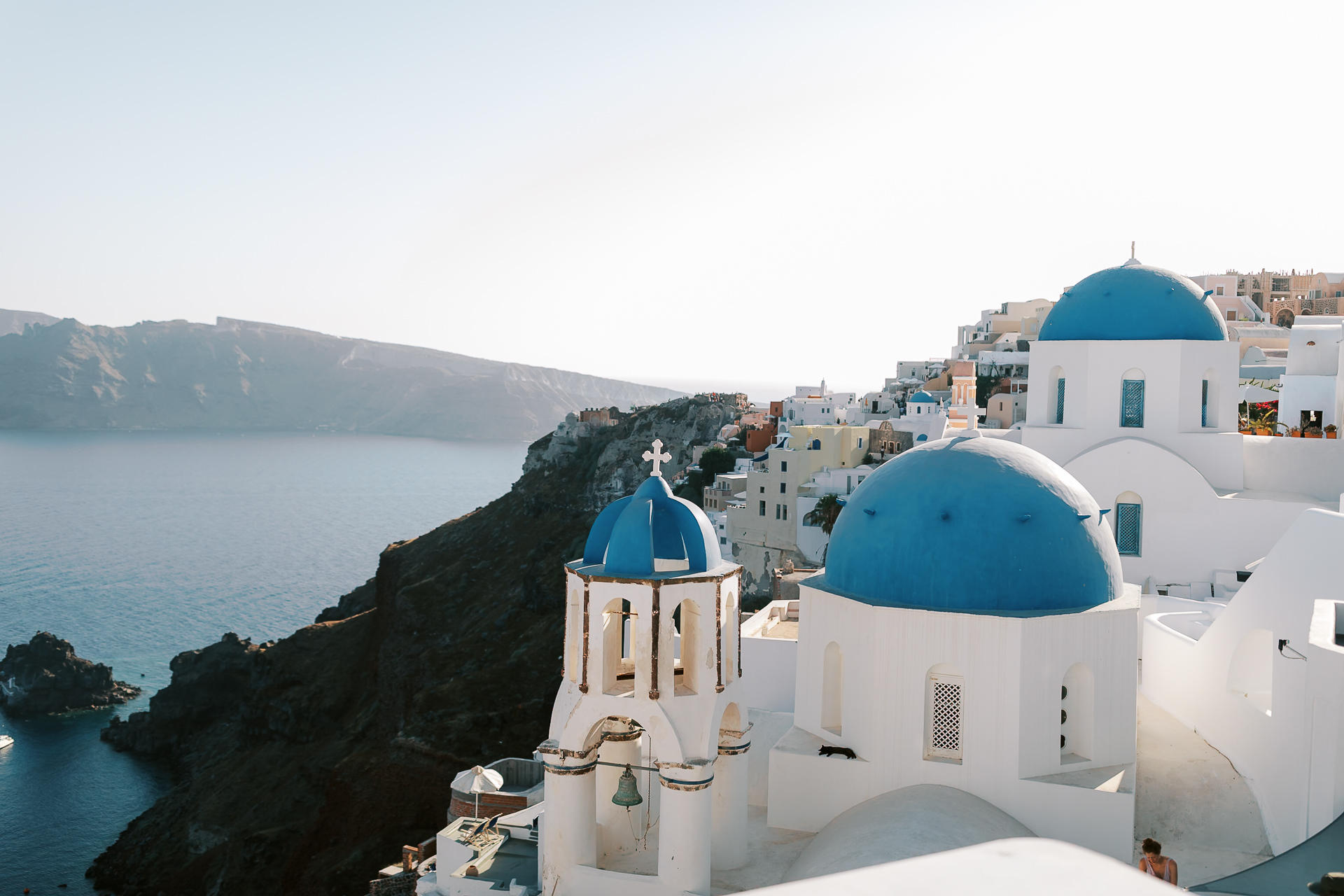
Santorini island

Oia is a scenic village on the north west edge of the Santorini island within the Cyclades. It extends for almost two kilometres (1 1/4 mi) along the northern edge of the caldera that forms the island of Santorini, at a height of between 70 and 100 metres (230 and 330 ft) above sea level. Immediately to the east is Phinikia (Φοινικιά; Finikia), and about 500 m (550 yd) to the north is Tholos (Θόλος). Amoudi Bay lies below the town. The small fishing village of Ormos Armeni (Όρμος Αρμένης) lies below Oia to the south and is reached via steps. There is a ferry connection to Therasia from the harbour village of Ormos Ammoudi (Όρμος Αμμουδιού; also spelled Amoudi) to the west. There are 300 steps down to the port from Oia. The small island of Agios Nikolaos lies to the southwest.

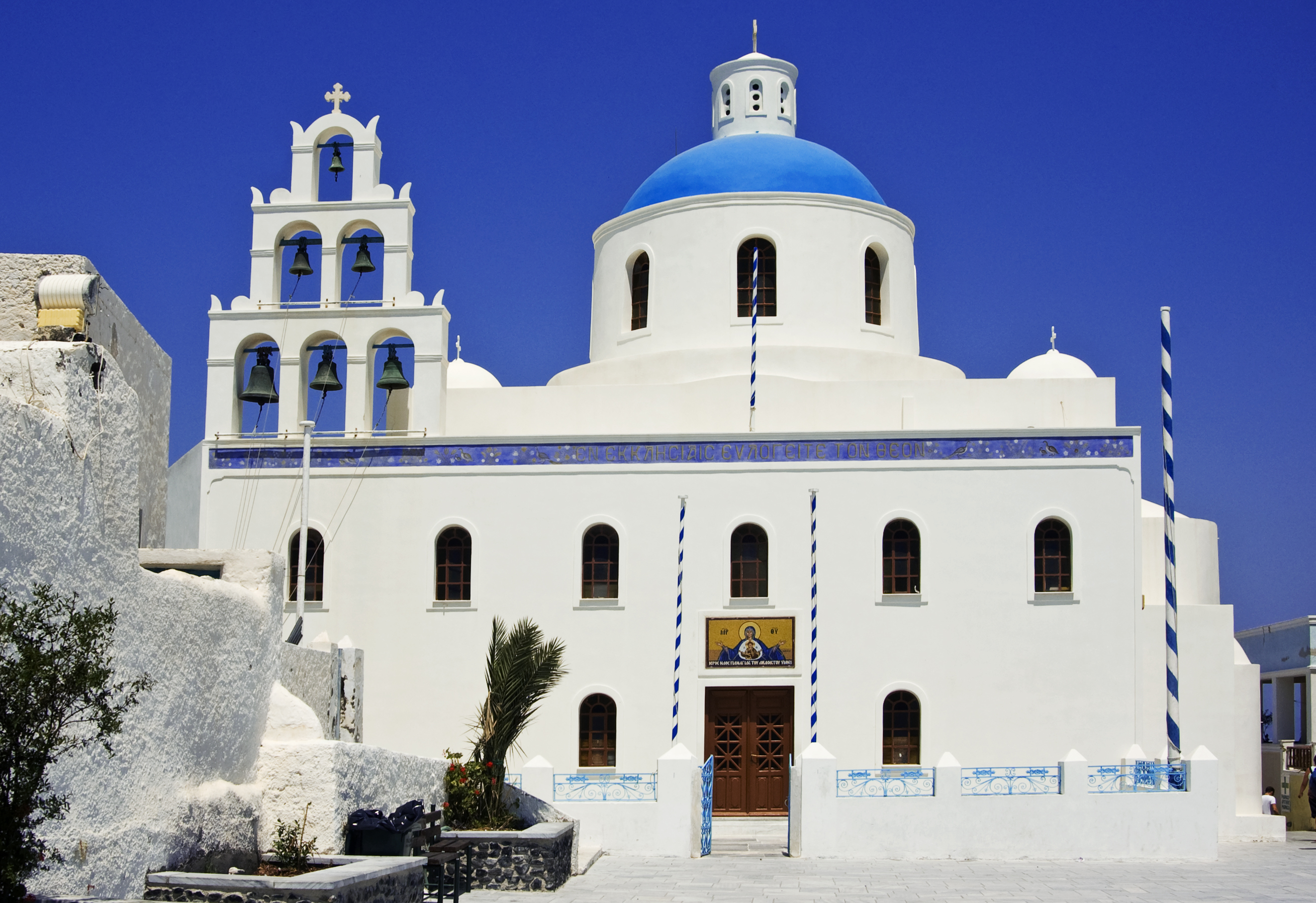
A church in Oia

It is built on the steep slope of the caldera, and the houses and restaurants are built into niches carved into the caldera on the seaward side. There are narrow passageways and a central square. The sunlight hours in this village are much longer than in Fira town. Its paths are very narrow and hence get congested during the tourist season. The idyllic surroundings of the town have a complex of white-washed, blue-domed churches and charming, traditional Cycladic houses and cave houses that are carved into the rock face on top of the cliff. It is set in a location that provides excellent views of the sunset over the caldera. To the southwest, the Bay of Armeni, reachable from the town on foot or by mule, was once an important boatbuilding centre. Small repairs are now done on a single wharf. Excursion boats for trips around the island and ferries to Therasia leave from here. The harbour of Ammoudi on the western side of the town is reached by steep stairs north of Fort Londsa; there are a few tavernas and a pebble beach.

The village is located on top of a hill, at about 150 m (500 ft) elevation, and is known as the "Eagle's Nest" from which Palia and Nea Kameni volcanoes are seen, as well as the island of Therasia. It is situated to the north of the island, and Fira is at a distance of 11 km (7 mi). The main street in the town, in the central square, is the main trekking path, which is cobbled, called the "Nikolaou Nomikou", which goes up the hill winding round the caldera. The island is reached from Fira, which is the transport terminus of the island. Caldera boat cruise options are available from either Oia or Fira.

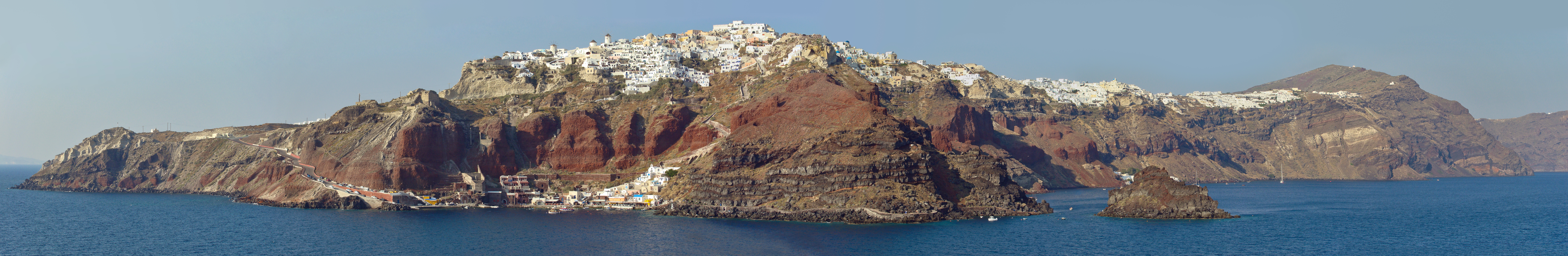
View of the coast of Therasia with Oia above the former fishing village of Ammoudi

=== Climate ===
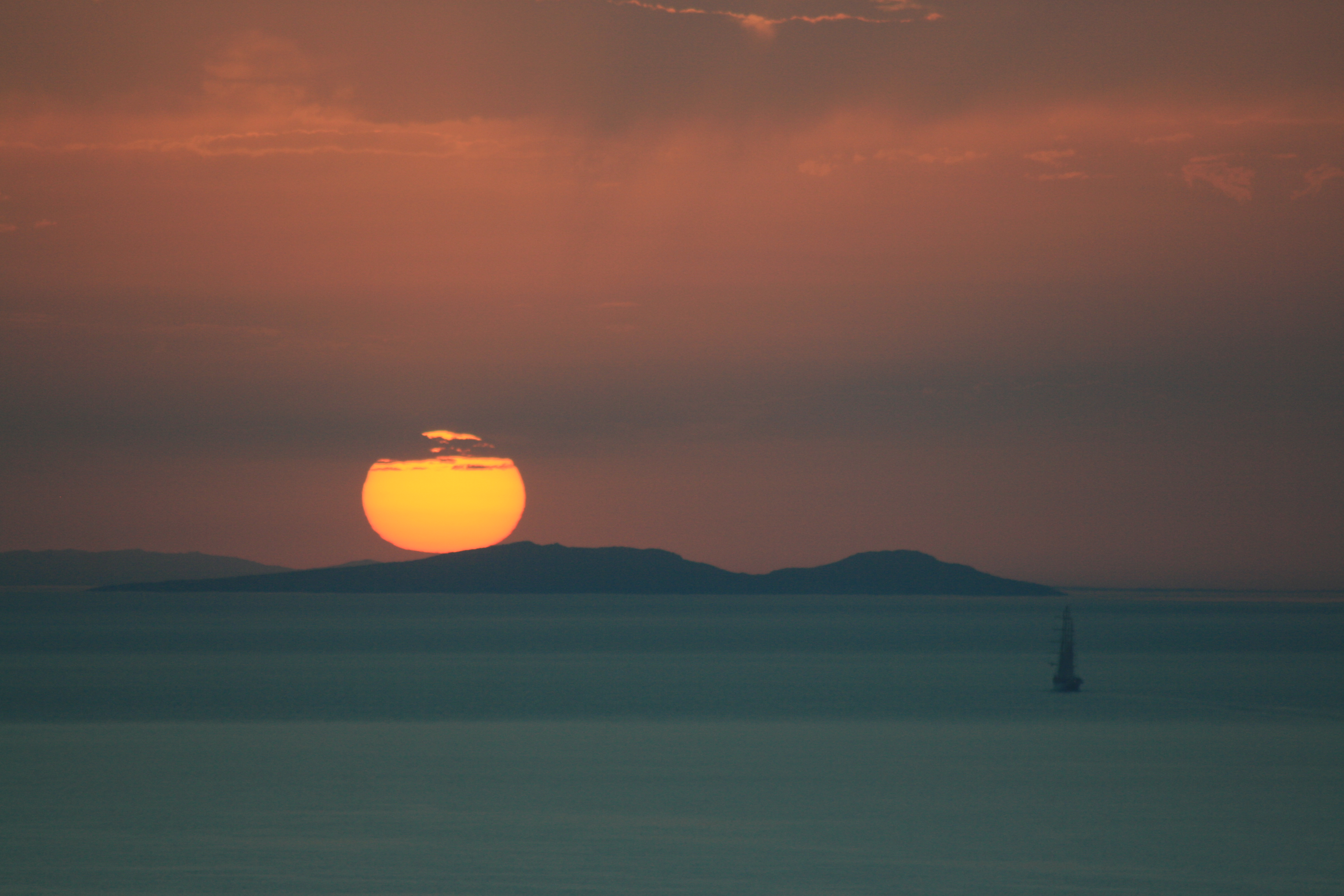
Sunset in Oia

In Oia, the climate is generally temperate and mild. Winter is the wet season, and summers are hot and dry. The absolute maximum temperature on record is 40 °C (104 °F) in June and the absolute minimum in December is 0 °C (32 °F). Wind speed varies between 56 km/h (16 m/s; 35 mph) in August and 98 km/h (27 m/s; 61 mph) in October and February.

Climate data for Oia, Greece
Month	Jan	Feb	Mar	Apr	May	Jun	Jul	Aug	Sep	Oct	Nov	Dec	Year
Mean daily maximum °C (°F)	14 (57)	14 (58)	16 (61)	19 (66)	22 (72)	26 (79)	27 (81)	28 (82)	26 (78)	22 (72)	18 (65)	16 (60)	21 (69)
Mean daily minimum °C (°F)	9 (49)	9 (49)	11 (51)	13 (55)	16 (61)	20 (68)	23 (73)	23 (73)	21 (69)	18 (64)	14 (57)	11 (52)	16 (60)
Average precipitation mm (inches)	71 (2.8)	43 (1.7)	41 (1.6)	15 (0.6)	10 (0.4)	0 (0)	0 (0)	0 (0)	51 (2)	100 (4)	200 (8)	71 (2.8)	602 (23.9)

== Government ==
From 1840 to 1851, Oia was an independent community, Dimos Oias (Δήμος Οίας) from 1 October 1834 (ΦΕΚ 4/1835). Under the Kapodistrias plan of 1997, it was combined with Therasia to form the rural community of Oia, Kinotita Ias (Κοινότητα Οίας). Under the 2010 Kallikratis plan for administrative reform, which took effect on 1 January 2011, this was folded into the newly created municipality of Santorini, Dimos Thiras (Δήμος Θήρας), as the district of Oia (Δημοτική Κοινότητα Οιας).

== Architecture ==
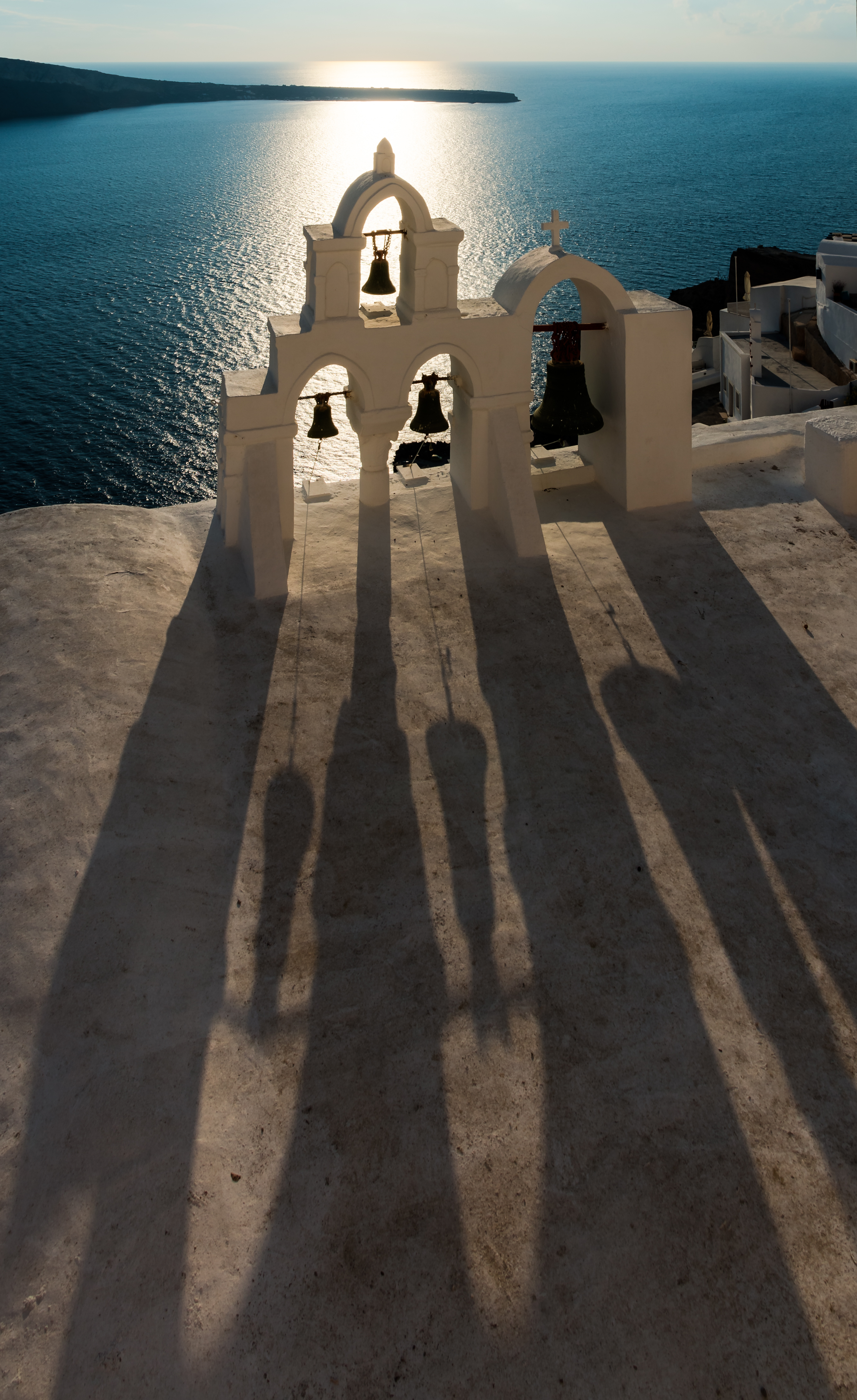
Four bells in Oia

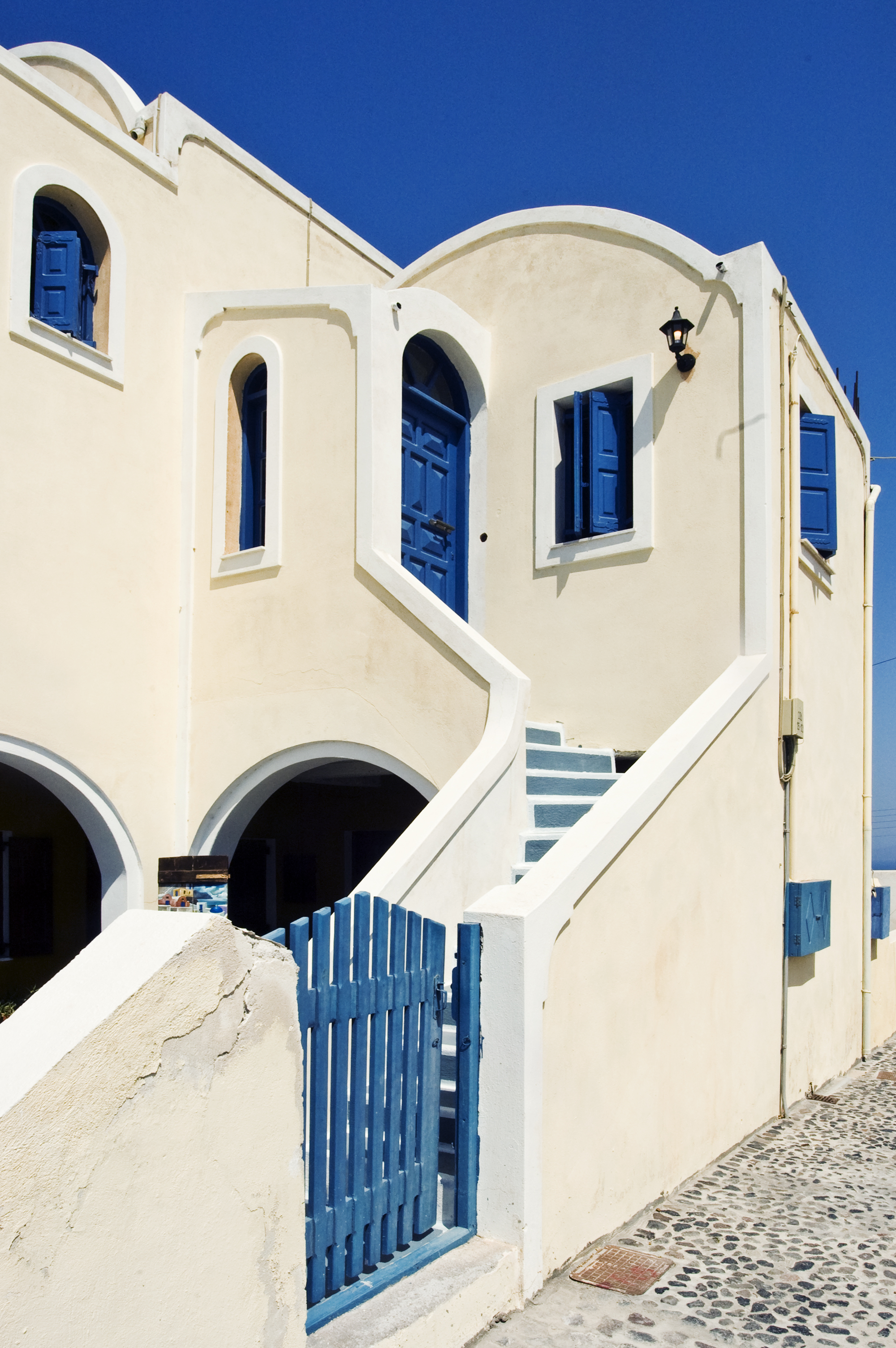
A typical white-and-blue painted house in Oia

Oia typifies the white-painted houses of the Cyclades, in many cases built directly into niches which are cave houses used by the crew of the ships, on the lip of the volcanic crater, between which are narrow alleys and blue-roofed churches with cupolas. The wealthy ship captains of the late 19th century built neo-classical mansions. These houses are seen built in succession, one above the other.

In 1976, the town was included in the programme for preservation and development of traditional settlements of the Greek National Tourism Organisation under Aris Konstantinidis. Over 15 years, the programme sought to preserve, restore, and find new uses for selected houses and architectural ensembles representative of traditional Greek architecture. Many of the yposkafa spitia (υπόσκαφα σπίτια), simple seamen's houses on the edge of the caldera, became guest houses, hotels, and restaurants.

For their work in Oia, the Greek National Tourism Organisation received the Europa Nostra Prize in 1979 and the Prize of the Architecture Biennale in Sofia in 1986.

Oia Community is working with geologists at the University of Athens and the University of Thessaloniki to map the geology of the area and evaluate ground stability. The President of the Community has restricted construction to minimise risk from future earthquakes.

The town is noted for its white and blue domed houses. The houses are painted with white lime water so that the rainwater that falls over them runs down and can be collected. The other reason for painting the houses white is for aesthetic purposes. The other explanation given is that during the Ottoman rule of Greece, which lasted for over 400 years, Greeks were not allowed to fly their white flag. In defiance, in Oia, they painted their entire housing complex in white with domes, giving the village an effective white perspective and elegance. Impressive houses in the town are those "cliff houses" built in the niches carved into the caldera slopes with the provision of air-filled pumice, which provides insulation benefits to the building, keeping it warm in winter and cool in summer.

== Cityscape ==
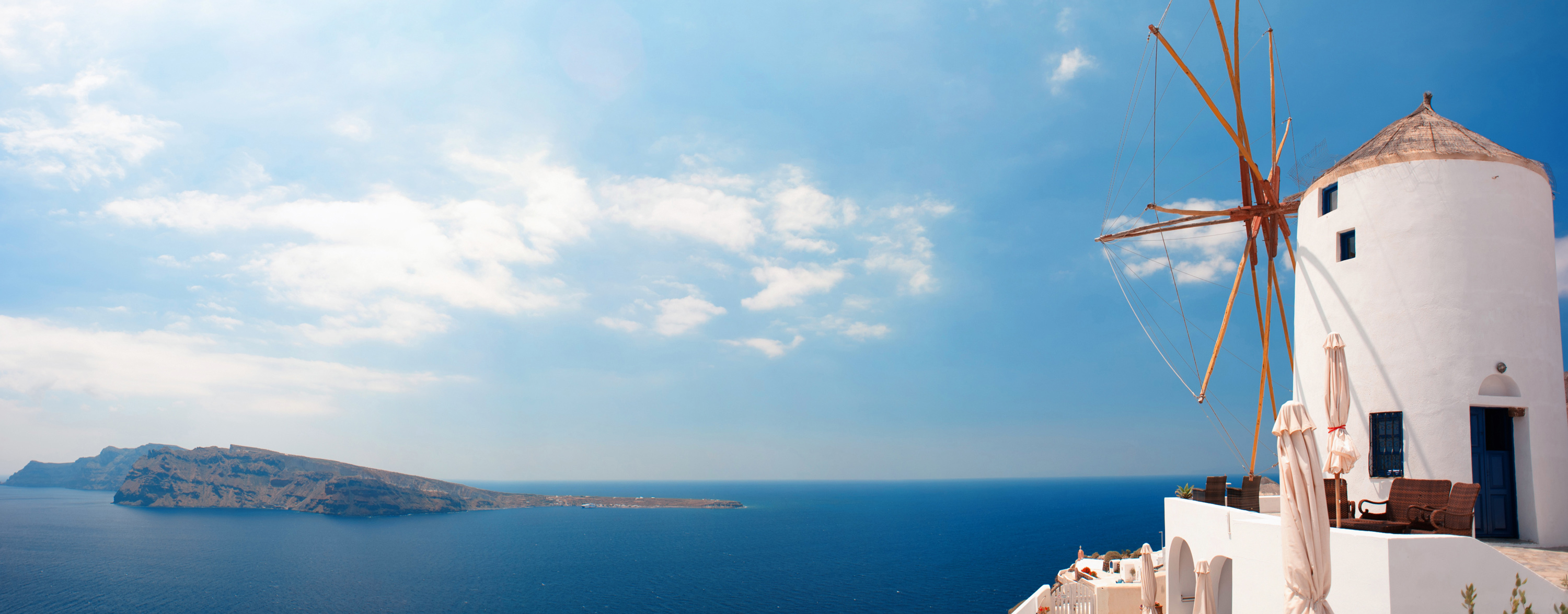
The windmill, one of the most recognizable buildings in the town

At the pinnacle of Oia is the ruined castle, which was the seat of the Argyri family under the Venetians and serves as a lookout point with a complete 360-degree view. It is also called Fort Londsa. This castle was part of the same Venetian defense system as Pyrgos and was once one of the island’s strongest fortresses. One of the most recognisable buildings in the town is an old windmill, which often appears on postcards. Many kiosks offer a range of ethnic goods, handicrafts, jewellery, and souvenirs, and several small art galleries, including Art Gallery Oia and The Art Gallery. The town also has numerous restored churches, including Panagia church; some were built in memory of sailors.

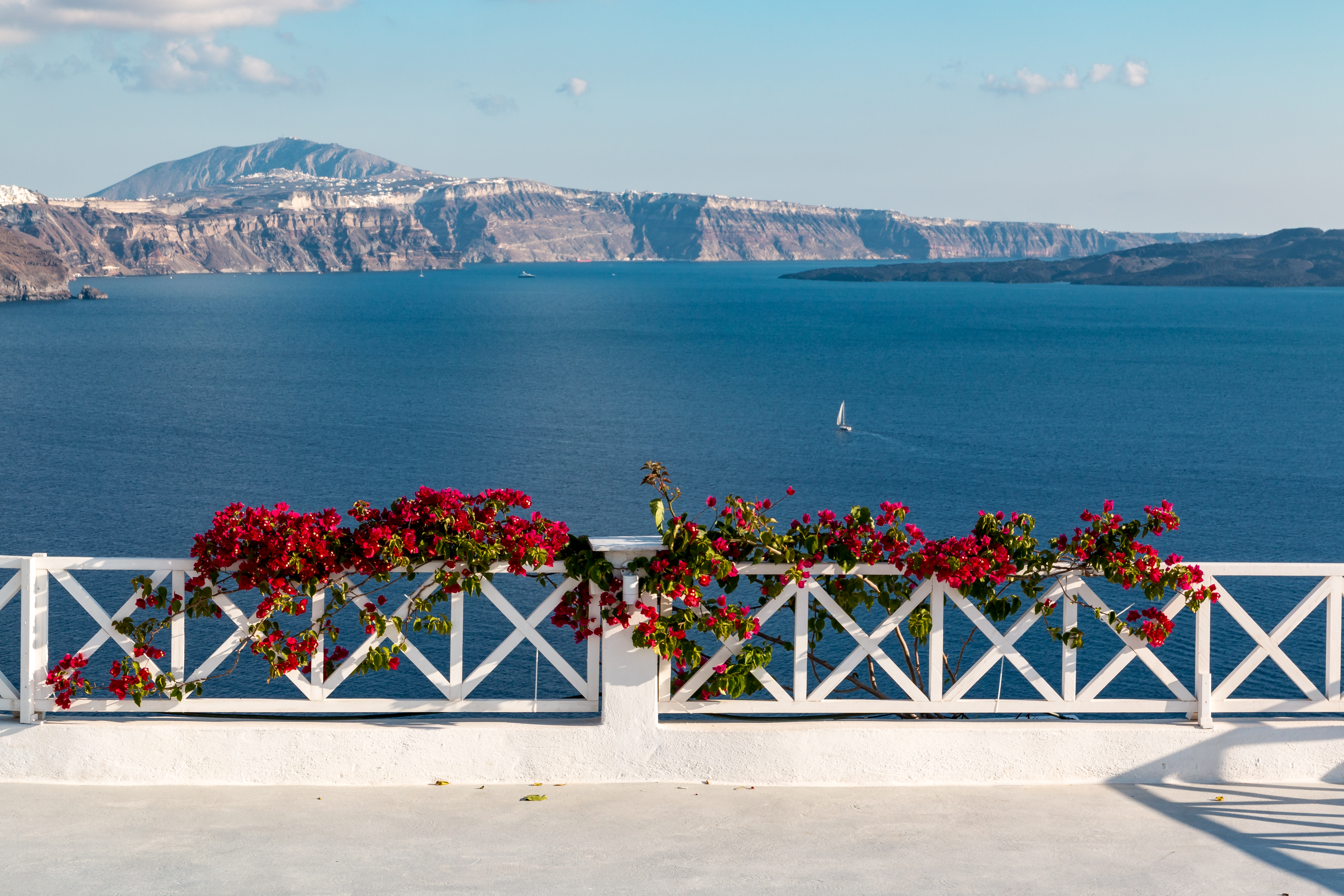
Railing with flowers

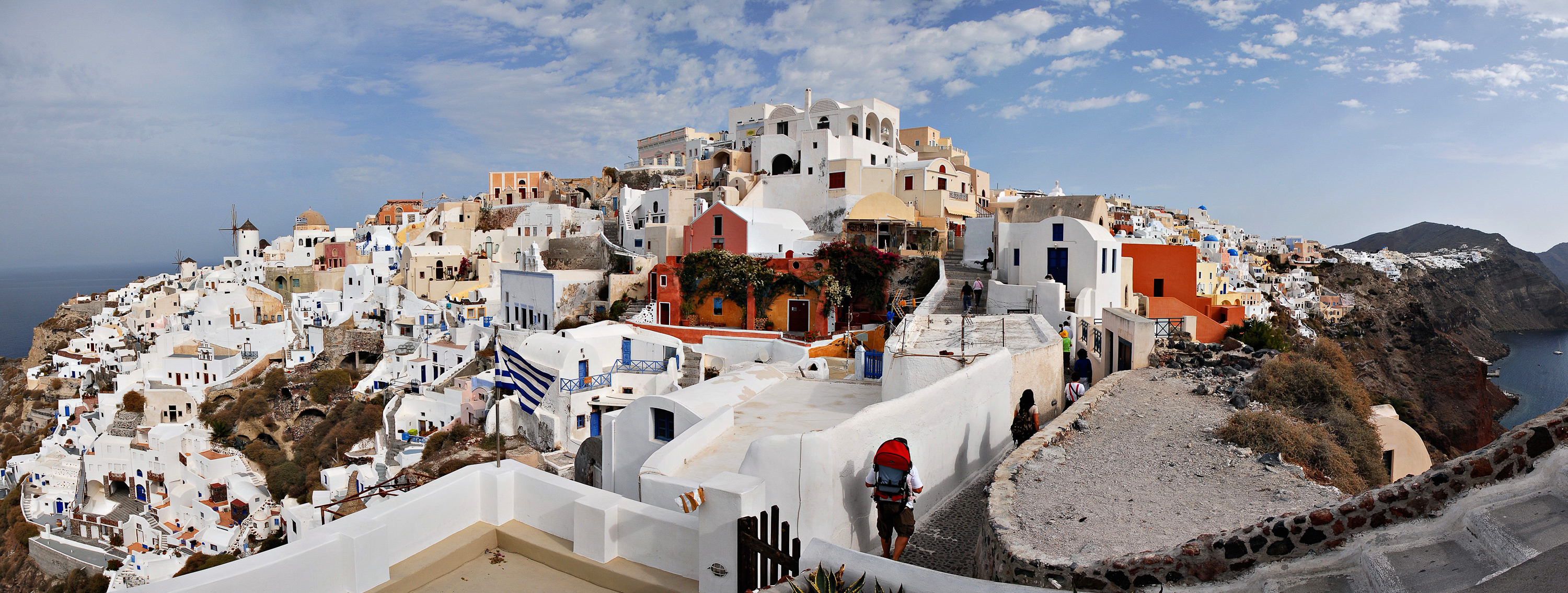

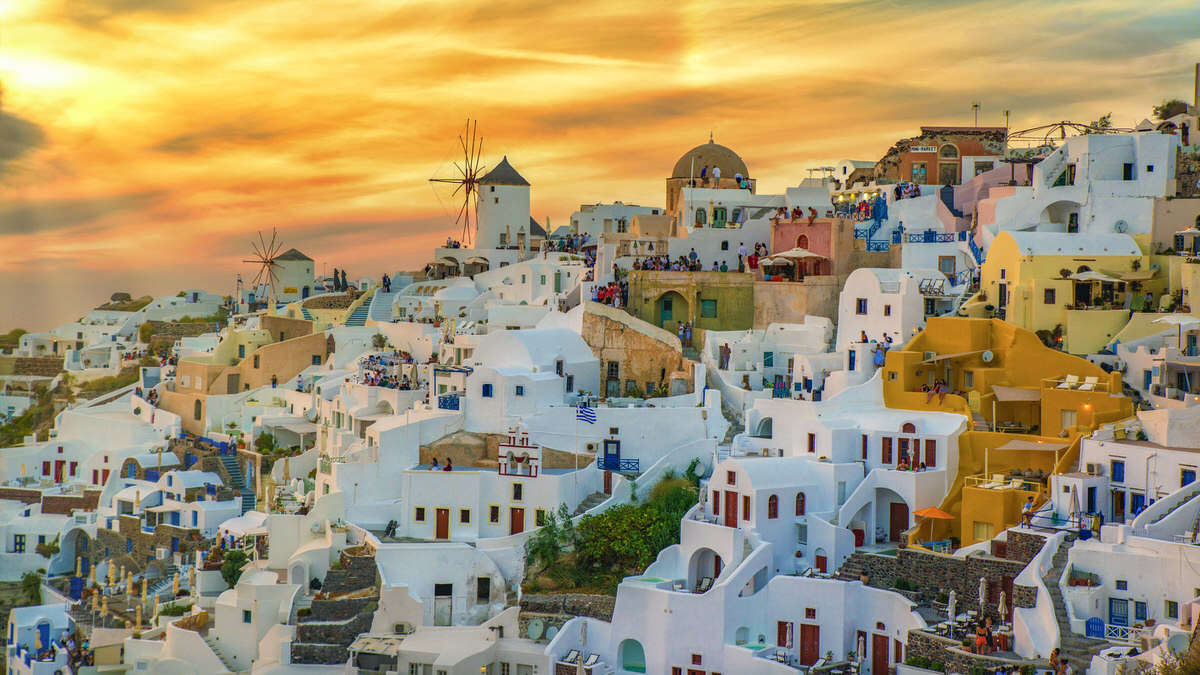
Oia sunset

Other infrastructure and cultural facilities available in the town are a cultural centre, a bank, ATMs, cash services, an internet café, a bus station, a post office, a health clinic and pharmacy, apart from the cafés, bars, restaurants and taverns on the coastal path. The Weaving Mill near the Maritime Museum has many looms and produces fine textiles, which are on sale. Also traded in the town are agricultural products like honey, wine, capers, and fava beans.

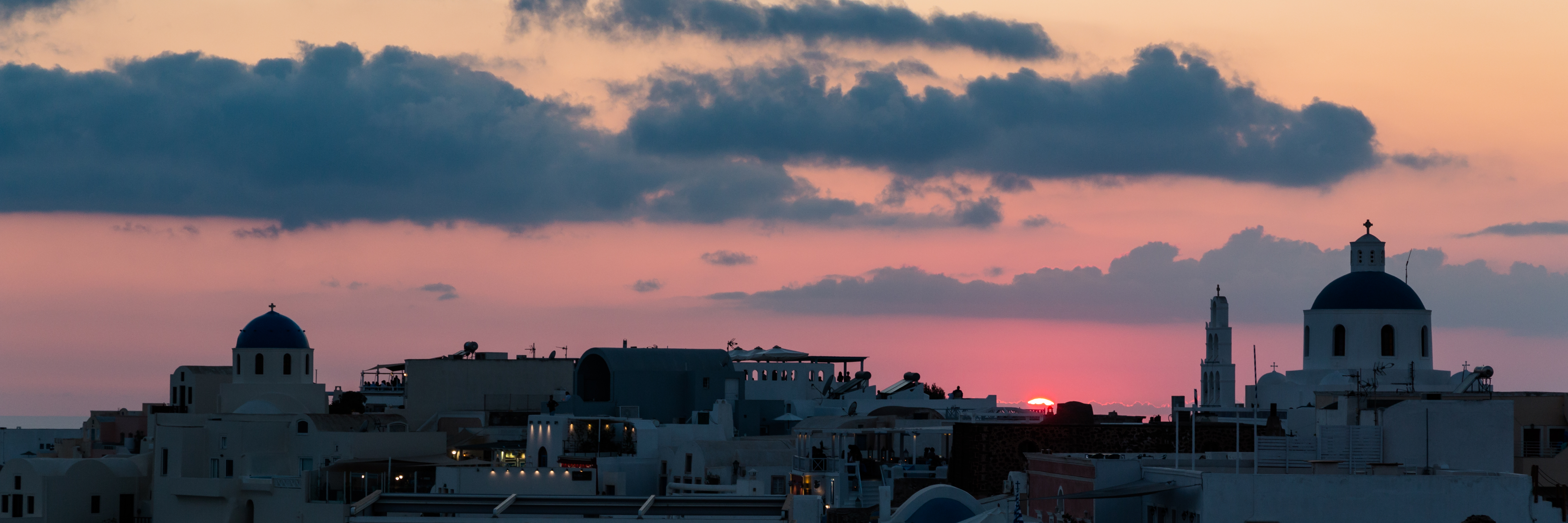
Sunset in Oia

One of the most popular attractions in the town is sunset viewing. It is a special event every evening in Oia from the Sunset Serenade point. At this time, the town is crowded with people to watch the spectacle, as the white houses and the caldera catch all the colours of the setting sun for a few seconds.

=== Naval Maritime Museum ===
Another 19th-century mansion in Oia, a block away from the cliff-top, has been restored and converted into the municipal museum of the maritime history of Thira. It displays rare figureheads, ancient nautical charts with English labels, seamen's chests, old maritime equipment such as mastheads, drawings and patterns, models of old and new Thiran ships, and historic photographs. It has a library containing many letters and documents.

== In popular culture ==
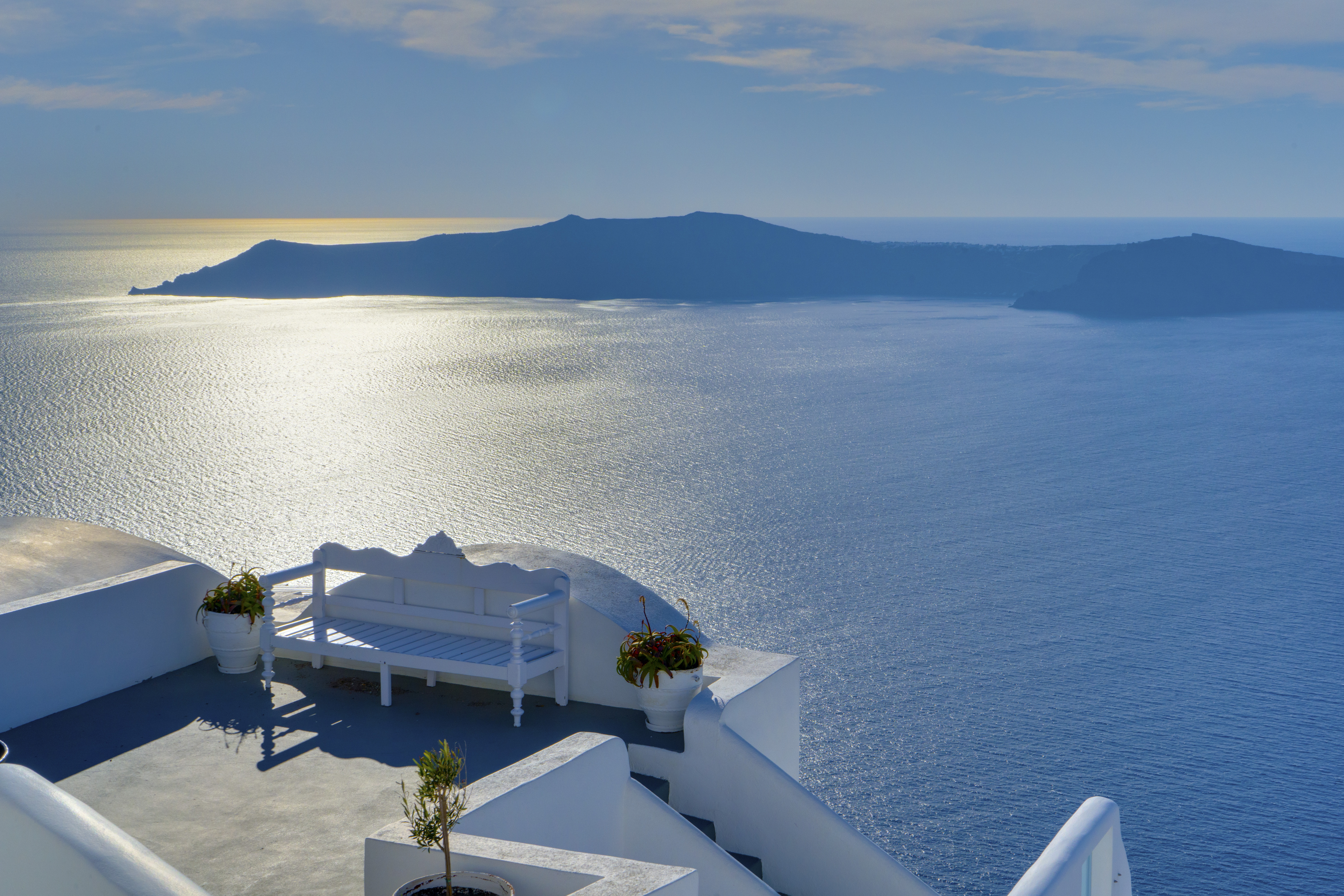
The Aegean seen from the top of Caldera at Oia

Oia was the centre of the story in the 1982 film Summer Lovers. Michael and Cathy, two characters in the film, lived in a villa in Oia. This villa was bought by a couple in 1987 and has been converted into a gift shop named "Summer Lovers".

In 2004, Oia was used for the location of a few scenes in the movie The Sisterhood of the Traveling Pants and again for The Sisterhood of the Traveling Pants 2. Oia was also featured in the opening sequences of the film Lara Croft Tomb Raider: The Cradle of Life, starring Angelina Jolie. The jet ski chase scenes were shot in and around Ammoudi, the old fishing port below Oia. The film was nominated for a "Teen Choice Award" in 2009.

Louise Candlish's 2007 novel Since I Don't Have You is set in Oia and London.

In the 2008 video game Sonic Unleashed, the level Apotos is based on Oia. The flag for Apotos also resembles the flag of Greece. Also, in the 2016 video game Overwatch, the level Ilios is closely based on Oia.

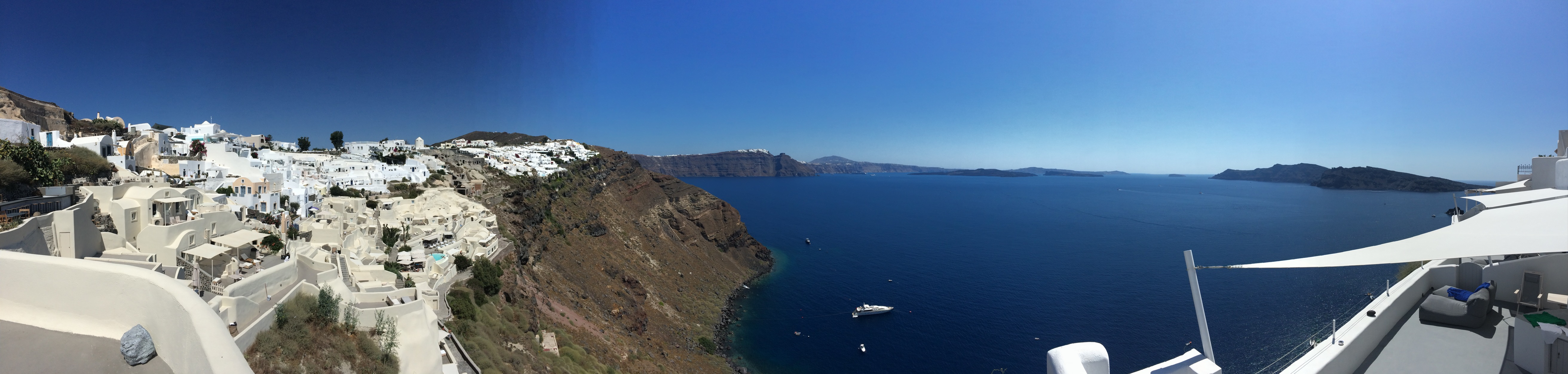
Panoramic view from Oia's cliffs, overlooking the island of Santorini, Thira, Volcano (Palia & Nea Kameni) and beyond.
