= Manolo =

Manolo, a form of Manuel (name), is a male given name which may refer to:

People:

- Manolo el del Bombo (1949–2025), Spanish football fan
- Manolo Álvarez Mera (1923–1986), Cuban-born bel canto tenor
- Manolo Badrena (born 1952), Puerto Rican percussionist
- Manolo Betancur (born 1976), American baker and immigrant rights activist
- Manolo Blahnik (born 1942), Spanish fashion designer of shoes known as Manolos
- Manolo Caracol (1909–1973), Spanish flamenco artist
- Manolo Cardona (born 1977), Colombian actor
- Manolo Escobar (1932–2013), Spanish singer of "Y Viva España"
- Manolo Gabbiadini (born 1991), Italian footballer
- Manolo García (born 1955), Spanish singer and painter
- Manuel Gaspar Haro (born 1981), Spanish footballer
- Manolo (sculptor), real name Manuel Martinez Hugué (1872–1945), Catalan sculptor
- Manolo Lama (born 1962), Spanish radio sportscaster
- Manolo (footballer, born 1960), full name José Manuel Martínez Toral, Spanish footballer
- Manolo (footballer, born 1985), real name Manuel López Escámez, Spanish footballer
- Manolo Millares (1926–1972), Spanish painter
- Manolo Noriega, real name Manuel Noriega Ruiz (1880–1961), Mexican actor
- Manolo Poulot Ramos (born 1974), Cuban judoka
- Manolo Rivera Morales (1934–1996), Puerto Rican sportscaster
- Manolo Saiz (born 1959), Spanish professional road bicycle team manager
- Manolo (footballer, born 1965), real name Manuel Sánchez Delgado, from Spain
- Manolo Sanchez (Nixon staff member), valet to Richard Nixon
- Manolo Sanchís, real name Manuel Sanchís Hontiyuelo (born 1965), Spanish footballer
- Manolo Sanlúcar (1945–2022), Spanish flamenco composer
- Maurizio Zanolla (born 1958), known as Manolo, Italian rock climber

Places:

- Manolo Fortich, a municipality in the province of Bukidnon in the Mindanao Island of the Philippines

Fictional characters:

- Manolito's father, don Manolo, in the Mafalda comic strip
- Manolo or Manny Ribera, from the 1983 film Scarface
- Manolo Sanchez, a character in the 2014 animated film, The Book of Life

== Other uses ==
- Manolo (typeface), a foundry type made by Ludwig & Mayer

== See also ==
- Manola (disambiguation), feminine form
- Lolo (disambiguation), a shortened form of the name
- Manalo
- Menalo
