= Manola Zabalza =

Mexican politician (born 1995)

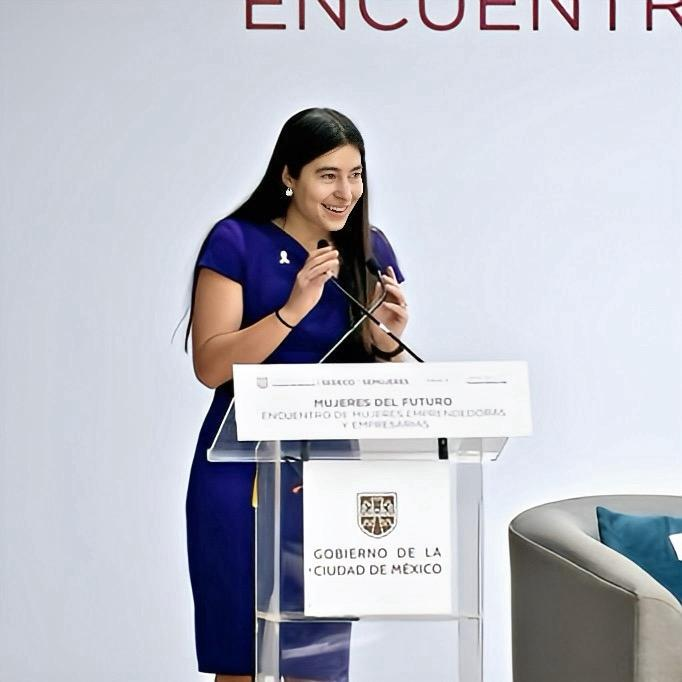
- Zabalza in 2024

Secretary of Economic Development of Mexico City
- Incumbent
- Assumed office 5 October 2024
- Head of Government: Clara Brugada
- Preceded by: Fadlala Akabani Hneide

Personal details
- Born: 20 May 1995 (age 30)
- Party: Morena

Manola Zabalza Aldama (born 20 May 1995) is a Mexican politician serving as secretary of economic development of Mexico City since 2024. From 2019 to 2023, she was a technical coordinator at the Secretariat of Foreign Affairs.
