= Eccles =

Eccles may refer to:

== Places ==
=== England ===
- Eccles, Greater Manchester, a town in North West England
  - Eccles (UK Parliament constituency), an electoral division represented in the House of Commons of the United Kingdom
  - Eccles (ward), an electoral ward
- Eccles, Kent, England
- Eccles on Sea, Norfolk, England
- Eccles Road railway station, Norfolk, England

=== Scotland ===
- Eccles, Scottish Borders

=== France ===
- Eccles, Nord, a commune in Nord department, France

=== United States ===
- Eccles, West Virginia, an unincorporated community in West Virginia
- Eccles Avenue Historic District, Ogden, Utah
- Eccles Broadcast Center, Salt Lake City, Utah
- Eccles Building, Washington, D.C.
- Eccles Coliseum, in Cedar City, Utah, home of the Southern Utah University football team
- Rice-Eccles Stadium, in Salt Lake City, Utah, home of the University of Utah football team

== Transport ==
- Eccles Interchange, a tram/bus interchange in Eccles Greater Manchester
- Eccles Line, a tram line in Greater Manchester
- Eccles railway station, in Eccles Greater Manchester
- Eccles Road railway station, in Norfolk, England
- Eccles Street, in Dublin, Ireland

== Other uses ==
- Eccles. or Eccl. stands for Ecclesiastes, one of 24 books of the Hebrew Bible. Distinct from Ecclus., which stands for the Jewish work of ethical teachings, Ecclesiasticus
- Eccles (character), a character in The Goon Show
- Eccles (surname)
- Eccles College
- Eccles cake, a currant-filled cake
- Eccles Mine Disaster where an estimated 180 men died

== See also ==
- Ackles
- Ekels
- Eckels
