= Marcus O. Shivers =

American surgeon and genealogist (1877–1962)

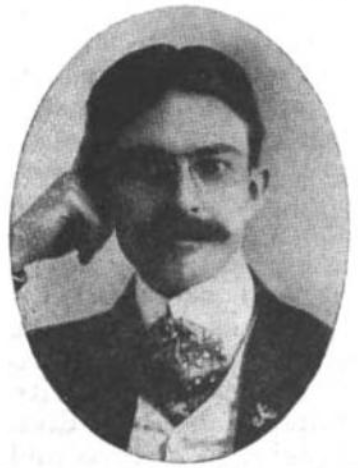
- Shivers in 1907

President of the American Thyroid Association
- In office 1932
- Preceded by: Kerwin Kinard
- Succeeded by: Henry S. Plummer

Personal details
- Born: September 14, 1877 Hazlehurst, Mississippi, U.S.
- Died: 1962 (aged 84–85) Colorado, U.S.
- Party: Democratic
- Education: Iuka Normal Institute (BS); University of the South (PhG, MD)

Marcus Orelius Shivers (September 14, 1877 – 1962) was an American endocrinologist, genealogist, and author, who served as the president of the American Thyroid Association in 1932.

== Background ==
Shivers was born on September 14, 1877, in Hazlehurst, Mississippi, to George W. Shivers and Nancy J. Kilcrease. His father was a merchant and planter of Scots-Irish descent, who had previously served as a private for the Confederacy during the American Civil War in the 39th Mississippi Infantry. His maternal grandfather was also a veteran, having served in the Mexican–American War of the 1840s.

== Education and career ==
Shivers first attended Iuka Normal Institute, obtaining a B.S. there. Later, in 1899, he earned a Graduate of Pharmacy degree from the University of the South, in Sewanee, Tennessee. The following year, he received a medical degree from the same institution. He would subsequently attend the New York Polyclinic School, located in New York City. He also underwent further training in Europe.

Ultimately, Shivers chose to establish his medical practice in Colorado Springs, Colorado, deciding to specialize in thyroid surgery.

Years later, in 1932, he was elected president of the American Thyroid Association, a position he held for one year. Prior to this, he represented the association at the 1927 International Goiter Conference held in Bern, Switzerland. He would later become a professor of surgery in St. Francis Hospital Training School.

In 1950, Shivers published a book pertaining to his paternal lineage, Shivers Genealogy.

== Personal life ==
On April 27, 1904, Shivers married Eugenia B. Clausman, who hailed from Vicksburg, Mississippi. They had one son together, George, who was born on November 14, 1905. He was also a Freemason, and was affiliated with the Methodist Episcopal Church.

He died in 1962, at the age of 84 or 85, in Colorado.
