= Eccles (surname) =

Eccles is an English surname. Notable people with the surname include:

- Ambrose Eccles (1736–1809), Irish Shakespearean scholar
- Caroline Anne Eccles (1871–1965), English writer and activist
- Cat Eccles, British politician
- Charlotte O'Conor Eccles (1863–1911), Irish writer
- Clancy Eccles (1940–2005), Jamaican musician
- David Eccles (businessman) (1849–1912), American businessman from Utah
- David Eccles, 1st Viscount Eccles (1904–1999), British politician
- Edith Eccles (1910–1977), British archaeologist
- George S. Eccles (1900–1982), American businessman and philanthropist
- Graham Eccles (born 1949), English rugby player
- Henry Eccles (1670–1742), English composer
- Henry Eccles (cricketer) (1863–1931), English cricketer
- Henry E. Eccles (1898–1986), American rear admiral
- Jacquelynne S. Eccles (born 1944), American psychologist
- James Eccles (1838–1915), English mountaineer and geologist
- John Carew Eccles (1903–1997), Australian neurophysiologist and philosopher
- J. R. Eccles (1874–1956), English schoolmaster and author
- John Eccles (disambiguation), several people
- Marriner S. Eccles (1890–1977), American economist and banker, Federal Reserve Chairman
- Mary Eccles, Viscountess Eccles (1912–2003), American book collector and scholar
- Nigel Eccles, Northern Irish technology entrepreneur and business executive
- Solomon Eccles (1618–1683), English musician
- Spencer Eccles (born 1934), American financier and philanthropist from Utah
- Tony Eccles (born 1970), English darts player
- William Eccles (disambiguation), several people
