= Eckel =

Eckel is a German surname. Notable people with the surname include:

- Bruce Eckel (author of Thinking in Java and Thinking in C++)
- Horst Eckel (1932–2021), former German football player
- Ingrid Eckel (born 1944), German politician (SPD)
- Kyle Eckel, American football player
- Malcolm David Eckel, professor at Boston University

== See also ==
- Eckel Industries, an acoustics noise control company
- Ekel (disambiguation)
- Eckels, a surname
