= John Pendlebury =

British archaeologist

- Pendlebury in 1928 at age 24
- Born: John Devitt Stringfellow Pendlebury; 12 October 1904; London, England
- Died: 22 May 1941 (aged 36); Heraklion, Crete, Kingdom of Greece
- Cause of death: Killed in action (execution by gunshot)
- Resting place: Souda Bay
- Citizenship: United Kingdom
- Education: Winchester College, Pembroke College, Cambridge
- Known for: Environmental studies at Knossos while Curator there
- Spouse: Hilda Winifred (White) Pendlebury
- Scientific career
- Fields: Archaeology
- Workplaces: British School of Archaeology at Athens, Knossos; Egypt Exploration Society

John Devitt Stringfellow Pendlebury (12 October 1904 – 22 May 1941) was a British archaeologist who worked for British intelligence during World War II. He was captured and summarily executed by German troops during the Battle of Crete.

== Early life ==
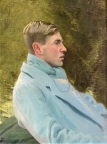
"A Cambridge Blue" (Pendlebury) by William Nicholson

John Pendlebury was born in London, the eldest son of Herbert Stringfellow Pendlebury, a London surgeon, and Lilian Dorothea (née Devitt), a daughter of Sir Thomas Lane Devitt, 1st Baronet, part owner of Devitt and Moore, a shipping company.

At the age of about two, he lost an eye while in the care of a friend of his parents. Conflicting reports of the accident were given. He used a glass eye, which, it has been said by people who knew him, was generally mistaken for a real one. Throughout his life, he remained determined to out-perform persons with two eyes. As a child, he was taken to see Wallis Budge at the British Museum. During the conversation, he apparently resolved to become an Egyptian archaeologist. Budge told him to study Classics before making up his mind. His mother died when he was 17, leaving him a legacy from his grandfather that made him financially independent. His father remarried but had no further children. Pendlebury got along well with his stepmother, Mabel Webb Pendlebury, and her son, Robin. He remained the centre of his father's affections, whom he called "daddy" in letters.

He was educated at Winchester (1918-1923), before winning scholarships at Pembroke College, Cambridge. At the University of Cambridge he was awarded a Second in Part I and a First in Part II of the Classical Tripos, "with distinction in archaeology". He also shone as a sportsman, with an athletics blue and competing internationally as a high jumper. Pendlebury finished second behind Carl Van Geysel in the high jump event at the 1926 AAA Championships.

He was painted by Sir William Nicholson as "A Cambridge Blue, John D. S. Pendlebury".

== The archaeologist ==
During the Easter holidays of 1923, Pendlebury and a master from Winchester had travelled to Greece, Pendlebury for the first time; visiting the excavations at Mycenae, they conversed with Alan Wace, then Director of the British School at Athens. Wace remembered him as a boy who wished "to see things for himself". The visit solidified his determination to become an archaeologist.

=== Student at the British School ===
On leaving university in 1927 Pendlebury won the Cambridge University Studentship to the British School at Athens. Unable to decide between Egyptian and Greek archaeology, he decided to do both and study Egyptian artefacts found in Greece. This study resulted in his Catalogue of Egyptian Objects in the Aegean area, published in 1930.

In Athens, Pendlebury stayed at the British School's student hostel, which also provided lodging for visiting scholars doing research in Greece. They dined with the students, conversing with them and each other on scholarly topics. Pendlebury wrote his first impressions to his father, that they were so learned, "It makes me feel such an impostor being there at all."

He soon found the companionship more to his liking. He hiked the Greek countryside with Sylvia Benton, who had excavated in Ithaca, competing with her to see who could walk the fastest, and became friends with Pierson Dixon, later British ambassador to France. He struck up a friendship also with another archaeology student, Hilda White, 13 years older than he was. Exploring the Acropolis of Athens with her, he climbed over the parapet and announced to the guard "I am a Persian."

The students explored Greece in groups, living an athletic life, in contrast to the sedentary preferences of the scholars. Pendlebury discovered 10 miles of an ancient road at Mycenae, where he also attended a village dance by a bonfire. Pendlebury also found time to play tennis and hockey, and to form an athletic team for running and jumping. He first visited Crete in 1928 with the other students. After a rough sea crossing at night they hastened on to Knossos, which Pendlebury at first concluded was "spoilt" by the restorations. The students then toured eastern Crete by automobile over muddy dirt roads, and in frequent heavy rain and snow. At the eastern end, they attempted to reach Mochlos and Pseira by leaking boat, but failed. They were prepared to swim for it. Pendlebury wrote a poem about the fleas he encountered while lodging in Sitia.

Resuming a busy life in Athens, Pendlebury was invited to his first excavation by the Assistant Director of the school, Walter Abel Heurtley, at an ancient Macedonian site near Salonica. Hilda White was invited also and became his constant companion. Unknown to Pendlebury, a close connection had always existed between the British School and Sir Arthur Evans. Evans apparently heard of Pendlebury's activities in Crete and Macedonia. Later in the year, in more propitious weather, Pendlebury was invited to stay at the Villa Ariadne with Evans and Duncan Mackenzie. Hilda White stayed in Heraklion. She reported that Mackenzie confided to Pendlebury in having "my own idea," which he did not tell to Evans.

By the end of the visit Evans was suggesting that Pendlebury might excavate in southern Crete, or even at Knossos. For a time Pendlebury became preoccupied with his marriage to White. His family was at first opposed to the match on the basis of the age difference. After Pendlebury wrote that they could not live without each other, the wedding was approved, after an acquaintance of one year. For a honeymoon, the couple undertook a physically arduous exploration of the mountainous northern Peloponnesus.

In the winter of 1928–1929, the Pendleburys visited Egypt for the first time. They assisted briefly in the excavation at Armant, then, late in 1928, at Tel el-Amarna. Excavations at Amarna had been started 40 years earlier by Flinders Petrie, but were then continuing under the directorship of Hans Frankfort for the Egypt Exploration Society. Hans Frankfort and his wife, Yettie, had been students at the British School before Pendlebury's arrival there. They were friends of Humfry Payne, whose wife, Dilys, would become Pendlebury's biographer in the latter part of her life. Humfry was appointed Director of the British School in 1929, still in his 20s.

John's studentship ended at the end of 1928; it was replaced by the Macmillan Studentship for another year's study, but only in Greece. The Pendleburys missed the subsequent winter at Amarna. In 1930 Payne and Dilys travelled to Crete to survey Eleutherna prior to its excavation, inviting the Pendleburys to accompany them. Humfry and Dilys stayed in the Villa Ariadne, where Evans, MacKenzie, and Gilliéron, Evans' fresco restorer, were at work, while John and Hilda Pendlebury joined Piet de Jong, Evans' artist, at the nearby Taverna. Knossos had been donated to the British School in 1924, but Evans retained control for the time being, continuing the restorations, and bringing affairs there to a conclusion. The donation had not only disposed of the estate, ensuring its continuity, but gave Evans virtual control of the British School as well. One matter requiring disposition was the retirement of his Director of Excavation, Duncan MacKenzie, now past 65 and in very poor health due to alcoholism, malaria, and the effects of a career of physically demanding work at Knossos. His retirement was set for the end of 1929, but Pendlebury represented an opportunity Evans could not neglect.

Pendlebury was looking for a position to begin when his studentship ran out. Someone at Knossos suggested he apply for permission to excavate in Crete. Later back in Athens his father recommended he return home and apply for a lectureship. He wrote back rejecting the plan, stating that he did not want "an academic life". Shortly afterward an unsigned, confidential telegram arrived asking if Duncan should retire in the autumn of 1929, would he be interested in the Directorship of Knossos? The telegram could only have come from Evans or Payne. Guessing Evans correctly, Pendlebury cabled back, "answer affirmative". There is no evidence that he was party to, or even knew about, the events of that autumn. Evans claimed that he had found MacKenzie sleeping during working hours and that he was drunk. Retirement was to become effective immediately. Piet de Jong opposed this move, claiming Duncan did not drink. The truth of the story made little difference to Duncan. He was so ill that he had to be placed in the care of his family, and could not be moved from Athens.

=== Director at Knossos and Amarna ===
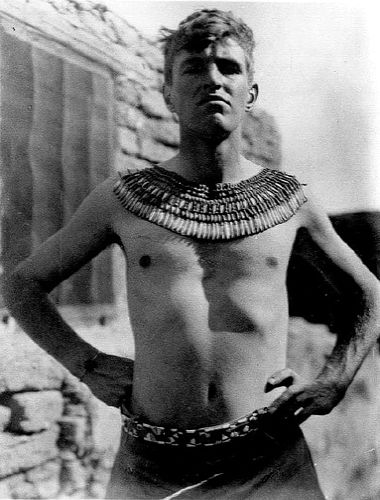
John Pendlebury in 1934

In the autumn of 1929 Arthur Evans appointed Pendlebury curator of the archaeological site at Knossos to replace MacKenzie. He was not required to assume the post of Knossos Curator until the spring of 1930. Meanwhile, he and Hilda toured Sicily and hiked over the mountains between Athens and Thebes. John taught Hilda the sport of fencing. He organised a student hockey match with a team from the Royal Navy. An article of his attempting to fit the siege of Troy into history was attacked by H. R. Hall of the British Museum. Pendlebury was outraged at this first professional critique of his work, claiming he had supported his conclusions fully with data. The Pendleburys arrived at the Villa Ariadne in March to assume the new post, but there was no improvement in contention. Almost immediately they received a second shock. A student at the British School had been invited to photograph some Greek vases in a private home and, during the shoot, the police burst in, arresting the owners of the vases for trying to sell antiquities out of the country.

Spyridon Marinatos, director of the Museum at Heraklion, wrote a note of protest to Pendlebury who demanded an investigation. Humfry Payne complained to the Ministry of Archaeology. Ultimately the British School was exonerated with an apology. Hall died in October. Of John, Dilys Powell wrote, "He would never ignore an offence".

By the time Pendlebury assumed the curatorship of Knossos, the site was overgrown, animals browsed freely among the ruins, and some buildings were in disrepair. In addition, the remaining agricultural land had to be leased. Visitation increased, much from dignitaries who required hosting. Sir Arthur Evans arrived with detailed instructions. While Evans refurbished the Taverna, situated on the edge of the Villa Ariadne property, with furniture and rugs, Pendlebury began sorting crates of artefacts from the excavation. He planned to add an archaeological library to the villa, now the headquarters of the British School on Crete. The Pendleburys were to occupy the Taverna, which, like the Villa, was a social centre for the archaeologists when the curator was not in residence. Piet de Jong had left Knossos to be with Humfry Payne during a new excavation at Perachora (near Corinth).

Because of the amount of work, which kept the Pendleburys and Evans busy from dawn until dusk, John welcomed the end of the season in July. Arthur and John excavated the Theatre Area. Evans' enthusiasm for his young acolyte was not entirely reciprocated. Pendlebury wrote to his father, "Evans is obviously itching to get my time here extended. That I will not have." When Evans left for the season, he wrote, "We have got rid of Evans thank the Lord ..."

The Pendleburys returned home for a visit, not knowing that, in a single season, John had established a reputation for being a man willing and able to take the responsibility of leadership. He began work on his Guide to the Stratigraphical Museum. Meanwhile, Frankfort had resigned suddenly from the directorship at Amarna to excavate in Iraq. In a crisis, the Egypt Exploration Society made a bid for Pendlebury's services, offering him the directorship of the excavation. The latter could hardly say no to this fulfillment of a lifelong ambition. He accepted. At age 26 he now held two of the most important positions in Aegean archaeology. He did not see a conflict. The climatic differences between Greece and Egypt made it possible to excavate in both countries each year: Egypt in the winter, Crete in the spring, with a break in the summer.

Pendlebury brought enthusiasm and colour to the excavation at Amarna, during which a handful of Europeans supervised up to 100 native workers. John had learned sufficient Arabic to get by from a textbook in 1928. Hilda learned practical Arabic from the servants. The living arrangements for the director and other Europeans were not entirely modest; however, Pendlebury was democratic in his bearing and manner, a policy on which he and Evans had been united. Just as Evans as a young reporter in the Balkans had purchased formal Turkish garb to wear at social occasions, Pendlebury purchased formal Cretan garb to wear on similar occasions at Amarna. In a photograph, however, he is shown shirtless posing wearing ancient Egyptian faience. He scowls, poking fun, perhaps, at ancient Egyptian statuary. He impressed the then British directors of Egyptian archaeology to such a degree that at the end of the first season he was offered a permanent post at the Cairo Museum. He turned it down, reporting privately that he did not wish "a stationary job".

In 1932 Pendlebury inherited the tedious work of cataloguing about 2000 sherds that had been excavated from Knossos. Evans went home, not to return until 1935, which relieved Pendlebury greatly. As assistants in the cataloguing task, he used his wife and two graduate students at the British School, Edith Eccles and Mercy Money-Coutts. That year also he built a tennis court at the site and added a nursery to the Taverna for his first child, David, born in England. Hilda rejoined him as soon as she could. In 1934 they had a daughter, Joan.

Much of the tension between Evans and Pendlebury came from their disagreement on the nature of the Knossos Guidebook. Pendlebury wanted to write the work himself according to his own outline, express his own views fully, have it published under his name, and get paid for it. Evans wanted merely a summary of Palace of Minos to be produced as part of Pendlebury's curatorship; however, he did want Pendlebury to ghostwrite it. The latter flatly refused. George Macmillan, of Evans' publishing firm, was called in to negotiate. He successfully wined, dined and convinced Pendlebury to undertake a compromise work. The book, published in 1933, was mainly written by Pendlebury, with additions and a foreword by Evans. Pendlebury had at last seen Evans' point of view on the restorations. He wrote in the Preface: "Without restoration, the Palace would be a meaningless heap of ruins ... and would eventually disappear completely." The book sold out very quickly, leaving none for distribution at Knossos. On complaining to MP, Harold Macmillan, Pendlebury was told that the MP himself would look into procuring more copies.

=== Freelance archaeologist ===
Pendlebury was Director of Excavations at Tell el-Amarna from 1930 to 1936 and continued as Curator at Knossos until 1934. By then it was clear to the scholars and archaeologists who were on the board of the British School that he was spreading himself too thin. Pendlebury had formulated a new plan, to write an archaeological guide to all of Crete. It required extensive explorations of all of Crete, which he began in 1933. His successor at Knossos, R. W. Hutchinson, later wrote such a guide, which the board did not find objectionable, but in 1934 they wrote to Pendlebury stating that they had changed the terms of the Curatorship. From then on the Curator was "not expected" to conduct "independent archaeological work out of reach of Knossos." Complaining that the board had "cracked the whip," Pendlebury resigned. He was solicitous about indoctrinating his successor, R. W. Hutchinson, who arrived with his family in 1935. In that year Evans visited Knossos for the last time to attend the unveiling of his statue. The Pendleburys were also present. Hard feelings had vanished.

From 1936 he directed excavations on Mount Dikti in eastern Crete and continued there until war was imminent.

=== Archaeological approach ===
Pendlebury was one of the early archaeologists who engaged in environmental reconstruction of the Bronze Age; for example, as C. Michael Hogan notes, Pendlebury first deduced that the settlement at Knossos appears to have been overpopulated at its Bronze Age peak based upon deforestation practices.

== War service ==
=== The "vigorous romantic" ===
Patrick Leigh Fermor said:

"He [Pendlebury] got to know the island inside out. ... He spent days above the clouds and walked over 1,000 miles in a single archaeological season. His companions were shepherds and mountain villagers. He knew all their dialects ..."

Manolaki Akoumianos, Evans' Cretan foreman at Knossos, said:

"...[he] knew the whole island like his own hand, spoke Greek like a true Cretan, could make up mantinadas all night long, and could drink any Cretan under the table."

These two quotes together comprise an explanation of why Pendlebury, a man of no military experience, chose to leave archaeology at the peak of his career to assume a difficult and dangerous role in the defence of Greece. Antony Beevor, historian of the Battle of Crete, attributes to Pendlebury the same conventional motive often attributed to British partisans of Hellenic causes starting with the Greek War of Independence in the early 19th century:

"Although an archaeologist, and an Old Wykehamist of conventional background, John Pendlebury was a vigorous romantic."

=== The path to special operations ===
In July 1939, Pendlebury reached an intermission of his work in Crete; An Introduction to the Archaeology of Crete was published and work had stopped at the excavation of Karphi. John and his family left Heraklion, where they had been staying, to return to England. John had some work he wanted to finish at Cambridge.

A number of sources say that in August 1939, he was placed on the "reserve of officers". This is the officer sign-up list for the Territorial Army (TA), the volunteer reserve of the British Army. Officer recruits would pursue their civilian careers until called up.

His work at Cambridge completed, John took his family to the Isle of Wight for a holiday. There, the Pendleburys heard on the radio on 3 September that the United Kingdom was at war with Germany.

Pendlebury was commissioned on the General List in January 1940. He was appointed British vice-consul at Candia (the Venetian name for Heraklion) in June 1940, but his job title did not hide the nature of his duties. He immediately set-to working up his outline plans: improving the reconnaissance (routes, hiding places, water sources) and sounding out the local clan chiefs like Antonios Gregorakis and Manolis Badouvas. Turkey had relinquished control over Crete only 43 years before and these kapetanios(local clan chiefs of the Greek resistance) would be the key to harnessing the Cretan fighting spirit. In October, on Italy's attempted invasion of Greece, Pendlebury became liaison officer between British troops and Cretan military authority.

In January 1941, he took part in an unsuccessful raid on Kasos, one of the Italian Islands of the Aegean.

=== Involvement in the Battle of Crete ===
By the time Germany had occupied mainland Greece in April 1941 Pendlebury had laid his plans, which could not include the Cretan division of the Greek army which was captured on the mainland. The invasion of Crete began on 20 May 1941, Pendlebury was in the Heraklion area where it started with heavy bombing followed by troops dropped by parachute. The enemy forced an entry into Heraklion but were driven out by regular Greek and British troops and by islanders armed with assorted weapons.

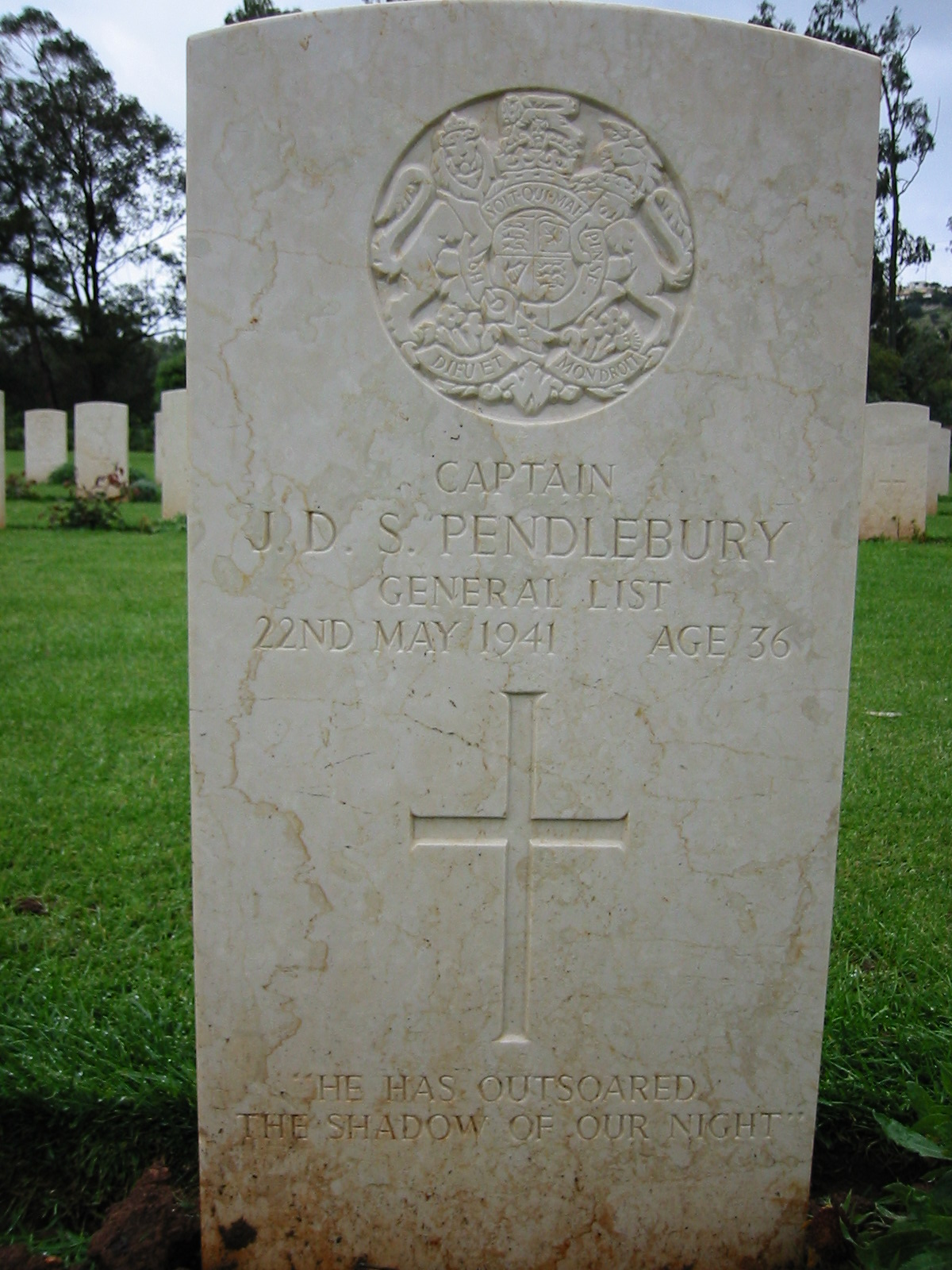
Grave of Pendlebury in Suda Bay War Cemetery

On 21 May 1941, with German troops attacking Heraklion, Pendlebury slipped away with his Cretan friends heading for Krousonas, the village of Kapetanios Satanas, which was some 15 kilometres (9.3 mi) to the southwest. They had the intention of launching a counterattack, but on the way there Pendlebury left the vehicle to open fire on some German troops, who fired back. Some Stukas came over and Pendlebury was wounded in the chest. Aristea Drossoulakis took him into her nearby cottage and he was laid on a bed. The cottage was overrun and a German doctor treated him chivalrously, dressing his wounds; he was later given an injection.

The next day Pendlebury had been changed into a clean shirt. The Germans were setting up a gun position nearby and a fresh party of paratroopers came by. They found Pendlebury who had lost his dog tags and was wearing a Greek shirt. As he was out of uniform and could not prove that he was a soldier, he was put against a wall outside the cottage and shot dead.

=== Epilogue ===
Captain Pendlebury was buried nearby but later reburied 1/2 mile (0.80 km) outside the western gate of Heraklion. He now lies in the Suda Bay War Cemetery maintained by the Commonwealth War Graves Commission (Grave reference 10.E.13). The epitaph "He has outsoared the shadow of our night" is a quotation from the 352nd line of "Adonaïs: An Elegy on the Death of John Keats" by Percy Bysshe Shelley.

From Eric Gill, Pendlebury commissioned for the Vitzelovrysis Spring on the Karphi ascent a stone surround with lettering. Serendipitously, Gill also designed elements of the Trumpington War Memorial. Unveiled in 1921, the names of some WWII dead were added later, including that of John Pendlebury.

He is also commemorated on his wife's headstone in the churchyard at Trumpington, a village on the southern outskirts of Cambridge.

== Works by Pendlebury ==
- Pendlebury, J. D. S. (1930). Aegyptiaca. A Catalogue of Egyptian objects in the Aegean area. Cambridge University Press.
- —— (1932). Archaeologica quaedam. Oxford: Classical Association.
- —— (1933). A handbook to the palace of Minos at Knossos with Its Dependencies. London: Macmillan & Co. Limited.
- —— (1933). A Guide to the Stratigraphical Museum in the Palace at Knossos. London: British School at Athens.
- ——; Money-Coutts, M.; Eccles, E. (1935). Journeys in Crete, 1934. Athens: British School at Athens.
- —— (1935). Tell el-Amarna. London: L. Dickson & Thompson.
- —— (1939). The archaeology of Crete: an introduction. Methuen’s Handbooks of Archaeology. London: Methuen & Co. Ltd.
- 1948 John Pendlebury in Crete. Cambridge: University Press. (Published privately after Pendlebury's death – with appreciations by Nicholas Hammond and Tom Dunbabin).

== Archives ==
The John Pendlebury Family Papers, covering the period from 1913 to 1964, are curated as part of the Pendlebury Archive Project (2018) by the British School at Athens.

== Bibliography ==
- Grundon, Imogen (2007). The Rash Adventurer: The Life of John Pendlebury. London: Libri.
- Powell, Dilys (1973). The Villa Ariadne. London; Sydney; Auckland; Toronto: Hodder and Stoughton. ISBN 9780340177709.
- Antony Beevor - Crete, the Battle and the Resistance (includes info about Pendlebury's wartime exploits)
- Holland, James (2010). Blood of Honour. Heraklion: Magna.
