= Ackles =

Ackles is a surname. Notable people with the surname include:

- Bob Ackles (1938–2008), Canadian football executive
- David Ackles (1937–1999), American singer-songwriter
  - David Ackles (album), self-titled album
- George Ackles (born 1967), American professional basketball player
- Jensen Ackles (born 1978), American television actor
- Jill Ackles, American television director
- Margie Ackles (1939–2019), American figure skater
- Stephen Ackles (1961–2023), Norwegian vocalist, pianist, and songwriter

== See also ==
- Eccles (surname)

Other uses

- ACLs, acronym for access-control lists
