= Ekel =

Ekel may refer to:

- Okoličná na Ostrove, known in Hungarian as Ekel, a village in Slovakia
- Ekel (Norden), a part of the town of Norden, Germany
- Fendry Ekel, painter

== See also ==
- Das Ekel (disambiguation), the title of several works in German
- Ekels, a surname (including a list of persons with the name)
