= George M. Eckels =

American politician (1857–1916)

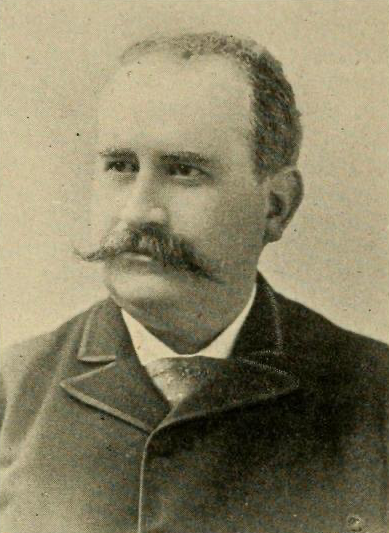
- Eckels in an 1893 publication

Member of the Pennsylvania House of Representatives from the Cumberland County district
- In office 1891–1894

Personal details
- Born: George Morris Eckels; April 29, 1857 Mechanicsburg, Pennsylvania, U.S.
- Died: May 23, 1916 (aged 59) Mechanicsburg, Pennsylvania, U.S.
- Resting place: Mechanicsburg Cemetery
- Party: Democratic
- Spouse: Clara Agnes Hertzler (m. 1897)
- Children: 2
- Education: Philadelphia College of Pharmacy (Ph.G.); University of Pennsylvania Medical School (MD)
- Occupation: Politician; physician; businessman

George Morris Eckels (April 29, 1857 – May 23, 1916) was an American politician and physician from Pennsylvania. He served as a member of the Pennsylvania House of Representatives, representing Cumberland County from 1891 to 1894.

== Early life ==
George Morris Eckels was born on April 29, 1857, (Note: Multiple cites list birth date as April 29, one cite states April 23.) in Mechanicsburg, Pennsylvania, to Sarah Ann (née Proctor) and William Eckels. His father was a farmer and cooper. He attended public schools in Mechanicsburg from 1863 to 1873. He later attended the Philadelphia College of Pharmacy and graduated with a Ph.G. in 1879. He graduated from the University of Pennsylvania Medical School with a Doctor of Medicine in 1885.

== Career ==
In 1873, Eckels worked at a drug store in Mechanicsburg. In January 1877, he worked at a drug store in Philadelphia. After graduating in 1879, he moved back to Mechanicsburg and partnered with his younger brother Walter L. purchased the drug store he worked at from Mr. Bridgeford. He worked as a clerk and the brothers ran the business under the name Eckels Brothers. After graduating in 1885, he continued working at the drug store and as a physician in Mechanicsburg. In November 1903, the Eckels brothers purchased a drug store in Harrisburg and his brother Walter ran that store. He was manager of Bell Telephone Company in Mechanicsburg from 1885 to 1907. He was principal of the Cumberland Valley State Normal School (later Shippensburg University).

In January 1883, Eckels was elected as a transcribing clerk of the Pennsylvania House of Representatives. He was a Democrat and served as a delegate to the 1884 Pennsylvania Democratic Convention. He was a delegate to the 1884 Democratic National Convention. He served as a member of the Pennsylvania House of Representatives, representing Cumberland County from 1891 to 1894. He served on the centennial affairs, pensions and gratuities, insurance and public health and sanitation committees. He also served as a member of the Mechanicsburg council.

Eckels was director and treasurer of the Mechanicsburg Cemetery Association.

== Personal life ==
On June 9, 1897, Eckels married Clara Agnes Hertzler, daughter of Elias Hertzler, of Monroe Township. They had two daughters, Janet Wallace and Maybelle. He was a member and trustee of the Presbyterian Church.

Eckels died on May 23, 1916, in Mechanicsburg. He was interred at Mechanicsburg Cemetery.
