= Mercy Seiradaki =

British archaeologist

- Born: Mercy Burdett Money-Coutts; 16 April 1910; Devon, England
- Died: 1 September 1993 (aged 83)
- Occupation: Archaeologist
- Known for: Working with John Pendlebury
- Spouse: Michael Seiradakis
- Children: John Hugh Seiradakis, Sophia Hester Seiradaki

Note: In the Greek language Seiradaki is the customary last name for a woman married to someone called Seiradakis. More information here.

Mercy Seiradaki (née Money-Coutts; 16 April 1910 – 1 September 1993) was a British archaeologist who worked in Crete in the 1930s, mostly on projects led by John Pendlebury, including excavations at Knossos. She co-authored several reports on the work undertaken with him and published a later key text on the pottery from Karphi in 1960. During the war she worked at Bletchley Park, and then joined the Red Cross. She worked with the United Nations Relief and Rehabilitation Administration (UNRRA) in Crete in the post-war years and lived in Greece for the rest of her life.

== Personal life ==
Mercy Burdett Money-Coutts was born on 16 April 1910 in Devon into an upper-class family, the only daughter of Hester Frances née Russell and Hugh Burdett Money-Coutts, later Baron Latymer. Unsurprisingly for a girl of her background, she was privately educated at home and presented at court before going to Lady Margaret Hall at Oxford University, and she entered enthusiastically into traditional English field sports. This background developed certain qualities helpful to her later work in archaeology. As well as being well-read and skilled in drawing, she built up physical stamina while deer stalking.

When, at the age of 37, she married Michael Seiradakis, a Cretan from an ordinary village background, her parents did not go the wedding, though a conventional announcement appeared in The Times.

== Education and work ==
After graduating in Modern History in 1932 she asked Arthur Evans to accept her as a student helper at Knossos. Evans had led this major project for decades but by this time excavations were directed by John Pendlebury, who became a mentor to Seiradaki. As well as excavating he undertook a major reorganisation of the on-site Stratigraphical Museum, a task in which Seiradaki would take a large part. She was accepted as a student of the British School at Athens at the same time as Edith Eccles who became a friend with whom she worked and travelled. Her endurance and stamina on difficult journeys over mountain tracks were noteworthy. There were several young women archaeologists from the UK and all were determined not to be put off by difficult terrain and challenging routes, and yet Seiradaki stood out for her reluctance even to ride a mule instead of walking.

After a winter in Athens studying prehistoric pottery she and Eccles went to Crete to help complete the catalogue of the museum at Knossos. Pendlebury and his wife worked to date one third of a huge collection of sherds assembled in 2000 boxes. Eccles and Seiradaki dated the rest and published the results in instalments. They also went on several expeditions in central Crete, often with Pendlebury, seeking out new sites and checking on some already discovered. This led to Pendlebury's book the Archaeology of Crete in which half of the illustrations were drawn by Seiradaki, particularly the drawings of seal stones and pottery patterns.

In 1934 she explored a variety of archaeological sites in the Peloponnese and other parts of mainland Greece, and returned to Crete in 1935. She continued to work in association with Pendlebury: in particular around Lasithi in central Crete. She excavated, helped publish, and also took opportunities to travel with Eccles. Some of her travel was to the Middle East and Egypt to explore links between Minoan and Oriental cultures. Although Arthur Evans' visits to Knossos had become less frequent in the 1930s, he knew enough about her work to give her the role of organising the Knossos section of a London exhibition celebrating the fiftieth anniversary of the British School, and of helping with a further display at the Ashmolean. He also used one of her drawings of a hoard of axes to illustrate his last work on the palace at Knossos.

When the cave at Trapeza was excavated she was responsible for the pottery and the challenge of dating it. She produced an extensive illustrated and descriptive catalogue of pottery and other smaller finds. About three quarters of the work published about the cave is by Seiradaki. She did similar work for other excavations run by Pendlebury in Lesithi, publishing as M. Money-Coutts. The work at Karphi was fully completed in 1960 when she published Pottery from Karphi under the name Mercy Seiradaki.

She was whole-hearted not only about her work but also about life on Crete. She learned modern Greek, got to know the island, its people and culture, and was known for her ability to get on with local workers on site. In this way, she can be seen as a pioneer of contemporary approaches to archaeological work, while she also fitted the early 20th century pattern of women assisting senior male archaeologists.

In the early years of the Second World War she worked, probably as a secretary, at Bletchley Park, the secret code breaking establishment. In 1944 she joined the Red Cross and was sent to Egypt. She is presumed to have wanted to return to Crete where some of the men she knew had worked with the Resistance, as did many academics associated with the British School at Athens. She and Eccles managed to travel from Libya to Crete in 1944 when the island was still considered dangerous. After her friend left for Athens she stayed on in Crete working for the United Nations Relief and Rehabilitation Administration (UNRRA), was awarded the bronze medal of the Greek Red Cross for her courage, and became a local heroine. Through UNRRA she met her husband who received many honours for acts of wartime bravery.

== Later life ==
After marrying and having a son (John Hugh Seiradakis, astronomer) and daughter (Sophia Hester) she lived in Crete until 1962. She continued her Red Cross work, her involvement with archaeology on the island, and offered "open house" hospitality to English-speaking visitors. She worked on her drawings for the Karphi pottery book and was a member of the first British Council in Chania. When the family moved to Athens in 1962 Seiradaki was active in the British School library. She died on 1 September 1993.
