= Ekels =

Ekels is a surname. Notable people with the surname include:

- John Ekels (born 1940), Canadian sailor
- Jan Ekels the Younger (1759–1793), Dutch painter
- Jan Ekels the Elder (1724–1781), Dutch painter

== See also ==
- Eckels
- Eccles (disambiguation)
