= William Eccles =

William Eccles may refer to:

- William Eccles (physicist) (1875–1966), British physicist and pioneer in the development of radio communication
- William Eccles (MP) (1794–1853), British Radical politician
- William Eccles (cricketer) (1838–1900), English cricketer, cricket administrator and British Army officer
- William J. Eccles (1917–1998), historian of Canada
