= Eckels =

Eckels is a surname. Notable people with the name include:

- Delana R. Eckels (1806–1888), chief justice of the Supreme Court of the Utah Territory
- Frank Eckels Beltzhoover (1841–1923) American lawyer and Members of the United States House of Representatives from Pennsylvania
- George M. Eckels (1857–1916), American politician and physician from Pennsylvania
- James H. Eckels (1858–1907), United States Comptroller of the Currency
- Kelley Eckels Currie, American lawyer and government official

== See also ==
- Eckel (disambiguation)
