= Henry Eccles (cricketer) =

English cricketer

Henry Eccles (4 March 1863 – 10 February 1931) was an English cricketer active from 1885 to 1889 who played for Lancashire. He was born and died in Liverpool. He appeared in six first-class matches as a righthanded batsman, scoring 40 runs with a highest score of 14, and held one catch.
