= Iuka Normal Institute =

Iuka Normal Institute (also called Iuka Normal School) was a normal school founded in Iuka, Mississippi in 1882, reportedly the first normal school built south of the Mason–Dixon line. It operated as a day school and boarding school, offering classes from first to tenth grades. In 1892, graduates of their tenth grade were deemed qualified to serve as principals of high schools. It ceased operation in 1902.
