= Phylakopi =

Bronze Age settlement in Milos, Greece

Coordinates: 36.7550°N 24.5046°E

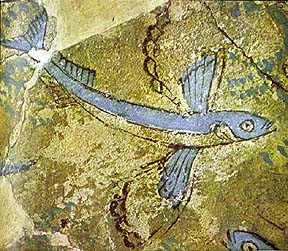
Minoan fresco at Phylakopi on Milos.

Phylakopi (Greek: Φυλακωπή), located at the northern coast of the island of Milos, is one of the most important Bronze Age settlements in the Aegean and especially in the Cyclades. The importance of Phylakopi is in its continuity throughout the Bronze Age (i.e. from mid-3rd millennium BC until the 12th century BC) and because of this, it is the type-site for the investigation of several chronological periods of the Aegean Bronze Age.

== Excavations ==
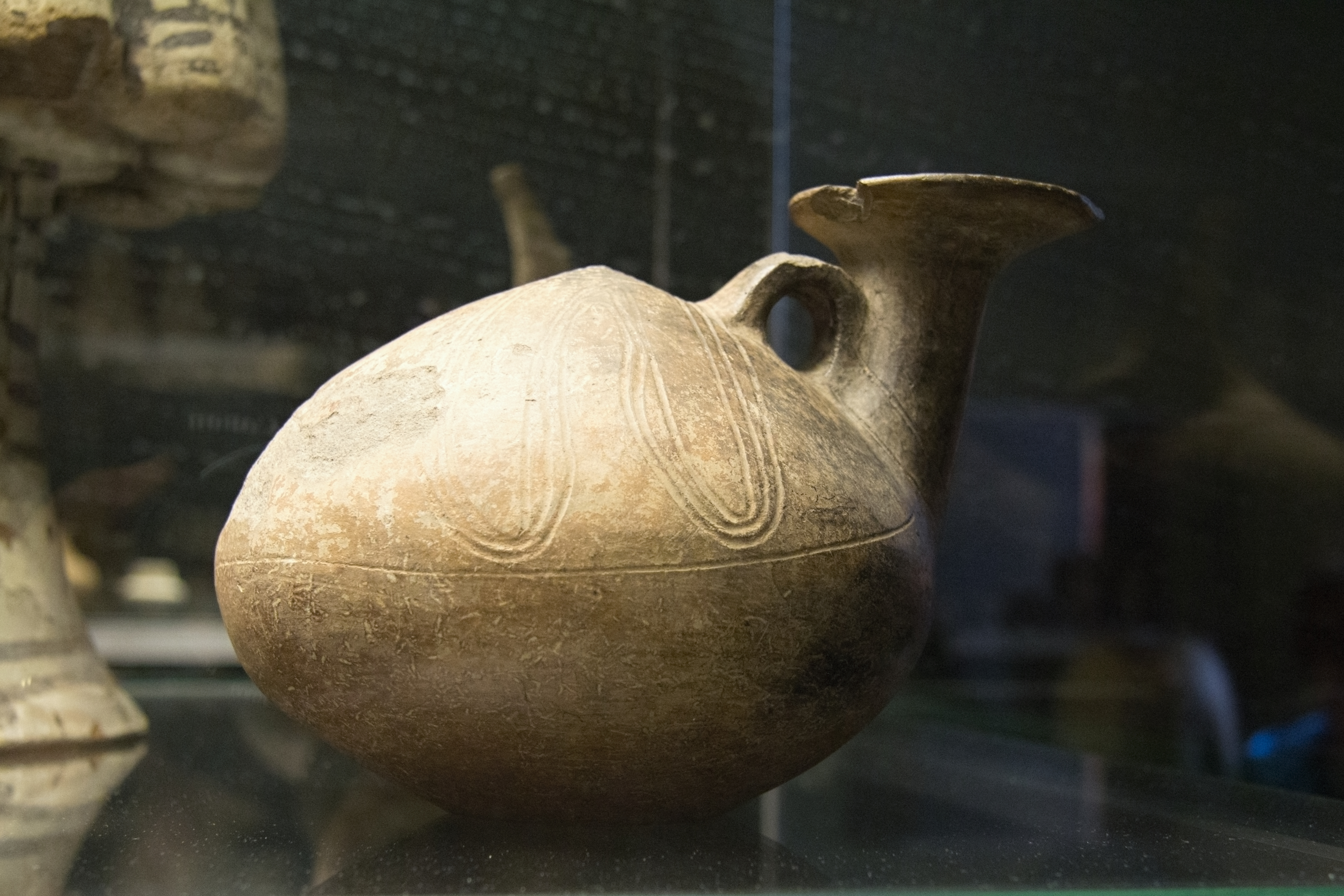
"Duck vase" from Milos, Phylakopi I culture. Cycladic Early Bronze Age 2800-2000 BC, British Museum

Phylakopi was first excavated between 1896 and 1899 under the British School at Athens (as well as all subsequent projects). The excavation was remarkably ahead of its time, with Duncan MacKenzie (the later foreman to Sir Arthur Evans at Knossos) recording detailed stratigraphic information. The excavation revealed a hitherto unknown Bronze Age Cycladic settlement with continuity throughout the Early Bronze Age to the very end of the Late Bronze Age. It was from this excavation that the three phase stratigraphy was suggested, the second and third phases relating to periods of Minoan and Mycenaean influence respectively. The settlement was re-excavated in 1910–11 with a focus on refining ceramic chronology. The most recent excavation at the site was conducted by Professor Colin Renfrew. The excavations were covered in two monographs and revealed a previously unknown Sanctuary.

== Megaron ==
The Megaron of Phylakopi is a significant Late Bronze Age architectural complex located at Phylakopi Initially discovered in 1899 by archaeologist Duncan Mackenzie during excavations for the British School at Athens. Phylakopi is a key example of Mycenaean palatial architecture in the Aegean islands, which Mackenzie identified as a "Mycenaean Palace," with a central large hall (megaron), antechamber, and associated corridors and rooms. The subsequent work by R. M. Dawkins and J. P. Droop in 1911 had a profoundly negative impact on the site's integrity. Their re-excavation of the Megaron area is criticized in later reports for having "dug away without adequate published record most of the structure which Mackenzie’s work had revealed." Their methods caused significant disturbance, particularly in the southern part of the complex, stripping away upper layers and crucial stratigraphic relationships without proper documentation Significant re-excavation and analysis in the 1970s, under the direction of Colin Renfrew, fundamentally revised the understanding of the site's chronology and phasing.

The uppermost architectural layer is the LH IIIA (Late Helladic IIIA, c. 14th century BCE) Mycenaean-style megaron. Its classic plan includes a large main hall (approximately 8.6 x 6.2 meters) with evidence of a central hearth, entered from the south via an antechamber through a distinctive double threshold made of large stone blocks into a forehall or antechamber. Within this antechamber, evidence of a burnt wooden anta (pillar) base was found, suggesting a framed and ornamented doorway. The final, formal entry into the main hall itself was marked by crossing a substantial threshold of poros stone, measuring 2.20 meters in length.

Inside the large main room (approximately 8.6 by 6.2 meters), the central focus was a rectangular hearth. Discovered as a dark, burnt discoloration in the cement floor, it measured about 2.40 by 1.65 meters. The lack of ash layers and the defined, uncemented rectangle led excavators to conclude a removable hearthstone.

Directly beneath this final structure are the remains of its predecessor, a substantial LBI (Late Bronze Age I, c. 16th–15th centuries BCE) building complex, often referred to as the "Mansion." The 1974–75 excavations in Trench ΠA dug by Mackenzie provided definitive stratigraphic proof that the Mycenaean Megaron was not a single-phase construction. The excavators found that the mansion's plaster floors were cut through and sealed by a thick layer of leveling fill (approximately 0.9 m), upon which the foundations of the later Megaron walls were built. Key finds from the Mansion levels include fragments of a Linear A tablet and environmental samples containing tephra from the Minoan eruption of Thera, providing both cultural and chronological anchors for this phase.

Beneath these two Bronze Age monumental layers, deep soundings (particularly Trench ΠC) revealed an earlier, continuous sequence of occupation. Underlying the Mansion are Middle Cycladic ("Second City") layers, which contained multiple series of plaster floors and associated walls. Below these are Early Cycladic ("First City") layers, featuring domestic installations such as hearths, storage bins, and infant burials in pithoi. The basal layer consists of Pre-City (Phase A) deposits resting directly on bedrock, representing the initial settlement at this location.

== Infant Burial ==
A recurring and significant feature of the Phylakopi excavations, both in the early 20th century and during the 1974–75 campaigns, has been the discovery of infant and fetal burials within the settlement.

Multiple burials of very young individuals were found stratified within the pre-Mycenaean occupational levels beneath the Megaron complex. Unlike the extramural cemeteries used for older children and adults at contemporary sites, these infants were interred beneath the floors of domestic structures. The 1974–75 excavations uncovered three such burials in secure archaeological contexts. These finds echoed the earlier work of Dawkins and Droop in 1911, who reported discovering eight child burials in pithoi placed in shallow hollows in the bedrock beneath the earliest house foundations. They described the skeletons as belonging to children, "some old enough for the second teeth to be beginning to appear."

The consistent method involved primary inhumation in a contracted position within a ceramic vessel. The vessels used were typically large storage jars (pithoi) or other substantial pots, which were often laid horizontally. In some instances, the mouth of the jar was sealed with another pot, such as a basin. The burials were carefully placed, sometimes with associated objects (like the jug and blades in ΠB or the special plaster setting in ΠC), indicating deliberate ritual activity rather than casual disposal.

Renfrew's analysis of its occurrence at Phylakopi across several centuries (Early to Middle Cycladic periods) suggests a persistent cultural tradition. Archaeologists interpret this as reflecting a distinct social and ritual status for infants, differentiating them from older members of the community who were buried outside the settlement. The placements beneath floors may represent foundation offerings for new buildings or protective household rituals, embedding the youngest deceased within the fabric of domestic life. These burials provide crucial, non-elite evidence for the social organization, beliefs about childhood, and ritual practices of the early inhabitants of Phylakopi

== Bronze Age ==
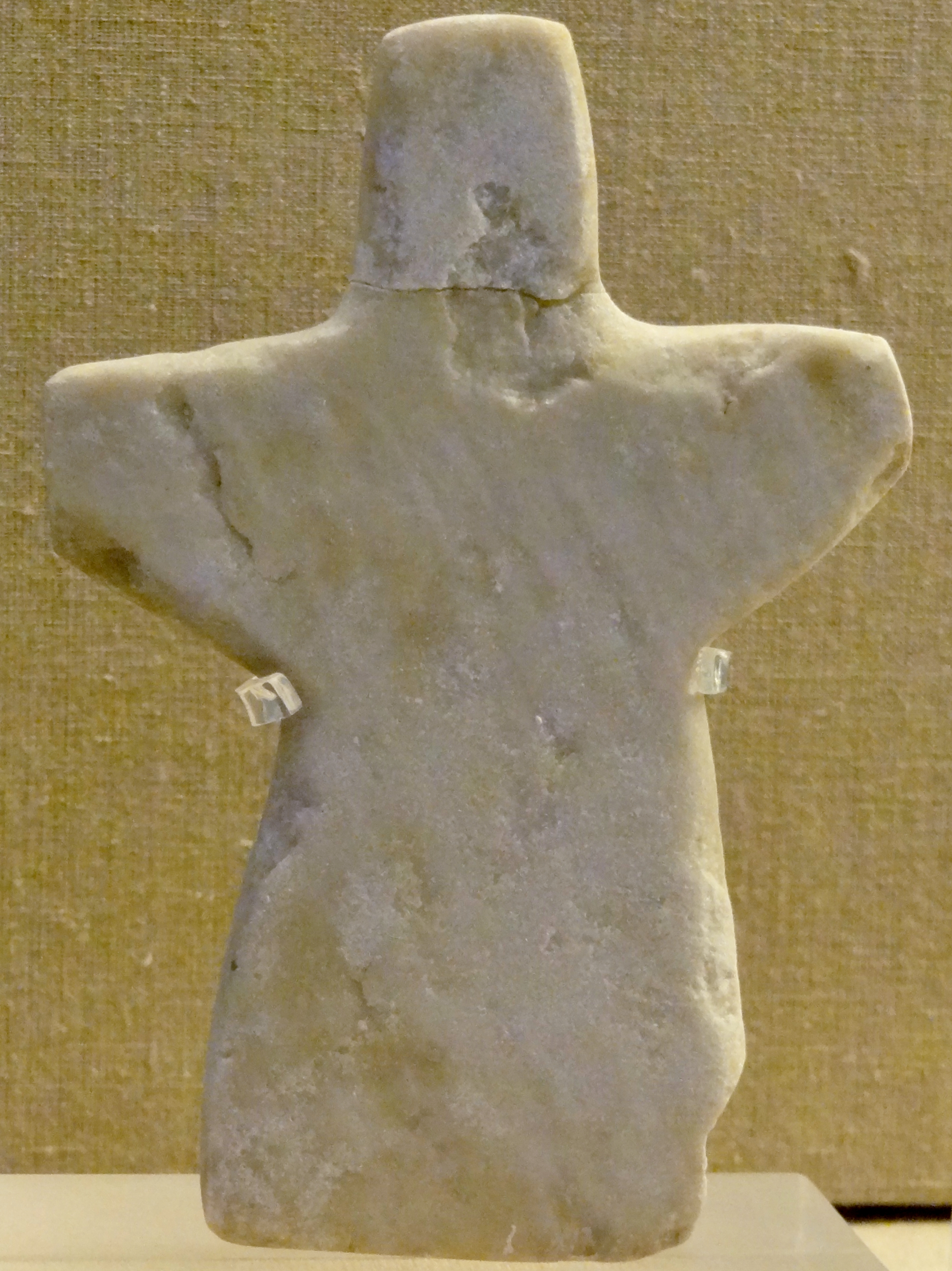
Phylakopi-style marble figurine, 2200–2000 BC. Prehistoric Museum of Fira, Thera

The earliest settlement at this site, founded directly on bedrock, was a small village with pottery characteristic of the early Bronze Age Grotta-Pelos culture.

=== Phylakopi I ===
The first phase of the site with substantial architecture (Phylakopi I: 2300-2000 B.C) dates from the middle of the Early Bronze Age to the middle of the Middle Bronze Age. The settlement grew throughout the Phylakopi I phase.

According to Jeremy B. Rutter, "The distribution of duck vases suggests that Phylakopi I is at least partially contemporary with later Anatolian EB 3 (Troy V)." Also there are some indications that Phylakopi I culture was influenced by the Keros-Syros culture, as well as by the "Lefkandi I" culture with western Anatolian affinities.

=== Phylakopi II ===
It is during the second phase (Phylakopi II: 2000-1550 BC) that the settlement flourishes and becomes a major player in the Cyclades. Phylakopi II was densely occupied, with blocks of houses separated by long, straight streets. This phase is famous for the Cycladic artistic flair as seen on several pottery styles, such as "Dark Burnished ware" and "Cycladic white". The vessels often contain stylised plant and animal motifs in black and red matt paint, though most famous are the Melian bird jugs exported to Knossos. Towards the end of the period increasing amounts of Minoan pottery were found at the site, marking the start of a period of "Minoanisation", which is more visible at the start of Phylakopi III.

=== Phylakopi III ===
The Phylakopi III (1550-1100 B.C) city was constructed after the complete destruction of Phylakopi II, most likely due to earthquake activity. The phase can be divided into three sub-phases.

Phylakopi III-i sees Minoan forms begin to become more popular. Research suggests several architectural features can be ascribed to this phase. One structure, called the 'Pillar Room', was constructed with pillars and ashlar blocks. The interior contained traces of a well-preserved fresco, which depicted a delightful flying fish.

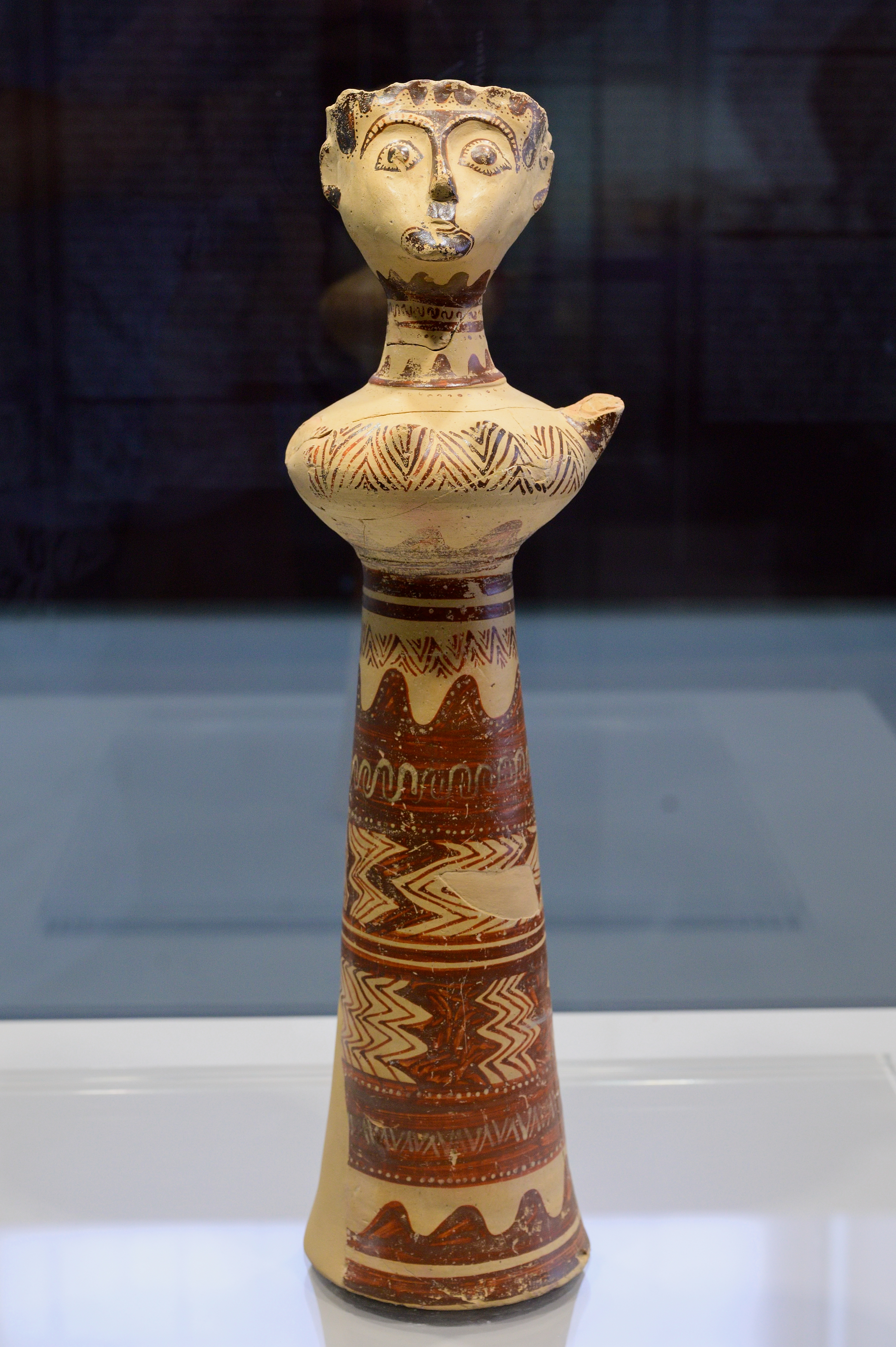
The Lady of Phylakopi. Wheel-made female figurine of a goddess or priestess from West Shrine in Phylakopi. Height 45 cm. Late Helladic III A period, Phylakopi III, probably 14th century BC. Archaeological Museum of Milos, Cat. no. B 655.

The so-called 'Mansion' likely served as an administrative centre for the settlement, owing to discovery of a Linear A tablet fragment found within the structure. The settlement also appears to have been walled during this period.

The pottery of Phylakopi III:i is heavily influenced by Minoan forms and motifs, which, along with Minoan influence in architecture, has led to the suggestion that Phylakopi was under the political control of the Minoans. In any case, Minoan ideas and culture became popular at this time within the elite circles in the Aegean and were adopted as a marker of social differentiation and "prestige".

==== Thera eruption ====
Phylakopi III:ii sees a regression of Minoan influence after the eruption of the Thera (Santorini) volcano in LM IA (c. 1500 B.C). The phase is lacking in identifiable architectural features, though much of the pottery discovered during the 1896-99 excavations was from this phase. Mycenaean influence first becomes perceptible, primarily through Mycenaean pottery.

Mycenaean influence becomes more prevalent in Phylakopi III:iii, with the construction of a megaron, a sanctuary with Mycenaean figurines, a new fortification wall and the predominance of Mycenaean pottery, to the almost extinction of Cycladic pottery styles. The construction of a megaron, a feature of the Mycenaean palaces of the Greek mainland, has led to the suggestion that the Mycenaeans conquered and administered the settlement.

== Sanctuary ==
In the summer of 1974, excavations at the site of Phylakopi in Melos were resumed on behalf of the British School of Archaeology at Athens after an interval of 63 years. The sanctuary was excavated at that time. It served as the community's central venue for religious activities such as worship, sacrifice and offerings. Numerous significant ritual artefacts were unearthed, including the renowned terracotta figurine of the goddess Philae, murals depicting natural and marine life, and stone altars.

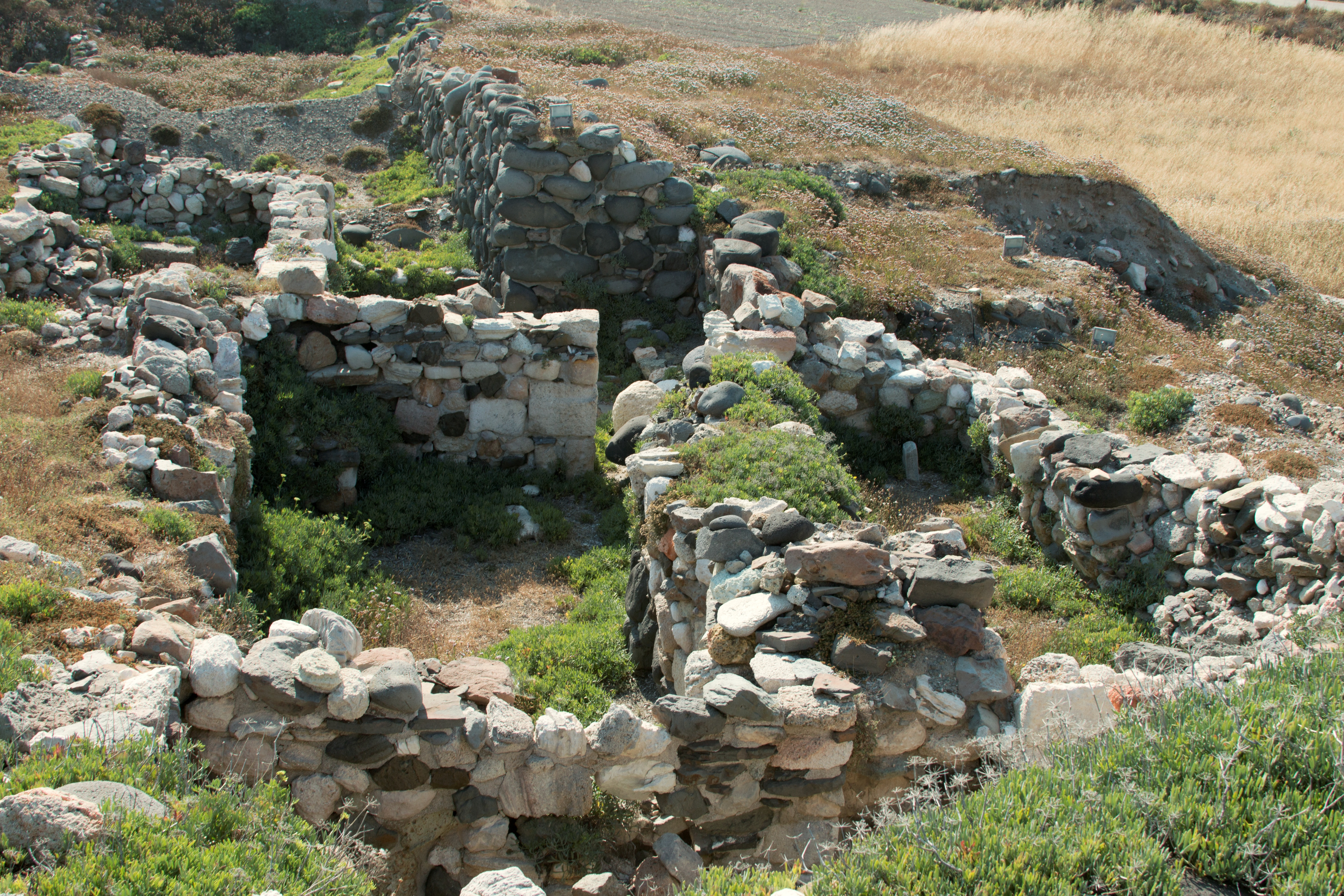
Phylakopi, the Sanctuary, Late Bronze Age

The earliest shrine building is West Shrine, including Rooms A and B lying to the west of the main room, during the Late Helladic IIIA Period. The entire complex was seriously damaged in the Late Helladic IIIC period, which is referred to as the ‘collapse’. The area in the West Shrine to the north of this wall, and the interior of the East Shrine, were re-used (phases 3a and 3b) and small structural additions were later made internally(phase 3c), following which the entire complex was finally abandoned, later in the Late Heliadic IIIC period.

Sanctuary in Phylakopi is a complex of buildings, comprising West Shrine, East Shrine, Rome A and Rome B. The walls of the sanctuary have been numbered(see above). The main central room, the West Shrine is 5.8 m north-south by 6 m east-west. Room A is 1.6m x 1.6m and Room B is 3.8m x 1.6m. The East Shrine is bit smaller, about 7m x 4m. As illustrated, this is a 3D model encompassing the fundamental characteristics of each period.

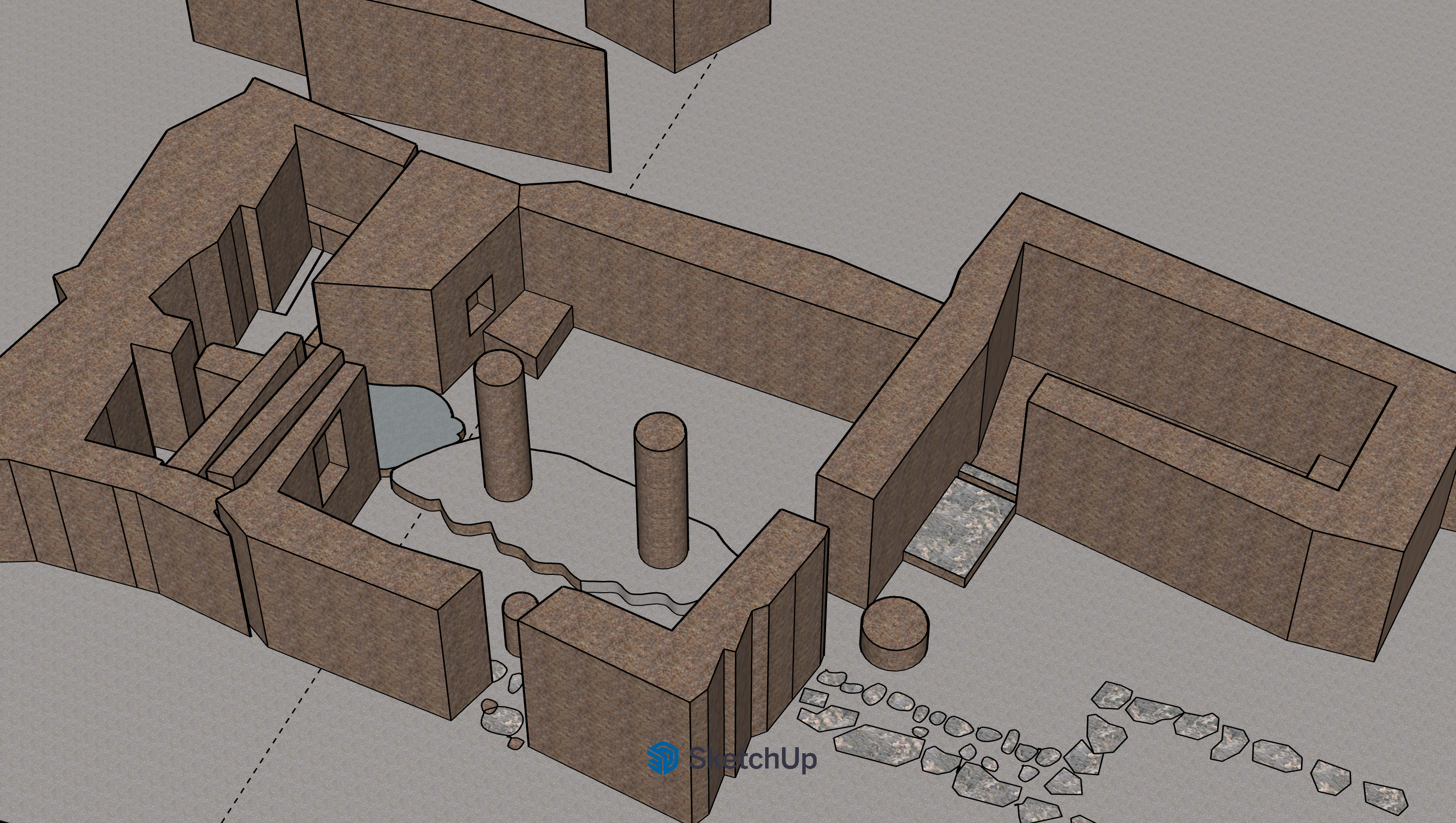
3D modlel of the sanctuary at Phylakopi

Although no remains of the West Shrine roof have been discovered, it can be inferred that the rooms were supported by central pillars. The presence of an altar platform and multiple sets of niches within the chamber suggests that ritual ceremonies were conducted there.

Numerous sculptures and artefacts were discovered within the sanctuary, enabling us to infer the purpose of the site and the nature of the religious ceremonies conducted there.

== Pillar Rooms Complex ==
=== Excavation ===
The Pillar Rooms Complex were discovered by Duncan Mackenzie at the end of the 1898 session with its first excavation completed in 1899. Subsequent excavation by Colin Renfrew in 1974-77 and confirms that while the complex was discovered in stratum two, they date to late Cycladic I-II. The Pillar Rooms Complex consists of four main spaces, the West, East, Central Rooms, and a large court which was later encroached by houses following City II destruction. While there was evidence of rebuilding in the Third City for the East and West Rooms, the Central Pillar Room’s stratigraphy does not match the other pillar rooms, with no evidence of rebuilding in the Third City. Built on top of earlier structures, the site has been in use since late Phylakopi I (Liii), though too few spaces were excavated to these levels for deeper understanding of earlier structures.

=== Layout ===
Measuring approximately 21 meters West to East, and 13 meters from North to South, the complex is one of the largest structures preserved from City II, and is in similar size to the LC III Megaron, which is accepted as the administrative focus at Phylakopi during later City III. Despite coastal erosion of the site, the Pillar Rooms Complex remains intact due to its considerably focal position, being located at the widest and axial street of the community. It is located on a locally high point of the central ridge, overlooking the entire eastern half of the site, on the only major public court known in City II.

Of the three rooms, the East Pillar Room has been of most interest due to its findings of an in-situ square pillar and numerous fresco fragments. While there exists a “confident ground plan preservation”, no entrance at ground level was found, instead, evidence for a u-plan staircase leading down to the East Pillar room suggests it was entered from above. This spatial typology of entrance from above, has relations to the Pillar Crypts of Neopalatial Crete. The existence of stairs gave rise to theories if the three rooms were connected at the upper storey. Whitelaw proposes two theories; the single-structure model with two staircases where all rooms are connected, or a two-structure model with three staircases, where the East and Central Pillar Rooms are connected in the upper storey, and the West had its own upper storey.

Unlike the East Pillar Room, the West Pillar Room has an entry point at ground level with a doorway that leads to a large court- the only major court known in the community. This spatial typology deviates from the norm of Phylakopi houses which were documented to have opened directly off into streets. Another deviation are the entrances in the Central and West room which opens directly into a room with a column, a common Cretan and Theran room type.

Findings at the West room includes five pierced pedestalled bowls at the base of the column, like those found on Crete used for pouring libations. These vessels unlike some variants of the shape were pierced so that liquids could drain through the upper bowl and also through the base. The location of these bowls led to interpretation as receptacles for offerings and libations. Other findings include broken vessels holding scarlet earth, which hypothesized by Bosanquet, to be possibly a pigment. Findings in the Central Pillar Room include an imported Neopalatial steatite lamp, fragments of a clay bovine rhyton, and an ivory volute. No evidence of a pillar could be found.

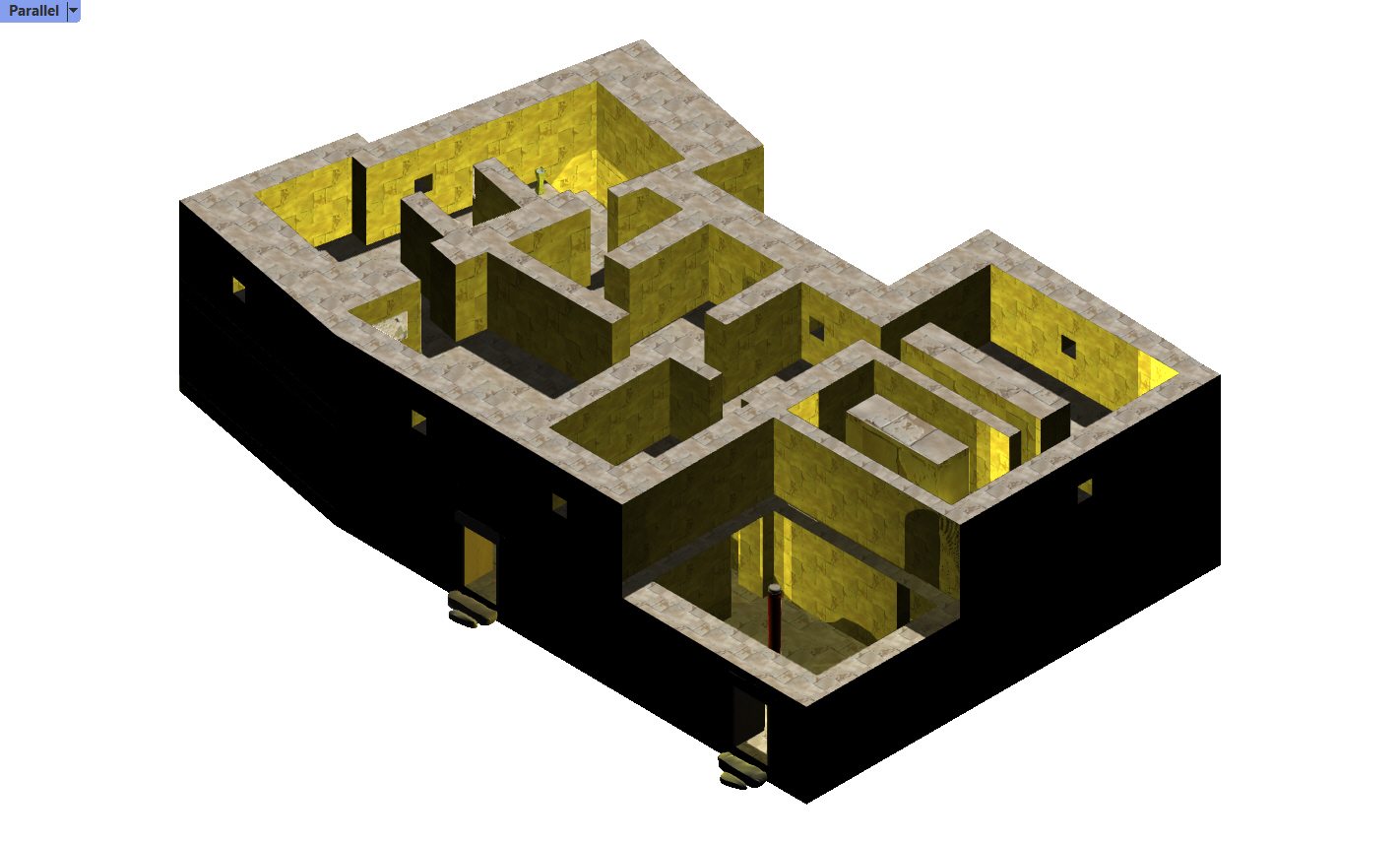
3D model of Pillar Rooms Complex in Phylakopi, first floor.

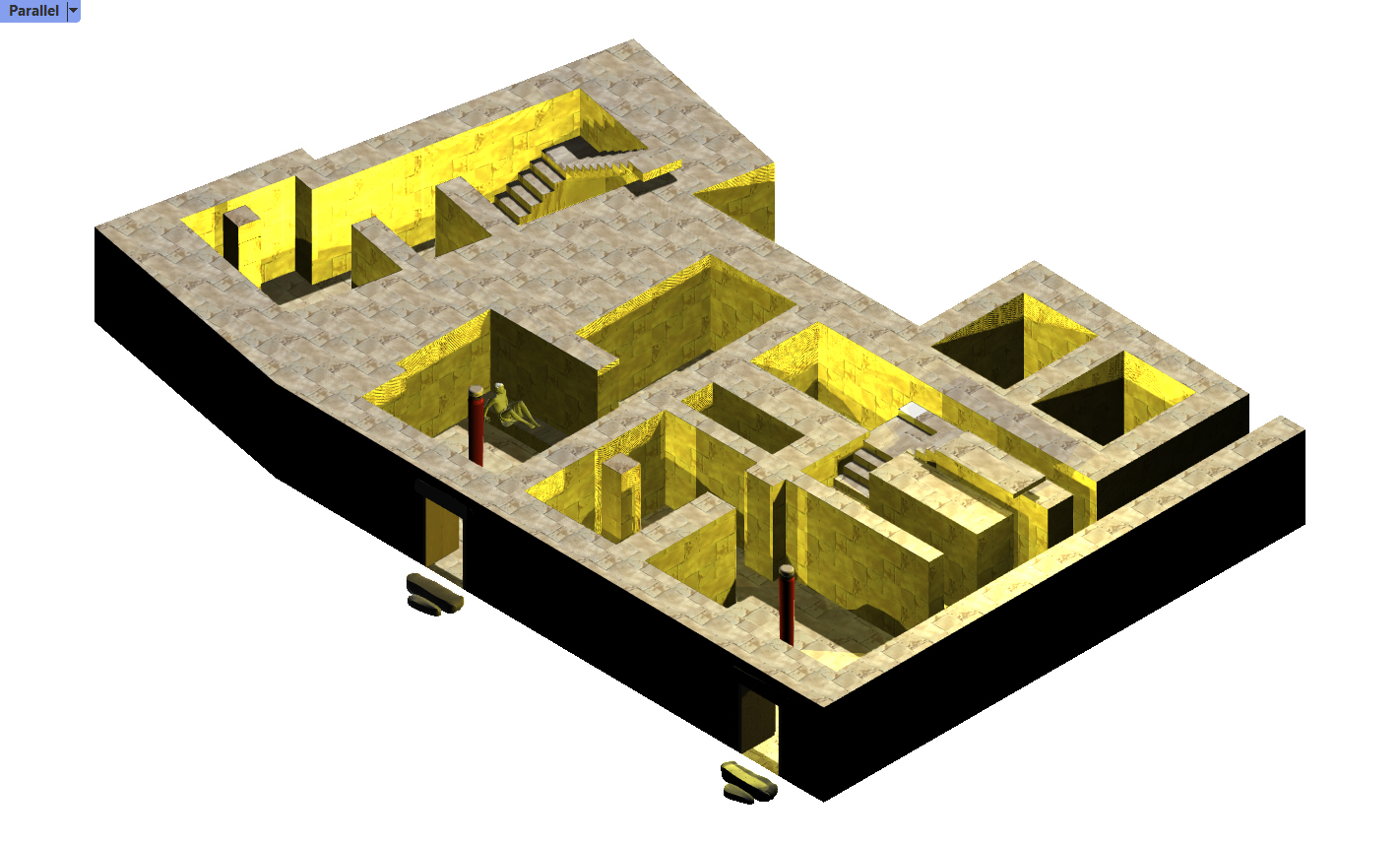
3D model of Pillar Rooms Complex in Phylakopi, ground floor.

=== Function ===
Function of the Pillar Rooms Complex remains speculative. Due to its location, scale, spatial and iconographic forms, scholars have speculated it to be a focal structure of the late Middle Cycladic as either an elite residence, a ritual complex, an administrative predecessor to the Megaron, or Phylakopi’s ‘early palace’ during City II.

Other clues towards function include the materiality of the complex. The complex’s wall which faced the public court, was constructed in part of roughly coursed, hammer-dressed blocks which suggests a relatively high investment in these structures, therefore indicating possible high status of its investors and occupants.

Following the Second City destruction, it is thought that the Pillar Rooms Complex no longer remained the focal point in the community. Instead, the focal point shifted to the LC I-LC II Mansion recognised in 1974-1977 by Renfrew to be underneath the Megaron.

=== Trench пs ===
Colin Renfrew’s excavations in 1974-77 opened trench пs in the East Pillar Room to investigate chronology of fresco fragments excavated in this vicinity by Mackenzie and colleagues in 1898-9. Mackenzie had attributed the fresco fragments to his Second City period (the MBA), however Sinclair Hood who excavated at Phylakopi with Renfrew suggested that he would prefer to assign them to the LB I period, and it was to test this hypothesis that trench пs was opened. Trench пs measures 2.5 m by 2.0 m and was excavated to the south-east of the East Pillar Room. Findings include a wall in the south-west corner was of Mycenaen date, and numerous fresco fragments in the western part of Trench пs.

Findings could be delineated into 2 main sections; LM IA/LH I: layers 17-23, LB IB/LH II: layers 4-16 and samples were taken to test for presence or absence of Theran tephra. It was confirmed that the find context for the fresco fragments is post-eruption but production may have been earlier. With fresco fragments found in LB Third City levels, and none in earlier strata, Renfrew redates the Pillar Rooms Complex from the MC City II to the LC I-LC II City III.

Пs covers only a corner of a room, and that LM IA-LM IB levels in the rest of the room remain unexcavated.

=== Pillars ===
The Pillar Rooms Complex was deemed as such due to its pillars that resembled ones found in Neo palatial Crete. Two monolithic square pillars of limestone were found in-situ in the East and West Rooms. At the West Room, the pillar consisted of one block that measures 1.35 m high, and in the East Room, the pillar consisted of two blocks. The lower block measured 0.60 m high and 0.58 m in the other two dimensions. It stood on a plinth of four stones, three flat large ones and one smaller. At the same time as the excavation of trench пs, a limited amount of cleaning was also carried out. It was discovered that the pillar in the East Pillar Room had unfortunately been pushed over to the west since Mackenzie and his colleagues first discovered at.

Function of the pillars have been debated. As the pillars are located more or less at the centre of these rooms, it suggests deliberate spatial practices and movement involving the pillars. Furthermore, the span of the rooms are not that wide, and could stand without pillars. Therefore, the pillars’ function could either be structural, an element of Minoan visual culture, or even religious relations similar to the pillar cult.

The rarity of pillars in Phylakopi’s built context further suggests the complex’s function and status. While several built piers were incorporated in City III structures, “no other pillars were identified in City II.” The uncommon pillars emphasize the exotic or exclusive status of the complex.

=== Friezes ===
Numerous fragments were discovered with various iconographic features such as flying fish, lilies, blue monkey, ‘festoon’ spiral, and rosettes. These fragments were nearly all found laying downwards on the floor and were “thin and very rotten,” in some cases, these fragments were curved, as if they had formed a cornice. The largest quantity of plaster was unpainted matt white, other colours in order of quantity from more to less include red, pink, blue, blue-grey, black, and yellow. Two different frieze applications of fresco and secco can be observed.

Of the fragments, the flying fish frieze has been physically reconstructed to considerably greater detail and are now displayed in the National Museum, Athens. Two compositions were constructed from fragments with varying height dimensions of 22 cm and 32 cm respectively, suggesting separate friezes. Even though the dimensions differ, the colours, technique and subject matter are the same in both friezes. The subject matter’s colour and disposition is an artistic representation of the Mediterranean flying fish. Morgan notes that there are two anatomical errors in the fish. The pectoral fin is depicted rounded with scalloped edges instead of tapering, and the large pelvic fin is omitted. Moreover, the exaggeration of the fin’s wing-like structure imparts a bird-like quality to the fish. Taking reference from Thera, the dimensions coincide with the category of miniature friezes which were usually placed about eye level at windows or doors. Theories regarding Cretan fresco production were also raised by Bosanquet, who observed that the fish friezes have smooth flat surfaces across the edges, which implies the possibility that they could have been enclosed in wooden frames after being ready-painted and exported from Knossos.

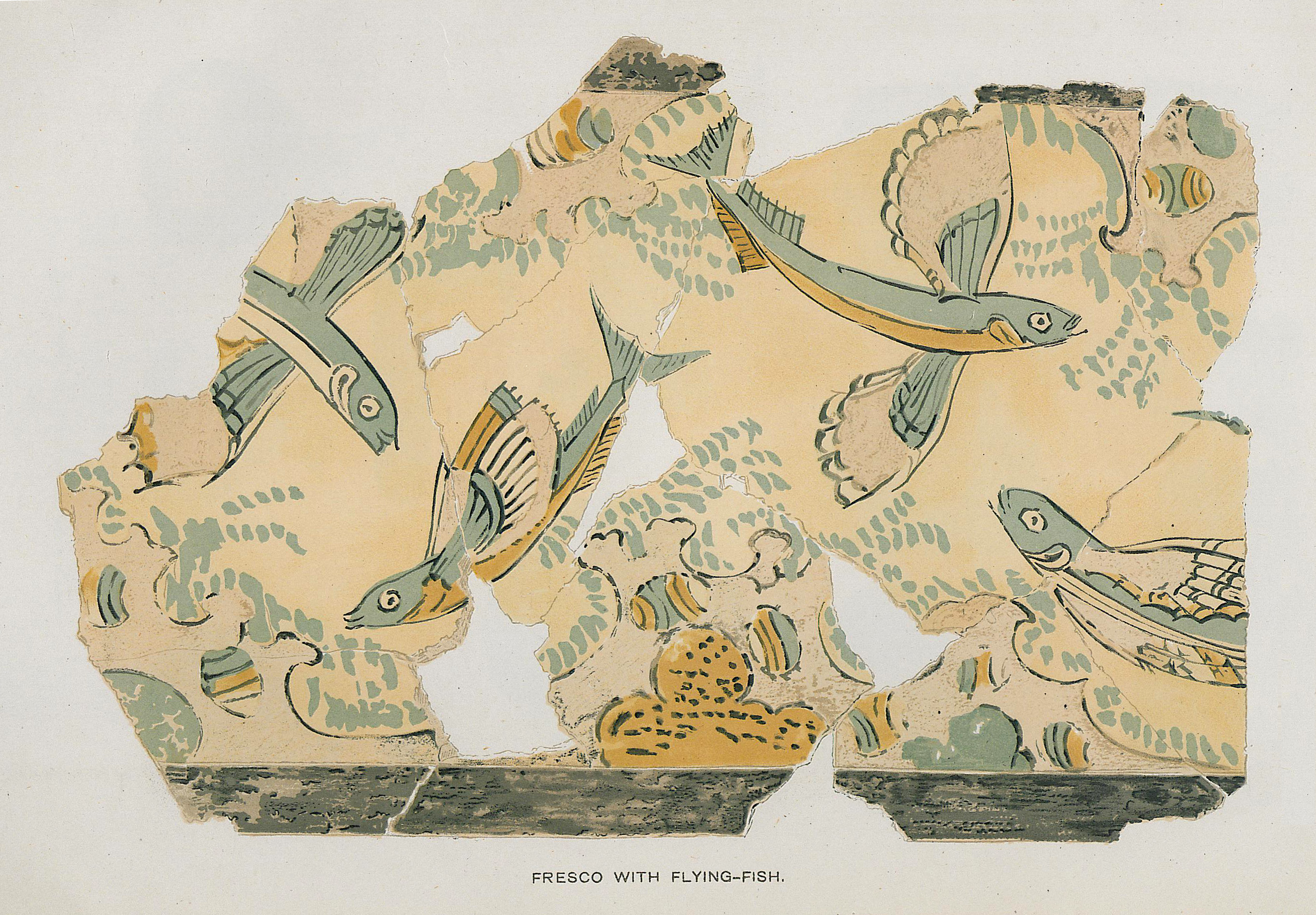
Watercolor of flying fish fresco from Phylakopi by Émile Gilliéron

In the next chamber south, were numerous pieces of stucco with red ground colour and a black bottom band with white lilies and yellow tipped stamens. It measures about 21 centimetres in height and hypothesized that they formed a long band. One single fragment of a blue monkey’s eye was also found. There is significance of the monkey as its iconography was also observed during this period in only Knossos and Thera, though there are stylistic differences with the Phylakopi monkey which was less realistic when compared with examples seen in Akrotiri, Thera, and the House of Frescoes, Knossos.

Other fragments include a presentation scene of woman with blue cloth and a woman with outstretched hands. Looking at the themes of the fragments comprehensively, they were defined as “particularly Cycladic” due to its juxtaposition of human cult activity with a scene from nature. This structural theme was also often employed by Theran artists but was less common outside of Thera.

Fragments were also found in the Western Pillar Room, but of lesser quantities. A fragment of stucco with red, blue, and black rosettes on a white ground were found at the South of the West Room.

=== Terminology Contentions ===
It might also be of interest to note contentions in terminology. Some scholars such as Renfrew term the complex as the “Pillar Crypt Area,” however some scholars such as Whitelaw prefer the term “Pillar Rooms Complex” instead, stating that the term “pillar crypt” carries implications associated with typology that links it to storage and spatially connected to a hall, which is not the case in Phylakopi.

== See also ==
- Phylakopi I culture
- History of the Cyclades
- Cycladic art
- Goulandris Museum of Cycladic Art
- Archaeological Museum of Milos
