= Eckel Industries =

Acoustics noise control company that makes anechoic chambers

- Company type: Private
- Industry: Materials and Industrial Design
- Founded: 1952 in Cambridge, Massachusetts
- Founder: Oliver C. Eckel
- Headquarters: Cambridge, Massachusetts
- Products: Acoustic control materials and engineering
- Website: eckelusa.com

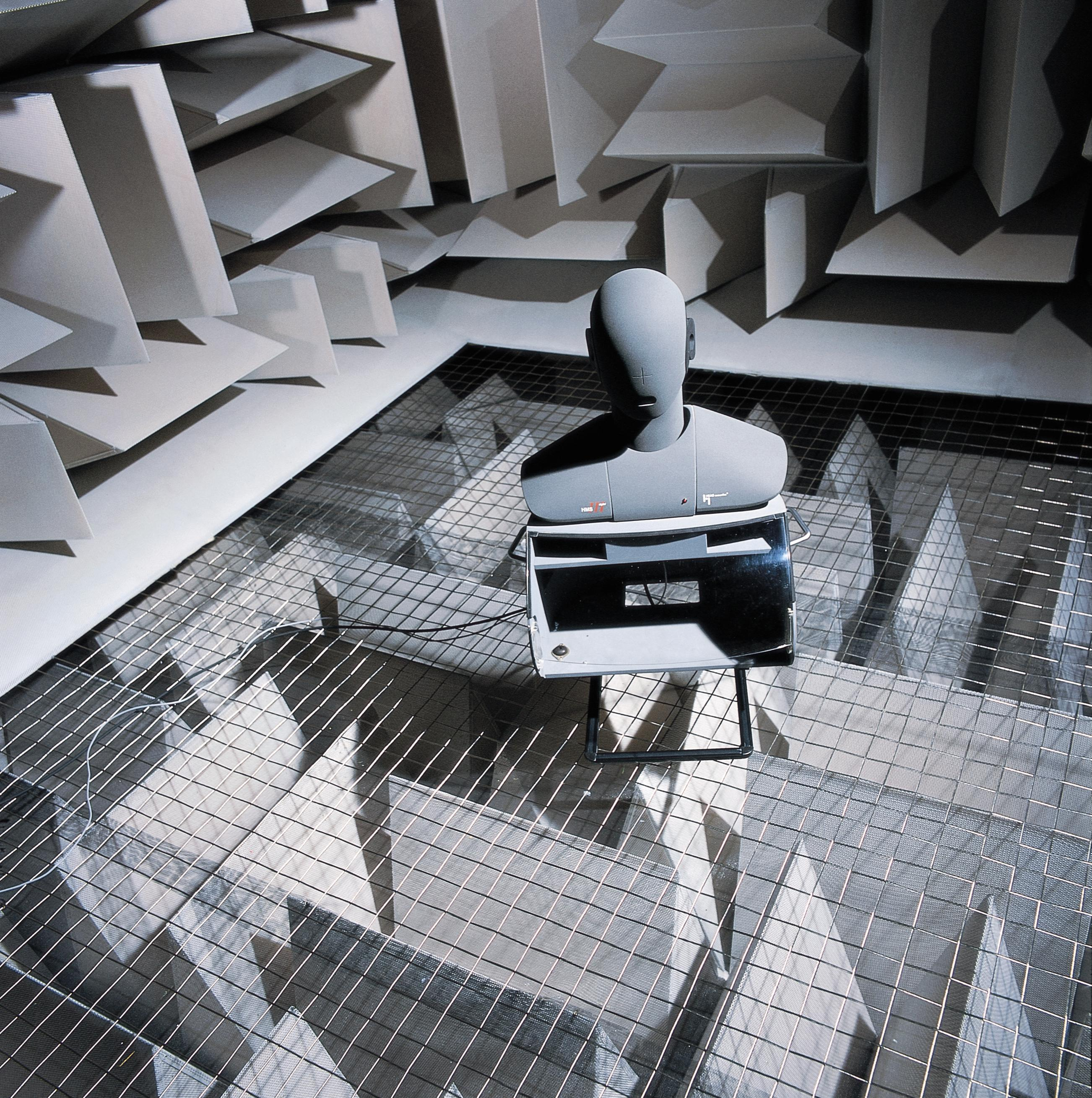
An Eckel Industries fully anechoic chamber

Eckel Industries is an acoustics noise control company founded 1952 in Cambridge, Massachusetts. The company engineers and constructs anechoic (echo-free) sound chambers.

== Notable projects ==
- Largest anechoic chamber ever constructed at General Electric in Pittsfield, Massachusetts
- World's quietest room, located at Orfield Labs in Minneapolis, Minnesota. The Orfield Labs chamber was certified by the Guinness Book of World Records in 2005 as the quietest room on Earth.
- The Eckel anechoic chamber located at Microsoft in Redmond, Washington was certified by the Guinness Book of World Records as the quietest place on earth in 2015, measuring -20.6 dB.
