= John Eccles =

John or Jack Eccles may refer to:

- John Eccles (neurophysiologist) (1903–1997), Australian neurophysiologist and Nobel laureate
- John Eccles (composer) (1668–1735), English composer
- John Eccles, 2nd Viscount Eccles (born 1931), British businessman
- John Eccles (Royal Navy officer) (1898–1966), Commander-in-Chief, Home Fleet 1955–1958
- John Scott Eccles, a fictional character and the client of Sherlock Holmes in "The Adventure of Wisteria Lodge"
- Jack Eccles (footballer) (1869–1932), English footballer with Stoke
- Jack Eccles (trade unionist) (1922–2010), British trade unionist
- John Eccles (mayor) ((c.1664–1727), Lord mayor of Dublin in 1710

== See also ==
- John Echols (1823–1896), Confederate Army general
- Johnny Echols (born 1947), musician
