= Edith Eccles =

British classical archaeologist

- Born: 8 October 1910; Liverpool
- Died: 24 June 1977 (aged 66)
- Education: Royal Holloway, University of London
- Known for: Excavations at Knossos and Arkalochori
- Awards: Mary Paul Collins Scholarship in Archaeology, Bryn Mawr College
- Scientific career
- Fields: Archaeology
- Workplaces: British School at Athens; Bryn Mawr College

Edith Eccles (8 October 1910 in Liverpool – 24 June 1977) was a British classical archaeologist who did work at the British School at Athens and worked with Sir Arthur Evans at Knossos on Crete in the 1930s. She studied at Royal Holloway, University of London.

== Career ==
During the 1930s she was a friend of Mercy Money-Coutts who worked and travelled with her in Greece and beyond. She remained active after the diagnosis of multiple sclerosis that ultimately ended her life.

In 1935, Eccles assisted the archaeologist Spyridon Marinatos with excavations at the cave sanctuary of Arkalochori. She maintained a strong professional relationship with Marinatos throughout her life, which is documented through letters published in 2015.

In 1936, Eccles attended Bryn Mawr College as the Mary Paul Collins Fellow in Archaeology. At that time, she worked on illustrations for Arthur Evans's publication of their excavations at Knossos. Eccles studied Greek Archaeology under Mary Hamilton Swindler, whilst researching gems and seal stones of the Late Minoan and Mycenean periods.

== Selected works ==
- Eccles, Edith. "The Seals and Sealings." Annual of the British School at Athens vol. 40(1940): 43–49.
- Hutchinson, R. W., Edith Eccles and Sylvia Benton. "Unpublished Objects from Palaikastro and Praisos. II." The Annual of the British School at Athens, vol. 40(1939): 38–59. .
