= Graduate of Pharmacy =

Obsolete academic pharmacy degree

The Graduate of Pharmacy (Ph.G.) is an obsolete academic pharmacy degree. It was superseded by the Bachelor of Pharmacy degree (B.Pharm.) in the early part of the 20th century.
