= Duncan Mackenzie =

Scottish archaeologist (1861–1934)

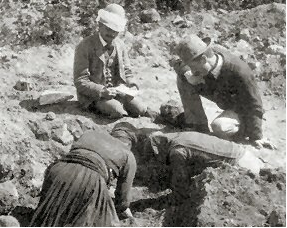
- Duncan Mackenzie is the man kneeling at the edge of the trench to the right.
- Born: 17 May 1861; Aultgowrie, Urray, Scotland
- Died: 25 August 1934 (aged 73); Pesaro, Italy
- Citizenship: British
- Education: University of Edinburgh (First Class); University of Vienna (PhD)
- Known for: Detailed daily records of important excavations, especially Knossos
- Scientific career
- Fields: Archaeology
- Workplaces: British School at Athens; Palestine Exploration Fund
- Thesis: Der Westfries von Gjölbaschi
- Doctoral advisor: Otto Benndorf

Duncan Mackenzie (17 May 1861 – 25 August 1934) was a Scottish archaeologist who assisted Arthur Evans in his excavations of the Minoan palace at Knossos.

== Early biography ==
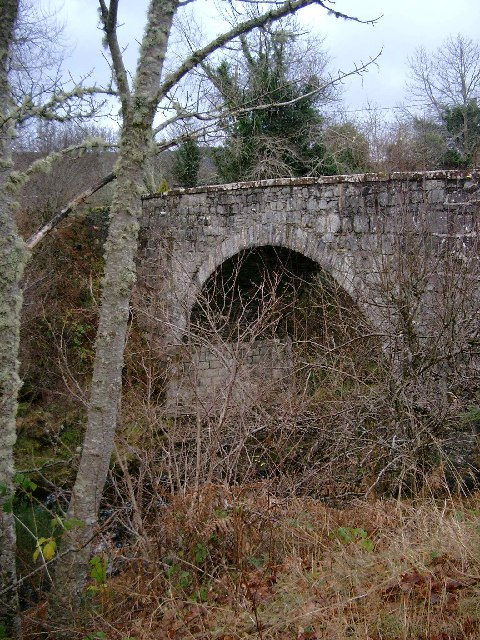
The old bridge at Aultgowrie

Duncan MacKenzie was born on 17 May 1861 in the small Gaelic-speaking village of Aultgowrie, just outside Muir of Ord, near to Inverness. He was the fourth of nine children born to Margaret Kennedy MacKenzie and Alexander MacKenzie, who worked as gamekeeper of the Fairburn Estate. The family spoke Gaelic at home, but the children were required to learn English when they went to school.

Mackenzie studied philosophy at the University of Edinburgh and received his PhD from Vienna in classical archaeology.

== Professional career ==
Appointed field supervisor of the excavation of Phylakopi by the British School at Athens, he worked closely with a team of professional archaeologists including Arthur Evans and David George Hogarth. They were investigating the provenance of Mycenaean pottery as defined by Heinrich Schliemann. After a few years they realised that Phylakopi was not going to yield that information. The evidence pointed toward Crete. Evans and Hogarth left Phylakopi, while MacKenzie stayed on to wind the excavation down.

Within a few years the secession of Crete from the Ottoman Empire opened opportunities to excavate there. Hogarth was the first to discover it. He sent for Evans immediately, as the Phylakopi crew had been a very close-knit team. Purchasing the land at Knossos, Evans began excavation, sending for the third member of the team, MacKenzie, who took up his old position as supervisor of excavation. In her book on the Evans family (of which she was the latest member, being Arthur's half-sister), Time and Chance, Joan Evans gives this verbal portrait of MacKenzie in his prime:

Mackenzie was a Scot with an inaudible Highland voice, a brush of red hair, an uncertain temper, a great command of languages, and great experience in keeping the records of an excavation. Arthur Evans recognised his gifts, and endured his suspicious temper and his valetudinarian ways with exemplary patience.

Hogarth left for other excavations and then other careers, but Evans and MacKenzie collaborated so closely on the excavation of Knossos and theorisation about it that the ideas of the two men are not distinguishable from each other. MacKenzie kept the day book, or log of daily discoveries and served as a middle man between Evans and the inhabitants of Crete. MacKenzie also wrote contributions of his own. The British connotation of "assistant" does not convey the true relationship. A PhD and professional archaeologist in his own right, MacKenzie was every bit the peer of Evans, His position as second-in-command was only a social convention. The two would work together for the next thirty years, long after the excavation was complete (1905). MacKenzie remained as curator of the site, taking up residence in the new Villa Ariadne constructed as headquarters in 1906 on the hill above the site. Prior to then the archaeologists resided and worked in a Turkish house below the site, which leaked apparently irreparably and provided difficult access to the site.

== Later life ==
According to Evans, Mackenzie came to suffer from severe alcoholism and could not only no longer function as curator, but was fast declining into a demented state. Evans placed him in an institution, where he died not long after. Joan Evans reports that Mackenzie had become very difficult to work with during the latter years of his curatorship because of "the gradual onset of his illness." It has also been said that Evans found Mackenzie one night passed out on a table and fired him the next day. Friends of Mackenzie disputed this, saying he did not drink. Whether the problem was alcoholism, denied for some reason by his family, or one of the brain disorders often inflicting the elderly, which Duncan then was, or some combination, Joan adds that he died in a state of "mental aberration."

Mackenzie died in Pesaro, Italy on 25 August 1934.

== See also ==
- Linear B
- Mycenaean pottery
