= Freemasons' Tavern =

Meeting place in England

Coordinates: 51.5156°N 0.1205°W

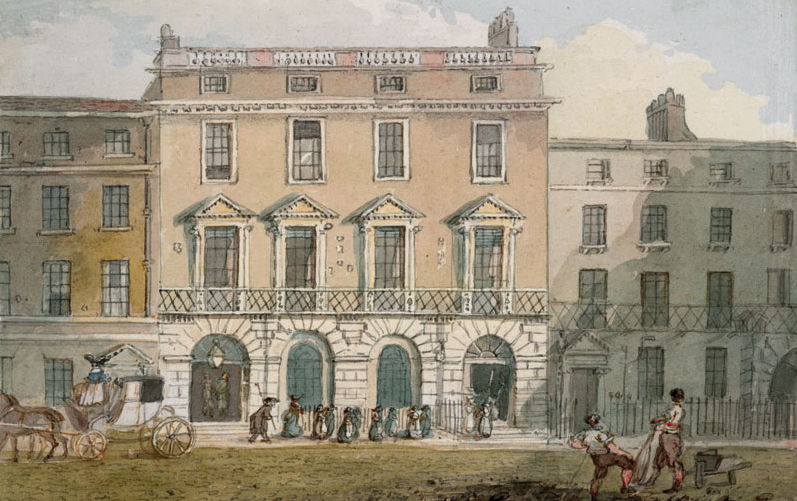
Watercolour of the Freemasons' Tavern by John Nixon circa 1800

The Freemasons' Tavern was established in 1775 at 61–65 Great Queen Street in the West End of London. It served as a meeting place for a variety of notable organisations from the 18th century until it was demolished in 1909 to make way for the Connaught Rooms.

== History ==
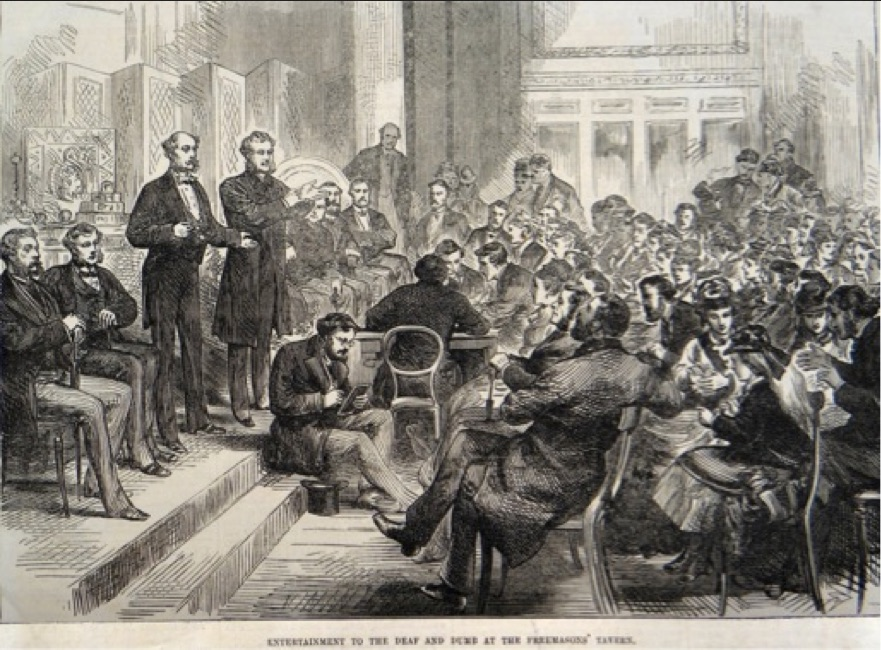
Meeting in the Hall of the Freemason's Tavern, London with sign language for deaf and mute people, published in the Illustrated London News, 23 January 1875

In 1769, the Premier Grand Lodge of England decided to build a Central Hall. A building was purchased in Great Queen Street in 1775 and Thomas Sandby was tasked with building a hall in the garden. The original house became the tavern with a second house providing office space for the Freemasons. In 1813 the Premier Grand Lodge and rival Ancient Grand Lodge of England merged to form the United Grand Lodge of England.

The hall was not only used for Masonic purposes, but also became an important venue in London for a variety of meetings and concerts. Organisations using the hall included:

- Political Economy Club
- African Institution
- British and Foreign Anti-Slavery Society, for the World Anti-Slavery Convention in 1840
- British and Foreign Bible Society
- Fund for the Relief of the Suffering Clergy of France in the British Dominions
- Highland and Island Emigration Society
- The Football Association (FA) held its first meeting here on 26 October 1863
- Geological Society of London was founded here in 1807

== Connaught Rooms ==
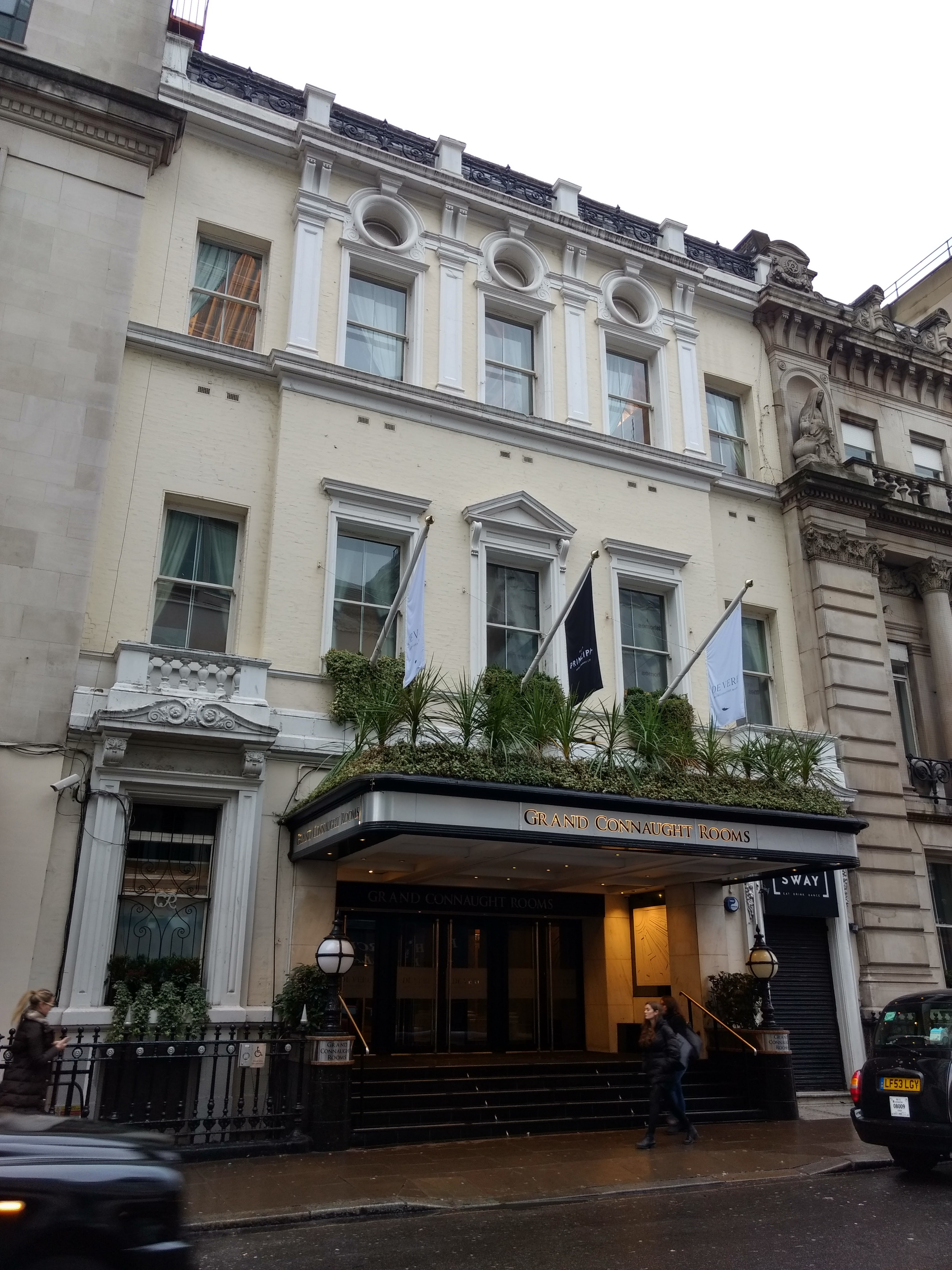
Grand Connaught Rooms main entrance, 2017

In 1909 the Grand Lodge demolished most of the Freemasons' Tavern and replaced it over succeeding decades with a new building designed by H. V. Ashley and Winton Newman, who also designed the adjoining Freemasons' Hall. The new building, costing £30,000, was named the Connaught Rooms after the Lodge's Grand Master, Prince Arthur, Duke of Connaught and Strathearn.

After a further renovation by Friendly Hotels (later the Real Hotel Company) in the 1980s it reopened as the New Connaught Rooms, a hotel and conference centre. The art deco Grand Hall can seat 800 conference delegates. When the Real Hotel Company collapsed in 2009, Principal Hayley Group bought the venue, renamed it the Grand Connaught Rooms, and in 2016 placed it in its De Vere brand. In 2010 it became Grade II* listed.

== External sites ==
- Official website
