= Mordaunt Doll =

English cricketer

Personal information
- Full name: Mordaunt Henry Caspers Doll
- Born: 5 April 1888; Camberwell, London
- Died: 30 June 1966 (aged 78); Devizes, Wiltshire
- Batting: Right-handed
- Relatives: Christian Doll (brother)

Domestic team information
- Years: Team
- 1907–1920: Marylebone Cricket Club
- 1908: Cambridge University
- 1907–1909: Hertfordshire
- 1912–1919: Middlesex

Career statistics
Competition	First-class
Matches	43
Runs scored	1,097
Batting average	18.59
100s/50s	1/0
Top score	102*
Balls bowled	1,034
Wickets	15
Bowling average	43.66
5 wickets in innings	1
10 wickets in match	0
Best bowling	5/52
Catches/stumpings	32/–
- Source: , 19 December 2018

Mordaunt Henry Caspers Doll (5 April 1888 – 30 June 1966) was an English first-class cricketer.

The son of Charles Fitzroy Doll, he was educated at Charterhouse School where he excelled as a schoolboy cricketer between 1905 and 1907. He scored 195 runs against Westminster School in his final year at school as he and RLL Braddell put on a stand of 214 in the last hour. From Charterhouse he went up to Trinity College, Cambridge.

He was a hard hitting right-handed batsman who represented MCC (1907–1920), Cambridge University (1908), Demobilised Officers (1919), Etceteras XI (1910), Hertfordshire (1907–1909), Middlesex (1912–1919) and PF Warner's XI (1919).

Doll scored 102 not out in a county record eighth wicket stand of 182 in two hours with Joe Murrell for Middlesex against Nottinghamshire at Lord's in 1913. He toured the West Indies in 1912/1913 with an MCC team led by Arthur Somerset.

His brother, Christian, was also a first-class cricketer.
