= Grand Central Hotel (Glasgow) =

Hotel in Glasgow, Scotland

voco Grand Central Glasgow
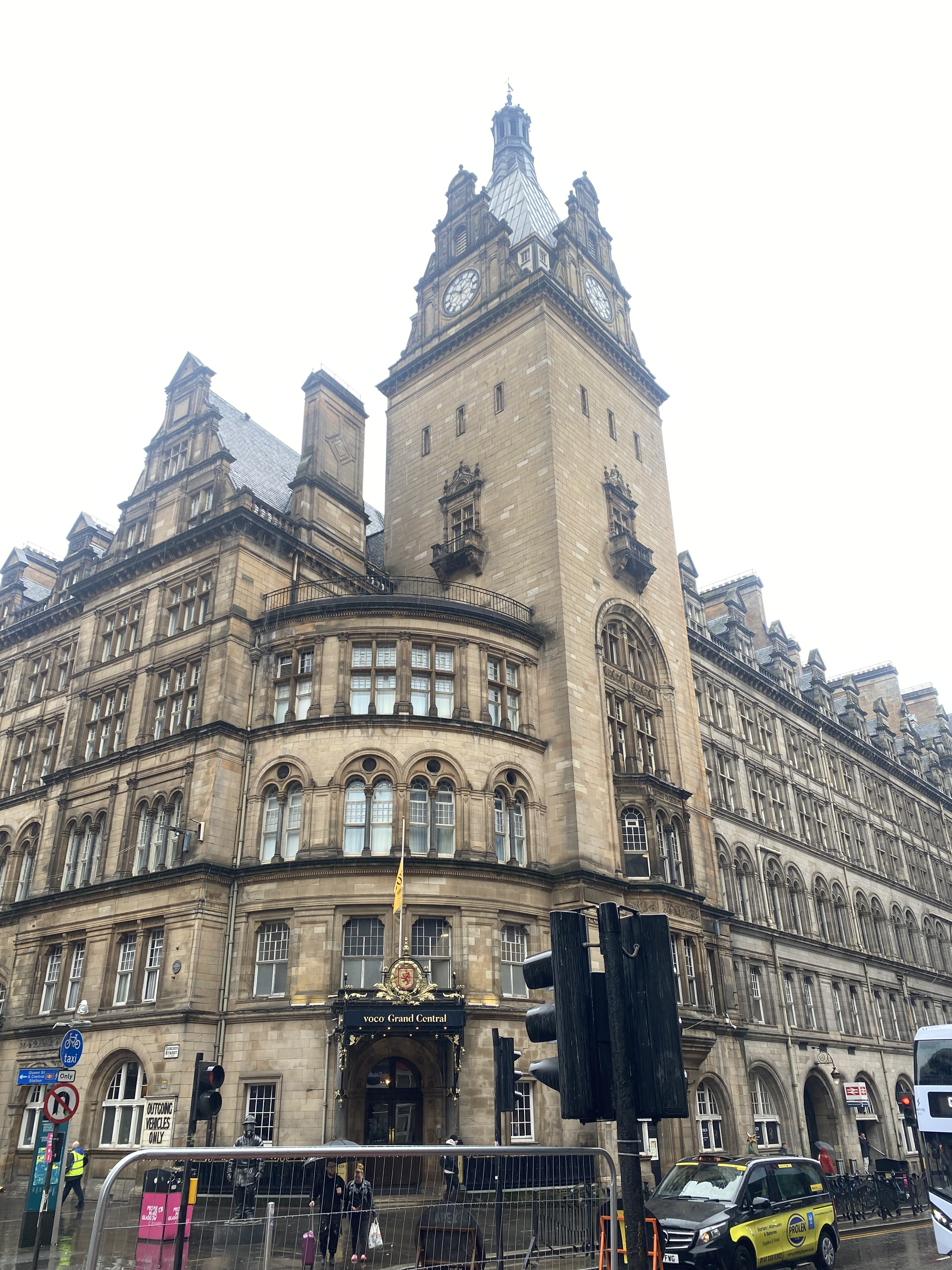
- voco Grand Central Hotel
- Interactive map of the voco Grand Central Glasgow area

General information
- Location: Glasgow, Scotland
- Coordinates: 55°51′35″N 4°15′29″W
- Opening: 1883
- Owner: IHG

Design and construction
- Architect: Robert Rowand Anderson

Other information
- Number of restaurants: 2

Website
- grandcentral.vocohotels.com

The voco Grand Central Glasgow (usually known by locals by its former name, the Central Hotel) is a large 4-star hotel in the centre of Glasgow, Scotland.

The hotel forms the front of the Glasgow Central railway station on Gordon Street, directly adjoining onto the station concourse. It was one of Glasgow's most prestigious hotels in its heyday, hosting residents such as John F. Kennedy, Frank Sinatra, Winston Churchill, Gene Kelly and Laurel and Hardy.

== History ==
The hotel was designed by Robert Rowand Anderson, in 'Queen Anne style'; he also furnished the public rooms. The hotel was constructed by the Caledonian Railway and was completed in 1883 as the Central Station Hotel. It was extended, along with the station, in 1901–1906. The hotel extension was designed by James Miller and it opened on 15 April 1907. It was later renamed the Central Hotel. The world's first long-distance television pictures were transmitted to the hotel on 24 May 1927 by John Logie Baird.

Following the break-up of British Transport Hotels in the early 1980s, the hotel was sold in 1983 and passed through the hands of various private operators. It was operated by Choice Hotels International for many years as the Quality Hotel Central Glasgow. In February 2009, The Real Hotel Company plc was forced into administration, and the hotel subsequently closed amid concerns of asbestos contamination and structural deterioration.

In June 2009, it was revealed that Principal Hayley Group had acquired the hotel. They refurbished it and re-opened it as the Grand Central Hotel on 9 September 2010. Together with the rest of Glasgow Central railway station, the hotel is protected as a category A listed building.

Principal hotel company was sold to InterContinental Hotels Group in 2018. The hotel closed in 2020 for an extensive renovation and was rebranded within IHG's voco chain as voco Grand Central Glasgow. It reopened on 26 April 2021.

On 8 March 2026, an adjoining building was destroyed in a major fire. Senior fire officer David Farries and council leader Susan Aitken both credited firefighters with preventing the fire spreading to the station and hotel. Due to the fire cordon the hotel was closed and reopened in June 2026.
