= Kimpton Fitzroy London Hotel =

Hotel in Russell Square, London

Kimpton Fitzroy London
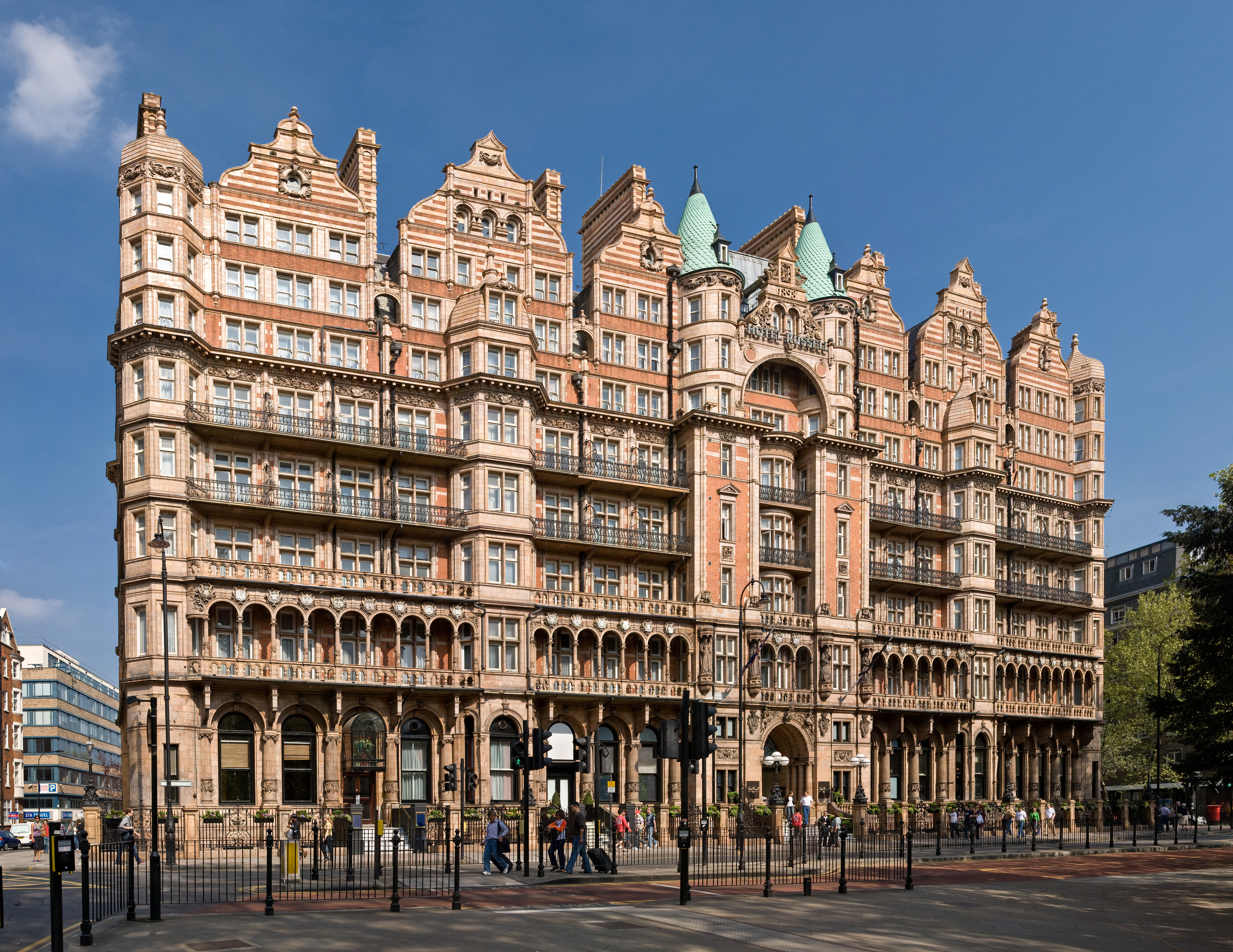
- Interactive map of the Kimpton Fitzroy London area
- Hotel chain: Kimpton Hotels & Restaurants

General information
- Location: Russell Square, London, UK
- Coordinates: 51.5227°N 0.1250°W
- Opened: 1900; 126 years ago
- Owner: Covivio Hotels
- Operator: InterContinental Hotels Group

Design and construction
- Architect: Charles Fitzroy Doll

Other information
- Number of rooms: 334

Website
- www.kimptonfitzroylondon.com

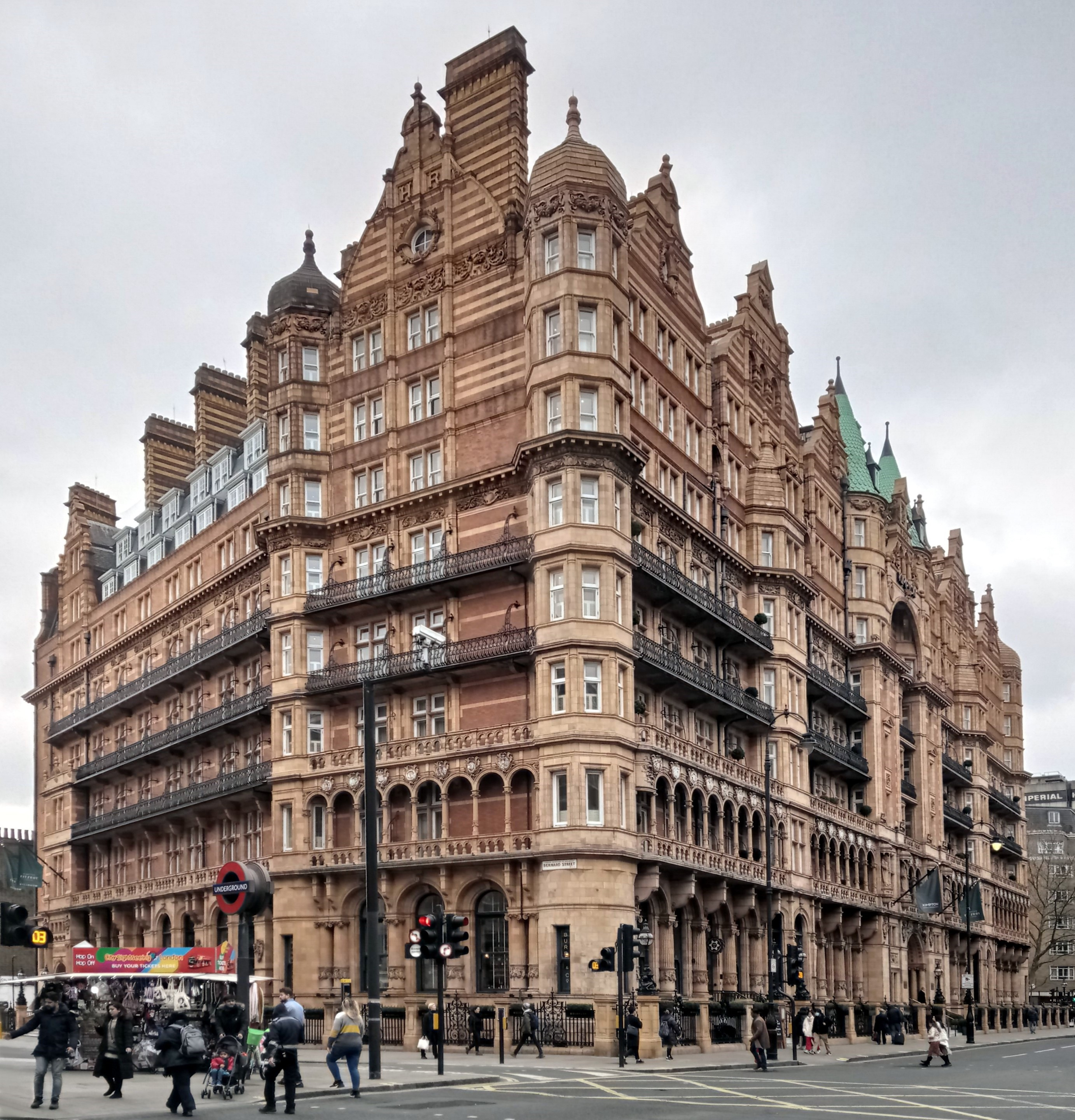
The hotel seen from Woburn Place

The Kimpton Fitzroy London is a historic five-star hotel, located on Russell Square, Bloomsbury, in the London Borough of Camden. From its opening in 1900 until 2018, it was known as the Hotel Russell.

== History ==
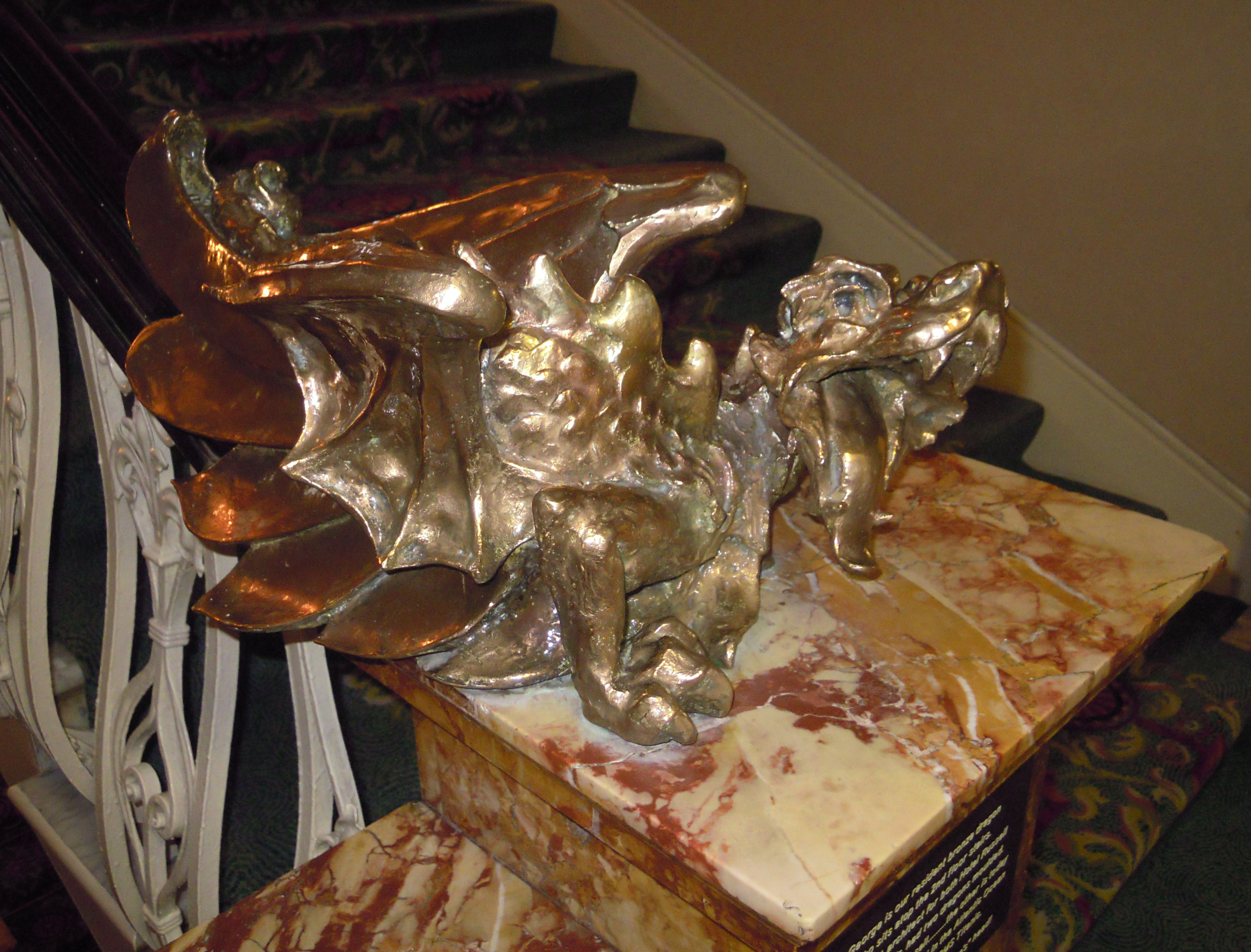
"Lucky George"

The Hotel Russell was built in 1898 by the architect Charles Fitzroy Doll and opened in 1900. It is distinctively clad in decorative thé-au-lait ("tea with milk") terracotta and was based on the Château de Madrid near the Bois de Boulogne in Paris.

Its restaurant, which was originally named after the architect but is now called Fitz's, is said to be almost identical to the RMS Titanic's dining room, which he designed. Also in the hotel is "Lucky George", a bronze dragon on the second floor stairs. An identical copy was on the Titanic.

Known for its palatial design, the hotel's fixtures and fittings included an ornate Pyrenean marble staircase and an interior sunken garden. Each room was fitted with an en-suite bathroom, a great innovation at the time. A sister hotel by the same architect, the Imperial Hotel, was also built on Russell Square, but it was demolished in the late 1960s.

The life-size statues of four Queens – Elizabeth I, Mary II, Anne and Victoria – above the main entrance were the work of the sculptor Henry Charles Fehr. The façade, by Doll, incorporates the coats of arms of the world's nations (as they were in 1898) in the spandrels of the first floor.

The hotel was one of the few that were not taken over by the War Office during the Second World War. It survived the war largely intact, but the magnificent dome that stood on the roof was badly damaged in an air raid of 1941 and not replaced.

The Russell Group of universities is named after Hotel Russell, where the first informal meetings took place.

On 16 April 2018, the hotel reopened as The Principal London after an extensive renovation by the Principal Hotel Company. In July 2018, the Principal Hotel Company sold 12 hotels in its portfolio (including The Principal London) to Covivio Hotels, which then licensed their management to InterContinental Hotels Group. The hotel was renamed the Kimpton Fitzroy London on 24 October 2018.

The interior features contemporary design by lead designer Tara Bernerd & Partners. The bedrooms are decorated with a design by British textile artist Kit Miles.

== In popular culture ==
The Hotel Russell is mentioned in Andrew Lloyd Webber's musical Cats during the song "The Journey to the Heaviside Layer".

The Hotel Russell is used as a location in the 1981 miniseries Kessler.

The Kimpton Fitzroy London appeared on Top Chef: World All-Stars as the accommodation of the season's contestants.

== Gallery ==
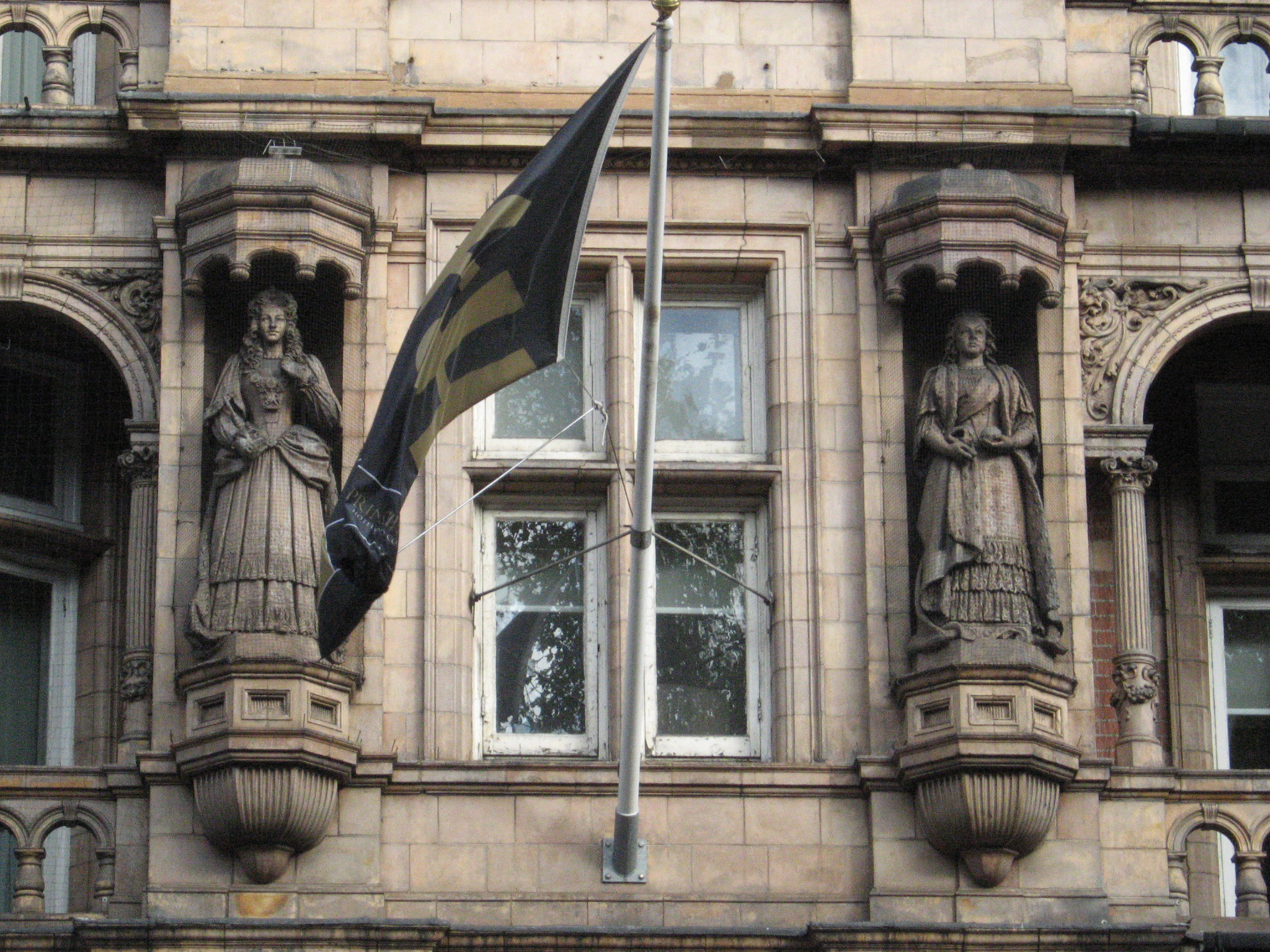
Statues of British Queens on the Hotel Russell by Henry Charles Fehr

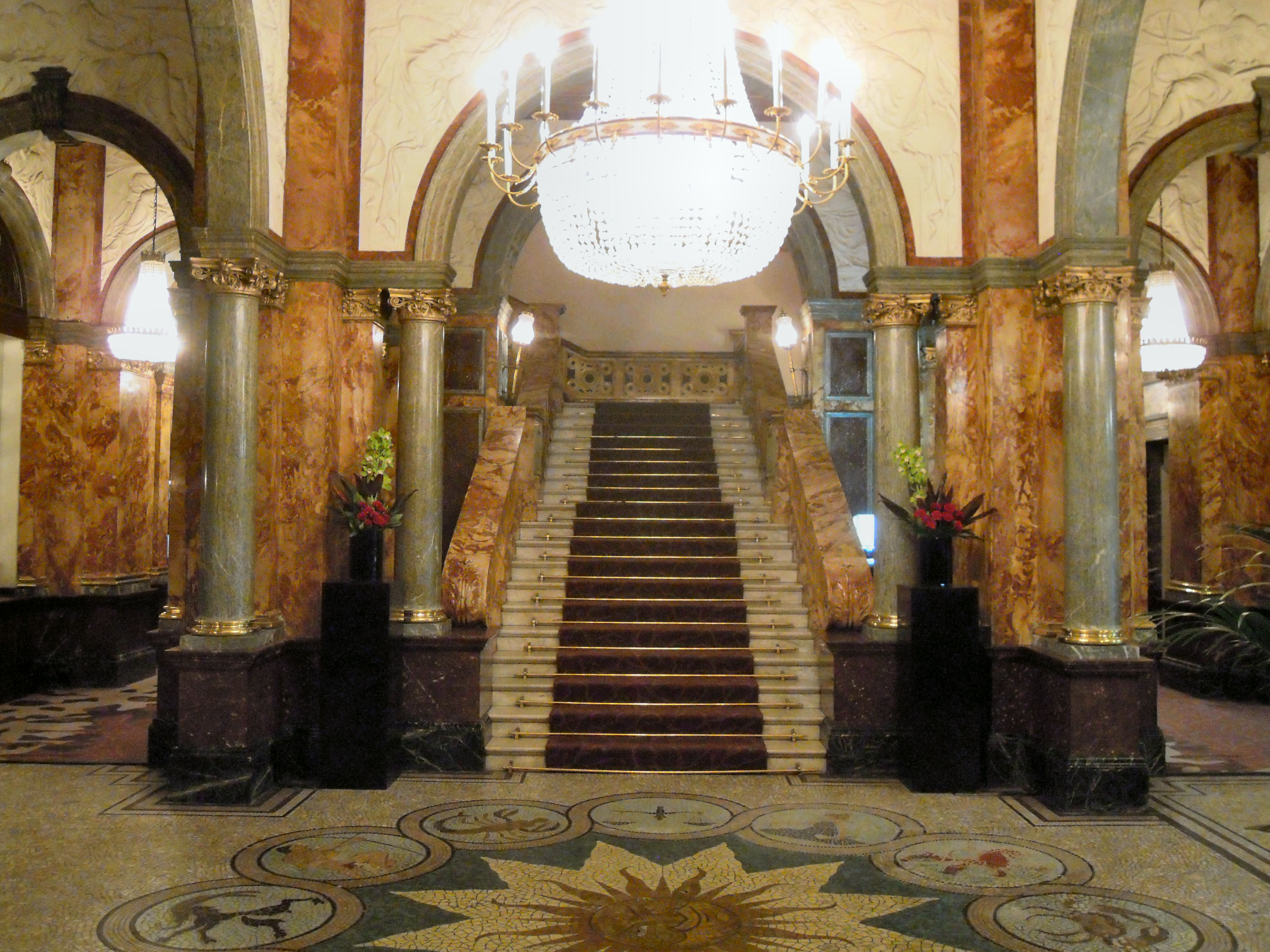
The Pyrenean Marble Staircase

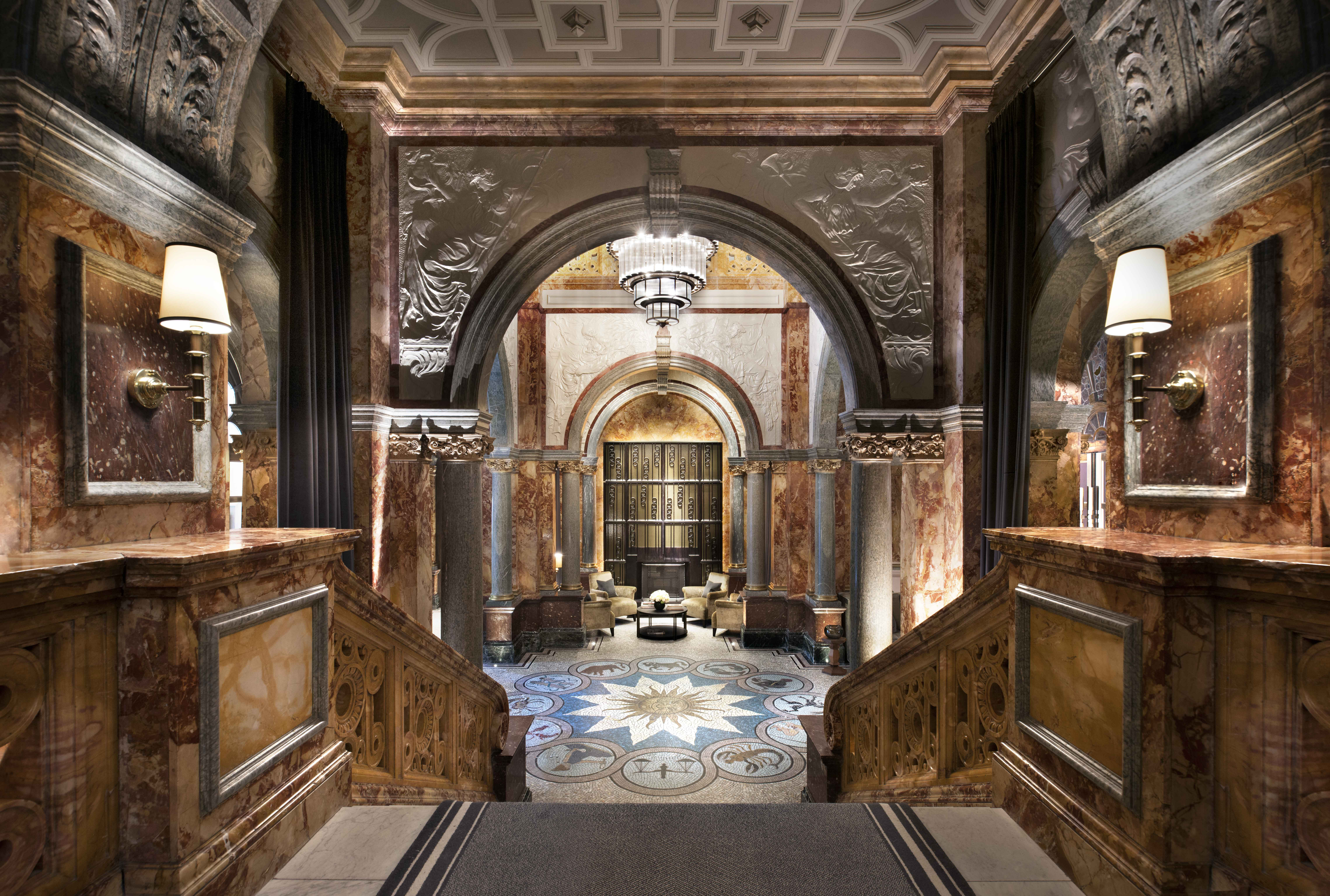
Kimpton Fitzroy London Entryway

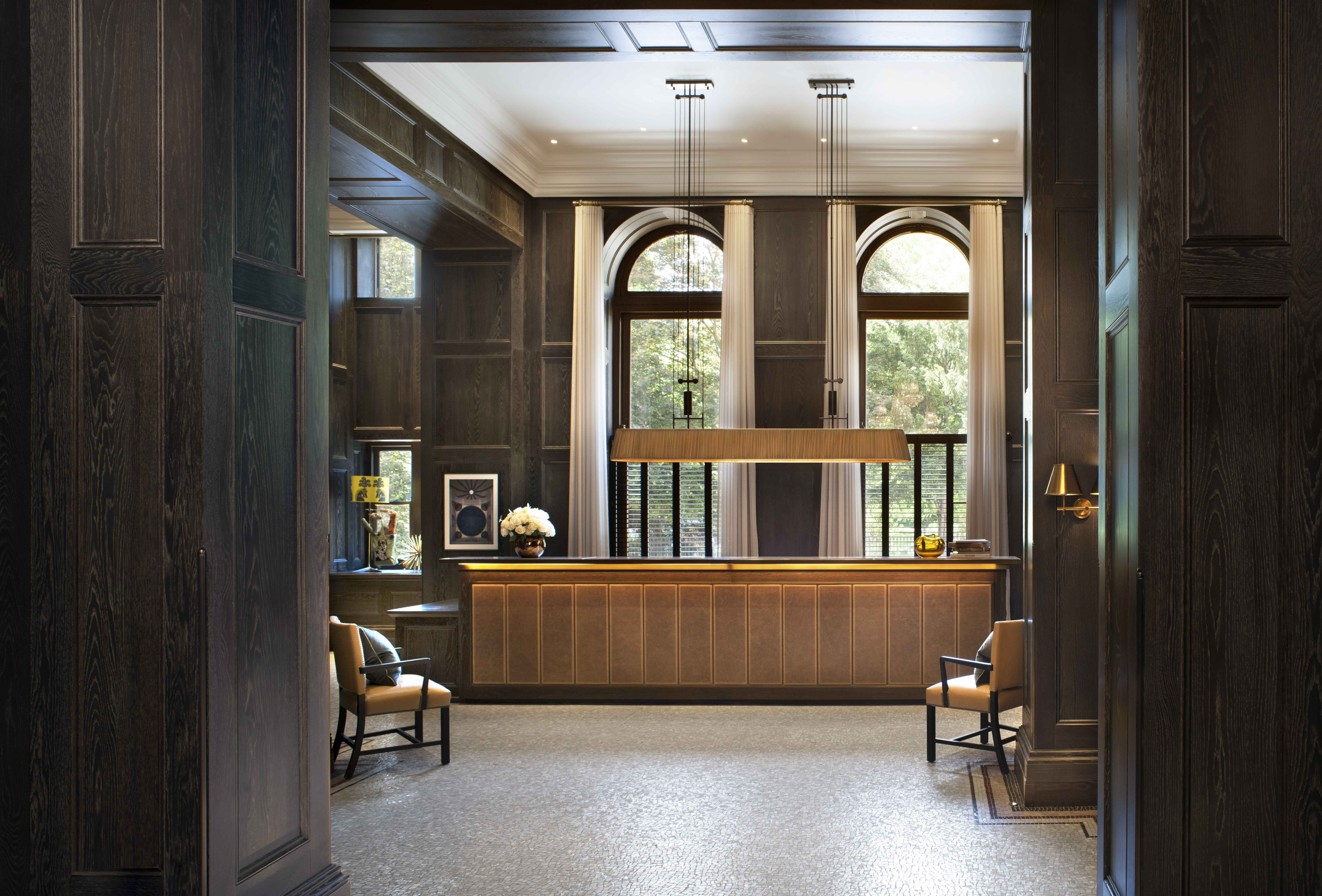
Kimpton Fitzroy London Front Desk

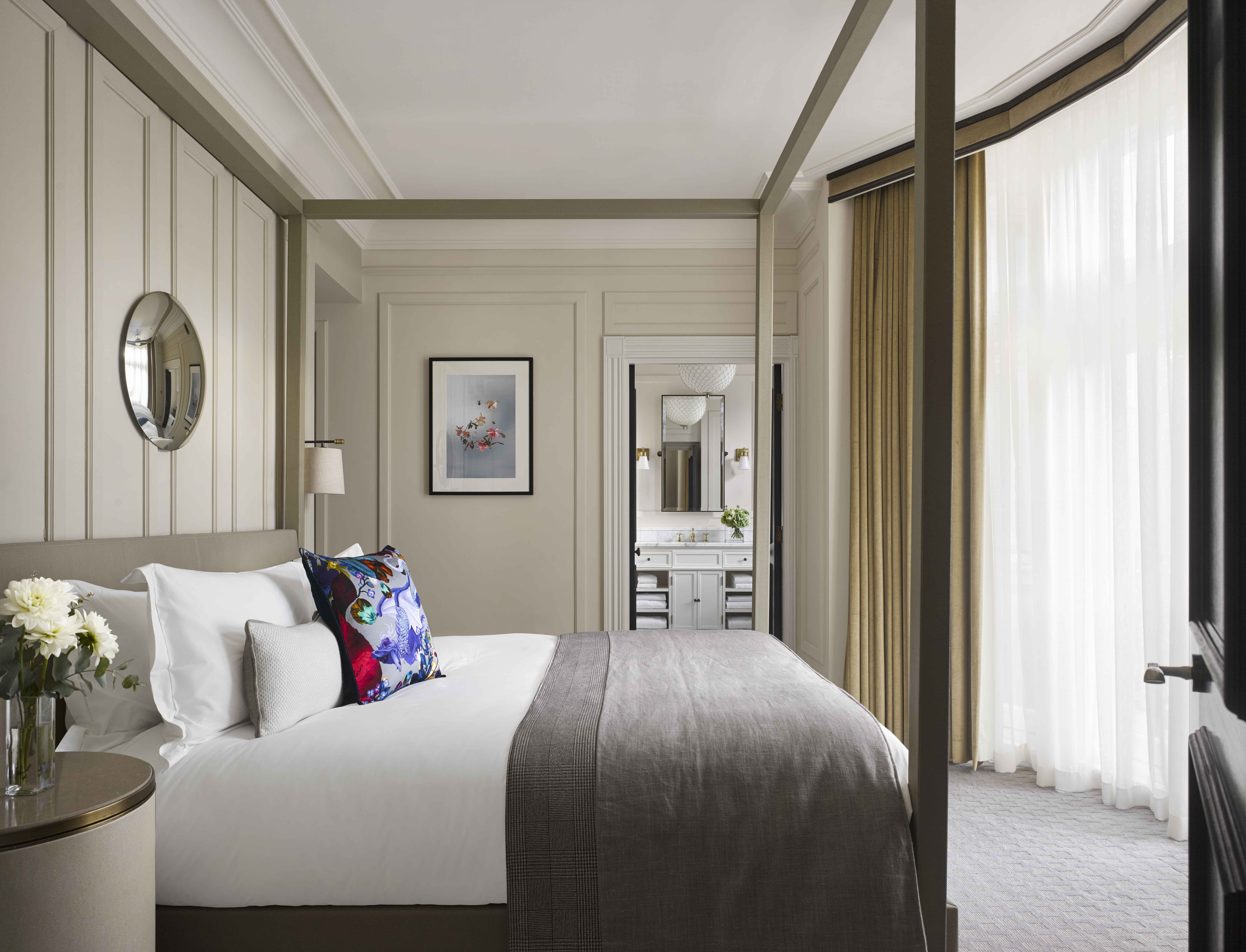
Kimpton Fitzroy London Guest Room

== See also ==
- Hotels in London
