= Imperial Hotel, London =

Hotel on Russell Square, London

Imperial Hotel
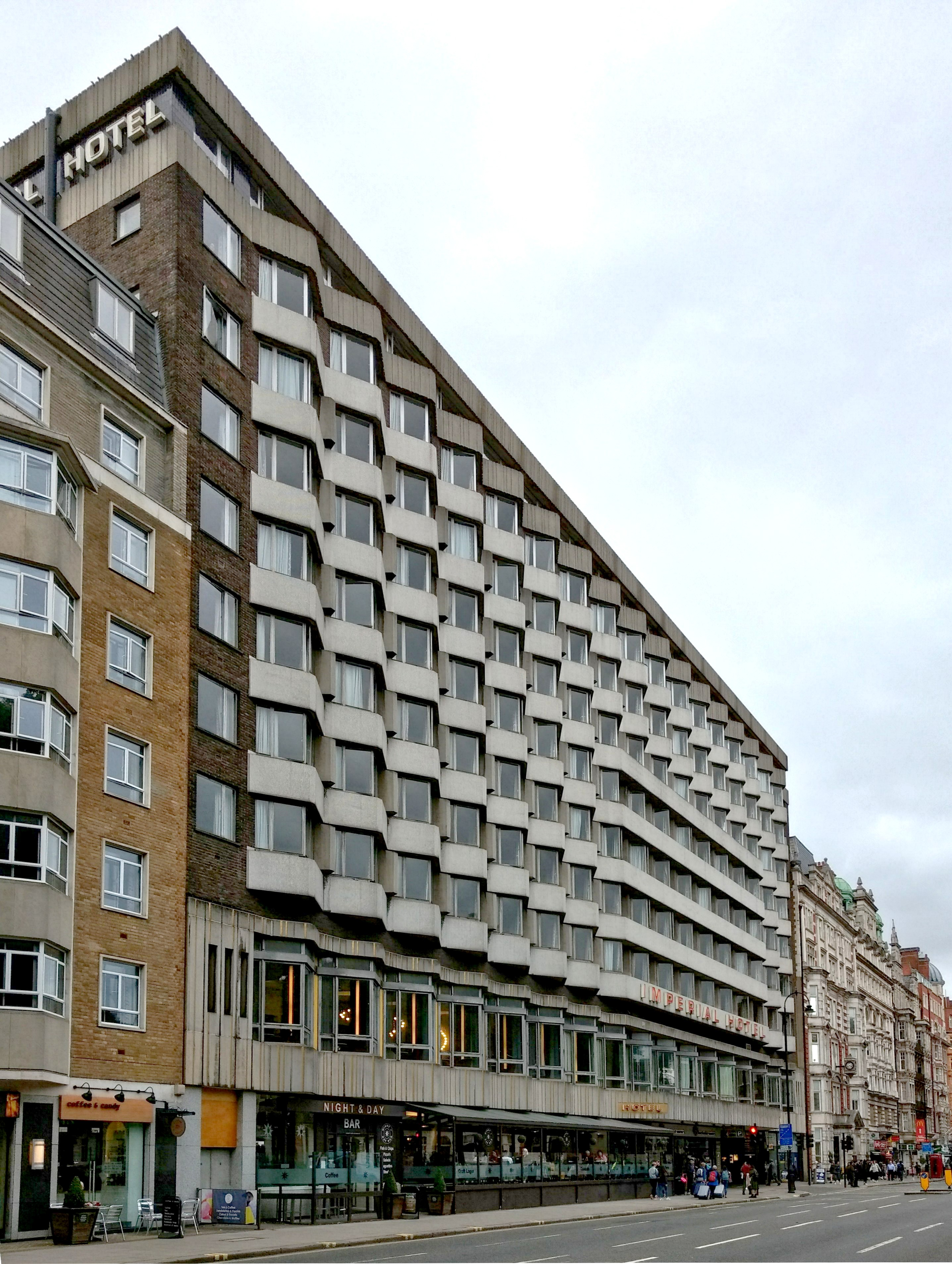
- Imperial Hotel, Russell Square, 2017

- Location within Central London
- Hotel chain: Imperial London Hotels

General information
- Location: 61-66 Russell Square, London, WC1B 5BB, United Kingdom
- Coordinates: 51°31′18″N 0°07′27″W
- Renovated: 2024-2026

Technical details
- Floor count: 10

Other information
- Number of rooms: 357

Website
- www.imperialhotels.co.uk/hotels/IMPERIAL

The Imperial Hotel is a four-star hotel on the east side of Russell Square, London. It is a branch of Imperial London Hotels.

== Former building (1907–1967) ==
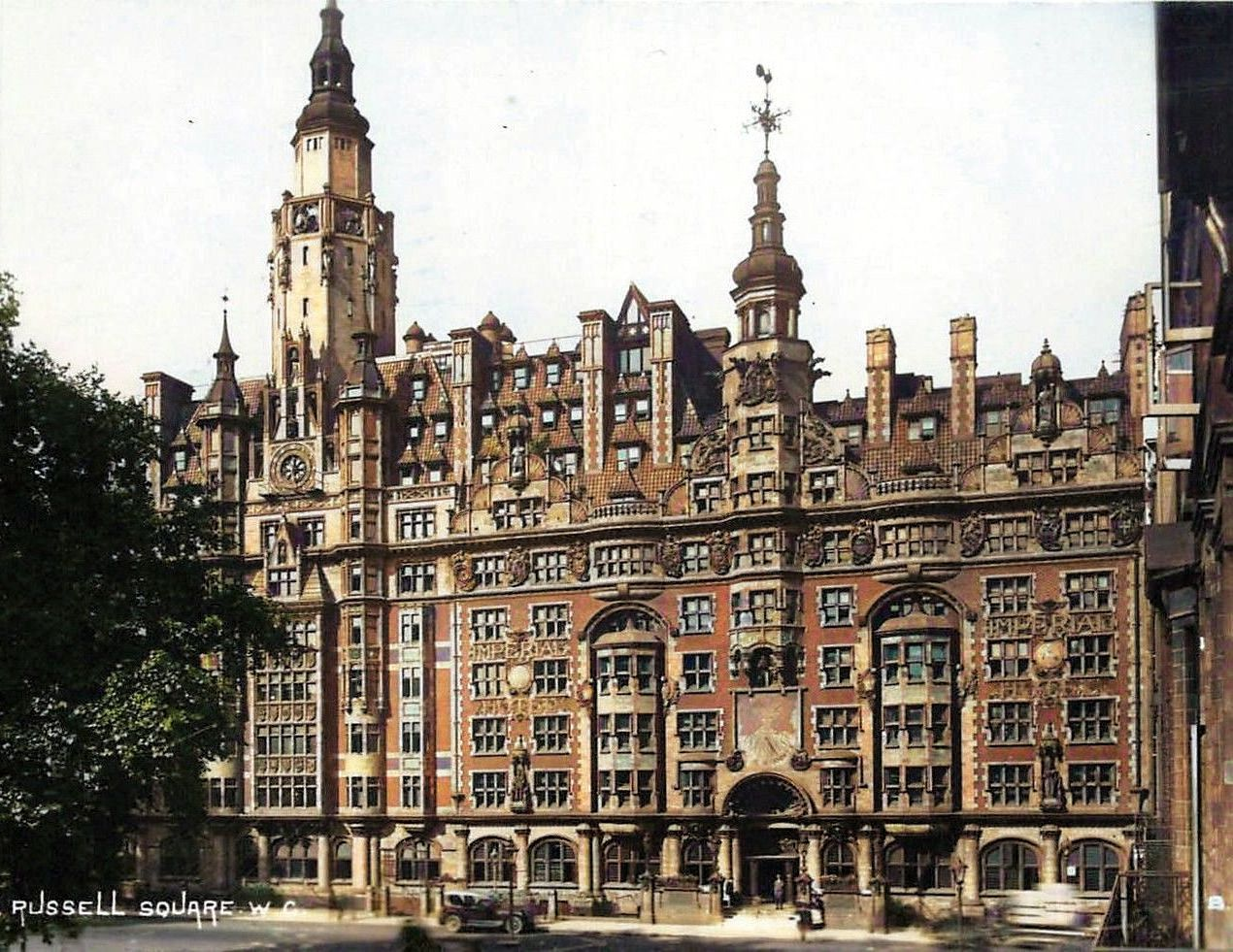
Imperial Hotel, the original building, about 1915

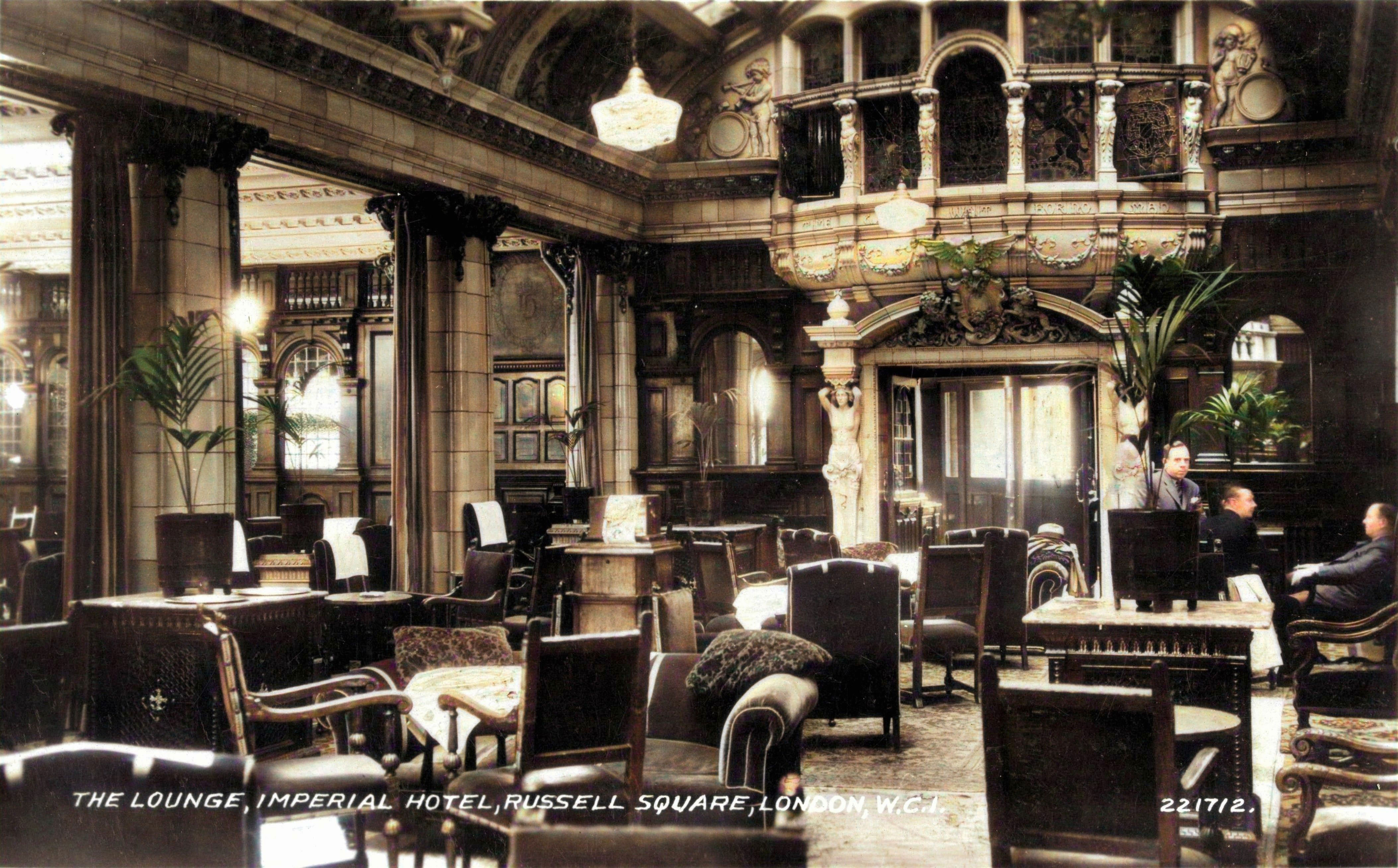
The Lounge, about 1920

The original building was designed by Charles Fitzroy Doll and built between 1905 and 1907. The height of the building was 61 meters and there were 15 floors. In 1911, it was used by the first all-Indian cricket team to tour England.

Physicist Leo Szilard was staying at the Imperial Hotel when he conceived of the atomic bomb.

Round about 1910 an extension to the hotel took place and construction was completed in 1913. As part of the extension, Victorian-style Turkish baths were constructed. The hotel had about 640 bedrooms. The building was as colossal as its neighbour, Doll's Hotel Russell, now the Kimpton Fitzroy London Hotel. The architectural style was a mixture of Art Nouveau Tudor and Art Nouveau Gothic, combining terra-cotta ornaments in which the corbels, gargoyles and statues were modelled with red brick. Towers rose above a high mansard roof of green copper. A Winter Garden occupied the ground floor between the two bedroom wings. Both Winter garden and Turkish baths were decorated in glazed Doulton ware.

The building was demolished at the beginning of 1967. It was demolished because of its lack of bathrooms and because, according to the Greater London Council, the whole frame of the building was structurally unsound. There was no possibility of saving it if a preservation order had been placed on the building. In truth, however, the building was probably a victim of fashion and the prevailing taste in the 1960s. All that remains of the building are 21 statues from the Turkish baths, bells and a galleon, now placed in the courtyard of the current hotel.

== Current building ==
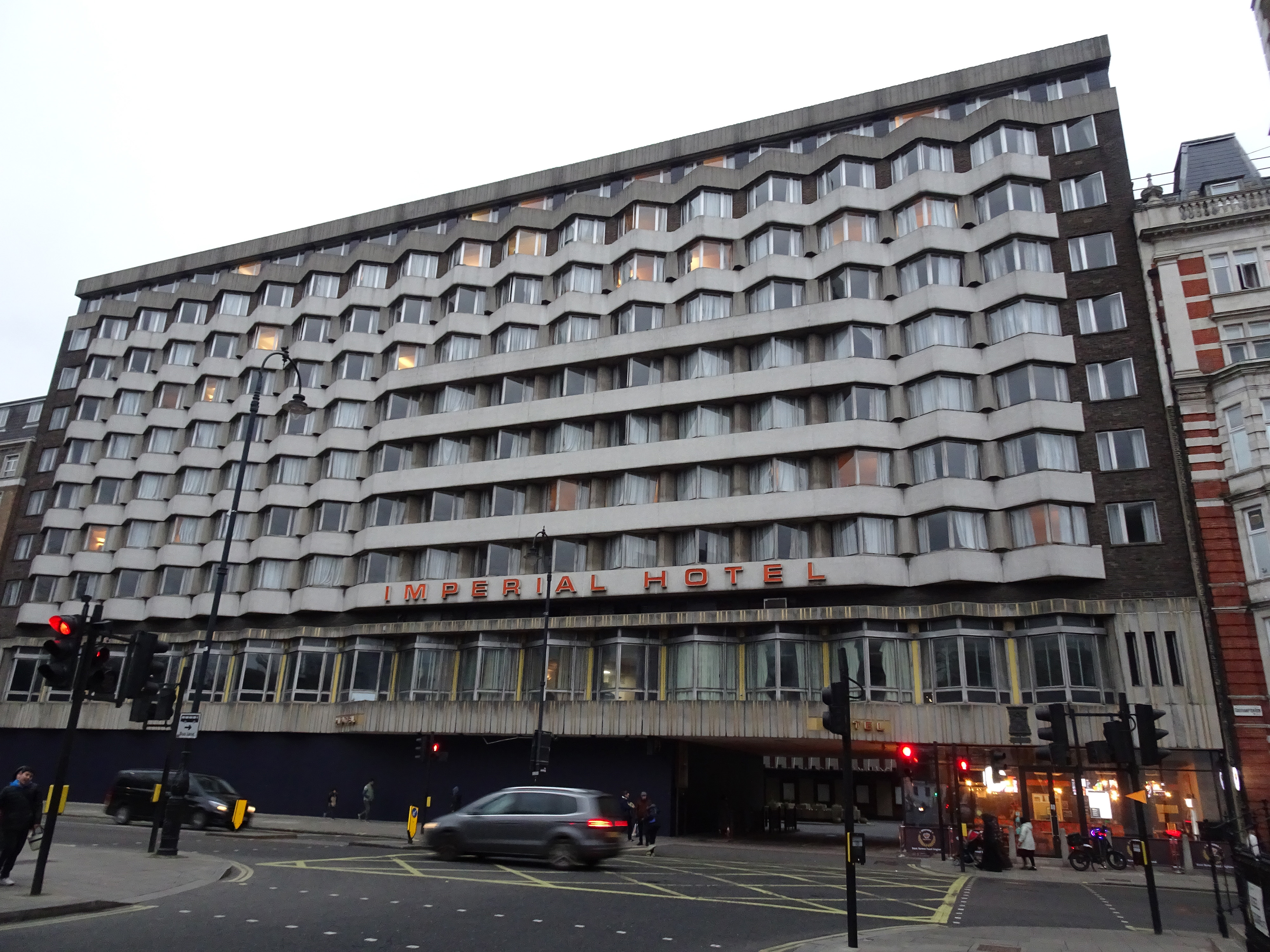
The current hotel seen in 2023 prior to its renovation.

The hotel was replaced by a new building of the same name but in a Modernist-Brutalist style, which opened in 1970. The architects were Charles Lovett Gill & Partners. The Imperial Hotel and its pair the President Hotel contiguous to the north are described in Pevsner's London as "two tawdry affairs with sawtooth fronts, entirely unworthy of their position". The change of style followed the arrival of a new generation of the owning Walduck family (Richard, Thomas and Stephen Walduck) in the mid 1960s, succeeding their fathers Harold, Norman and Stanley Walduck. The Brutalist zig-zag patterns had already been used on their Bedford Hotel, on the west side of Southampton Row.

The Imperial Hotel closed for renovation in June 2024 and reopened in August 2026. It has 357 rooms and a rooftop terrace on the 10th floor with a bar, a restaurant, and a free viewing area open to the public.

== See also ==
- Constantine v Imperial Hotels Ltd
