= Robert Rowand Anderson =

Scottish architect (1834–1921)

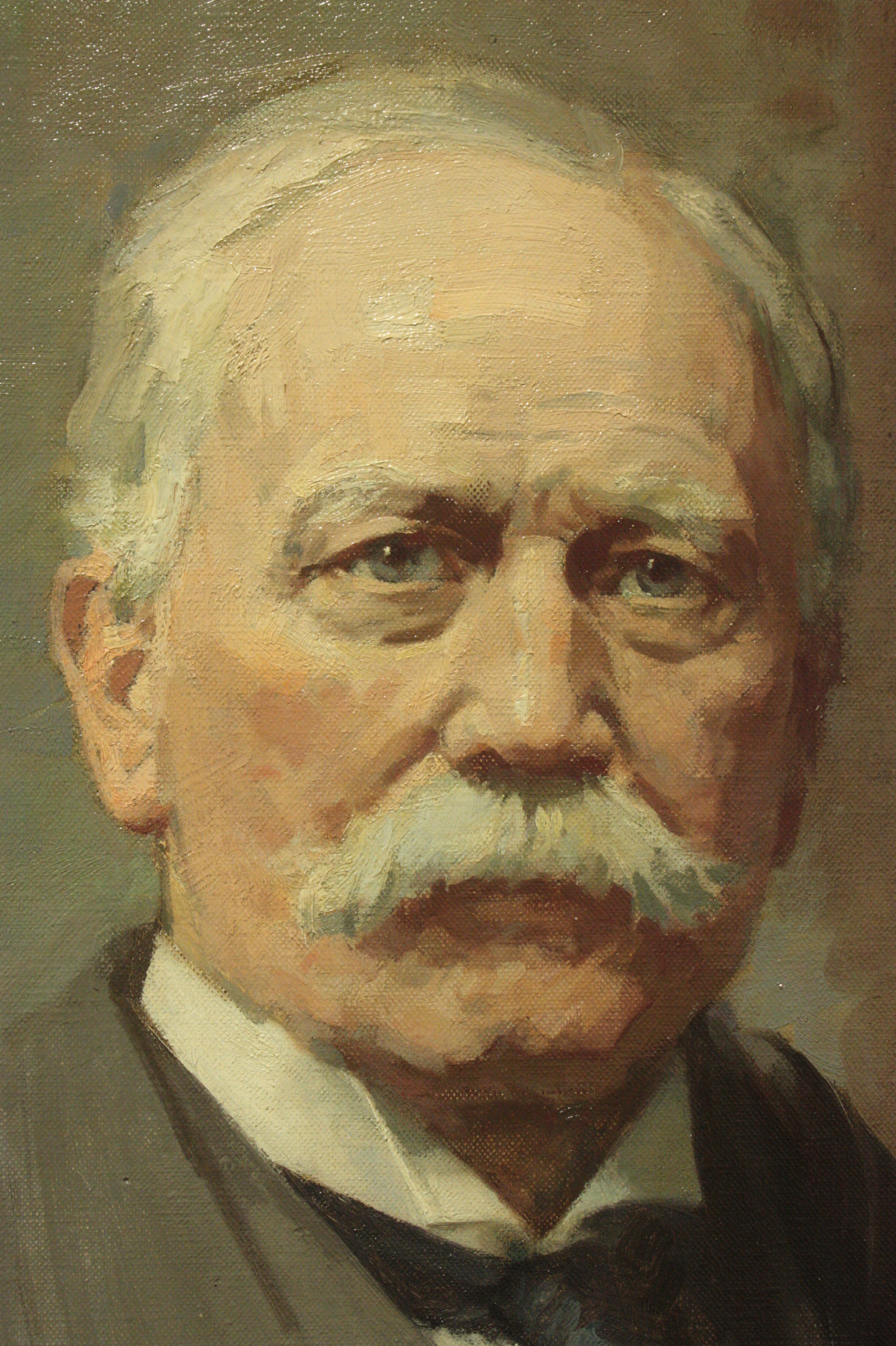
- Anderson by John M. Aiken
- Born: 5 April 1834; Liberton, Scotland
- Died: 1 June 1921 (aged 87); Colinton, Scotland
- Occupation: Architect
- Buildings: Grand Central Hotel, Glasgow; McEwen Hall, Edinburgh

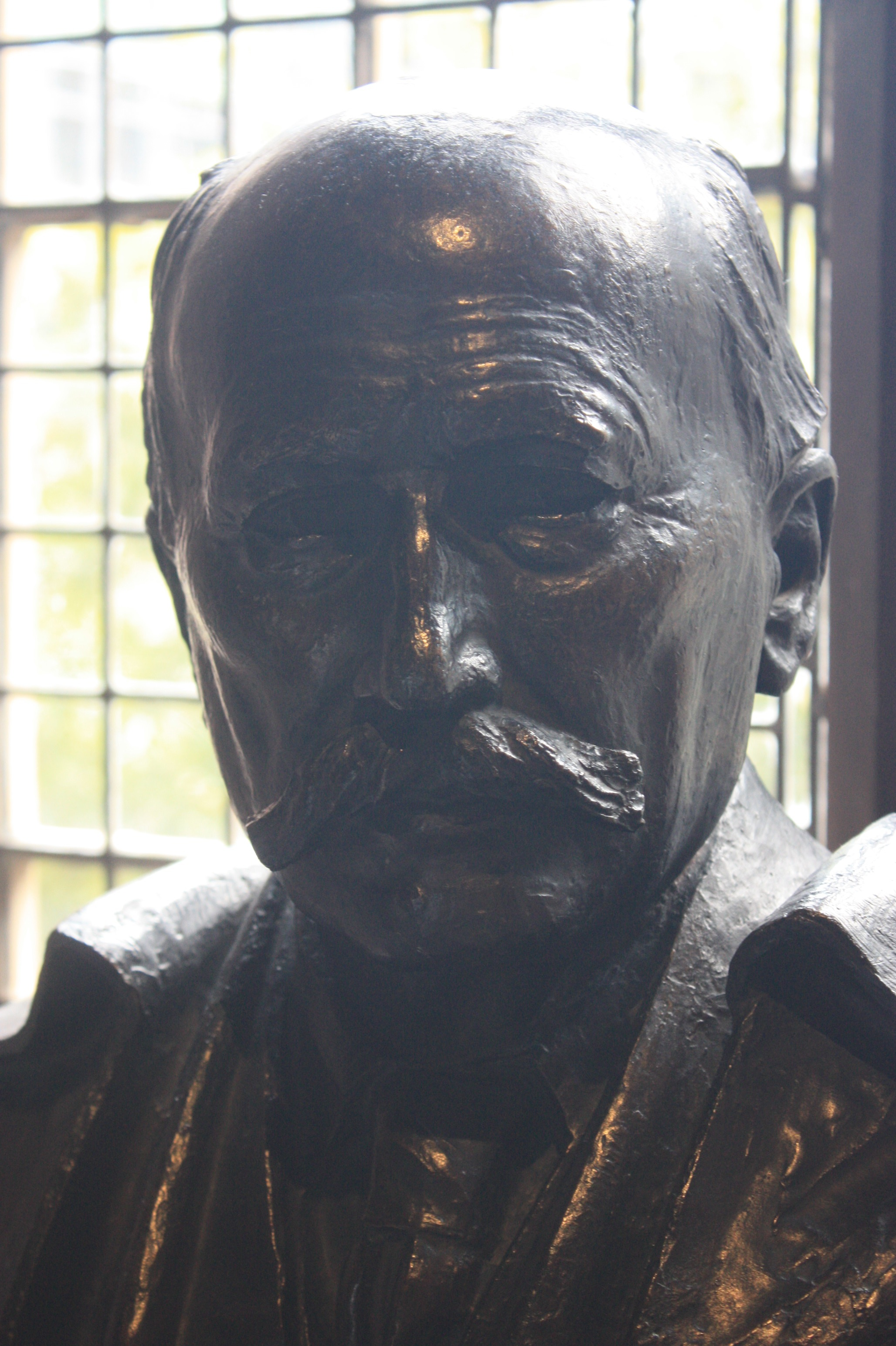
Robert Rowand Anderson by James Pittendrigh Macgillivray 1921

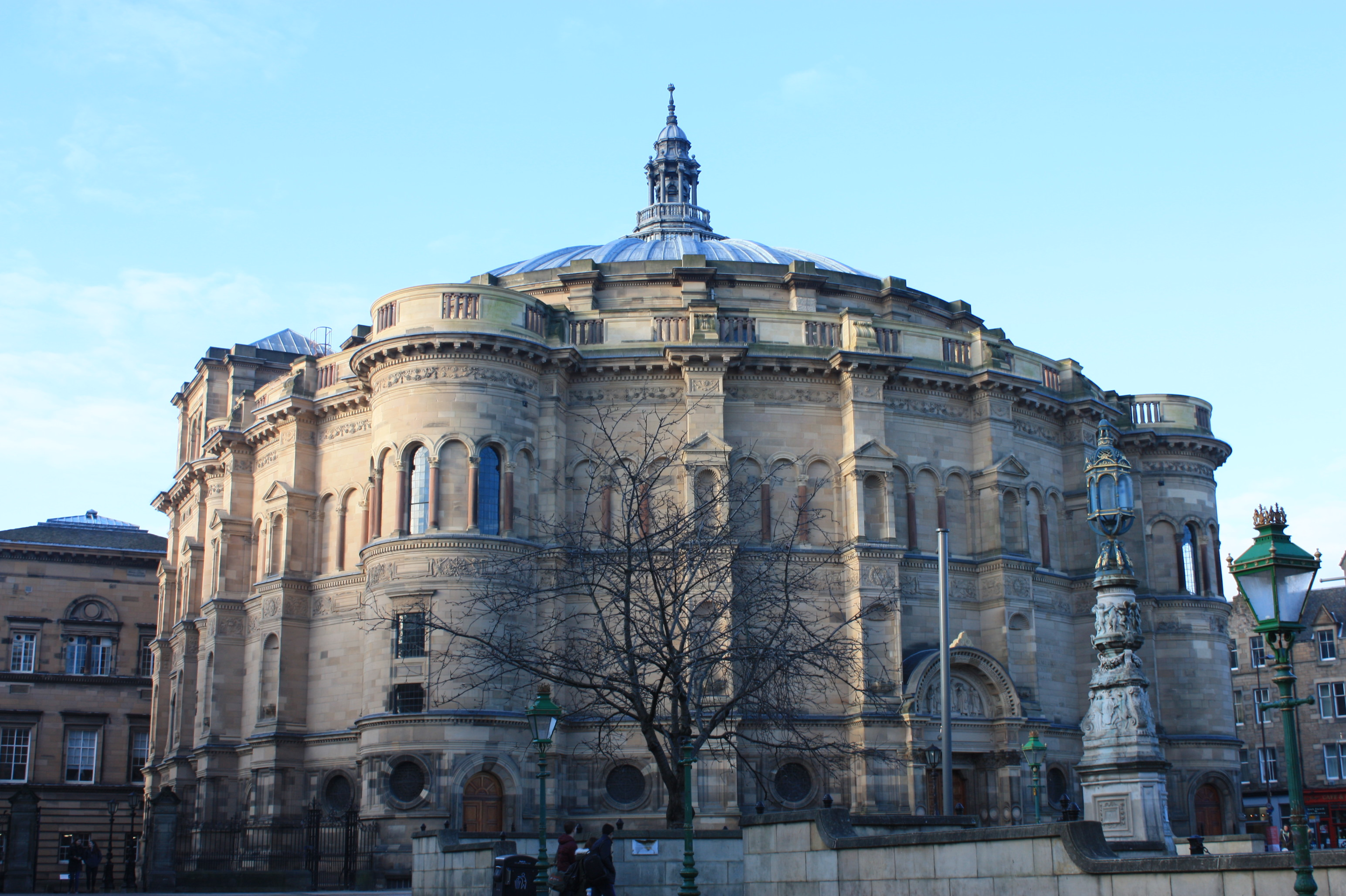
McEwan Hall, Edinburgh, by Rowand Anderson

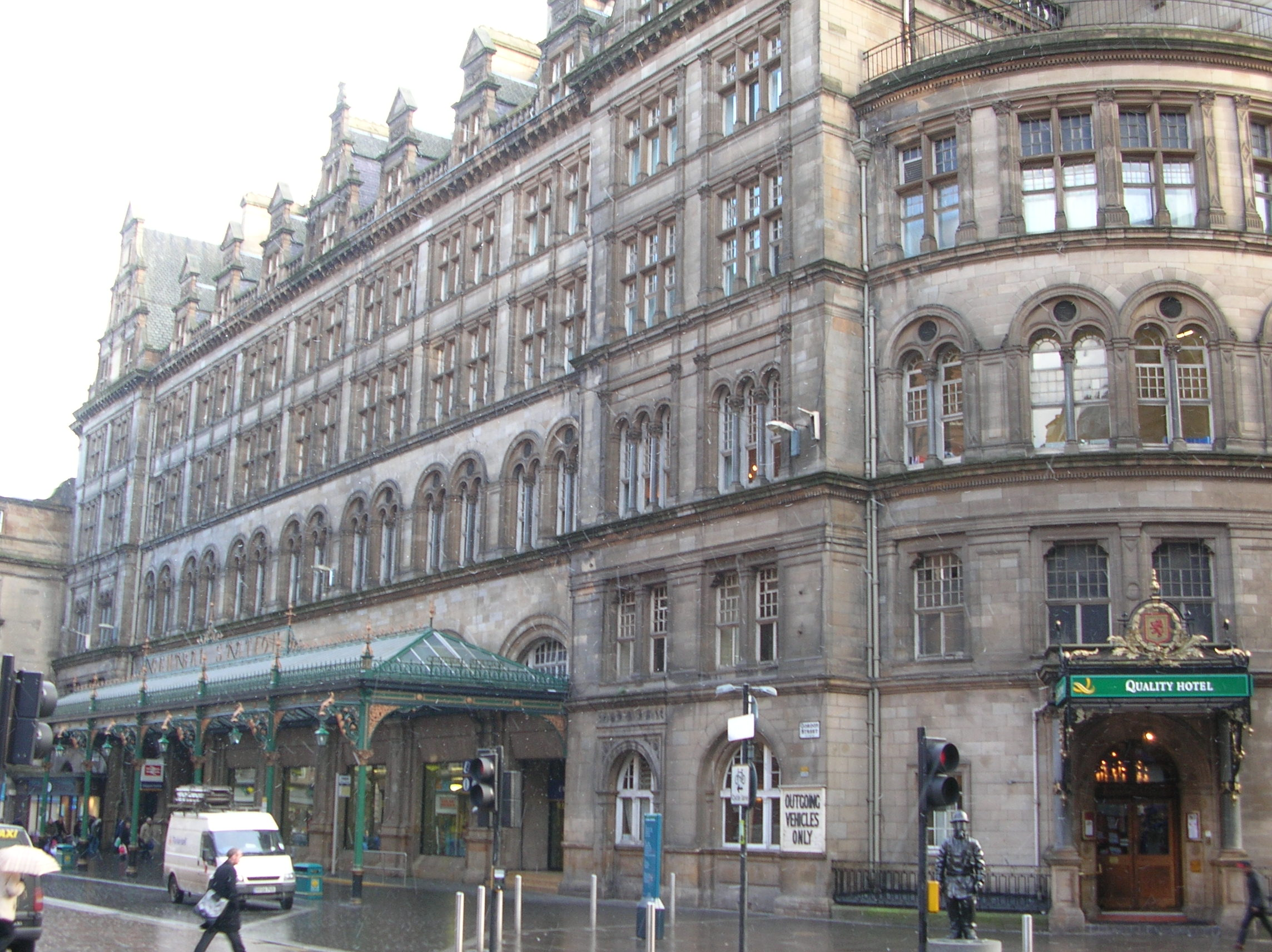
The Central Hotel at Glasgow Central station

Sir Robert Rowand Anderson, FRSE RSA (5 April 1834 – 1 June 1921) was a Scottish Victorian architect. Anderson trained in the office of George Gilbert Scott in London before setting up his own practice in Edinburgh in 1860. During the 1860s his main work was small churches in the 'First Pointed' (or Early English) style that is characteristic of Scott's former assistants. By 1880 his practice was designing some of the most prestigious public and private buildings in Scotland.

His works include the Scottish National Portrait Gallery; the Dome of Old College, Medical Faculty and McEwan Hall, the University of Edinburgh; Govan Old Parish Church and the Pearce Institute; the Central Hotel at Glasgow Central Station, the Catholic Apostolic Church in Edinburgh and Mount Stuart House on the Isle of Bute for the 3rd Marquess of Bute.

== Early life ==
Anderson was born at Liberton, outside Edinburgh, the third child of James Anderson (1797-1869), a solicitor, and Margaret Rowand (1797-1868). Educated at George Watson's College, he began a legal apprenticeship in 1845, and briefly worked for his father's firm. He began to study architecture in 1849, attending classes at the Trustees' Drawing Academy (which later became Edinburgh College of Art), and was articled to architect John Lessels (1809–1883).

In 1857 he took a two-year post as an assistant to George Gilbert Scott, in his office at Trafalgar Square, London. Here he worked alongside many influential architects. He then spent time travelling and studying in France and Italy, also working briefly for Pierre Cuypers in Roermond, Netherlands.

== Architectural career ==
In 1860, Anderson returned to Edinburgh, and began working as an architect with the Royal Engineers, undertaking works on coastal defences, and the 78th Highlanders memorial outside Edinburgh Castle. For Giles Gilbert Scott, he supervised the construction of St James's Church in Leith, which led to further commissions from the Scottish Episcopal Church, including Christ Church, Falkirk (1862), All Saints, Brougham Place, Edinburgh (1864), St Andrew's Church in St Andrews (1866), St John's, Alloa (1866), and St James, Cupar (1866). All of these were carried out alongside his work for the Royal Engineers, and show the influence of Scott's church designs.

Anderson set up his own independent practice in 1868. In 1869, St Mungo's Church in Balerno was completed to his design.

His first significant commission came in 1871, for the restoration of St Vigeans Parish Church, Angus. He went on to win the competition to design the Catholic Apostolic Church in Edinburgh, now the Mansfield Traquair Centre on Mansfield Place in Broughton. Anderson joined the Society of Antiquaries of Scotland, where he met future clients including the Marquis of Bute. In 1873 a short-lived partnership with David Bryce began, but was dissolved only a few months later.

In 1874, he was invited to submit designs for a competition for the University of Edinburgh Medical Faculty and graduation hall. He undertook further study tours to Europe, resulting in the winning Italian Renaissance style design which was finalised in 1877. The design secured Anderson's election to the Royal Scottish Academy, although the Medical School was not completed until 1886, and the McEwan Hall not until 1897. His next major commission came soon after, in 1876, when he was appointed as architect for Glasgow Central Station. In 1878 Anderson designed a new Mount Stuart House (1878–1896) in an Italian Gothic style for the 3rd Marquess of Bute, following the destruction by fire of the previous house. The Scottish National Portrait Gallery (1884–1889) was designed in a similar style, and also executed in red sandstone.

In 1881, Anderson made his employee George Washington Browne a partner, and two years later the firm became Wardrop, Anderson and Browne, following the death of Maitland Wardrop and the merger of his practice with Anderson's. However, Browne left in 1885, and Hew Wardrop died in 1887 at Udny Castle, leaving Anderson as sole partner again. Notable architects employed within the Anderson practice included Robert Weir Schultz, Robert Lorimer, and Sydney Mitchell.

During the 1880s, Anderson's style became increasingly influenced by Scottish historical architecture, possibly as a result of his friendship with architectural historians MacGibbon and Ross. The Scottish influence is evident in the Normand Memorial Hall, Dysart (1882), Ardgowan Estate Office, Greenock (1886), and the Pearce Institute, Govan (1892).

From the 1890s, restoration became the focus of Anderson's architecture, as major commissions declined. He had already undertaken work at Iona Abbey and Jedburgh Abbey in the 1870s, and now restored Dunblane Cathedral and Paisley Abbey. He became more involved in teaching, helping to set up a School of Applied Art in 1892. In 1903 this merged into the new Edinburgh College of Art, with Anderson as a trustee.

In his later years Anderson became difficult to work with, and was perceived as arrogant. Another partnership, formed in 1899, was dissolved following lawsuits in 1902. Rowand Anderson and Paul was formed in 1904, with Arthur Forman Balfour Paul (who had trained under him from 1892 to 1896), son of Sir James Balfour Paul, the Lord Lyon.

Anderson was knighted in the 1902 Birthday Honours for his work at the Scottish royal residence, Balmoral Castle. In 1916 he was awarded the Royal Gold Medal for architecture.

By 1916, he was ill, but was able to found the Incorporation of Architects in Scotland (later the Royal Incorporation of Architects in Scotland) in that year, with fellow architect Alexander Lorne Campbell speaking and acting on his behalf. Anderson donated his own Rutland Square townhouse to be used as its headquarters.

He retired to Allermuir House on Woodhall Road in Colinton and died there in 1921. He is buried in Warriston Cemetery. The grave is in a hard to find location on a lower level to the south-west, backing onto the western path.

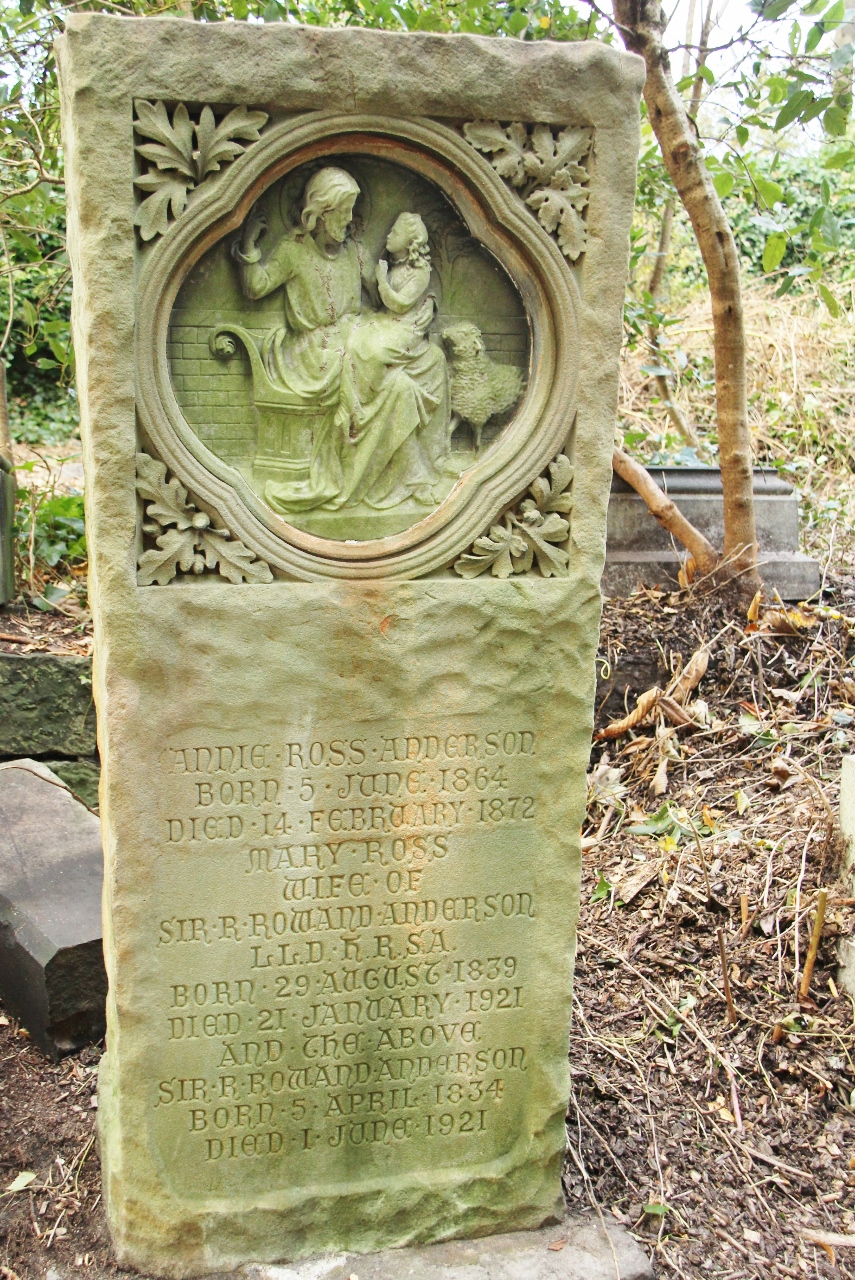
Gravestone of Sir Robert Rowand Anderson at Warriston Cemetery, Edinburgh

== The Rowand Anderson practice ==
Anderson's architectural practice was carried on as Rowand Anderson and Paul (with Paul as sole partner), until Basil Spence and William Kininmonth joined in 1934, forming Rowand Anderson and Paul and Partners. Paul died in 1938, and Spence left in 1945, leaving Kininmonth to carry on as Rowand Anderson, Kininmonth and Paul. When Kininmonth retired in 1976, the firm split, with the Rowand Anderson name taken by Richard Ewing, who had been made a partner around 1971. The Rowand Anderson Partnership is still based in Rutland Square.
