= The George Hotel (Edinburgh) =

Hotel in Edinburgh, Scotland

InterContinental Edinburgh The George
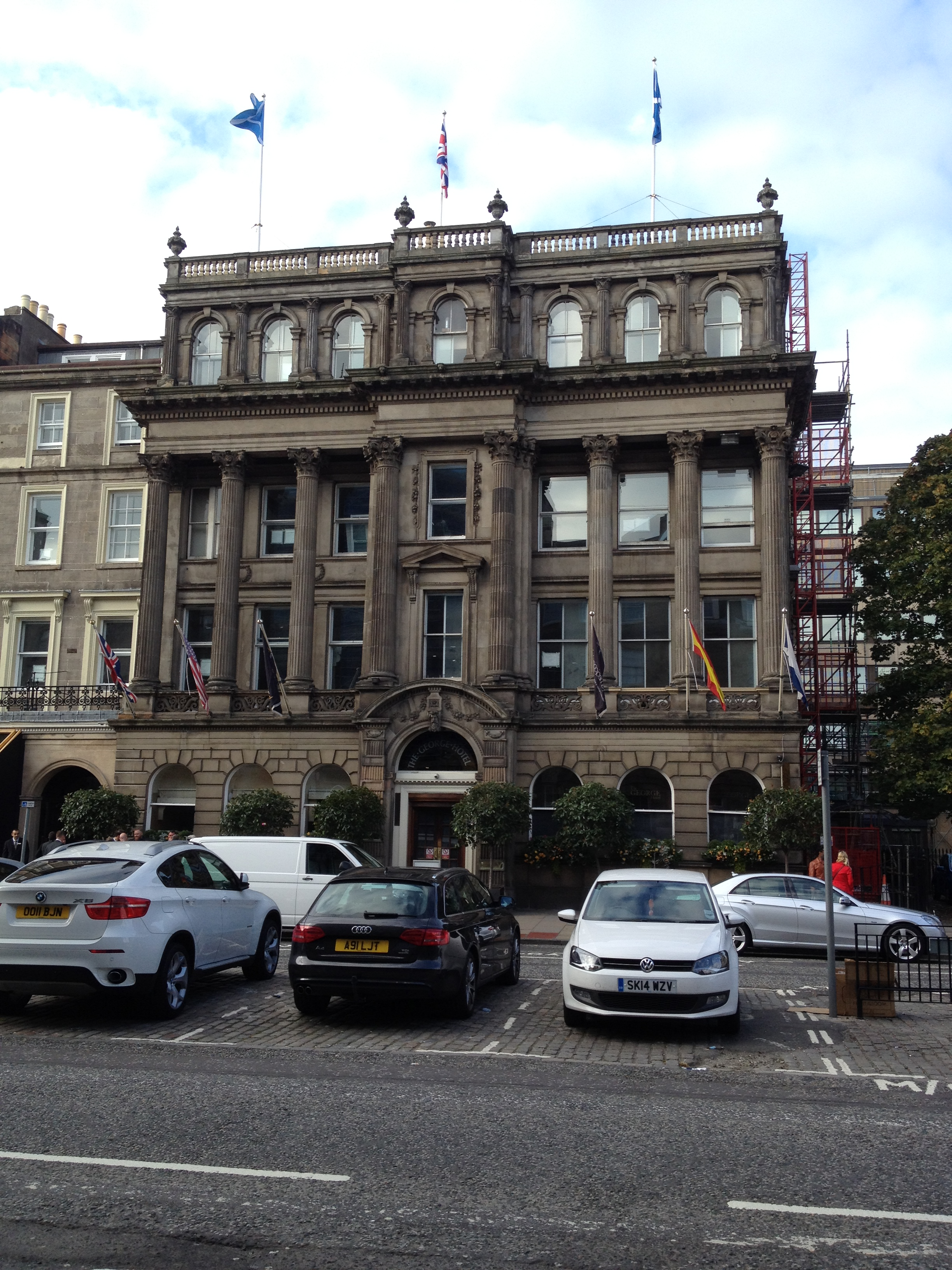
- No. 19 George St, the hotel's main entrance
- Interactive map of the InterContinental Edinburgh The George area

General information
- Location: 19-21 George Street, Edinburgh, Scotland
- Coordinates: 55.953810°N 3.196346°W
- Opening: 1881

Technical details
- Floor count: Townhouse (Old Wing) 4 Forth (New Wing) 7

Other information
- Number of rooms: 240
- Number of restaurants: 1
- Parking: On Street (Limited, Chargeable, Maximum 3 Hours) Hotel provides discounts to residents when parking at the St James Quarter car park.

Website
- InterContinental Edinburgh The George

InterContinental Edinburgh The George is a historic hotel located at 19–21 George Street in Edinburgh, the capital of Scotland.

== History ==
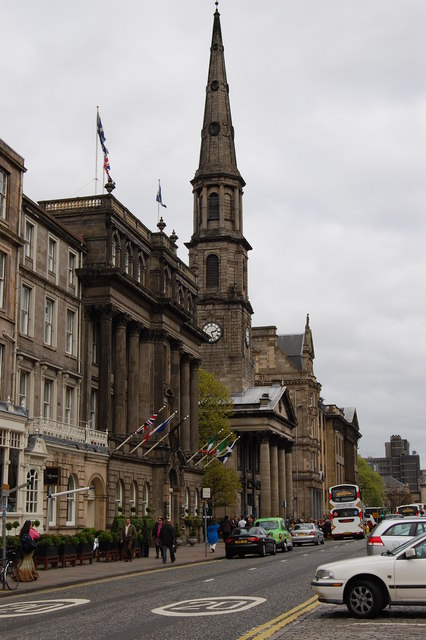
The hotel, next to Edinburgh: New Town Church (formerly St Andrew's and St George's West Church)

The five townhouses on George Street that make up the hotel's historic core, Nos. 15–25, were constructed around 1780 as part of Edinburgh's New Town, to designs by John Young. They are now a category A listed building. In 1840, No. 19 George Street was remodeled by architect David Bryce, as the headquarters of the Caledonian Insurance Company. It is today the hotel's main entrance.

In 1860, a hotel opened in Nos. 21 & 23, gradually expanding to cover the upper levels of the other buildings as well. In 1879, the Caledonian Insurance Company expanded to Nos. 15 & 17, with remodeling carried out by MacGibbon and Ross. In 1881, the hotel portion became The George Hotel. In 1905, the hotel was completely remodeled, with the addition of luxurious public rooms on the ground floor.

In 1939, the Caledonian Insurance Company moved out, selling their premises to The George Hotel. The outbreak of World War II prevented a planned expansion, and the offices were requisitioned by the Navy, Army and Air Force Institutes until 1946. The old insurance offices finally opened as the expanded George Hotel in 1950. In 1958, the hotel proposed a 17-story tower wing in the rear, but a public inquiry prevented its construction. The George Hotel's owners, Grand Metropolitan, eventually built a smaller 7-storey rear wing, designed by Henry Wylie, in 1967.

When Grand Metropolitan bought Inter-Continental Hotels in 1981, they placed the George in that company's Forum Hotels division. In the early 1990s, the George was remodeled and transferred to the upscale Inter-Continental Hotels division as the George Inter-Continental Edinburgh. InterContinental Hotels sold the George to the Principal Hotel Company for £20 million in June 2005, and the hotel returned to its original name, before being completely renovated in 2006. It was voted Best Hotel in Edinburgh at the Scottish Hotel Awards 2009.

In 2015–16, London-based interior design studio Goddard Littlefair redesigned the hotel's interiors. The former Tempus Bar & Restaurant reopened in 2015 as The Printing Press Bar & Kitchen, under the direction of chef-restaurateur Des McDonald, previously of The Ritz and The Ivy in London. On 1 November 2016, at the conclusion of the renovations, Principal Hotels renamed the hotel The Principal Edinburgh George Street. In May 2018, InterContinental Hotels bought Principal Hotels, and the hotel was renamed InterContinental Edinburgh The George on 31 July 2019.

== Noted guests ==
For the past 200 years the property has been a prestigious address. In Georgian times the poet Robert Burns paid many visits to No. 25, as did the author Sir Walter Scott. In more modern times celebrities such as Elizabeth Taylor, Omar Sharif, Jack Lemmon and Kylie Minogue have visited.
