= Christian Doll =

English cricketer and architect

Personal information
- Full name: Christian Charles Tyler Doll
- Born: 22 March 1880; Kensington, London, England
- Died: 5 April 1955 (aged 75); Meldreth, Cambridgeshire, England
- Batting: Right-handed
- Bowling: Unknown
- Relatives: Mordaunt Doll (brother)

Domestic team information
- Years: Team
- 1900–1904: Marylebone Cricket Club
- 1901: Cambridge University
- 1901–1909: Hertfordshire

Career statistics
Competition	First-class
Matches	27
Runs scored	774
Batting average	21.50
100s/50s	2/1
Top score	224*
Balls bowled	12
Wickets	0
Bowling average	–
5 wickets in innings	–
10 wickets in match	–
Best bowling	–
Catches/stumpings	17/–
- Source: Cricinfo, 9 July 2019

Christian Charles Tyler Doll (22 March 1880 – 5 April 1955) was an English first-class cricketer and a prominent architect at the ancient site of Knossos in Crete.

== Early life and cricket ==
The son of the architect Charles Fitzroy Doll and his wife, Emily Francis Tyler, he was born at Kensington in March 1880. He was educated at Charterhouse School, before going up to Trinity College, Cambridge in 1898. He made his debut in first-class cricket for the Marylebone Cricket Club (MCC) against Cambridge University in 1900, with Doll making five appearances for the MCC in that season. The following season he made a single appearance in first-class cricket for Cambridge University against London County at Crystal Palace. He continued to play first-class cricket for the MCC until 1904, making a total of 28 appearances. He scored 747 runs for the MCC, at an average of 21.97, with a high score of 224 not out. This score, which was one of two centuries he made, came against London County in 1901. In addition to playing first-class cricket, he also played minor counties cricket for Hertfordshire from 1901–09, making nineteen appearances in the Minor Counties Championship.

== Architectural career ==
After graduating from Cambridge in 1901, Doll attended University College London where he studied for architectural diploma. He was present at the British School of Archaeology at Athens in 1904. He was the architect to British excavations at Knossos in Crete, replacing Theodore Fyfe, and was partly responsible for the reconstruction of the grand staircase at the Palace of King Minos, working alongside Arthur Evans. In addition, he designed the Villa Ariadne, a residence for Evans at Knossos, which now houses the Knossos Research Centre. He was succeeded in the role as Knossos architect, by Piet de Jong, who expanded on many of his reconstruction interventions. He served as the mayor of Holborn in 1951. Doll died in April 1955 at Meldreth, Cambridgeshire. His brother, Mordaunt, also played first-class cricket.
