= Russell Square =

Large garden square in London, United Kingdom

Coordinates: 51°31′18″N 0°7′34″W

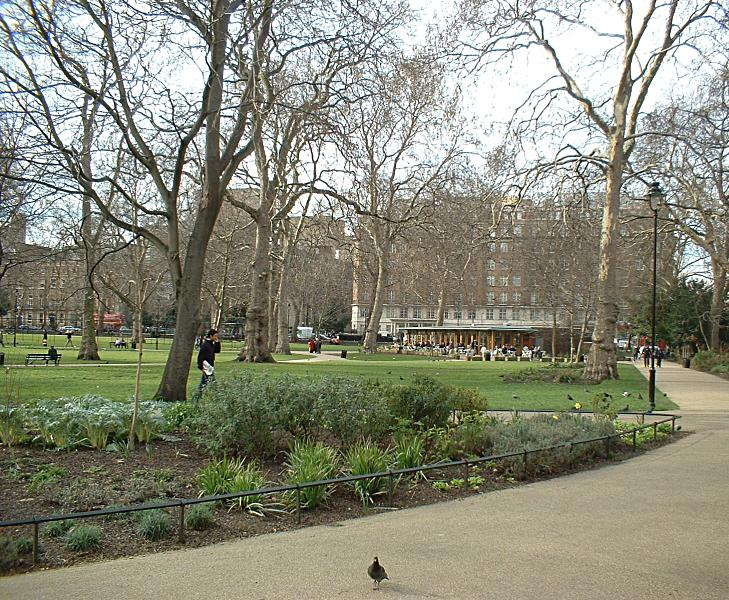
Russell Square

Russell Square is a large garden square in Bloomsbury, in the London Borough of Camden, built predominantly by the firm of James Burton. It is near the University of London's main buildings and the British Museum. Almost exactly square, to the north is Woburn Place and to the south-east is Southampton Row. Russell Square tube station sits to the north-east.

It is named after the surname of the Earls and Dukes of Bedford; the freehold remains with the latter's conservation trusts who have agreed public access and management by Camden Council. The gardens are in the mainstream, initial category (of Grade II listing) on the Register of Historic Parks and Gardens.

== History ==
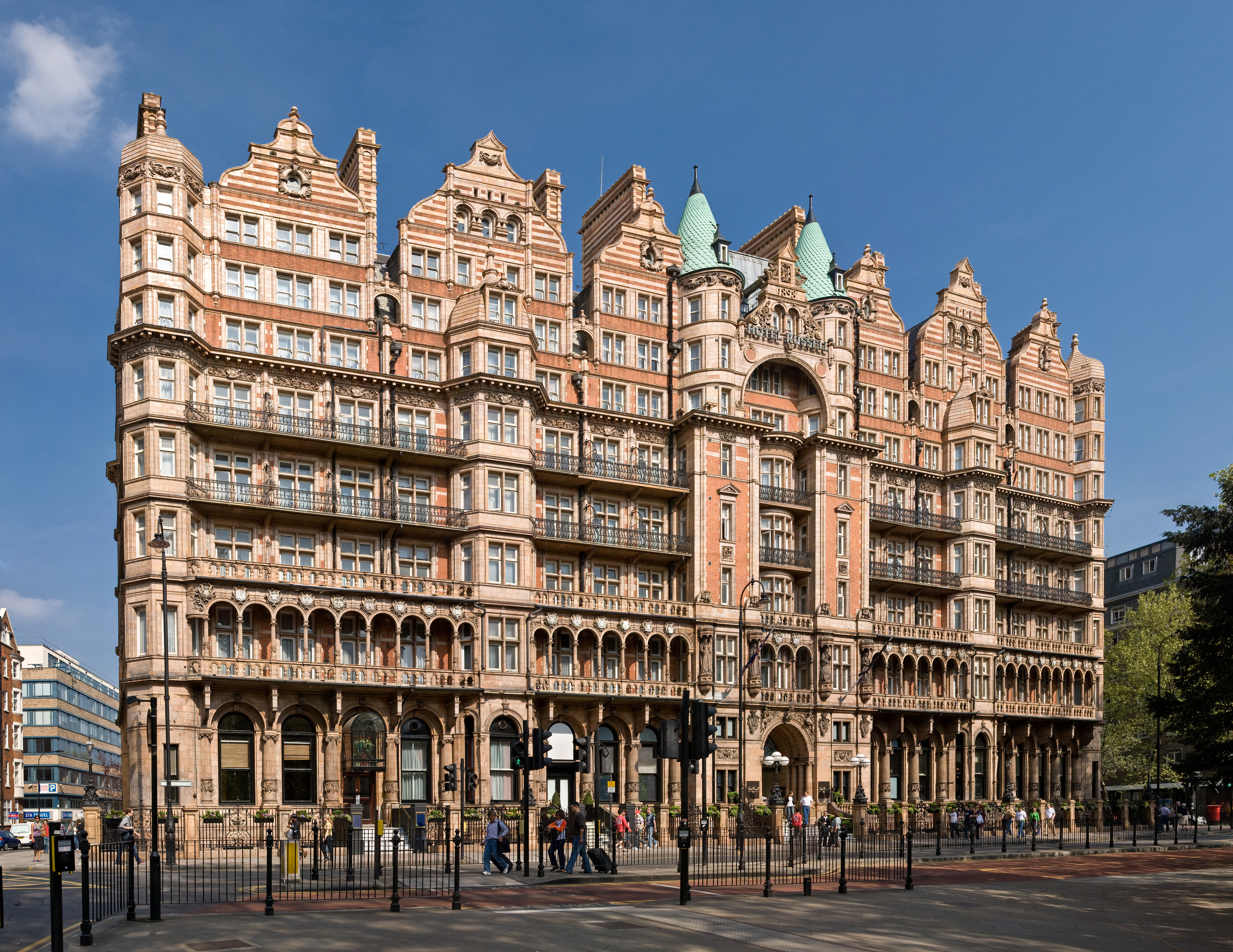
Kimpton Fitzroy London

Following the demolition of Bedford House, Russell Square and Bedford Square were laid out in 1804. The square is named after the surname of the Earls and Dukes of Bedford, who developed the family's London landholdings in the 17th and 18th centuries. Between 1805 and 1830, Thomas Lawrence had a studio at number 65. Other past residents include the famous 19th-century architectural father-and-son partnership, Philip and Philip Charles Hardwick, who lived at number 60 in the 1850s.

On the eastern side the Hotel Russell, built in 1898 to a design by Charles Fitzroy Doll, dominates (its builders were connected with the company which created RMS Titanic), alongside the Imperial Hotel, which was also designed by Charles Fitzroy Doll and built from 1905 to 1911. The old Imperial building was demolished in 1967.

The square contained large terraced houses aimed mainly at upper-middle-class families. A number of the original houses survive, especially on the southern and western sides. Those to the west are occupied by the University of London, and there is a blue plaque on one at the north-west corner commemorating the fact that T. S. Eliot worked there from the late 1920s when he was poetry editor of Faber & Faber. That building is now used by the School of Oriental and African Studies (a college of the University of London).

In 1998, the London Mathematical Society moved from rooms in Burlington House to De Morgan House, at 57–58 Russell Square, in order to accommodate staff expansion.

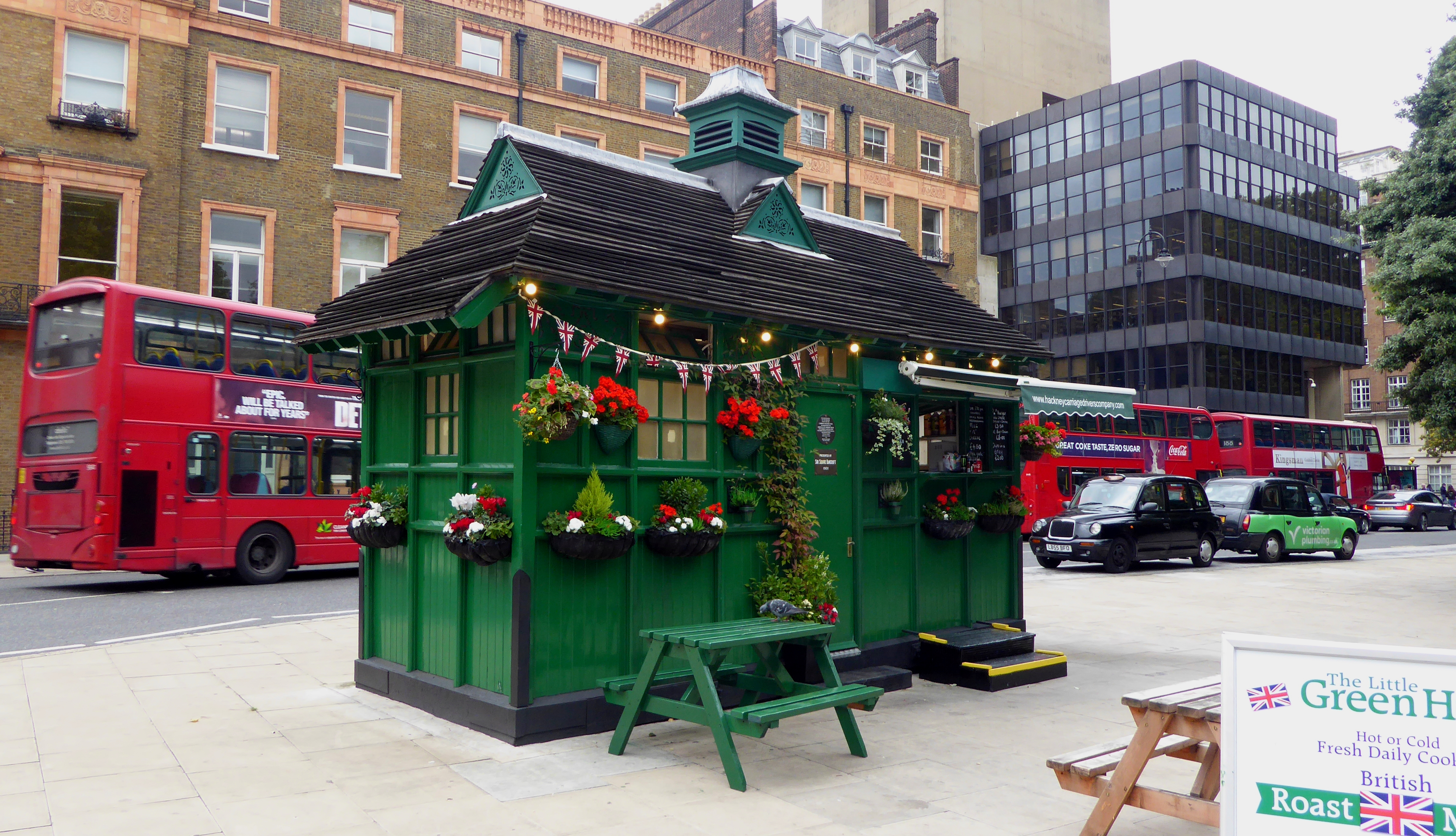
Russell Square cabmen's shelter

Students from Sierra Leone at the Colonial Centre at 17 Russell Square, 1944

The Cabmen's Shelter Fund was established in London in 1875 to run shelters for the drivers of hansom cabs and later hackney carriages (and taxicabs).

In 2002, the square was re-landscaped in a style based on the original early 19th century layout by Humphry Repton (1752–1818).

Since 2004, the two buildings on the southern side, at numbers 46 and 47, have been occupied by the Huron University USA in London (now the London campus for EF International Language Centres and is the Centre for Professional Students over the age of 25).

On 7 July 2005, two terrorist bombings occurred near the square. One of them was on a London Underground train at that moment running between King's Cross St Pancras tube station and Russell Square tube station, and another was on a bus on Tavistock Square, near Russell Square. To commemorate the victims, many flowers were laid at a spot on Russell Square just south of the café. The location is now marked by a memorial plaque and a young oak tree.

The square was also the site of a mass stabbing in 2016.

The London Branch of École Jeannine Manuel has occupied 52–53 Russell Square since 2019.

Russell Square has been a notable location for public demonstrations, including protests organised by The Palestine Coalition, which garnered media attention in 2026. The Metropolitan Police has set specific conditions for Palestine-related demonstrations in the square and throughout central London, as several pro-Palestine protesters were arrested for chanting "globalise the intifada".

== Literature and culture ==
=== Literature ===
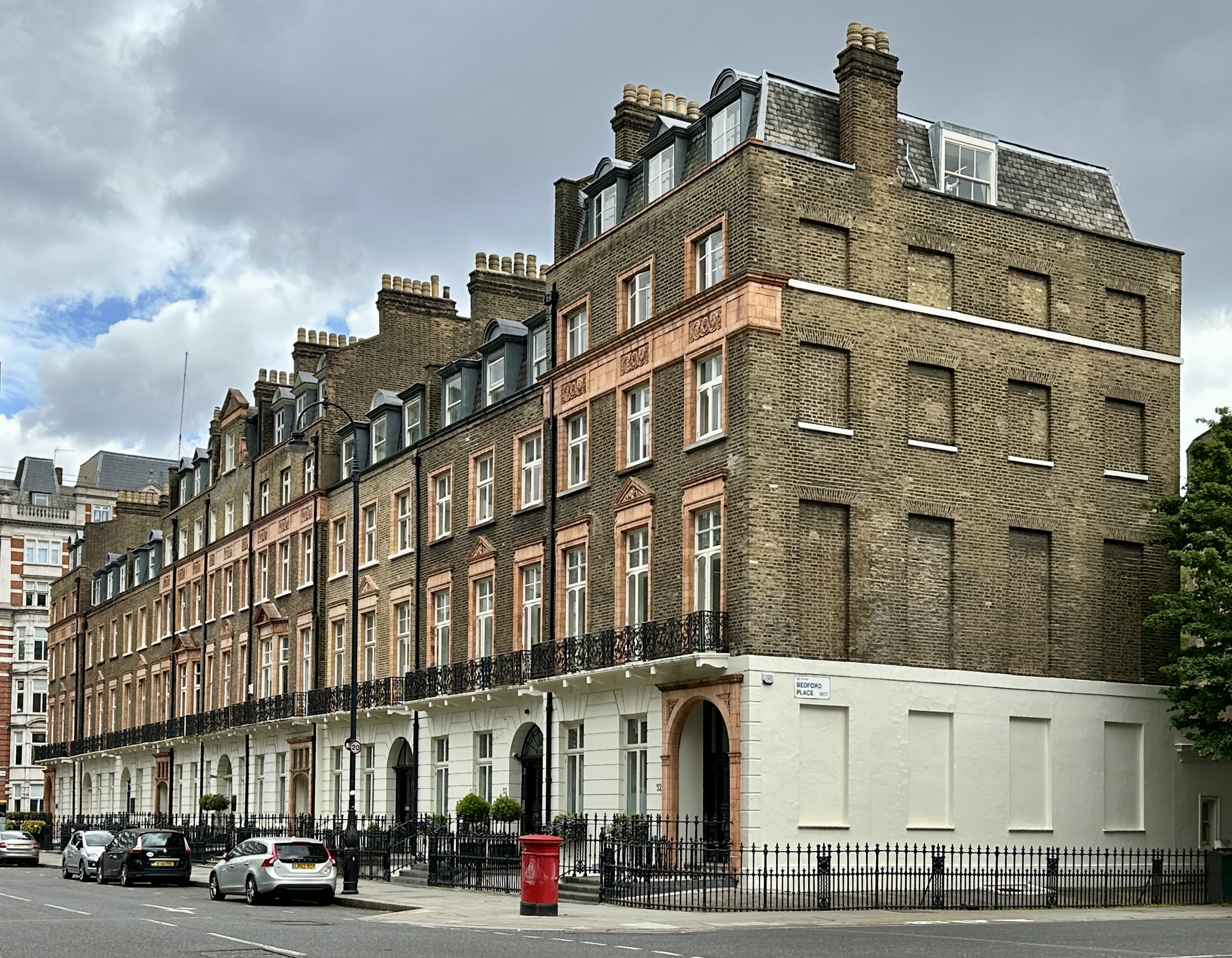
The southern side of Russell Square includes the 19th century houses at 52 to 60, which are Grade II listed

Russell Square appears in various novels. In the early chapters of Thackeray's Vanity Fair (1848), set in about 1812, Russell Square is evoked as the residence of "John Sedley, Esquire, of Russell Square, and the Stock Exchange." Virginia Woolf set many scenes of her novel Night and Day (1919) in Russell Square.

Jenny Chawleigh, daughter of business man Jonathan Chawleigh, lives with her father in Russell Square before she marries the protagonist, Captain Adam Deveril (Viscount Lynton), in Georgette Heyer's Regency romance novel "A Civil Contract", published in 1961. They converse about the history of the Square on Lord Lynton's first visit to the house, and Mr. Chawleigh is not impressed with the statue of the Duke of Bedford.

21 Russell Square is the murderer's street address in the novel (but not in the movie adaptation) The Murderer Lives at Number 21 (L'Assassin habite au 21) by the Belgian writer Stanislas-André Steeman. In John Dickson Carr's detective novel The Hollow Man, the victim, Professor Grimaud, lives in a house on the western side of Russell Square. In Alan Hollinghurst's novel The Swimming Pool Library (1988), the protagonist William Beckwith spends time here with his lover who works in a hotel overlooking the square.

In chapter 6 ("Rendezvous") of John Wyndham's novel The Day of the Triffids (1951) the main characters William (Bill) Masen and Josella Playton are photographed by Elspeth Cary in Russell Square while practicing with triffid guns. In Ben Aaronovitch's Peter Grant books, the first of which is The Rivers of London (also known as Midnight Riot), The Folly – headquarters of British wizardry – is located in Russell Square.

=== Television ===
Russell Square is the location of the eponymous bookshop in the Channel 4 sitcom Black Books. In the BBC's 2010 Sherlock episode entitled "A Study in Pink", Russell Square is the park in which the character of Dr Watson is re-acquainted with his previous classmate Mike Stamford. The Imperial Hotel façade that lines Russell Square serves as a backdrop for the park-bench conversation between them.

== See also ==
- List of eponymous roads in London
- Other squares of the Bedford Estate in Bloomsbury included:
  - Bedford Square
  - Bloomsbury Square
  - Gordon Square
  - Mecklenburgh Square
  - Tavistock Square
  - Torrington Square
  - Woburn Square
- Baltimore House on Russell Square
