= Principal Hotel Company =

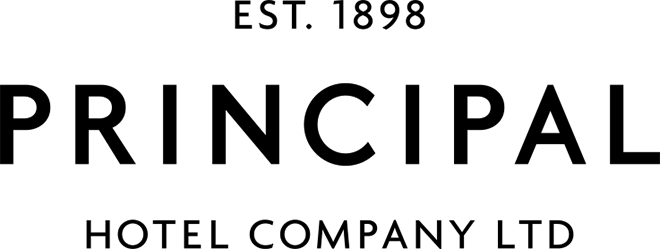
- Type: Private
- Industry: Hospitality
- Founded: 1984
- Area served: United Kingdom; France
- Revenue: £160.9 million (2013)
- Parent: Intercontinental Hotels Group
- Website: www.phcompany.com

Principal Hotel Company is a British hotel and conference venue operator headquartered in Harrogate, England.

== History ==
A predecessor company was founded in 1984. In 1992, when the chain had 18 properties, it went bankrupt during a recession. Two years later, in 1994, a former operations director of the chain, Tony Troy, led a management buyout for £68 million by Bridgepoint Capital. In 2001, Principal Hotels was sold to Nomura International Plc for £255 million, with Troy staying on as managing director. Nomura had just bought Le Méridien and rebranded the hotels to that chain.

The company was reconstituted in 2004, when Le Méridien faced financial difficulties, and Troy took control back of the London, Manchester, York and Leeds properties. In 2006, the chain was sold by the Royal Bank of Scotland to the private equity firm Permira. In 2007, Principal Hotels sold their physical hotel properties to aAIM Group for £270 million and leased them back. That same year, the chain bought Hayley Conference Hotels, becoming the Principal Hayley Group.

In 2009, it expanded through the purchase of two venues from the collapsed group The Real Hotel Company and opened two new venues in France and Spain.

In 2010 the company was taken over by Lloyds, following financial difficulty. In 2012, the company bought back the hotels it had sold to aAim for £200m. In February 2013, Lloyds sold the group to the American investment company Starwood Capital Group for £360 million.

In November 2016, Principal Hayley Group went through a major rebranding and re-investment project. The group was renamed as the Principal Hotel Company and split their portfolio between two groups of hotels; Principal (a group of luxury city hotels) and De Vere (a group of country estate hotels). In September 2017, De Vere relaunched with 22 locations and announced the sale of 20 non-core hotels. In December 2017, the Wychwood Park hotel was sold to Mokan Hotels Company for £8 million.

In May 2018, Fonciere des Regions and the InterContinental Hotels Group bought the chain from Starwood Capital for $1.1 billion, with FdR acquiring the underlying property assets and IHG taking over management of the hotels. IHG announced that some Principal Hotels would be rebranded as Kimpton Hotels.

Principal Hotel Company advertises that it was established in 1898, as that is the year the oldest hotel in its chain, Kimpton Fitzroy London Hotel, opened, under unrelated ownership.

== Locations ==
The company operates 12 locations in the UK.

Location	Name
London	Kimpton Fitzroy London Hotel
Edinburgh	Kimpton Charlotte Square Hotel
Edinburgh	InterContinental Edinburgh The George
Glasgow	Kimpton Blythswood Square Hotel
Glasgow	voco Grand Central Glasgow
Manchester	Kimpton Clocktower Hotel
York	The Principal York
Cardiff	voco St David's Cardiff Hotel
Sandford-on-Thames	voco Oxford Thames
Oxford	voco Oxford Spires
Dorking	Wotton House
Leeds	The Met Hotel

== Governance ==
- CEO : Tony Troy
