= 2016 Russell Square stabbing =

- Location: 51°31′18″N 0°7′34″W; Russell Square, Bloomsbury, London, United Kingdom
- Date: 3 August 2016; 22:39 (UTC+01:00)
- Attack type: Mass stabbing
- Weapon: Knife
- Deaths: 1
- Injuries: 5
- Perpetrator: Zakaria Bulhan

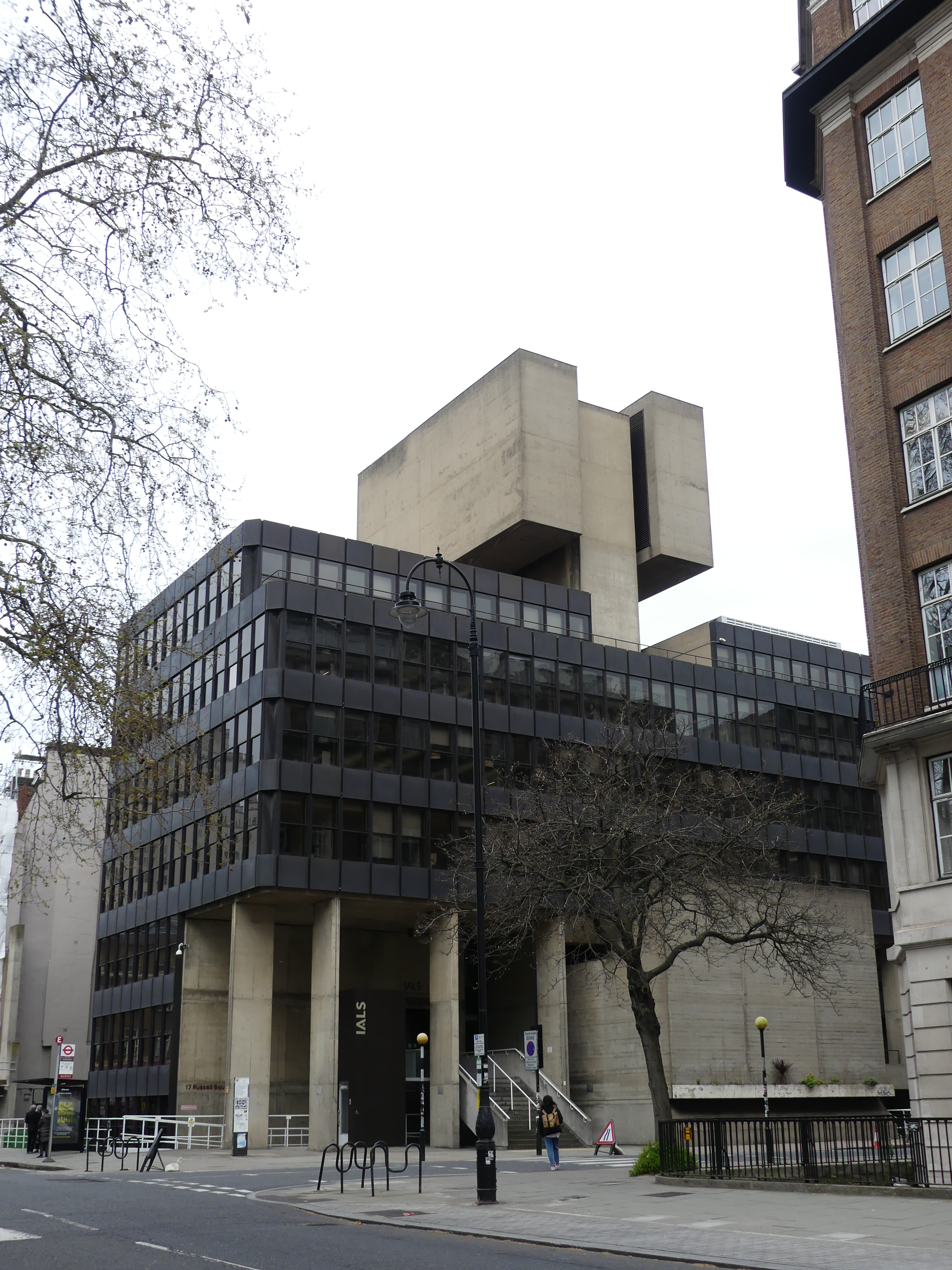
Russell Square, London WC1

On 3 August 2016, a mass stabbing occurred in Russell Square, London. Six people were stabbed, one fatally, before a suspect, identified as Zakaria Bulhan, was apprehended by police and charged with murder and attempted murder. The media initially linked the stabbing to terrorism, but later shifted its focus to possible mental disorders.

== Events ==
London's Metropolitan Police Service and London Ambulance Service arrived at the scene of the attacks six minutes after emergency services were called at 22:33. Less than ten minutes later, a man was arrested at the scene after being tasered by police.

=== Victims ===
Six people, apparently selected at random, were stabbed. A 64-year-old American, Darlene Horton, died at the scene. She had planned to fly back to Florida the following day. An American man, a British man, an Australian man, an Australian woman, and an Israeli woman were injured. The British man, Bernard Hepplewhite, underwent emergency surgery for a serious abdominal wound and remained in hospital for several days.

== Perpetrator ==
Zakaria Bulhan was a 19-year-old male Norwegian national of Somali descent. He was described as a Muslim who "didn't really talk about religion." He moved from Norway in 2002, and was unemployed and living with his mother and younger brother in Tooting, South London.

Not long before the stabbing, Bulhan completed his first studies at South Thames College, and had been a patient at a psychiatric facility near Russell Square. According to a family friend, Bulhan called an ambulance three separate times in the last six months, claiming he wanted to harm himself.

In his 2017 book, Media, Diaspora and the Somali Conflict, Idil Osman speculates that the "cultural stigma" associated with mental illness in Somali society makes it less likely that individuals and families of disturbed persons like Bulhan will seek treatment.

=== Legal proceedings ===
Following his arrest, Bulhan was treated in hospital and later held in custody at a police station in South London. On 5 August, he was charged with the murder of Horton, along with five counts of attempted murder. He appeared at Westminster Magistrates' Court on 6 August, where he was remanded in custody. The trial was expected to take place in February 2017. In February 2017, Bulhan admitted killing US tourist Darlene Horton and injuring five others in Russell Square in 2016.

He was sentenced on 7 February to be detained for an indefinite period in a maximum security hospital.

=== Investigation ===
The Metropolitan Police initially said they were exploring terrorism as a possible motive. They later said the investigation "increasingly points" to the attack being "triggered by mental health issues", and that the stabbings were random. Norwegian police cooperated in the investigation.

== Reactions ==
In an interview after the attack, the Mayor of London, Sadiq Khan, said, "London is one of the safest capitals in the world". He added, "It is a reality in 2016 – especially when you look at what happened in Nice, in Brussels, in Munich, in parts of America – we've always got to be vigilant and never complacent."

Kenan Malik described the attack as highlighting "the difficulty... in drawing a distinction between jihadi violence and the fury of disturbed minds."

== See also ==
- 2015 Leytonstone tube station attack
