= Charles Fitzroy Doll =

English architect

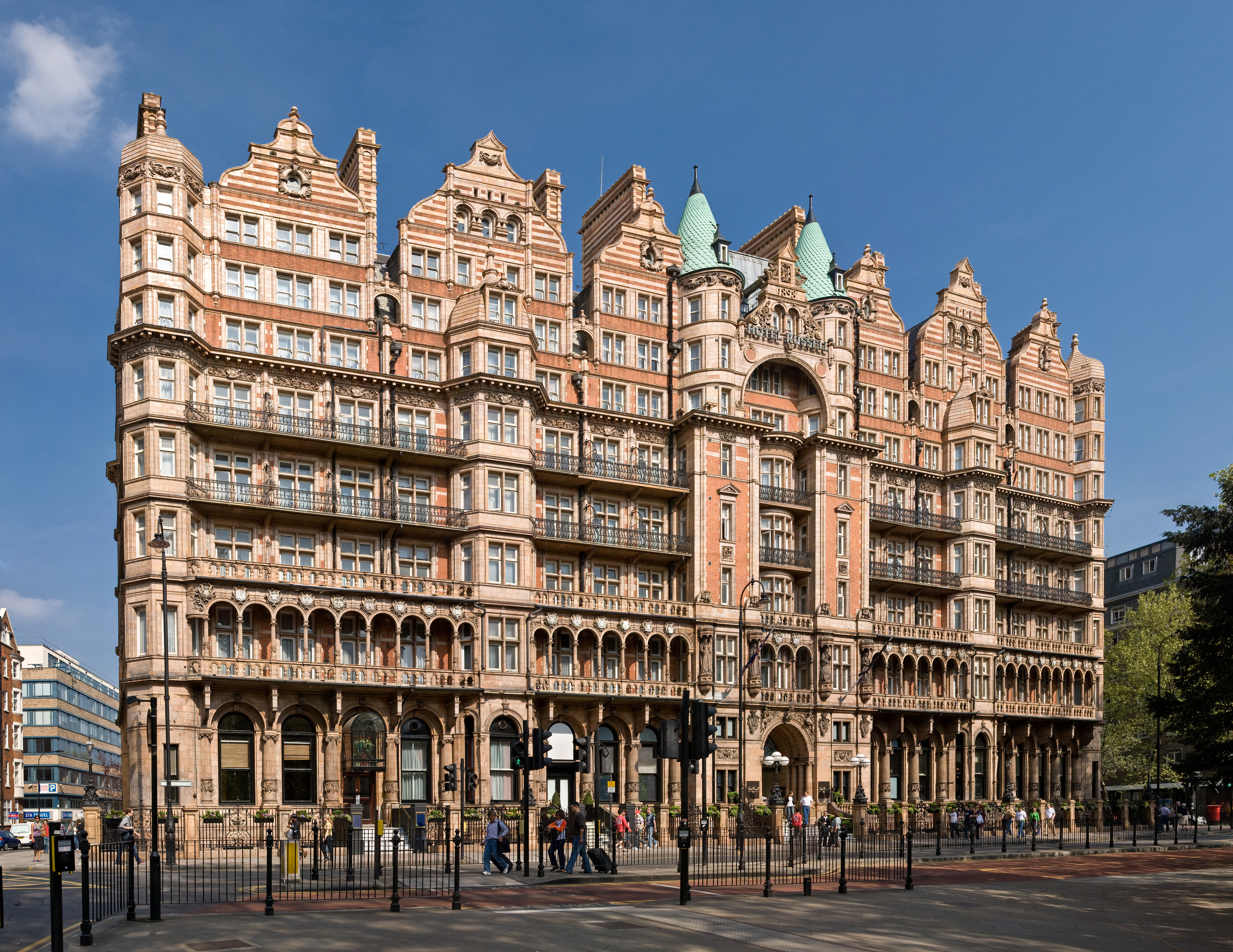
The Hotel Russell in Bloomsbury, designed by Doll in 1898

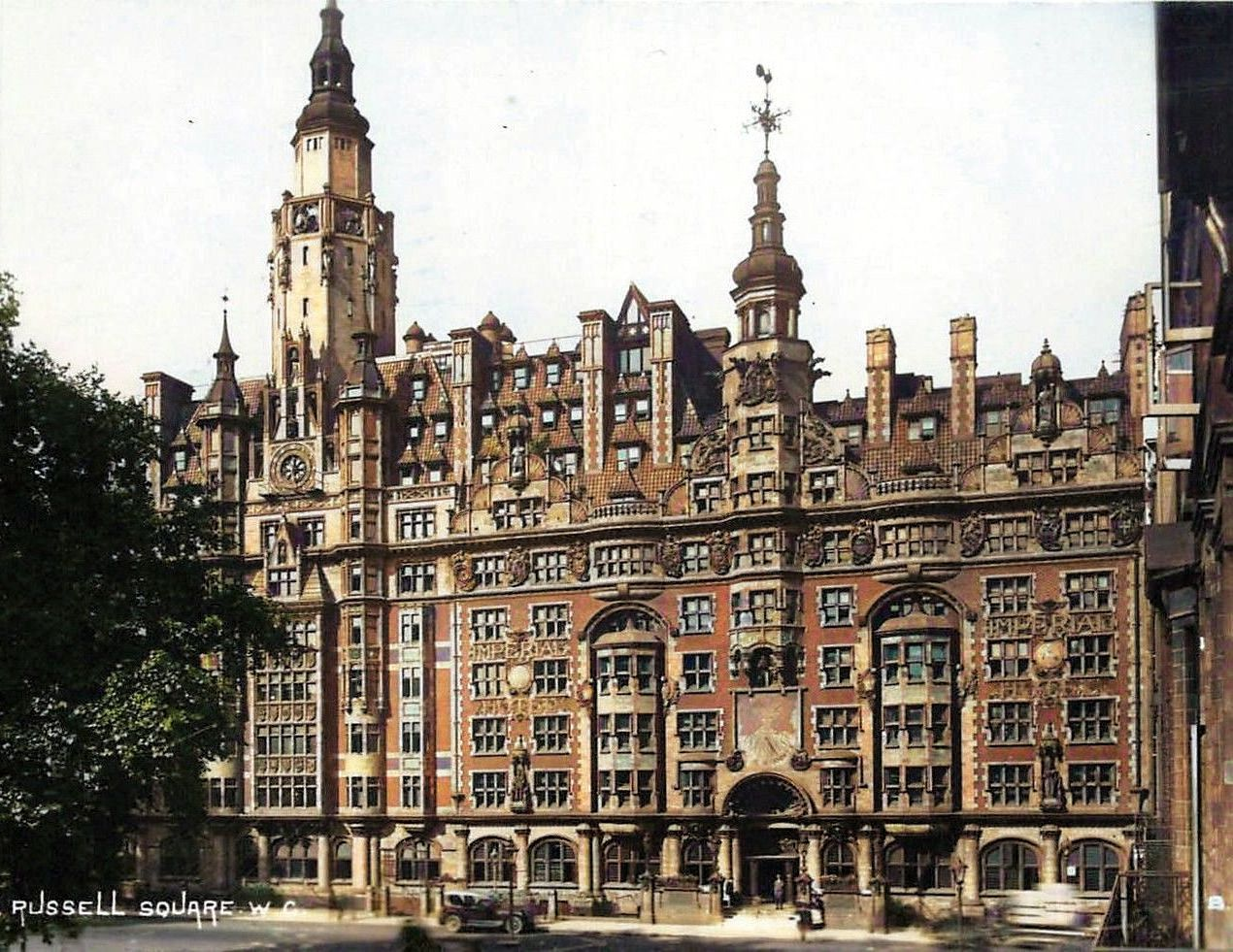
The Imperial Hotel at Russell Square, designed by Doll in 1905

Charles Fitzroy Doll JP, FRIBA (1850–1929) was an English architect of the Victorian and Edwardian eras who specialised in designing hotels. He also designed the dining room on the RMS Titanic, basing it on his design for the dining room in the Hotel Russell in Bloomsbury.

Doll was educated in Germany, and on his return to Britain he trained as an architect under Sir Matthew Digby Wyatt. Under Wyatt's guidance, he was involved in designing the India Office in London, a project he worked on from 1866 to 1868. In 1885, Doll was appointed Surveyor to the Bedford Estates in Bloomsbury and Covent Garden in London. In 1898, he designed the Hotel Russell, distinctively clad in decorative thé-au-lait ("tea with milk") terracotta, and based on the Château de Madrid on the Bois de Boulogne in Paris. Doll engaged the sculptor Henry Charles Fehr to model the four life-size statues of British Queens, who looked down from above the main front entrance. The hotel's restaurant, until recently named Fitzroy Doll's, is reputed to be almost identical to the RMS Titanic's dining room, which he also designed.

Later, Doll designed the Imperial Hotel in Russell Square, which was described by Pevsner as a 'vicious mixture of Art Nouveau Gothic and Art Nouveau Tudor'. It was demolished in 1967, and replaced by a contemporary, brutalist building designed by George Anthony Wilson Brandeth. In 1907, Doll designed the Flemish French-Gothic terrace of shops with apartments over them in Torrington Place.

Doll married Emily Francis Tyler, the daughter of William George Bygrave Tyler and Elizabeth Emily Mackinnon, on 26 August 1879. Their five children included Christian Charles Tyler Doll, who inherited his father's architectural practice and was involved in the reconstruction of the grand staircase of the Palace of King Minos at Knossos in Crete.

A member of Holborn Borough Council, he served as Mayor of Holborn in 1904–1905 and 1912–1913.

Charles Fitzroy Doll lived at Hadham Towers in Much Hadham in Hertfordshire, where he was a Justice of the Peace. He died in 1929 aged 79.
