= Real Hotel Company =

British company

The Real Hotel Company was a hotel firm which was founded in 1877 and went into administration in 2009.

== History ==
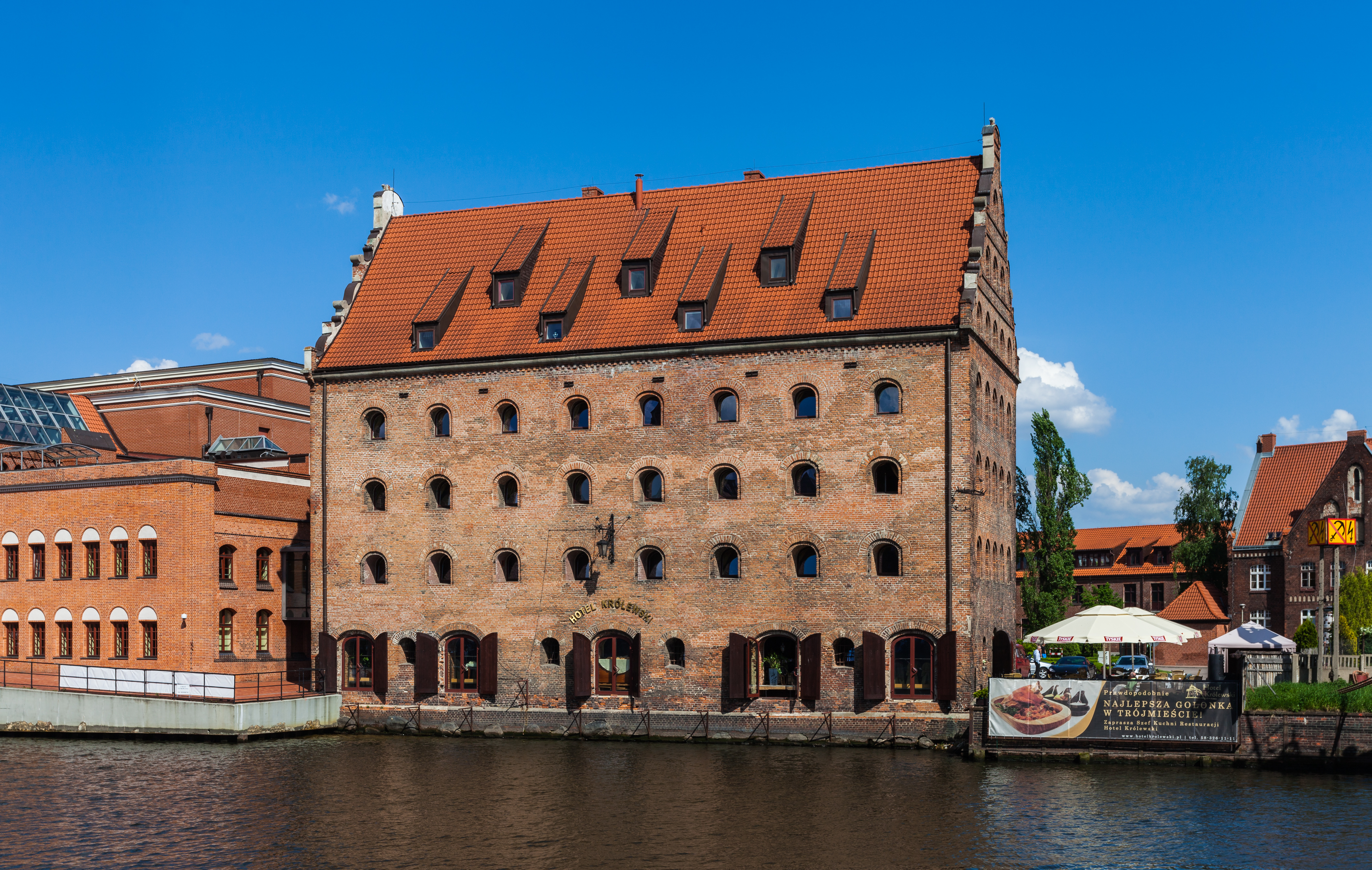
Real Hotel in Gdańsk, Poland.

The company was founded as the Birmingham Artisans' Club-house Company in 1875, initially providing reading rooms. In June 1877 it expanded into coffee houses, and was renamed Birmingham Coffee House Company, although the formal company name was not changed until 1901. It evolved through the early 20th century, ecoming the Arden and Cobden Hotels in 1940.

The company owned three Birmingham properties: the Arden Hotel, Cobden Hotel and Norfolk Hotel.

The Cobden Hotel was constructed by the company in 1881-1883, located on a leased site on the corner of Corporation Street and Cherry Street (52°28′50″N 1°53′48″W). The lease expired in 1959, and the company was unable to obtain an extension, with the site having been acquired by Harrods for a new Rackhams department store. A new Cobden Hotel was opened at 170 Hagley Road to replace it (52°28′18″N 1°56′21″W).

The Arden Hotel was opened by the company in 1898 as the Hen and Chicken Hotel on a site at 140 New Street adjacent to the King Edward VI Grammar School (52°28′43″N 1°53′46″W). The name was changed to the Arden Hotel in 1938, in order to sound less like a pub. It closed in 1972 and was demolished.

The Norfolk Hotel was opened by the company in 1948 on the Hagley Road.

In December 1985 the company was bought by Henry Edwards, an entrepreneur. In 1986, he floated the company under the name of Friendly Hotels on the London Stock Exchange.

The company became a franchisee of Choice Hotels International (CHI), a US-based hotel group, in 1996. It rebranded its Friendly Hotels and Friendly Stop Inns with the Comfort Inn and Quality Hotel brand names. The relationship prospered and in 1996, the company gained the master franchise from CHI to develop the Choice brands in the UK and Ireland, followed, in 1998, by the master franchise to develop the Comfort, Quality, Clarion and Sleep Inn brands across Continental Europe (excluding Scandinavia).

In June 2001, CHI revealed that it was talking to several potential buyers about selling its stake in the company. In order to demonstrate synergy with CHI, the company changed its name from Friendly Hotels to CHE Group PLC in August 2001. The talks with buyers ended in February 2002, and having failed to find a buyer, CHI simply wrote off its interest in the company.

In October 2007, the company announced the launch of its new brand, Purple Hotels, and changed to The Real Hotel Company.

However, the economic downturn hit the company hard, and it slid into losses in 2007. The company announced the suspension of the company's ordinary shares on the Alternative Investment Market on 13 January 2009. The company was placed into administration with Shay Bannon and Antony Nygate of BDO Stoy Hayward appointed as the administrators on 21 January 2009.

The final property disposed of was the Quality Hotel in Perth which was sold in February 2011.
