= Timeline of the surrender of Axis forces at the end of World War II =

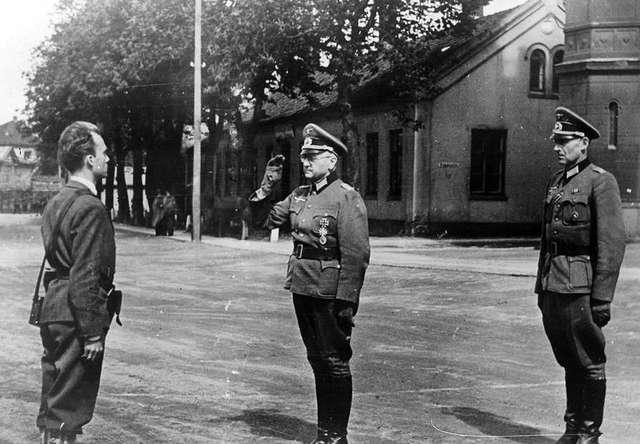
The German surrender at Akershus Fortress (Norway) on 11 May 1945

This is a timeline showing surrenders of the various fighting groups of the Axis forces that also marked ending time of World War II:

== Table of surrenders ==
Country	Forces it applies to	Number of soldiers surrendering (if applicable)	Commanding Officer	Date surrender document signed (if applicable)	Date surrender document took effect (if applicable)	Notes
Netherlands	Kampfgruppen "General Seyffardt" of the 23rd SS Volunteer Panzer Grenadier Division Nederland in Halbe, Germany	500	Jürgen Wagner?	May 1	May 1	
Italy/Germany	All forces of the Italian Social Republic and German land forces under Italian command	429,000	Maresciallo d'Italia Rodolfo Graziani	April 29	May 2, at 12:00 PM	
Germany	Army Group C, in Italy and Western Austria	nearly 1,000,000	Obergruppenführer Karl Wolff	April 29	May 2, at 12:00 PM	
Belgium (Flemish)	27th SS Volunteer Division Langemarck, at Mecklenburg-Vorpommern	6,000?	Thomas Müller	May 2	May 2	
Latvia	Components of the 15th Waffen Grenadier Division of the SS, south of Schwerin, Germany	c. 4,500	Karl Burk	May 2	May 2	
Germany/ France/ Other	All forces in Berlin, Germany	480,000 (470,970 Germans, 30 French and 9,000 other foreigners)	General der Artillerie Helmuth Weidling	May 2	May 2, at 6:00 PM	
Germany	XXI Army and the Third Panzer Army at Hagenow, Germany	300,000	General der Infanterie Kurt von Tippelskirch (XXI Army); General der Panzertruppe Hasso von Manteuffel (III Panzer Army)	Night of May 2–3	May 3	
Netherlands	Kampfgruppen "de Ruys" of the 23rd SS Volunteer Panzer Grenadier Division Nederland, west of Parchim, Germany	500	Jürgen Wagner?	May 3	May 3	
Germany	36th Waffen Grenadier Division of the SS	700	None	May 3	May 3	
Germany	Army Group H, in Northwest Germany, Schleswig-Holstein, Heligoland, the Frisian Islands, Denmark and other islands near Northwest Germany and remnants of Army Group Vistula in Mecklenburg-Vorpommern	880,000	Generaladmiral Hans-Georg von Friedeburg and General der Infanterie Eberhard Kinzel	May 4	May 5, at 8:00 AM	Instrument of surrender received by Field-Marshal Montgomery at Lüneburg Heath
Hungary	25th Waffen Grenadier Division of the SS Hunyadi (1st Hungarian) and 26th Waffen Grenadier Division of the SS (2nd Hungarian), near Lake Attersee	c. 29,606 (19,106 in the 25th, and 10,500 in the 26th)	Józef Grassy	May 3–5	May 5	Part of Army Group H
Germany	U-291, U-779, U-883, U-1103, U-1406, U-1407, U-2341 and U-2356	257-306? (44-60? on U-291, 48-56? on U-779, 55-64? on U-883, 44-52? on U-1103, 19? on U-1406, 19? on U-1407, 14-18? on U-2341 and 14-18? on U-2356)	Hermann Neumeister (U-291), Johann Stegmann (U-779), Johanes Uebel (U-883), Wilhelm Eisele (U-1103), Werner Klug (U-1406), Horst Heitz (U-1407), Hermann Böhm (U-2341) and Friedrich Hartel (U-2356)	May 5	May 5	Surrendered in Cuxhaven
Germany	U-2351	14-18?	Werner Brückner	May 5	May 5	Surrendered in Flensburg
Germany	U-143, U-145, U-149, U-150, U-368, U-720 and U-1230	236-268? (25? on U-143, 25? on U-145, 25? on U-149, 25? on U-150, 44-60? on U-368, 44-60? on U-720 and 48? on U-1230)	Walter Kasparek (U-143), Friedrich-Karl Görner (U-145), Helmut Plohr (U-149), Jürgen Kriegshammer (U-150), Götz Roth (U-368), Wolf-Harald Schüer (U-720) and Hans Hilbig (U-1230)	May 5	May 5	Surrendered in Heligoland
Germany	U-155, U-680 and U-1233	144-168? (48-60? on U-155, 48-60? on U-680, and 48? on U-1233)	Friedrich Altmeier (U-155), Max Ulber (U-680), and Heinrich Niemeyer (U-1233)	May 5	May 5	Surrendered in Baring Bay off Fredericia
Germany	All forces in the Netherlands	120,000	Johannes Blaskowitz	May 4	May 5, at 4:00 PM	Separate surrender from the surrender in Northwest Germany and Denmark
Germany	U-806	48?	Klaus Hornbostel	May 6	May 6	Surrendered in Aarhus
Other	17th SS Panzergrenadier Division Götz von Berlichingen, at Rottach-Egern	8,811	Georg Bochmann	May 6	May 6	
Germany	Army Group G, in Bavaria	400,000	Hermann Foertsch	May 4, at 2:30 PM	May 6, at 12:00 PM	
Germany	All forces in Breslau	45,000	Hermann Niehoff	May 6	May 6, at 6:00 PM	
Germany/ Soviet Union	Twelfth Army and remnants of the Ninth Army, at Tangermünde	c. 200,000 (195,000 German, 5,000 troops from the Soviet Union)	Walther Wenck (12 Army)	May 7	May 7	No commander for the 9th Army
Germany	All forces in La Rochelle	c. 22,000?	Ernst Schirlitz	May 9, morning	May 8, morning (antidated)	
Germany	Army Group Ostmark	~450,000 (as of May 1)	Lothar Rendulic	May 7, at 6:00 PM	May 8, at 00:01 AM	Surrendered in Reith, near Salzburg
Germany/ Italy	All forces on the Dodecanese Islands	c. 5,600 (more than 5,000 Germans and 600 Italians)	Otto Wagener	May 8	May 8, at 10:00 AM	
Germany	U-1198	44-56?	Gerhard Peters	May 8	May 8	Surrendered in Cuxhaven
Hungary (Germans)	18th SS Volunteer Panzergrenadier Division Horst Wessel, in Czechoslovakia	4,000?	Heinrich Petersen	May 8	May 8	
Germany	1st Naval Infantry Division, along the Oder	2,000?	Wilhelm Bleckwenn	May 8	May 8	
Germany	2nd Naval Infantry Division, in Schleswig-Holstein	2,000?	Werner-Graf von Bassewitz-Levetzow	May 8	May 8	
Germany	6th Parachute Division	Unknown	Hermann Plocher	May 8	May 8	
Germany	7th Parachute Division, in Oldenburg	Unknown	Wolfgang Erdmann	May 8	May 8	
Germany	1st Fallschirm-Panzer Division Hermann Göring, in Dresden	5,000?	Max Lemke	May 8	May 8	
Germany	32nd SS Volunteer Grenadier Division 30 Januar, in Tangermünde	5,000?	Hans Kempin	May 8	May 8	
Germany	38th SS Division Nibelungen, in Alpen-Donau, Germany	6,000?	Martin Strange	May 8	May 8	
Germany	4th SS Polizei Panzergrenadier Division, along the Elbe River	c. 9,000?	Walter Harzer	May 8	May 8	
Germany	35th SS and Police Grenadier Division, along the Elbe	Unknown	None	May 8	May 8	Commanding officer killed on April 25
Germany	10th Parachute Division, in Austria	Unknown	Hans Kreysing	May 8	May 8	
Russia (Cossacks)	XV SS Cossack Cavalry Corps in Austria	50,000	Hermann von Pannwitz	May 8	May 8	
Hungary (German)	31st SS Volunteer Grenadier Division, in Czechoslovakia	10,000?	Wilhelm Trabandt	May 8	May 8	
Germany	16th SS Panzergrenadier Division Reichsführer-SS, in Klagenfurt, Austria	c. 14,000?	Otto Baum	May 8	May 8	
Germany	9th SS Panzer Division Hohenstaufen, in Linz, Austria	c. 6,000?	Sylvester Stadler	May 8	May 8	
Germany	6th SS Mountain Division Nord, in Austria	c. 2,000	Franz Schreiber	May 8	May 8	
Germany	12th SS Panzer Division Hitlerjugend, in Enns, Austria	c. 10,000	Hugo Kraas	May 8	May 8	Made up the bulk of the I SS Panzer Corps
India	Indian Legion, near Lake Constance	2,000	unknown	May 8?	May 8?	
Germany	10th SS Panzer Division Frundsberg, in Teplice, Czechoslovakia	c. 15,000?	Franz Roestel	May 8	May 8	
Germany	All German forces	N/A	Wilhelm Keitel	May 8, at 22:43 PM	May 8, at 23:01 PM	
Germany	All forces in Norway	c. 400,000	Franz Böhme	May 8, at 23:01 PM	May 8, at 23:01 PM	
Netherlands	Most of the 34th SS Volunteer Grenadier Division Landstorm Nederland, near Oosterbeek	5,956	Martin Kohlroser	May 9	May 9	
Germany	U-1194	48-56?	Herbert Zeissler	May 9	May 9	Surrendered in Cuxhaven
Germany	U-510	48?	Alfred Eick	May 9	May 9	Surrendered in St. Nazaire
Germany	All forces on Jersey	11,671	Vice Admiral Friedrich Hüffmeier	May 9	May 9, at 10:00 AM	
Hungary	37th SS Volunteer Cavalry Division Lützow, in Steyr	180	Karl Gesele	May 9	May 9	
Germany	1st SS Panzer Division Leibstandarte SS Adolf Hitler, in Steyr, Austria	c. 1,600	SS-Brigadeführer und Generalmajor der Waffen-SS Otto Kumm	May 9	May 9	Made up part of the I SS Panzer Corps
Various	5th SS Panzer Division Wiking, in Czechoslovakia	c. 14,000?	Karl Ullrich	May 9	May 9	
Germany	2nd SS Panzer Division Das Reich, in Czechoslovakia	c. 2,000?	SS-Standartenführer Karl Kreutz	May 9	May 9	
Germany	3rd SS Panzer Division Totenkopf, in Czechoslovakia	c. 1,000	Hellmuth Becker	May 9	May 9	
Yugoslav and Italian Germans	24th Waffen Mountain Division of the SS Karstjäger, in Yugoslavia	c. 3,000	Adolf Wagner	May 9	May 9	
Germany	All forces in the Danzig beachhead (Kępiny Wielkie, Mikoszewo, and Świbno), and in the Vistula Delta (Kępiny Małe, Kępki, Lubieszewo, Marzęcino, Nowy Dwór Gdański, Rybina, Stobna, Tujsk, Wierzno Wielkie, and Żelichowo), and the western Vistula Spit (excluding Narmeln)	c. 100,000	Dietrich von Saucken	May 9	May 9, at 11:00 AM	
Germany	All forces in Dunkirk	20,000	Friedrich Frisius	May 9, at 9:20 AM	May 9, at 4:00 PM	
Germany	All forces in Bornholm	c. 12,000	Gerhard von Kamptz	May 9	May 9, at 4:30 PM	
Germany	All forces on the western Curonian Spit	2,000–3,000?	?	May 10, 1945	May 10, 1945	
Germany	U-1272	44-52?	Hans Schatteburg	May 10	May 10	Surrendered in Bergen
Germany/ Latvia	Army Group Courland, in the Courland Pocket	c. 180,000 (165,000 Germans, 15,000 Latvians)	Carl Hilpert	May 10	May 10	
Germany	All forces in Lorient	c. 2,000?	General Wilhelm Fahrmbacher	May 8	May 10	
Germany	U-249	44-60?	Uwe Kock	May 10	May 10	Surrendered in Portland, United Kingdom
Germany	U-1009, U-1058, U-1105 and U-1305	180-216?	Dietrich Zehle (U-1009), Hermann Bruder (U-1058), Hans-Joachim Schwarz (U-1105) and Helmuth Christiansen (U-1305)	May 10	May 10	Surrendered in Loch Eriboll
Germany	U-1023	44-52?	Heinrich-Andreas Schroeteler	May 10	May 10	Surrendered in Weymouth, Dorset
Germany	All forces on Sark	281	Vice Admiral Friedrich Hüffmeier	May 9	May 10	
Galicia (Ukrainians)	1st Ukrainian Division of the Ukrainian National Army, in Italy	25,000?	Pavlo Shandruk	May 10	May 10	
Croatia	373rd (Croatian) Infantry Division, west of Sisak	2,000?	Hans Gravenstein	May 10	May 10	
Germany	All forces in Saint-Nazaire	28,000	Major General Werner Junck	May 8	May 11	
Estonia	Most of the 20th Waffen Grenadier Division of the SS, at Mělník, Czechoslovakia	7,000?	Berthold Maack	May 11	May 11	Part of the III Panzer Corps
Estonia	Elements of the 20th Waffen Grenadier Division of the SS (1st Estonian), in Czechoslovakia	3,000	unknown	May 11	May 11	
Germany	Army Group Centre	c. 580,000	Ferdinand Schörner	May 11	May 11	Schörner himself surrendered days later.
Germany	U-293, U-802 and U-826	140-164?	Erich Steinbrink (U-293), Helmut Schmoeckel (U-802) and Olaf Lübcke	May 11	May 11	Surrendered in Loch Eriboll
Germany	U-3008	57?	Helmut Manseck	May 11	May 11	Surrendered in Kiel
Croatia	369th (Croatian) Infantry Division, near Bleiburg, Austria	c. 2,000	Fritz Neidholdt	May 11	May 11	
Germans from various areas	7th SS Volunteer Mountain Division Prinz Eugen, in Celje, Slovenia	20,000?	August Schmidthuber	May 11	May 11	
Germany	All forces on Crete	10,000	General Hans-Georg Benthack	May 9	May 10	Surrendered at the Villa Ariadne at Knossos. https://www.bsa.ac.uk/about-us/knossos-research-centre/history-knossos/
Croatia	13th Waffen Mountain Division of the SS Handschar (1st Croatian)	12,000?	Desiderius Hampel	May 12	May 12	
Germany	All forces on Guernsey	11,755	Vice Admiral Friedrich Hüffmeier	May 9	May 12, at 2:00 PM	
Germany	All forces under Carl Friedrich von Pückler-Burghauss	c. 6,000	Carl Friedrich von Pückler-Burghauss	May 12	May 12	See Battle of Slivice
Germany	U-1109	44-52?	Friedrich von Riesen	May 12	May 12	Surrendered in Loch Eriboll
Germany	U-218	44?	Rupprecht Stock	May 12	May 12	Surrendered in Bergen
Germany	U-485 and U-541	92-108? (44-60? on U-485 and 48 on U-541)	Friedrich Lutz (U-485) and Kurt Petersen (U-541)	May 12	May 12	Surrendered in Gibraltar
Germany	U-532, U-825, U-956 and U-1231	184-216?	Ottoheinrich Junker (U-532), Gerhard Stoelker (U-825), Hans-Dieter Mohs (U-956) and Helmut Wicke (U-1231)	May 13	May 13	Surrendered in Loch Eriboll
Germany	U-739	44-60?	Johannes Ney	May 13	May 13	Surrendered in Emden, Germany
Germany	U-1102	44-57?	Erwin Sell	May 13	May 13	Surrendered in Hohwacht Bay
Germany	U-889	48?	Friedrich Braeucker	May 13	May 13	Surrendered in Shelbourne, Canada
Germany	All forces in the Hel Peninsula	2,000-5,000?	?	May 14	May 14	
Russia	Russian Liberation Army (1st Division)	c. 20,000	Sergei Bunyachenko	May 14	May 14	Ordered to disband.
Germany	U-244, U-516, U-764 and U-1010	180-220?	Hans-Peter Mackeprang (U-244), Friedrich Petran (U-516), Hanskurt von Bremen (U-764) and Günther Strauch (U-1010)	May 14	May 14	Surrendered in Loch Eriboll
Germany	U-1110	44-52?	Joachim-Walter Bach	May 14	May 14	Surrendered in List auf Sylt
Germany	U-1005	44-52?	Hermann Lauth	May 14	May 14	Surrendered in Bergen
Germany	U-2326	14-18?	Karl Jobst	May 14	May 14	Surrendered in Dundee
Germany	U-190	48?	Hans-Erwin Reith	May 14	May 14	Surrendered in the Bay of Bulls
Germany	U-858	48?	Thilo Bode	May 14	May 14	Surrendered in Lewes, Delaware
Germany	Army Group E	c. 13,000	Alexander Löhr	May 14	May 14	See Bleiburg repatriations
Germany	U-805	48?	Richard Bernardelli	May 15	May 15	Surrendered in Portsmouth, New Hampshire
Germany	U-901	48-56?	Hans Schrenk	May 15	May 15	Surrendered in Stavanger
Germany	U-2336	14-18?	Emil Klusmeier	May 15	May 15	Surrendered in Kiel
Germany/ Croatia/ Slovenia/ Montenegro	A large column in Poljana, Prevalje	29,650 (1,000? Germans, 15,250? Croatians, 11,400 Slovenes, and 2,000 Montenegrins)	N/A	May 15	May 15, at 4 PM	See Battle of Poljana
Germany	All forces on Alderney	3,202	Vice Admiral Friedrich Hüffmeier	May 16	May 16	
Germany	U-776	48-56?	Lothar Martin	May 16	May 16	Surrendered in Portland, United Kingdom
Germany	U-873	55-64?	Friedrich Steinhoff	May 16	May 16	Surrendered in Portsmouth, New Hampshire
Germany	U-255	44-60?	Helmut Heinrich	May 17	May 17	Surrendered in Loch Eriboll
Germany	U-1228	48?	Friedrich-Wilhelm Marienfeld	May 17	May 17	Surrendered in Portsmouth, New Hampshire
Croatia	Remnants of the 13th Waffen Mountain Division of the SS Handschar (1st Croatian), in Austria	see previous section on this division	N/A	May 18	May 18	
Germany	U-234	12	Johann-Heinrich Fehler	May 19	May 19	Surrendered in Portsmouth, New Hampshire
Georgia	Georgian Legion on Texel	226	None (their commander, Shalva Loladze, was killed on April 23)	May 20	May 20	see Georgian uprising on Texel for more details
Germany	All German forces on Texel	4,000	Klaus Breitner	May 20	May 20	Fighting against the Georgian Legion
Germany	A small company of soldiers on Minquiers reef	80?	N/A	May 23	May 23	
Croatia	Remnants of Croatian forces, in Odžak	c. 1,800?	N/A	May 25	May 25	Some soldiers became guerrillas and fought until spring 1947. Everyone else was KIA. See Battle of Odžak for more details
Germany	All forces on Schiermonnikoog	730	Thomas Wittko	June 11	June 11	The MS Waddenzee and MS Brakzand arrived and evacuated the Germans to Wilhelmshaven.
Germany	U-530	48?	Otto Wermuth	July 10	July 10	Surrendered at Mar del Plata
Germany	U-977	28-44?	Heinz Schäffer	August 17	August 17	Surrendered at Mar del Plata (16 left the ship)
Japan	All forces on Bougainville Island	21,335	Hitoshi Imamura	August 21	August 21	
Japan	All forces in Manchuria	1,950,479	Otozō Yamada	August 22	August 22	
Japan	All forces on Mili Atoll	c. 2,282	Navy Captain Masanori Shiga	August 22	August 22	
Japan	Air force personnel in central Bukidnon	4,000	Unknown	August 23	August 23	
Japan	All forces on Shumshu	8,244	Tsutsumi Fusaki	August 23	August 23	
Japan	All forces on Sakhalin	394,551	Lieutenant General Kiichiro Higuchi	August 25	August 25	
Japan	Personnel in the Infanta area of Southern Luzon	c, 1,500		August 30	August 30	
Japan	All forces on Marcus Island	c. 2,542	Unknown	August 31	August 31	
Japan	All forces on Bangka Island and Billiton Island	Unknown	Unknown	September 1	September 1	
Japan	All forces in Bataan	Unknown	Unknown	September 1	September 1	
Japan	All Japanese forces	2,354,946	Yoshijirō Umezu	September 2	September 2, at 12:00 AM	Formal surrender of all Japanese forces
Japan	All forces on Rota Island	2,665	Shigeo Iwagawa	September 2	September 2, at 1:00 AM	
Japan	All forces on Pagan	c. 2,494	Colonel Umehachi	September 2	September 2	
Japan	All forces in Penang	26,000	Jisaku Uozami	September 2	September 2	
Japan	All forces in Thailand	114,351	Lieutenant Colonel Hamada	September 2	September 2	
Japan	Forces in the southern Cagayan Valley, in the Philippines	Unknown	Colonel Matsui	September 2	September 2	
Japan	All forces on Truk Atoll	28,000	Shunzaburo Mugikura	September 3	September 3	
Japan	All forces in the Palau Islands	44,000	Lieutenant General Sadae Inoue	September 3	September 3	
Japan	All forces in the Bonin Islands	23,379	Lieutenant Yoshio Tachibana	September 3	September 3	
Japan	All forces in the Philippines	151,102	Tomoyuki Yamashita	September 3, at 12:10 PM	September 3	
Japan	Forces in Cebu	2,900	Unknown	September 4?	September 4?	
Japan	Forces in the Negros Occidental	1,400	Unknown	September 4?	September 4?	
Japan	Forces on Mindoro	7,000	Unknown	September 4?	September 4?	
Japan	All forces on Wake Island	c. 4,139	Rear Admiral Shigematsu Sakaibara	September 4	September 4	
Japan	All forces on Aguigan	c. 200	Second Lieutenant Kinichi Yamada	September 4	September 4	
Germany	Garrison on Bear Island	11	Lieutenant Wilhelm Dege	September 4	September 4	see Operation Haudegen for more details
Japan	All forces on Yap Island	c. 5,917	Colonel Daihachi Itoh	September 5	September 5	
Japan	All forces in the Kuril Islands	70,136	Tsutsumi Fusaki	September 5	September 5	
Japan	All forces on Jaluit Atoll	c. 2,311	Captain Nisuke Masuda	September 5	September 5	
Japan	All forces on Ulithi			September 5	September 5	
Japan	A small force in the Capisayan District of the Philippines	More than 2,300	Unknown	September 2	September 6	
Japan	All forces in the Bismarck Islands, Christmas Island, Wewak, the Solomon Islands and other Australian territories in the South Pacific	139,000 (41,384 in the Bismarck Islands (including 47,000 on New Britain), 29.059 in the Solomon Islands, 8,000 on Wewak and 13,557 in other Islands)	Hitoshi Imamura (Army), Admiral Jinichi Kusaka (Navy)	September 6, at 11:27 AM	September 6	Unknown number of soldiers in Christmas Island
Japan	All forces in the Ryukyu Islands	62,414	Lieutenant General Nomi Toshiro	September 7	September 7	
Japan	All forces on Kusaie	c. 4,511	Lieutenant General Yoshikazu Hirada	September 8	September 8	
Japan	The Japanese Northern Fleet			September 8	September 8	
Japan	All forces on Morotai and Halmahera	126,000	Heitarō Kimura	September 9	September 9	
Japan	All forces in China	1,541,973	Yasuji Okamura	Morning of September 9	September 9	
Japan	All forces in Korea south of the 38th parallel	420,796	Lieutenant General Yoshio Kozuki	September 9 (afternoon)	September 9	
Japan	All forces in Korea, north of the 38th parallel	595,418	Yoshio Kozuki	September 9	September 9	
Japan	All forces in Borneo and the Dutch East Indies east of Lombok	42,459 (in Borneo)	Lieutenant General Fusataro Teshima	September 8	September 9	
Japan	A Japanese force in China	c. 140,000	N/A	September	September	Joined the Chinese Red Army
Japan	All forces on Wotje Atoll and Maeolap Atoll	c. 2,162 (1,066 on Wotje, 1,096 on Maeolap)		September 10	September 10	
Japan	All forces in North Borneo	10,300	Lieutenant General Masao Baba	September 10	September 10	
Japan	All forces in Labuan	see forces in Sarawak	see forces in Sarawak	September 10	September 10	
Japan	All forces in New Guinea	37,658	Hatazō Adachi	September 11	September 11	
Japan	Thirty-Seventh Army, in Sarawak	c. 15,000	Lieutenant General Masao Baba	September 11	September 11	
Japan	All forces in Timor	3,235	Colonel Kaida Tatsuichi	September 11	September 11	
Japan	All forces on Ponape Island	c. 7,984	Lieutenant General Masao Watanabe	September 11	September 11	
Japan	All forces in Singapore and the Dutch East Indies	c. 585,000 (76,700 on Singapore, 65,540 on Java, 188,546 in the Malay Peninsula, and 254,214 on the other islands)	Hisaichi Terauchi	September 12	September 12	Formal ceremony for the forces in the Malay Peninsula took place on February 22, 1946.
Japan	All forces on Nauru	3,745	Captain Hisayuki Soeda	September 13	September 13	
Japan	All forces in Burma	71,733	Hisaichi Terauchi	September 13	September 13	
Japan	All forces in Hong Kong	19,222	General Takashi Sakai	September 16	September 16	
Japan	All forces on Lamotrek			September 16	September 16	
Japan	All forces on Namoluk			September 17	September 17	
Japan	All forces on Woleai	1,600		September 19	September 19	
Japan	38th Army in Indochina	106,184	Lieutenant General Yuitsu Tsuchihashi	September 28	September 28	
Japan	All forces in Miyako Island and on Ishigaki Island	32,000 (in the Miyako Islands)		September 29	September 29	
Japan	All forces on Ocean Island	c. 760	Lieutenant Nahoomi Suzuki	October 1	October 1	
Japan	All forces on Tobi, Sonsorol, and Merir	1,339 (439 on Tobi, 639 on Sonsoral and 269 on Merir)		October 6	October 6	
Japan	All forces in the Andaman and Nicobar Islands	c. 600?		October 7	October 7	
Japan	North China Area Army		Hiroshi Nemoto	October 10	October 10	
Japan	Third Air Fleet		None	October 15	October 15	
Japan	All forces on Puluwat	c. 1,253	Tatsuo Yasui	October 16	October 16	
Japan	All forces in Sumatra	68,764	Moritake Tanabe	October 21	October 21	
Japan	All forces in the Nomoi Islands	c. 1,010	Unknown	October 21	October 21	
Japan	All forces in Taiwan, the Paracel Islands, and the Spratly Islands	488,417 (in Taiwan)	Rikichi Andō	September 9 (In Taiwan)	October 25	
Japan	Military personnel on Lukunor			November	November	
Japan	Twelfth Air Fleet		None	November 30	November 30	
Japan	Captain Sakae Ōba Forces	46 men	Sakae Ōba	December 1		

=== Number of soldiers surrendering ===
Ethnicity/nationality	Approximate number of soldiers surrendered
Japanese	9,779,248
Germans	4,889,905
Italians	429,600
Russians	70,000 (including 50,000 Cossacks)
Foreign-born Germans (Volksdeutsche)	37,000
Croatians	33,050
Other foreigners in the SS	31,811
Hungarians	29,786
Galician Ukrainians	25,000
Latvians	19,500
Slovenes	11,400
Estonians	10,000
Dutch	6,956
Flemish	6,000
Various Soviet Union people	5,000
Indians	2,000
Montenegrins	2,000
Georgians	226
French	30
Total	15,388,513

== See also ==
- End of World War II in Asia
- End of World War II in Europe
- Japanese holdout
