= German submarine U-235 =

German World War II submarine

History

Nazi Germany
- Name: U-235
- Ordered: 20 January 1941
- Builder: Germaniawerft, Kiel
- Yard number: 665
- Laid down: 25 February 1942
- Launched: 4 November 1942
- Commissioned: 19 December 1942
- Fate: Sunk 14 April 1945

General characteristics
- Class & type: Type VIIC submarine
- Displacement: 769 tonnes (757 long tons) surfaced; 871 t (857 long tons) submerged
- Length: 67.10 m (220 ft 2 in) o/a; 50.50 m (165 ft 8 in) pressure hull
- Beam: 6.20 m (20 ft 4 in) o/a; 4.70 m (15 ft 5 in) pressure hull
- Height: 9.60 m (31 ft 6 in)
- Draught: 4.74 m (15 ft 7 in)
- Installed power: 2,800–3,200 PS (2,100–2,400 kW; 2,800–3,200 bhp) (diesels); 750 PS (550 kW; 740 shp) (electric)
- Propulsion: 2 shafts; 2 × diesel engines; 2 × electric motors
- Speed: 17.7 knots (32.8 km/h; 20.4 mph) surfaced; 7.6 knots (14.1 km/h; 8.7 mph) submerged
- Range: 8,500 nmi (15,700 km; 9,800 mi) at 10 knots (19 km/h; 12 mph) surfaced; 80 nmi (150 km; 92 mi) at 4 knots (7.4 km/h; 4.6 mph) submerged
- Test depth: 230 m (750 ft); Crush depth: 250–295 m (820–968 ft)
- Complement: 4 officers, 40–56 enlisted
- Armament: 5 × 53.3 cm (21 in) torpedo tubes (four bow, one stern); 14 × torpedoes or 26 TMA mines; 1 × 8.8 cm (3.46 in) deck gun (220 rounds); 1 x 2 cm (0.79 in) C/30 AA gun

Service record
- Part of: 5th U-boat Flotilla; 19 December 1942 – 20 May 1943; 22nd U-boat Flotilla; 29 October 1943 – 1 April 1945; 31st U-boat Flotilla; 2 – 14 April 1945
- Identification codes: M 49 124
- Commanders: Oblt.z.S. Goske von Möllendorf; 19 December 1942 – 19 January 1943; Oblt.z.S. Klaus-Helmuth Becker; 20 January – 20 May 1943; Oblt.z.S. Hans-Erich Kummetz; 29 October 1943 – 1 April 1945; Kptlt. Friedrich Huisgen; 2 – 14 April 1945
- Operations: None
- Victories: None

German submarine U-235 was a Type VIIC U-boat of Nazi Germany's Kriegsmarine during World War II.

== Design ==
German Type VIIC submarines were preceded by the shorter Type VIIB submarines. U-235 had a displacement of 769 tonnes (757 long tons) when at the surface and 871 tonnes (857 long tons) while submerged. She had a total length of 67.10 m (220 ft 2 in), a pressure hull length of 50.50 m (165 ft 8 in), a beam of 6.20 m (20 ft 4 in), a height of 9.60 m (31 ft 6 in), and a draught of 4.74 m (15 ft 7 in). The submarine was powered by two Germaniawerft F46 four-stroke, six-cylinder supercharged diesel engines producing a total of 2,800 to 3,200 metric horsepower (2,060 to 2,350 kW; 2,760 to 3,160 shp) for use while surfaced, two AEG GU 460/8–27 double-acting electric motors producing a total of 750 metric horsepower (550 kW; 740 shp) for use while submerged. She had two shafts and two 1.23 m (4 ft) propellers. The boat was capable of operating at depths of up to 230 metres (750 ft).

The submarine had a maximum surface speed of 17.7 knots (32.8 km/h; 20.4 mph) and a maximum submerged speed of 7.6 knots (14.1 km/h; 8.7 mph). When submerged, the boat could operate for 80 nautical miles (150 km; 92 mi) at 4 knots (7.4 km/h; 4.6 mph); when surfaced, she could travel 8,500 nautical miles (15,700 km; 9,800 mi) at 10 knots (19 km/h; 12 mph). U-235 was fitted with five 53.3 cm (21 in) torpedo tubes (four fitted at the bow and one at the stern), fourteen torpedoes, one 8.8 cm (3.46 in) SK C/35 naval gun, 220 rounds, and an anti-aircraft gun. The boat had a complement of between forty-four and sixty.

== Service history ==
The submarine was laid down on 25 February 1942 at the Friedrich Krupp Germaniawerft yard at Kiel as yard number 665, launched on 4 November and commissioned on 19 December under the command of Oberleutnant zur See Goske von Möllendorf.

After training with the 5th U-boat Flotilla at Kiel, U-235 was transferred to the 22nd flotilla on 29 October 1943, following her sinking in May by US bombs in Kiel. She had been raised, repaired and returned to service. She was reassigned to the 31st U-boat Flotilla on 2 April 1945, less than two weeks before her second sinking.

== Loss ==
On 14 April 1945, U-235 was heading to Norway with U-1272 when they encountered a small German convoy accompanied by the torpedo boat T17. All vessels had not been warned of the others' presence but the convoy had been warned that a British submarine was in the area. U-1272 dived deep and out of trouble, but U-235 surfaced, possibly to identify herself and then as if changing her mind, also dived. T17 attacked, dropping depth charges. Any celebration on T17 was abruptly stilled when amongst the wreckage appearing were bodies in Kriegsmarine uniform. Forty-six men died; there were no survivors.

== Bibliography ==
- Busch, Rainer; Röll, Hans-Joachim (1999). German U-boat commanders of World War II : a biographical dictionary. Translated by Brooks, Geoffrey. London, Annapolis, Md: Greenhill Books, Naval Institute Press. ISBN 1-55750-186-6.
- Busch, Rainer; Röll, Hans-Joachim (1999). Deutsche U-Boot-Verluste von September 1939 bis Mai 1945 [German U-boat losses from September 1939 to May 1945]. Der U-Boot-Krieg (in German). Vol. IV. Hamburg, Berlin, Bonn: Mittler. ISBN 3-8132-0514-2.
- Gröner, Erich; Jung, Dieter; Maass, Martin (1991). U-boats and Mine Warfare Vessels. German Warships 1815–1945. Vol. 2. Translated by Thomas, Keith; Magowan, Rachel. London: Conway Maritime Press. ISBN 0-85177-593-4.
- Kemp, Paul (1999). U-Boats Destroyed - German Submarine Losses in the World Wars. London: Arms & Armour. ISBN 1-85409-515-3.
