= German Instrument of Surrender =

1945 agreement ending WWII in Europe

Instrument of Surrender
The capitulation of the German state to the conditions provided by the Allies
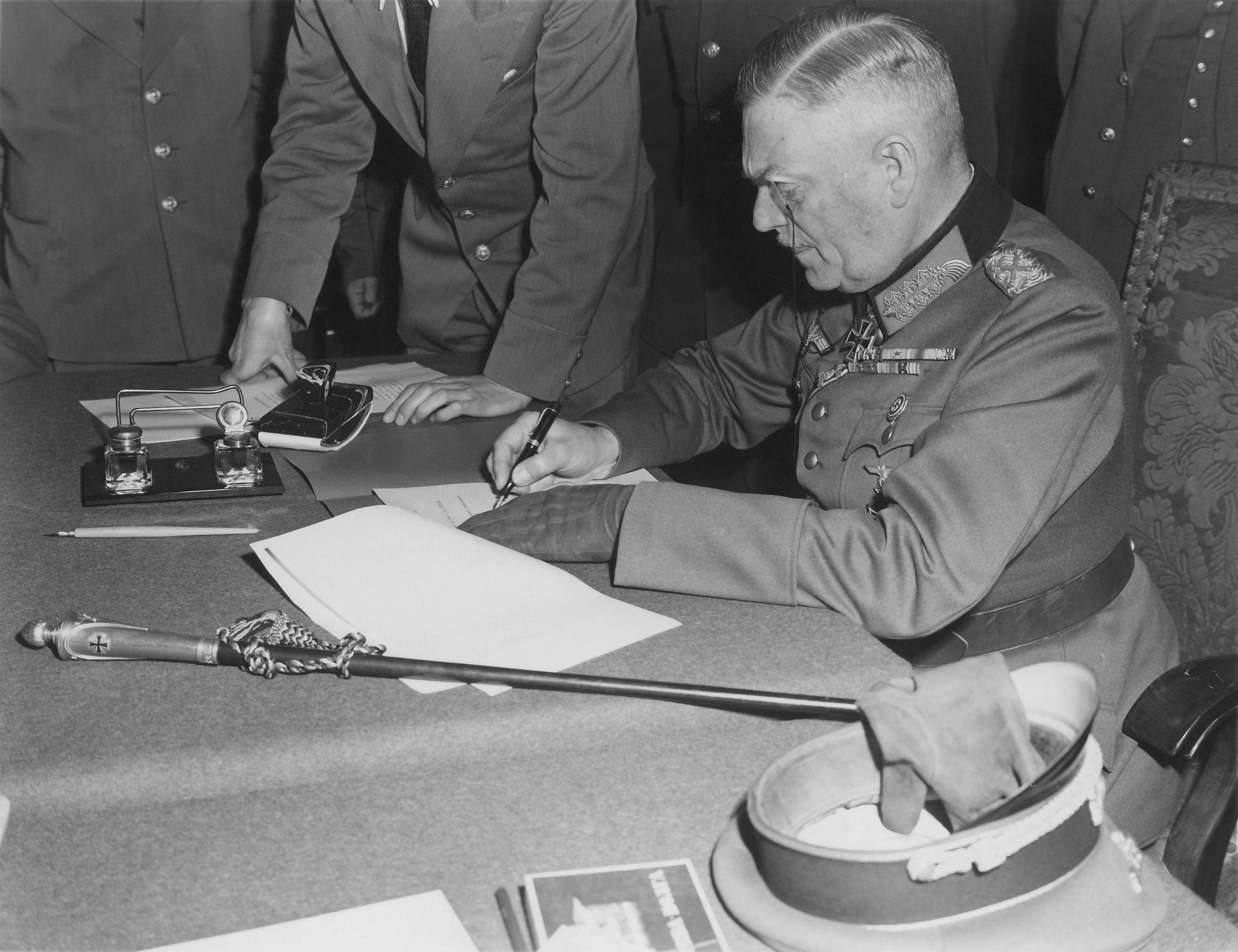
- Field-Marshal Wilhelm Keitel signing the unconditional surrender document, 8 May 1945
- Type: Capitulation
- Signed: 8 May 1945; 81 years ago
- Location: Berlin, Germany
- Condition: Signed
- Signatories: (Nazi Germany) Hans-Georg von Friedeburg (Nazi Germany) Wilhelm Keitel (Nazi Germany) Hans-Jürgen Stumpff (United Kingdom) Arthur Tedder (Soviet Union) Georgy Zhukov (Provisional Government of the French Republic) Jean de Lattre de Tassigny (witness) (United States) Carl Spaatz (witness)
- Parties: Germany; United Kingdom; Soviet Union; France; United States
- Ratifiers: German High Command; Soviet Union; United Kingdom; United States; France

Full text
- Definitive German Instrument of Surrender (8 May 1945) at Wikisource

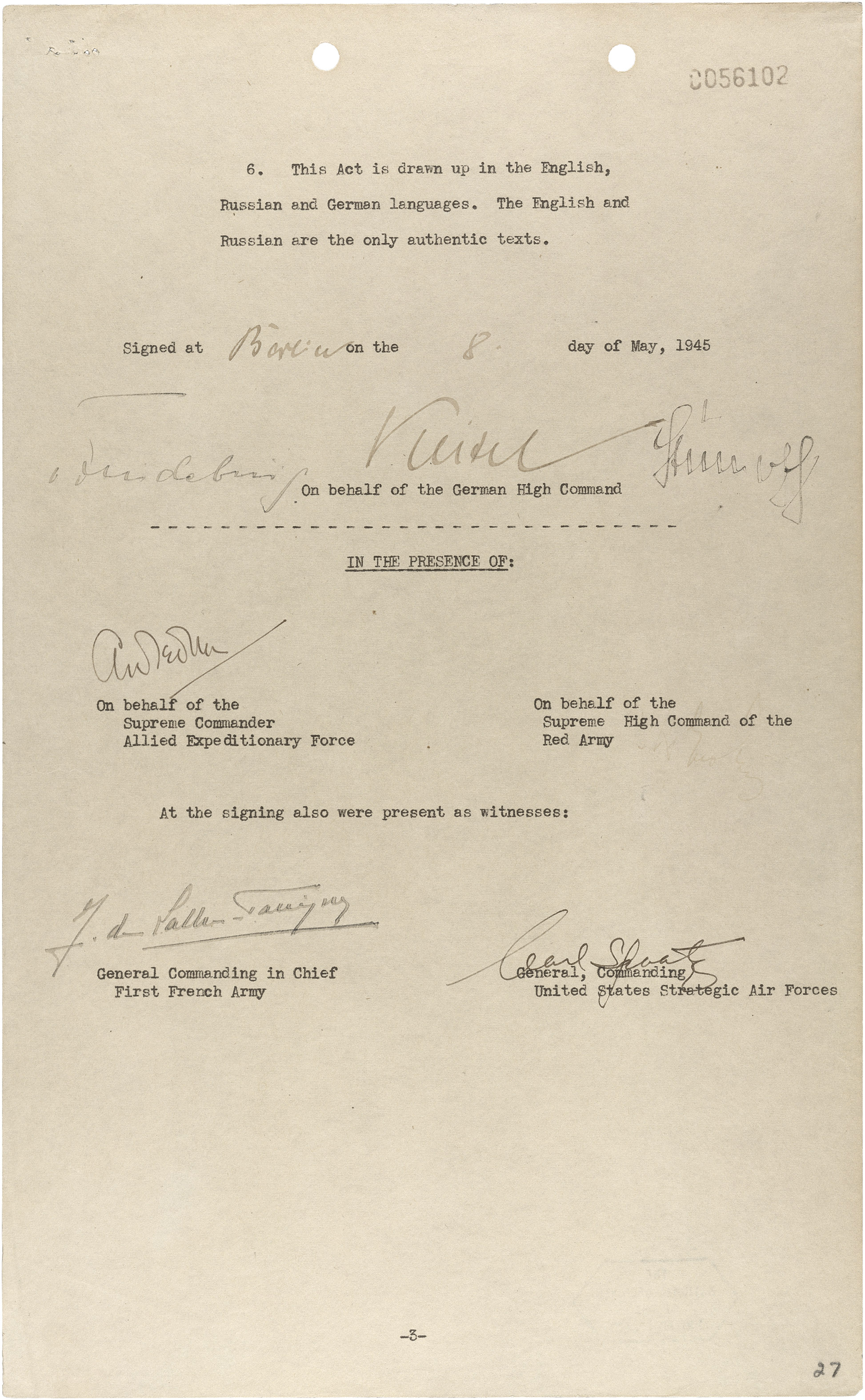
Third and last page of the German instrument of unconditional surrender signed in Berlin, Germany on 8 May 1945

The German Instrument of Surrender (Note: German: Bedingungslose Kapitulation der Wehrmacht, lit. 'Unconditional Capitulation of the "Wehrmacht"'; Russian: Акт о капитуляции Германии, romanized: Akt o kapitulyatsii Germanii, lit. 'Act of capitulation of Germany'; French: Actes de capitulation du Troisième Reich, lit. 'Acts of capitulation of the Third Reich') was a legal document effecting the unconditional surrender of the remaining German armed forces to the Allies, ending World War II in Europe. It was signed at 22:43 CET on 8 May 1945 (Note: The surrender document does not specify the exact time of signing. According to the official Soviet statement, the document was signed on 8 May at 22:43 CET (00:43, 9 May Moscow time). However, some sources indicate a later time of signing - around 1:00 a.m. on 9 May, CET.) and took effect at 23:01 CET on the same day.

The day before, Germany had signed another surrender document with the Allies in Reims in France, but it was not recognized by the Soviet Union, which demanded among other things that the act of surrender should take place at the seat of government of Nazi Germany from where German aggression had been initiated. Therefore, another document needed to be signed. In addition, immediately after signing the first document, the German forces were ordered to cease fire in the west and continue fighting in the east. Germany under the Flensburg Government led by the head of state, Grand-Admiral Karl Dönitz, also accepted the Allied suggestion to sign a new document.

The document was signed at the seat of the Soviet Military Administration in Germany (Karlshorst, Berlin) by representatives from the German Oberkommando der Wehrmacht (OKW), (Note: High command of the German armed forces.) the Allied Expeditionary Force represented by the British, and the Supreme High Command of the Soviet Red Army, with further French and American representatives signing as witnesses. This time, Field-Marshal Wilhelm Keitel was the highest ranking representative of Germany at the signing ceremony. This surrender document also led to the de facto fall of Nazi Germany. As one result of the German downfall, the Allies had de facto occupied Germany since the German defeat – which was later confirmed via the Berlin Declaration by the four countries of Allies as the common representative of new Germany (France, USSR, UK and the US), on 5 June 1945.

There were three versions of the surrender document – English, Russian, and German – with the English and Russian versions proclaimed in the document itself as the only authoritative ones.

== Background ==
On 30 April 1945, Adolf Hitler committed suicide inside his Führerbunker under the Reich Chancellery, after drawing up a testament in which Admiral Karl Dönitz succeeded him as next head of state of Germany, with the title of Reichspräsident, a vacant position dating back to the Weimar Republic. With the fall of Berlin two days later, and American and Soviet forces having linked up at Torgau on the Elbe, the area of Germany still under German military control was split in two. Moreover, the speed of the final Allied advances of March 1945, together with Hitler's insistent orders to stand and fight to the last, left the bulk of surviving German forces in isolated pockets and occupied territories mostly outside the boundaries of pre-Nazi Germany.

Dönitz attempted to form a government at Flensburg on the Danish border. He was joined there on 2 May 1945 by the Oberkommando der Wehrmacht (OKW, English: 'High Command of the Armed Forces') under Wilhelm Keitel, which had previously relocated to Krampnitz near Potsdam, and then to Rheinsberg during the Battle of Berlin. Dönitz sought to present his government as unpolitical. However, there was no repudiation of Nazism, the Nazi Party was not banned, leading Nazis were not detained, and the symbols of Nazism remained in place. Because of these shortcomings, neither the Soviets nor the Americans recognized Dönitz or the Flensburg Government as capable of representing the German state.

At Hitler's death, German armies remained in the Atlantic pockets of La Rochelle, St Nazaire, Lorient, Dunkirk and the Channel Islands; the Greek islands of Crete, Rhodes and the Dodecanese; most of Norway; Denmark; the northwestern Netherlands; northern Croatia; northern Italy; Austria; Bohemia and Moravia; the Courland peninsula in Latvia; the Hel Peninsula in Poland and in Germany towards Hamburg, facing British and Canadian forces; in Mecklenburg, Pomerania and the besieged city of Breslau, facing Soviet forces; and in southern Bavaria towards Berchtesgaden, facing American and French forces.

== Surrender document ==
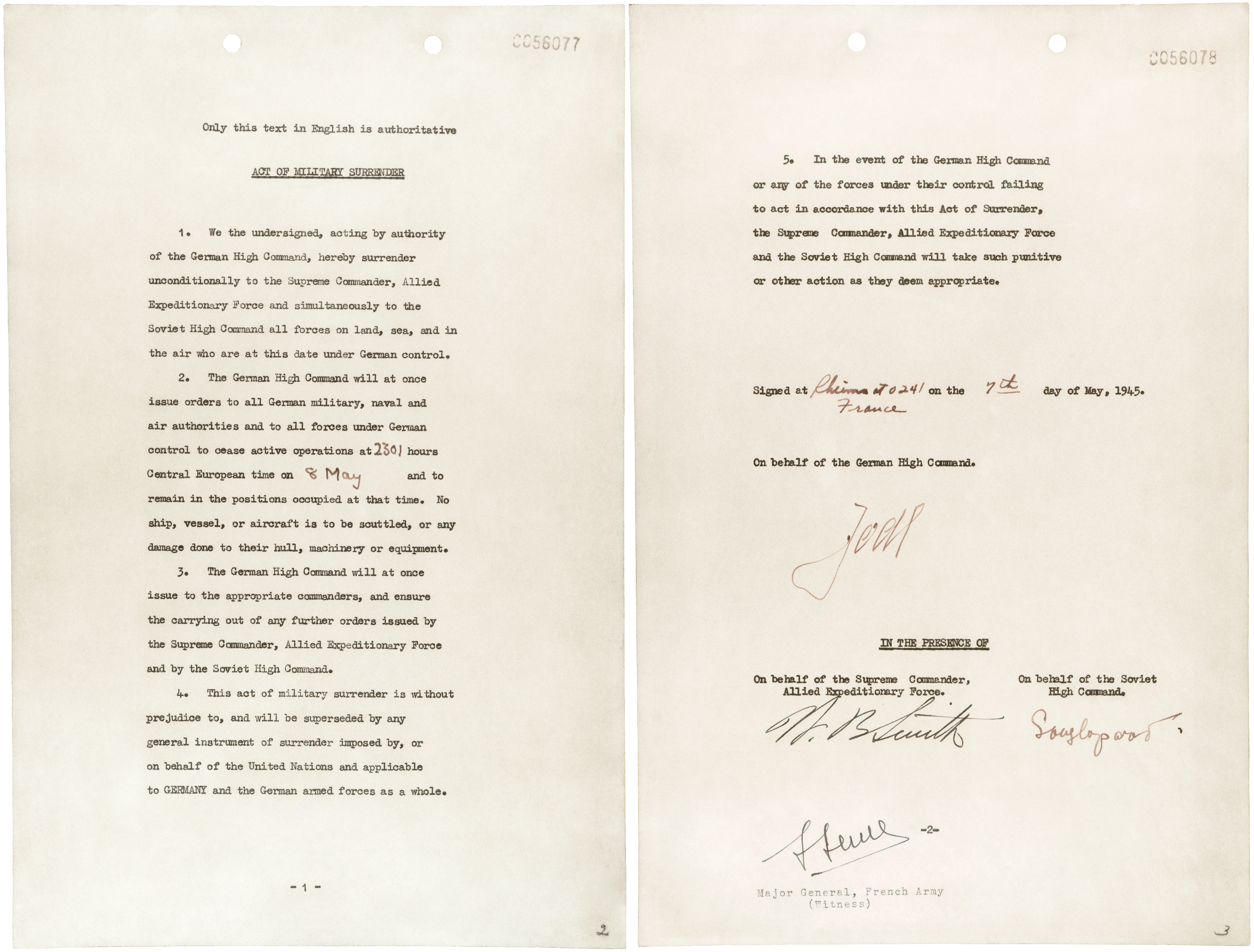
Instrument of Surrender document

Representatives of the Soviet Union, the United States, and the United Kingdom working through the European Advisory Commission (EAC) throughout 1944 sought to prepare an agreed surrender document to be used in the potential circumstances of Nazi power being overthrown within Germany either by military or civil authorities, and a post-Nazi government then seeking an armistice. By 3 January 1944, the Working Security Committee in the EAC proposed:

that the capitulation of Germany should be recorded in a single document of unconditional surrender.

The committee further suggested that the instrument of surrender be signed by representatives of the German High Command. The considerations behind this recommendation were to prevent the repetition of the so-called stab-in-the-back myth, where extremists in Germany claimed that since the Armistice of 11 November 1918 had been signed only by civilians, the High Command of the Army carried no responsibility for the instrument of defeat or for the defeat itself.

Not everyone agreed with the committee's predictions. Ambassador Sir William Strang, the British representative at the EAC, claimed:

It is impossible at present to foresee in what circumstances hostilities with Germany may be suspended. We cannot tell, therefore, what mode of procedure would be most suitable; whether, for example, it will be found best to have a full and detailed armistice; or a shorter armistice conferring general powers; or possibly no armistice at all, but a series of local capitulations by enemy commanders.

The surrender terms for Germany were initially discussed at the first EAC meeting on 14 January 1944. A definitive three-part text was agreed upon on 28 July 1944 and adopted by the three Allied Powers.

The first part consisted of a brief preamble: "The German Government and German High Command, recognizing and acknowledging the complete defeat of the German armed forces on land, at sea and in the air, hereby announce Germany's unconditional surrender".

The second part, articles 1–5, related to the military surrender by the German High Command of all forces on land, at sea, and in the air, to the surrender of their weapons, to their evacuation from any territory outside German boundaries as they stood on 31 December 1937, and to their liability to captivity as prisoners of war.

The third part, articles 6 to 12, related to the surrender by the German government to Allied representatives of almost all its powers and authority, the release and repatriation of prisoners and forced laborers, the cessation of radio broadcasts, the provision of intelligence and information, the maintenance of weapons and infrastructure, the yielding of Nazi leaders for war crimes trials, and the power of Allied Representatives to issue proclamations, orders, ordinances, and instructions covering "additional political, administrative, economic, financial, military and other requirements arising from the complete defeat of Germany". The key article in the third section was article 12, which provided that the German government and German High Command would comply fully with any proclamations, orders, ordinances, and instructions of the accredited Allied representatives. The Allies understood this as allowing unlimited scope to impose arrangements for the restitution and reparation of damages. Articles 13 and 14 specified the date of surrender and the languages of the definitive texts.

The Yalta Conference in February 1945 had led to further development of the terms of surrender, as it was agreed that the administration of post-war Germany would be split into four occupation zones for the Soviet Union, Britain, France, and the United States. It was also agreed at Yalta that an additional clause "12a," would be added to the July 1944 surrender text. It stated that the Allied representatives "will take such steps, including the complete disarmament, demilitarization and dismemberment of Germany as they deem requisite for future peace and security." The Provisional Government of the French Republic, however, was not a party to the Yalta agreement and refused to recognize it, which created a diplomatic problem as formal inclusion of the additional clause in the EAC text would inevitably create a French demand for equal representation in any dismemberment decisions. While this was unresolved, there were in effect two versions of the EAC text, one with the "dismemberment clause" and one without.

By the end of March 1945, the British government began to doubt whether, once Germany had been completely overpowered, there would be any post-Nazi German civil authority capable of signing the instrument of surrender or of putting its provisions into effect. They proposed that the EAC text should be redrafted as a unilateral declaration of German defeat by the Allied Powers, and of their assumption of supreme authority following the total dissolution of the German state. It was in this form that the text agreed by the EAC was finally effected as the Declaration Regarding the Defeat of Germany.

Meanwhile, the Combined Chiefs of Staff of the Western Allies agreed in August 1944 to general guidelines for the terms of local military surrenders to be concluded with any capitulating German forces. They mandated that capitulation had to be unconditional and restricted to the purely military aspects of a local surrender and that no commitments were to be given to the enemy. That surrender was to be without prejudice to any subsequent general instrument of surrender which might replace any document of partial surrender and which would be jointly imposed on Germany by the three primary Allied Powers. These guidelines formed the basis for the series of partial capitulations of German forces to the Western Allies in April and May 1945.

As the German surrender happened, the EAC text was substituted by a simplified, military-only version based on the wording of the partial surrender instrument of German forces in Italy signed at the surrender of Caserta. The reasons for the change are disputed but may have reflected awareness of the reservations being expressed as to the capability of the German signatories to agree the provisions of the full text or the continued uncertainty over communicating the "dismemberment clause" to the French.

== Instruments of partial surrender ==
=== German forces in Italy and Western Austria ===
German military commanders in Italy had been conducting secret negotiations for a partial surrender; which was signed at Caserta on 29 April 1945, to come into effect on 2 May. Field Marshal Albert Kesselring, with overall military command for OKW-South, initially denounced the capitulation; but once Hitler's death had been confirmed, acceded to it.

=== German forces in Northwest Germany, Netherlands, Denmark, and Schleswig-Holstein ===
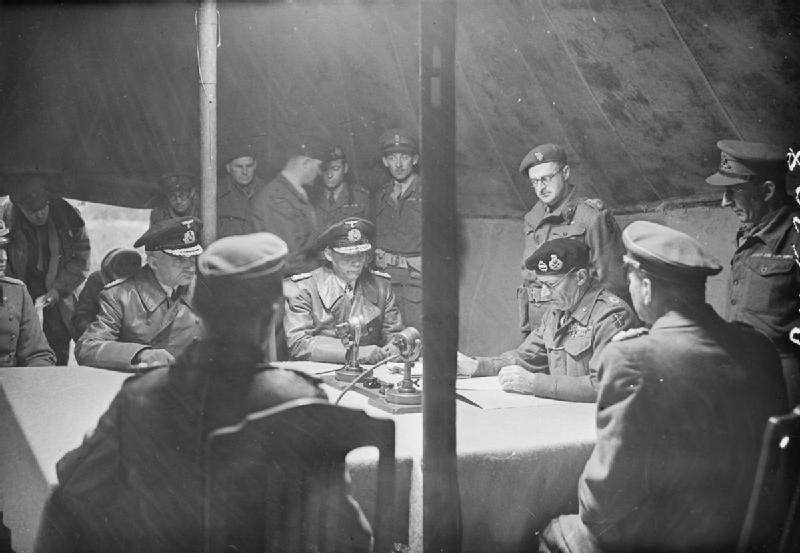
Field Marshal Sir Bernard Montgomery (seated second from the right) signs the terms of the surrender watched by Rear Admiral Wagner and Admiral von Friedeburg on 4 May 1945.

On 4 May 1945, German forces acting under instruction from the Dönitz Government and facing the British and Canadian 21st Army Group, signed an act of surrender at Lüneburg Heath to come into effect on 5 May.

=== German forces in Southern Germany ===
On 5 May 1945, all German forces in Bavaria and Southwest Germany signed an act of surrender to the Americans at Haar, outside Munich; coming into effect on 6 May.

The impetus for the Caserta capitulation had arisen from within the local German military command; but from 2 May 1945, the Dönitz government assumed control of the process, pursuing a deliberate policy of successive partial capitulations in the west to play for time in order to bring as many as possible of the eastern military formations westwards so as to save them from Soviet or Yugoslav captivity, and surrender them intact to the British and Americans. In addition, Dönitz hoped to continue to evacuate soldiers and civilians by sea from the Hela peninsula and the surrounding Baltic coastal areas. Dönitz and Keitel were resolved against issuing any orders to surrender to Soviet forces, not only from undiminished anti-Bolshevism, but also because they could not be confident they would be obeyed, and might consequently place troops continuing to fight in the position of refusing a direct order, thereby stripping them of any legal protection as prisoners of war.

These surrenders in the west had succeeded in ceasing hostilities between the Western allies and German forces on almost all fronts. At the same time however, the broadcast orders of the Dönitz government continued to oppose any acts of German surrender to Soviet forces in Courland, Bohemia and Mecklenburg; indeed attempting to countermand ongoing surrender negotiations both in Berlin and Breslau. German forces in the east were ordered instead to fight their way westwards. Conscious that, if this were to continue, the Soviet Command would suspect that the Western allies were intending a separate peace (as indeed was exactly Dönitz's intention), Eisenhower determined that no further partial surrenders would be agreed in the West; but instead instructed the Dönitz government to send representatives to Supreme Headquarters Allied Expeditionary Force (SHAEF) headquarters in Reims, to agree terms for a general surrender of all German forces simultaneously to all the Allied powers, including the Soviets.

Following these surrenders, the major remaining German forces in the field consisted of Army Group E facing Yugoslav forces in Croatia, the remains of Army Group Vistula facing Soviet forces in Mecklenburg, and Army Group Centre facing Soviet forces in eastern Bohemia and Moravia, engaging in the brutal suppression of the Prague uprising. An occupying army of around 400,000 well-equipped German troops remained in Norway, under the command of General Franz Böhme, who was contacted by the German Minister in Sweden early on 6 May, to determine whether a further partial capitulation might be arranged for his forces with neutral Sweden acting as an intermediary, but was unwilling to comply with anything other than a general surrender order from the German High Command i.e. OKW.

After these partial surrenders (and the signing in Reims) Germany signed its final document to surrender to the Allied side in Berlin.

== Surrender ceremony ==
=== Preliminary surrender document in Reims ===
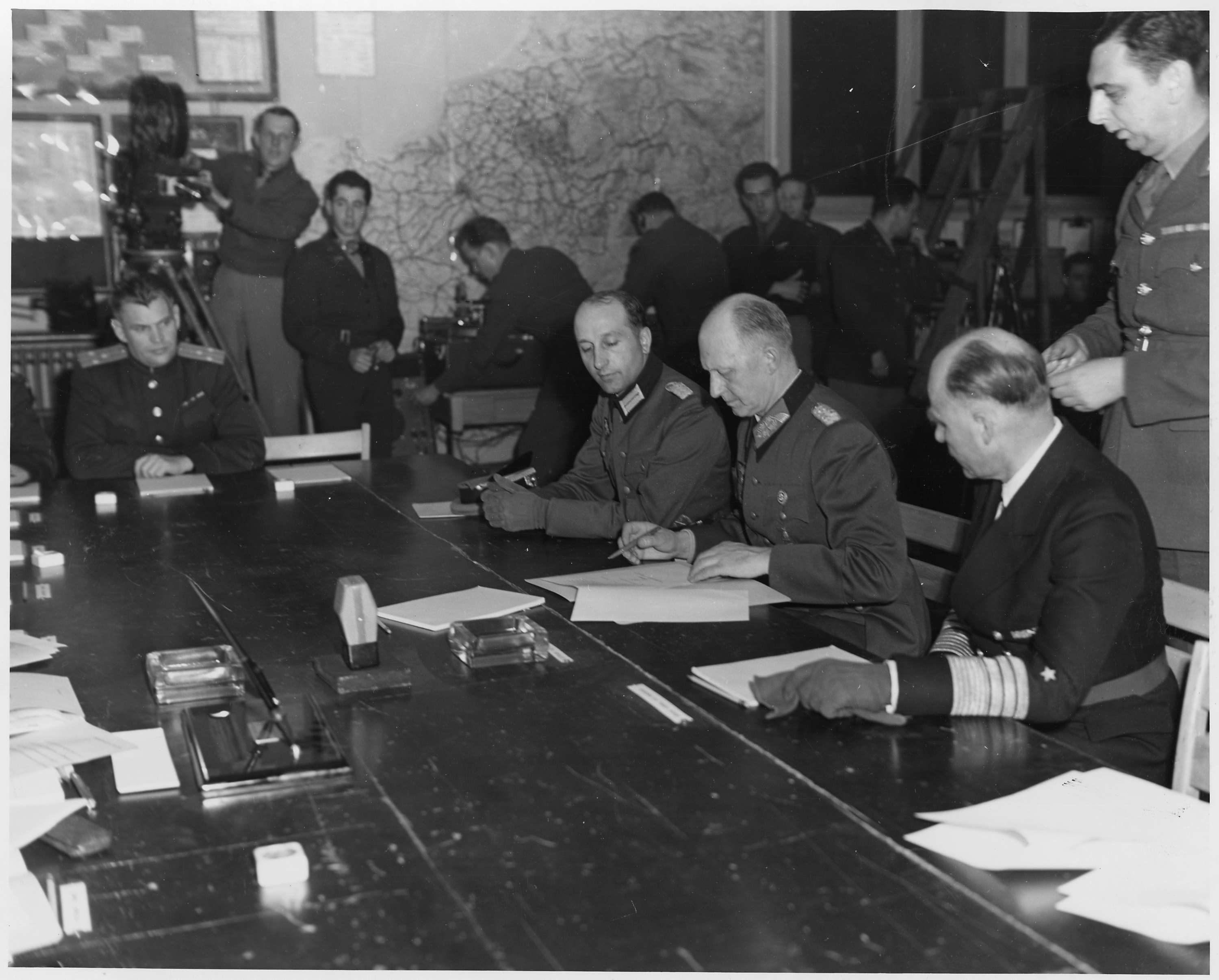
General Alfred Jodl signing the capitulation papers of unconditional surrender in Reims, France

Dönitz's representative, Admiral Hans-Georg von Friedeburg, informed him on 6 May that Eisenhower was now insisting on "immediate, simultaneous and unconditional surrender on all fronts." General Alfred Jodl was sent to Reims to attempt to persuade Eisenhower otherwise, but Eisenhower short-circuited any discussion by announcing at 9:00 pm on the 6th that, in the absence of a complete capitulation, he would close British and American lines to surrendering German forces at midnight on 8 May and resume the bombing offensive against remaining German-held positions and towns. Jodl telegraphed this message to Dönitz, who responded, authorizing him to sign the instrument of unconditional surrender, but subject to negotiating a 48-hour delay, ostensibly to enable the surrender order to be communicated to outlying German military units.

Consequently, the first Instrument of Surrender was signed in Reims at 02:41 Central European Time (CET) on 7 May 1945. The signing took place in a red brick schoolhouse, the Collège Moderne et Technique de Reims, that served as the SHAEF headquarters. It is now the Surrender Museum. It was to take effect at 23:01 CET (one minute after 11:00 pm, British Double Summer Time) on 8 May, the 48-hour grace period having been back-dated to the start of final negotiations.

The unconditional surrender of the German armed forces was signed by Jodl, on behalf of the OKW. General Walter Bedell Smith signed on behalf of the Supreme Commander of the Allied Expeditionary Force and General Ivan Susloparov on behalf of the Soviet High Command. French Major-General François Sevez signed as the official witness.

Eisenhower had proceeded throughout in consultation with General Aleksei Antonov of the Soviet High Command; and at his request, General Susloparov had been seconded to the SHAEF Headquarters to represent the Soviet High Command in the surrender negotiations. The text of the act of surrender had been telegraphed to General Antonov in the early hours of 7 May, but no confirmation of Soviet approval had been received by the time of the surrender ceremony, nor was there confirmation that General Susloparov was empowered to sign as representing the Soviet High Command. Accordingly, Eisenhower agreed with Susloparov that a separate text should be signed by the German emissaries; undertaking that fully empowered representatives of each of the German armed services would attend a formal ratification of the act of surrender at a time and place designated by the Allied High Commands.

==== Text of the preliminary instrument of surrender ====
UNDERTAKING GIVEN BY CERTAIN GERMAN EMISSARIES TO THE ALLIED HIGH COMMANDS

It is agreed by the German emissaries undersigned that the following German officers will arrive at a place and time designated by the Supreme Commander, Allied Expeditionary Force, and the Soviet High Command prepared, with plenary powers, to execute a formal ratification on behalf of the German High Command of this act of Unconditional Surrender of the German armed forces.

Chief of the High Command; Commander-in-Chief of the Army; Commander-in-Chief of the Navy; Commander-in-Chief of the Air Forces.

SIGNED

JODL

Representing the German High Command. DATED 0241 7 May 1945 Rheims, France

=== Definitive surrender document in Berlin ===
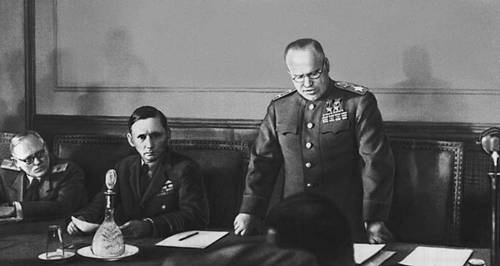
Marshal Georgy Zhukov reading the German capitulation in Berlin. Seated on his right is Air Chief Marshal Sir Arthur Tedder.

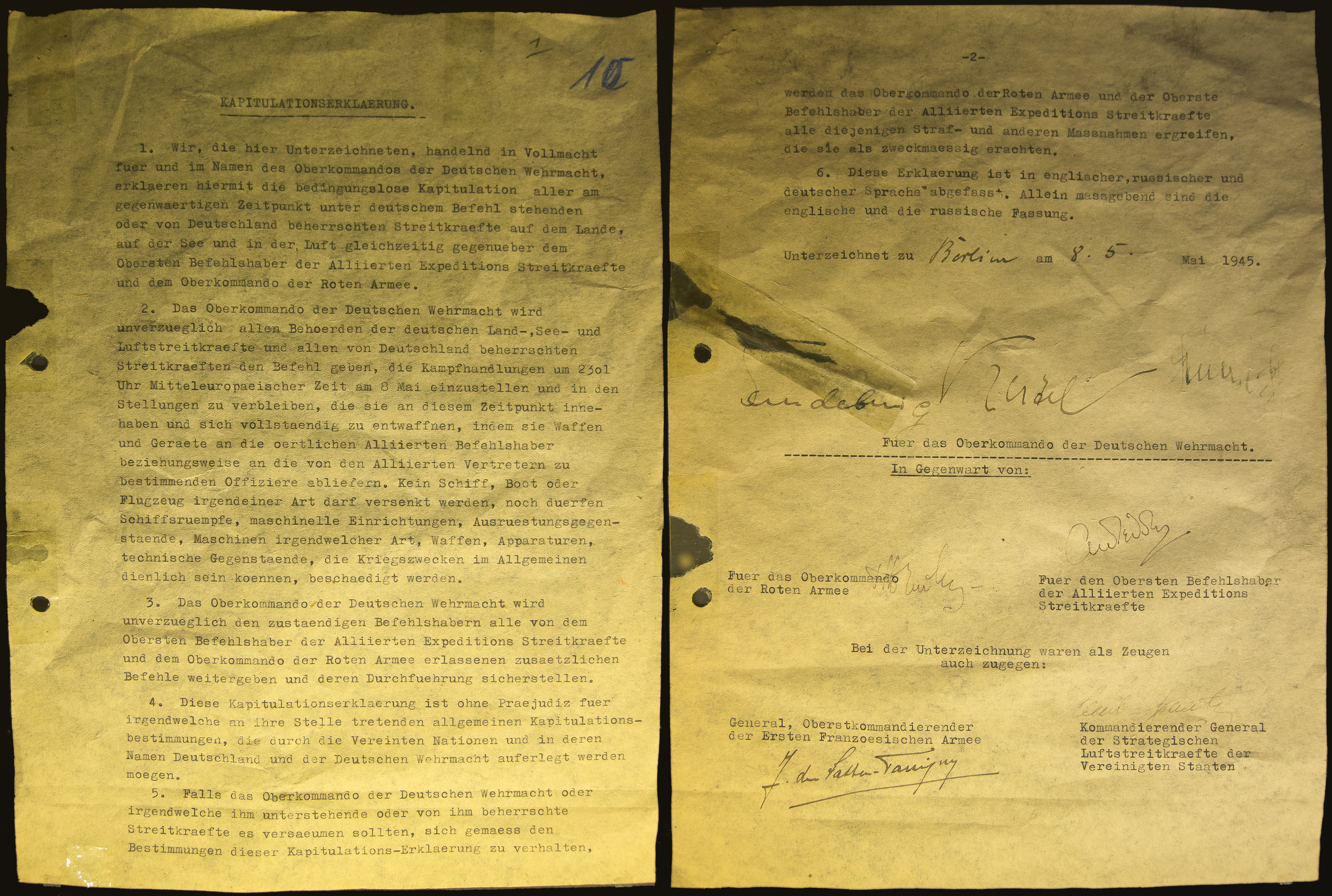
German Instrument of Surrender, 8 May 1945 (displayed at the Museum Berlin-Karlshorst)

Some six hours after the Reims signing, a response was received from the Soviet High Command stating that the Act of Surrender was unacceptable, both because the text differed from that agreed by the EAC, and because Susloparov had not been empowered to sign. These objections were, however, pretexts; the substantive Soviet objection was that the act of surrender ought to be a unique, singular, historical event fully reflecting the leading contribution of the Soviet people to the final victory. They maintained that it should not be held on liberated territory that had been victimized by German aggression, but at the seat of government from where that German aggression sprang: Berlin. Furthermore, the Soviets pointed out that, although the terms of the surrender signed in Reims required German forces to cease all military activities and remain in their current positions; they were not explicitly required to lay down their arms and give themselves up, "what has to happen here is the surrender of German troops, giving themselves up as prisoners". Eisenhower immediately agreed, acknowledging that the act of surrender signed in Reims should be considered "a brief instrument of unconditional military surrender", and undertook to attend with correctly accredited representatives of the German High Command for a "more formal signing" of a suitably amended text presided over by Marshal Georgy Zhukov in Berlin (capital of Nazi Germany) on 8 May. Furthermore, he issued a clarificatory statement that any German forces continuing to fight against the Soviets after the stated deadline would "no longer have the status of soldiers"; and hence, if they were to surrender to the Americans or British, would then be handed back into Soviet captivity.

The effect of the Reims signing was limited to a consolidation of the effective ceasefire between German forces and the Western Allies. Fighting continued unabated in the east however, especially as German forces now intensified their air and ground assault against the Prague uprising, while the seaborne evacuation of German troops across the Baltic continued. Dönitz issued new commands that resistance to Soviet forces should be maintained, taking advantage of the 48-hour grace period to order redoubled efforts to save German military units from Soviet captivity; and it soon became clear that he had authorized the signing of a general surrender at Reims in bad faith, and that consequently neither the Soviet Command nor the German forces would accept the Reims surrender as effecting an end to hostilities between them. General Ferdinand Schörner commanding Army Group Centre, broadcast a message to his troops on 8 May 1945 denouncing "false rumors" that the OKW had surrendered to the Soviet Command as well as the Western Allies; "The struggle in the west however is over. But there can be no question of surrender to the Bolsheviks."

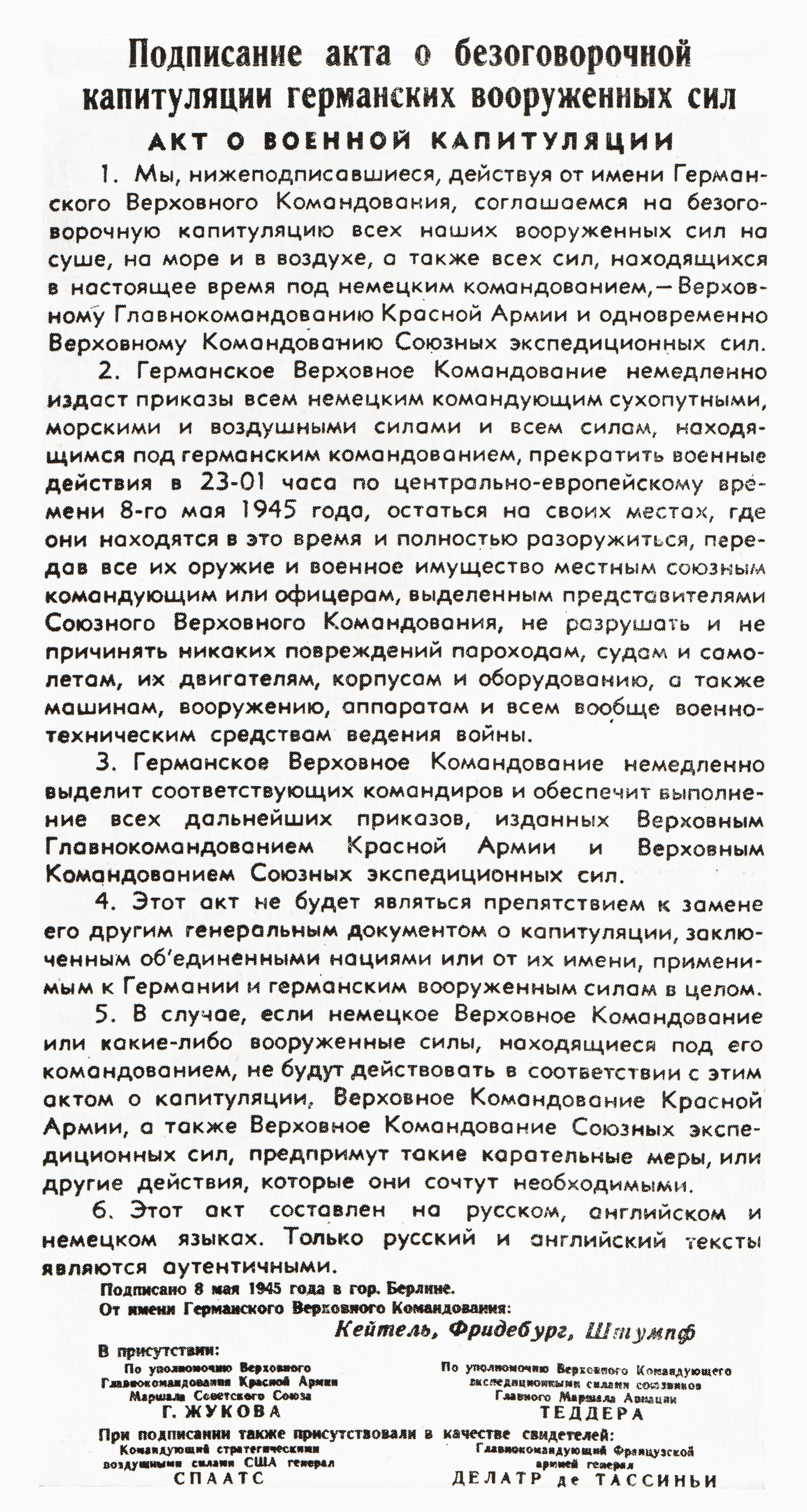
German Instrument of Surrender in Soviet newspaper Pravda, 9 May 1945

Consequently, Eisenhower arranged for the commanders in chief of each of the three German armed services to be flown from Flensburg to Berlin early on 8 May; where they were kept waiting through the day until 10:00 pm when the Allied delegation arrived, at which point the amended surrender text was provided to them. The definitive Act of Military Surrender was dated as being signed before midnight on 8 May at the seat of the Soviet Military Administration in Berlin-Karlshorst, now the location of the Museum Berlin-Karlshorst. Since Eisenhower as Supreme Allied Commander for Western Europe technically outranked Zhukov, the act of signing on behalf of the Western Allies passed to his deputy, Air Chief Marshal Arthur Tedder. The proposed Soviet amendments to the Reims surrender text were accepted without difficulty by the Western Allies; but the identification and designation of the Allied signatories proved more problematic. French forces operated under SHAEF command, but General de Gaulle was demanding that General de Tassigny sign separately for the French High Command; but in that case it would be politically unacceptable for there to be no American signature on the definitive surrender document, while the Soviets would not agree to there being more than three Allied signatories in total – one of whom would have to be Zhukov. After repeated redrafts, all of which needed translating and retyping, it was finally agreed that both French and American signatures would be as witnesses. But the consequence was that the final versions were not ready for signing until after midnight. Consequently, the physical signing was delayed until nearly 01:00 am on 9 May, Central European Time; and then back-dated to 8 May to be consistent with the Reims agreement and the public announcements of the surrender already made by Western leaders. However, the official Soviet declaration stated that the signing took place at 22:43 CET on 8 May, meaning that the signing still took place before the German surrender took effect.

The definitive Act of Military Surrender differed from the Reims signing principally in respect of requiring three German signatories, who could fully represent all three armed services together with the German High Command. Otherwise the amended text set out an expanded article 2, now requiring German forces to disarm and hand over their weapons to local allied commanders. This clause had the effect of ensuring that German military forces would not only cease military operations against regular allied forces; but would also disarm themselves, disband, and be taken into captivity. Field Marshal Keitel initially balked at the amended text, proposing that an additional grace period of 12 hours be granted to surrendering German forces, before they might be exposed to punitive action for non-compliance under article 5. In the event, he had to be satisfied with a verbal assurance from Zhukov.

Admiral Friedeburg was the only representative of the German forces to be present at the signing of the German instruments of surrender at Luneburg Heath on 4 May 1945, in Reims on 7 May and in Berlin on 8 May 1945.

==== Text of the definitive instrument of surrender ====
ACT OF MILITARY SURRENDER

1. We the undersigned, acting by authority of the German High Command, hereby surrender unconditionally to the Supreme Commander, Allied Expeditionary Force and simultaneously to the Supreme High Command of the Red Army all forces on land, at sea, and in the air who are at this date under German control.
2. The German High Command will at once issue orders to all German military, naval and air authorities and to all forces under German control to cease active operations at 23:01 hours Central European time on 8 May 1945, to remain in all positions occupied at that time and to disarm completely, handing over their weapons and equipment to the local allied commanders or officers designated by Representatives of the Allied Supreme Commands. No ship, vessel, or aircraft is to be scuttled, or any damage done to their hull, machinery or equipment, and also to machines of all kinds, armament, apparatus, and all the technical means of prosecution of war in general.
3. The German High Command will at once issue to the appropriate commanders, and ensure the carrying out of any further orders issued by the Supreme Commander, Allied Expeditionary Force and by the Supreme Command of the Red Army.
4. This act of military surrender is without prejudice to, and will be superseded by any general instrument of surrender imposed by, or on behalf of the United Nations and applicable to GERMANY and the German armed forces as a whole.
5. In the event of the German High Command or any of the forces under their control failing to act in accordance with this Act of Surrender, the Supreme Commander, Allied Expeditionary Force and the Supreme High Command of the Red Army will take such punitive or other action as they deem appropriate.
6. This Act is drawn up in the English, Russian and German languages. The English and Russian are the only authentic texts.

Representatives:

- Soviet Union: Marshal Georgy Zhukov: on behalf of the Supreme High Command of the Red Army
- United Kingdom: Air Chief Marshal Sir Arthur William Tedder, as Deputy Supreme Commander of the Allied Expeditionary Force
- United States: General Carl Spaatz, Commanding United States Strategic Air Forces, as witness
- France: General Jean de Lattre de Tassigny, Commanding First French Army, as witness
- Germany:
  - Field Marshal Wilhelm Keitel as the Chief of the General Staff of the German Armed Forces (Wehrmacht) and as representative of the German Army
  - General-Admiral Hans-Georg von Friedeburg as Commander-in-Chief of the German Navy
  - Colonel-General Hans-Jürgen Stumpff as the representative of the German Air Force

=== Effects of the surrender ===
Newsreel about the Allied liberation of Norway from Nazi German forces after 8 May 1945

For the most part, the Berlin signing did the job required of it; with German forces in Courland and the Atlantic outposts all surrendering on 9 May within the informal 12-hour grace period. German surrender to the Soviets in Bohemia and Moravia took rather longer to achieve, with some German forces in Bohemia continuing to attempt to fight their way towards the American lines.

Nevertheless, the principle of a common surrender broadly held; and units seeking to defy it were denied passage west, perforce having to surrender to the Soviets. The exception was Army Group E in Croatia, which fought on for several days attempting to force an escape from the partisan forces of Marshal Tito, such that many soldiers from these units did succeed in surrendering to General Alexander in Italy. These included considerable numbers of Ustase collaboration troops, who were subsequently returned to Yugoslavia; and who were all promptly executed without trial.

=== Timeline of the surrender ===
| Events | GMT-4; Eastern U.S. Time (Eastern War Time) | GMT; Universal time | GMT+1; Time in Ireland (Summer Time); CET | GMT+2; Time observed in Western Europe (Germany, France, Great Britain); BDST during the war CEST (Summer Time) | GMT+3; Time in Eastern Europe (Ukraine, Russia) |
| Signing of the capitulation in Reims | 8:41 pm Sunday 6 May | 00:41; Monday 7 May | | 02:41; Monday 7 May | 03:41; Monday 7 May |
| End of the war announced by Truman, Churchill, de Gaulle | 9:15am Tuesday 8 May | 13:15; Tuesday 8 May | | 15:15; Tuesday 8 May | |
| New signing of the capitulation in Berlin | 5:43pm Tuesday 8 May | 21:43; Tuesday 8 May | 22:43; Tuesday 8 May | 23:43; Tuesday 8 May | 00:43; Wednesday 9 May |
| Moment of the ceasefire as agreed in Reims | 6:01pm Tuesday 8 May | 22:01; Tuesday 8 May | 23:01; Tuesday 8 May | 00:01; Wednesday 9 May | 01:01; Wednesday 9 May |

== "VE Day" and "Victory Day" ==
The Reims signing ceremony had been attended by considerable numbers of reporters, all of whom were bound by a 36-hour embargo against reporting the capitulation. As it became clear that there would need to be a definitive second signing before the Act of Surrender could become operative, Eisenhower agreed that the news blackout should remain; however, the American journalist Edward Kennedy of the Associated Press news agency in Paris broke the embargo on 7 May, with the consequence that the German surrender was headline news in the western media on 8 May. Realizing that it had become politically impossible to keep to the original timetable, it was eventually agreed that the Western Allies would celebrate "Victory in Europe Day" on 8 May, but that western leaders would not make their formal proclamations of Victory until that evening (when the Berlin signing ceremony should be imminent). The Soviet government made no public acknowledgement of the Reims signing, which they did not recognize; Soviet Union celebrated "Victory Day" on 9 May 1945 because this document was signed when time was 9 May in Soviet Union. Today, both 8 May and 9 May are considered the end of World War II in Europe to celebrate due to the time zone difference.

== Declaration regarding the defeat of Germany ==
Although the German military signatories of the German Instrument of Surrender had been officially acting under instructions from Admiral Dönitz, none of the Allied Governments recognized the acting Flensburg Government as validly exercising civil power, and consequently the Allies had insisted that the German signatories should explicitly represent the German High Command alone. On 23 May 1945, in Flensburg, a group of former Nazi members, including Karl Dönitz, were taken into captivity as prisoners of war, and Admiral Friedeburg committed suicide. Pursuant to Article 4 of the Instrument of Surrender, the Berlin Declaration on 5 June 1945 confirmed the Nazi defeat and Nazi de facto fall as well as established the Allied occupation of Germany.

=== Diplomatic relations and embassies ===
During 1944 and 1945, formerly neutral countries and former German allies had been joining the Allies and declaring war on Germany. The German embassies to the countries had been closed down, with their property and archives held in trust by a nominated protecting power (usually Switzerland or Sweden) under the terms of the Geneva Conventions; with counterpart arrangements for the former embassies of Allied countries in Berlin. The United States State Department had prepared for the diplomatic consequences of the war's ending on the assumption that there would have been an explicit statement of unconditional surrender of the German state in accordance with the agreed EAC surrender text. In the final days of April 1945, the State Department had notified the protecting powers, and all other remaining neutral governments (such as Ireland), that following the forthcoming German surrender, the continued identity of the German state would rest solely in the four Allied Powers, who would immediately recall all German diplomatic staff, take ownership of all German state property, extinguish all protecting power functions, and require the transfer of all archives and records to one or another of the embassies of the western Allies. On 8 May 1945, these arrangements were put into effect in full, notwithstanding that the only German parties to the signed surrender document had been the German High Command ("Oberkommando der Wehrmacht"-OKW); the western Allies maintaining that a functioning German state had already ceased to exist, and consequently that the surrender of the German military had effected the complete termination of Nazi Germany. As the protecting powers complied fully with the Allied demands, the German state ceased as a diplomatic entity on 8 May 1945 until the establishment of West Germany on 23 May 1949. In other words, the fall of German Reich (1871-1945) that included Nazi Germany leads to the fact that Germany de facto lost its own government to become a region occupied by the foreigners at the time. The Empire of Japan, a remaining Axis belligerent, had already denounced the German decision about the surrender and unilaterally seized all German properties in Japan.

=== Berlin Declaration (5 June 1945) ===
Nevertheless, as the surrender instrument of 8 May 1945 had been signed only by German military representatives, the full civil provisions for the unconditional surrender of Germany remained without explicit formal basis. Consequently, the EAC text for Unconditional Surrender of Germany, redrafted as a declaration and with an extended explanatory preamble, was adopted unilaterally by the now four Allied Powers as the Declaration regarding the defeat of Germany. This spelled out the Allied position that as a result of its complete defeat Germany had no government or central authority (the Allies did not recognize the rump Nazi Flensburg Government) and that the vacated civil authority in Germany had consequently been assumed solely by the four Allied Representative Powers (Union of Soviet Socialist Republics, United States of America, United Kingdom of Great Britain and Northern Ireland, and French Republic) on behalf of the Allied Governments overall, an authority subsequently constituted into the Allied Control Council (ACC). Stalin had, however, already backtracked on his previous support for the principle of German dismemberment, publicly renouncing any such policy in his victory proclamation to the Soviet people of 8 May 1945. Consequently, there was no "dismemberment clause" in the Berlin declaration text.

== See also ==
- Timeline of the surrender of Axis forces at the end of World War II
- Armistice of Cassibile
- Armistice of Malta
- Debellatio
- Japanese Instrument of Surrender
- Morgenthau Plan
- Nuremberg trials
- Paris Peace Treaties, 1947; formally established peace between the World War II Allies and the nations of Bulgaria, Hungary, Italy, Romania, and Finland
- Treaty on the Final Settlement with Respect to Germany
