= Naxos =

Greek island in the Aegean Sea

Native name: Νάξος
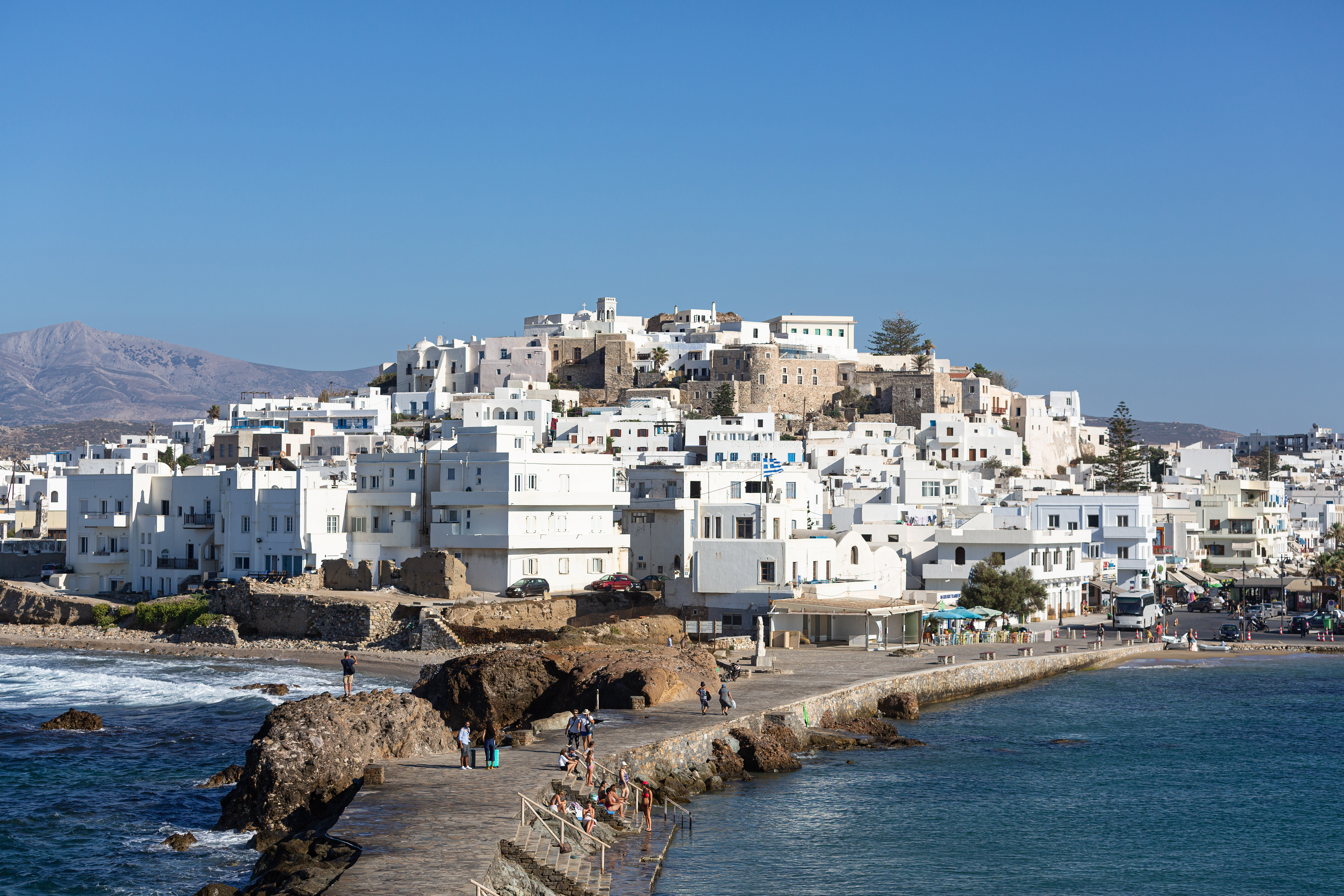
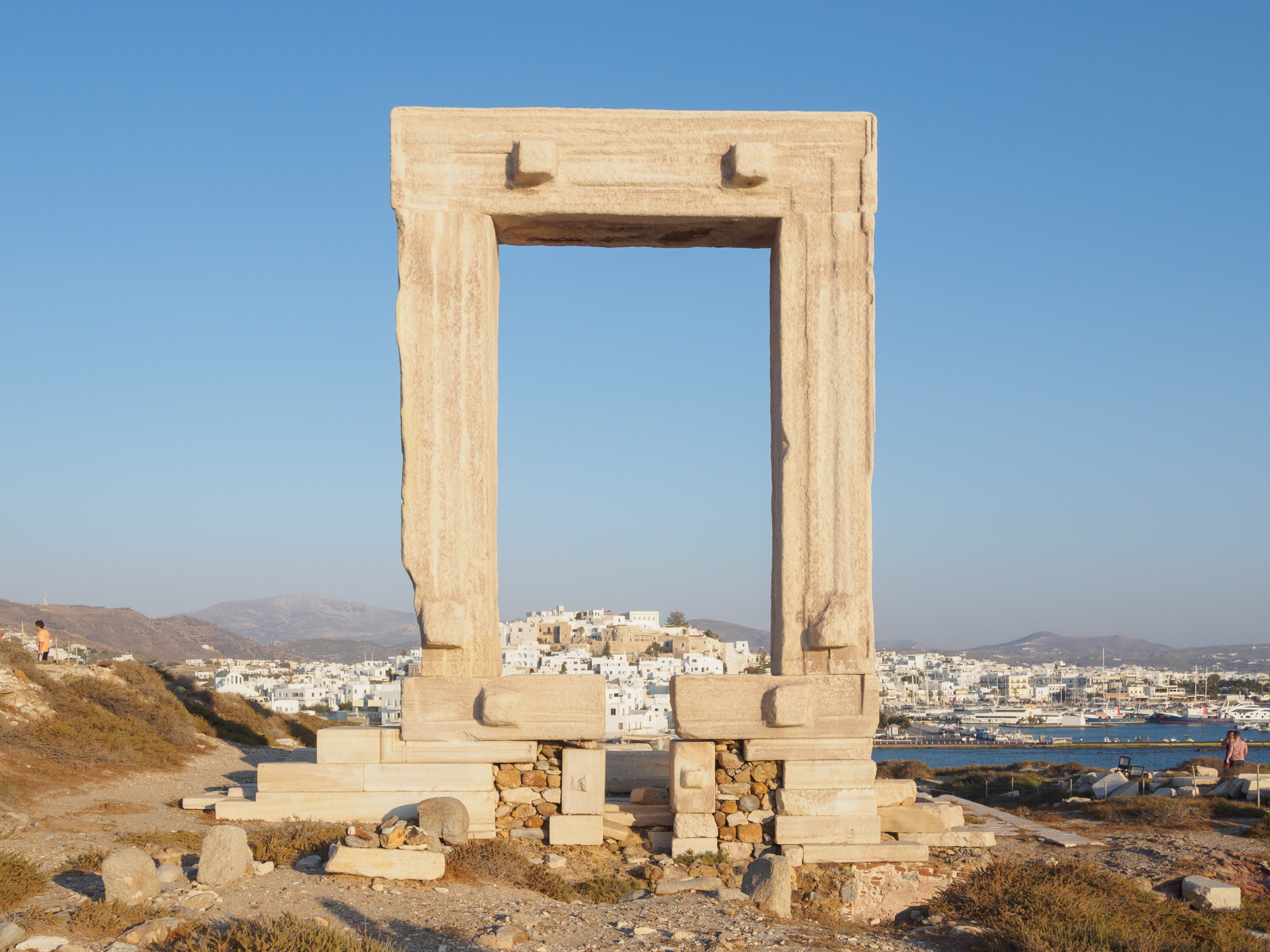
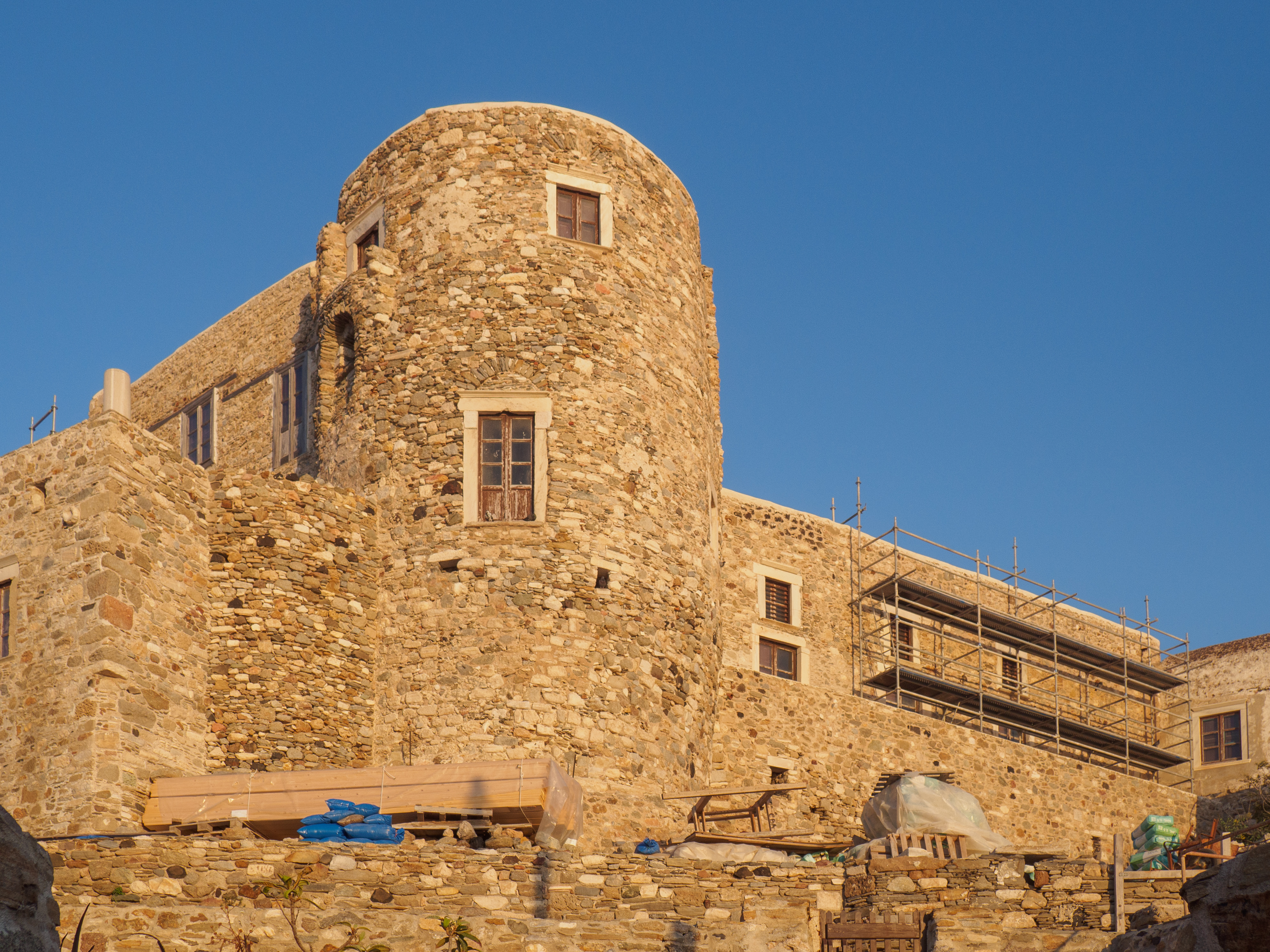
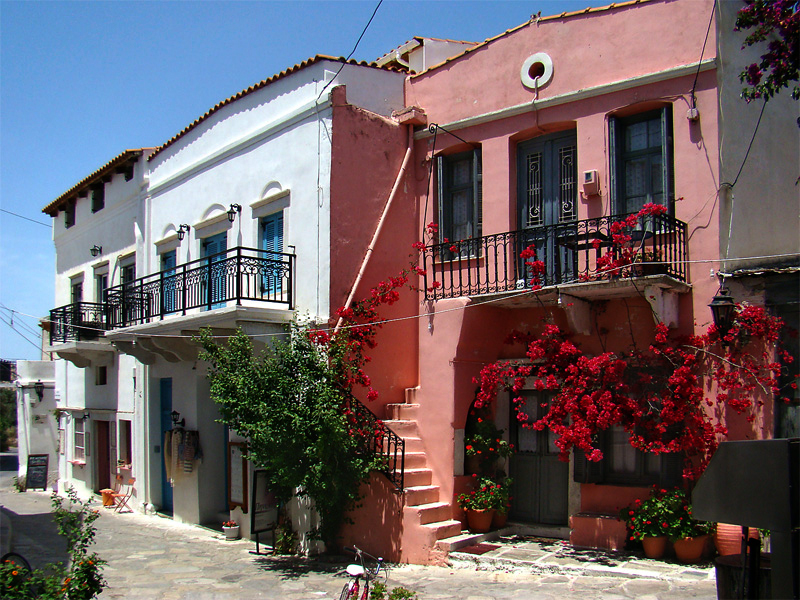
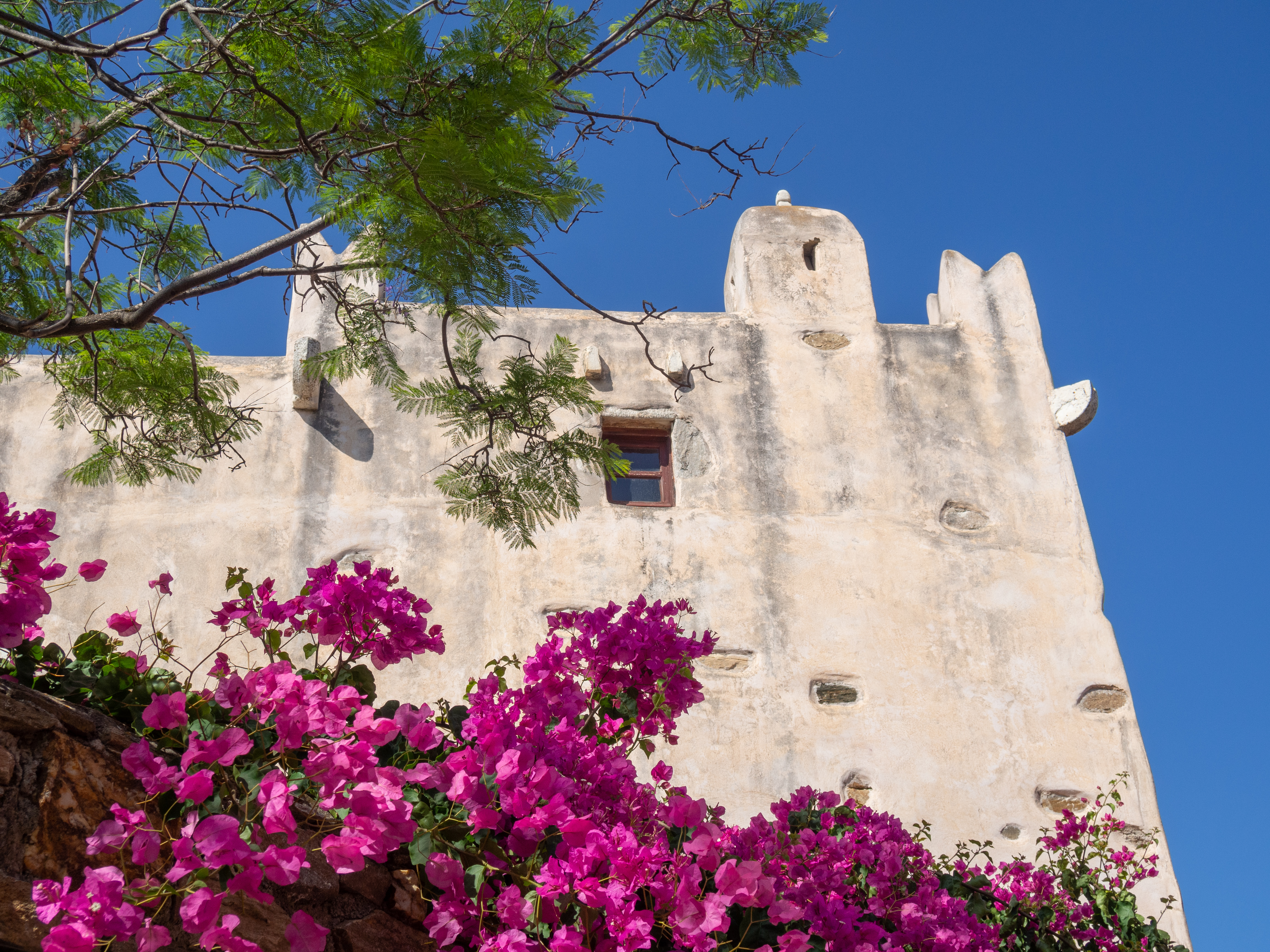
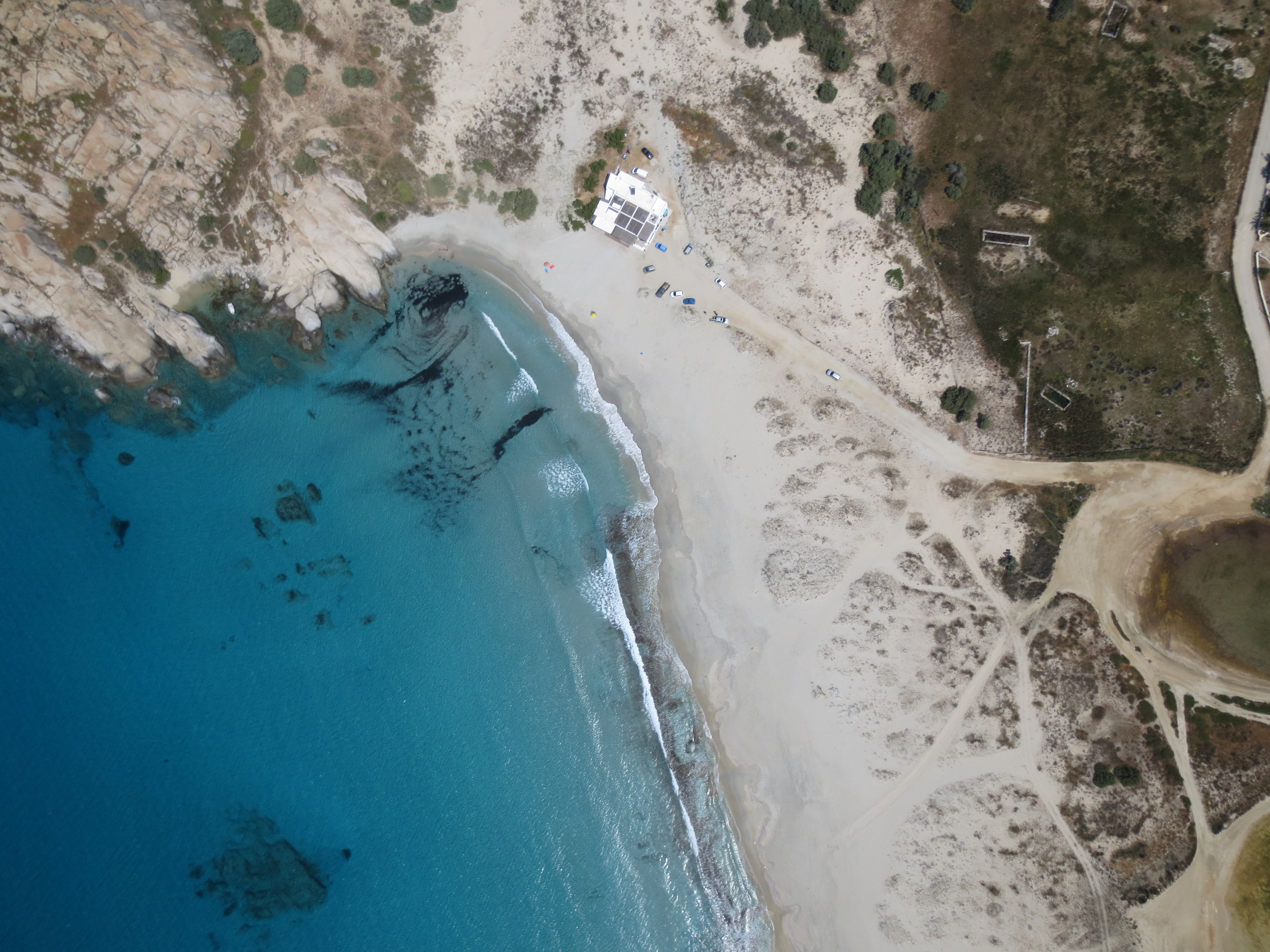
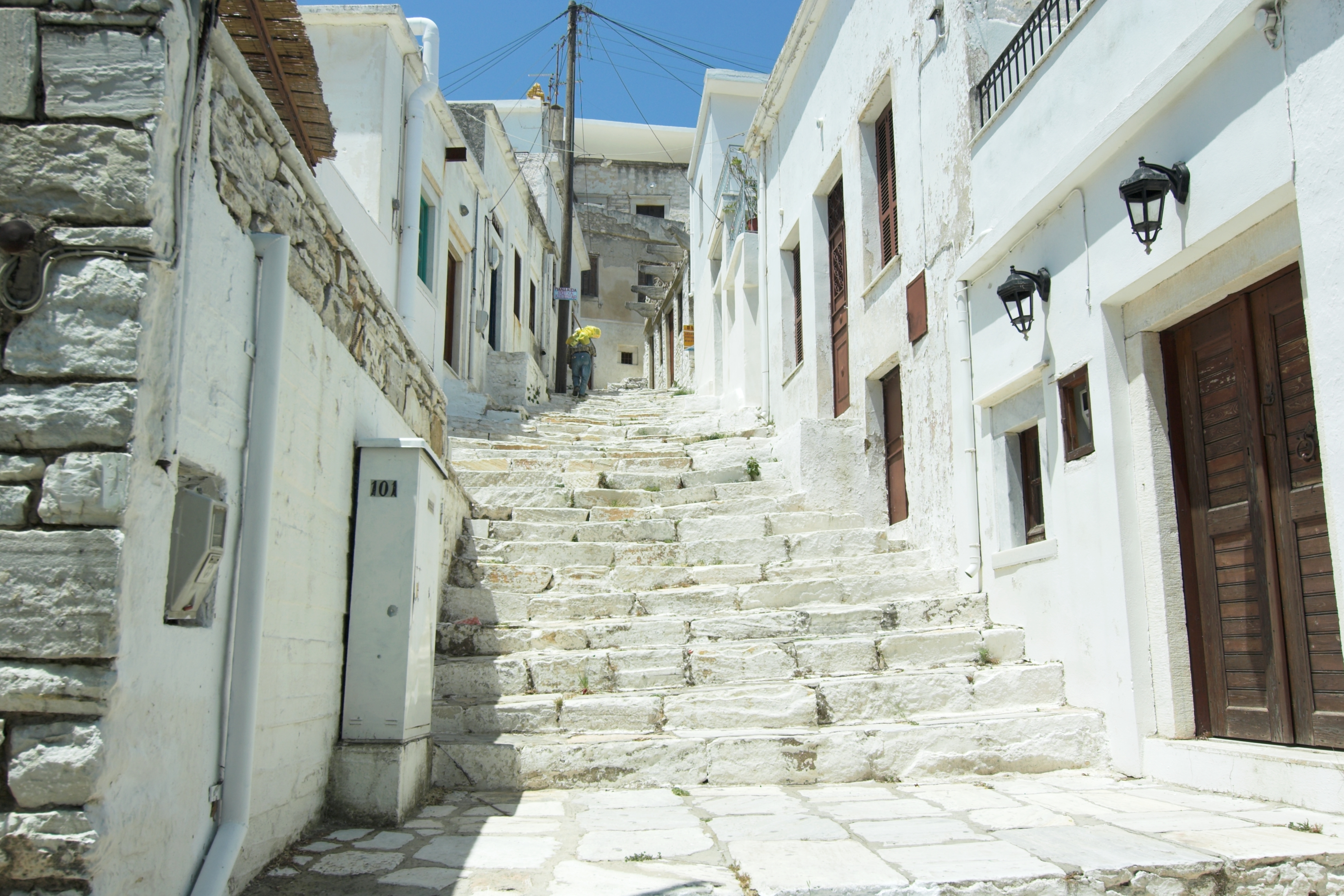
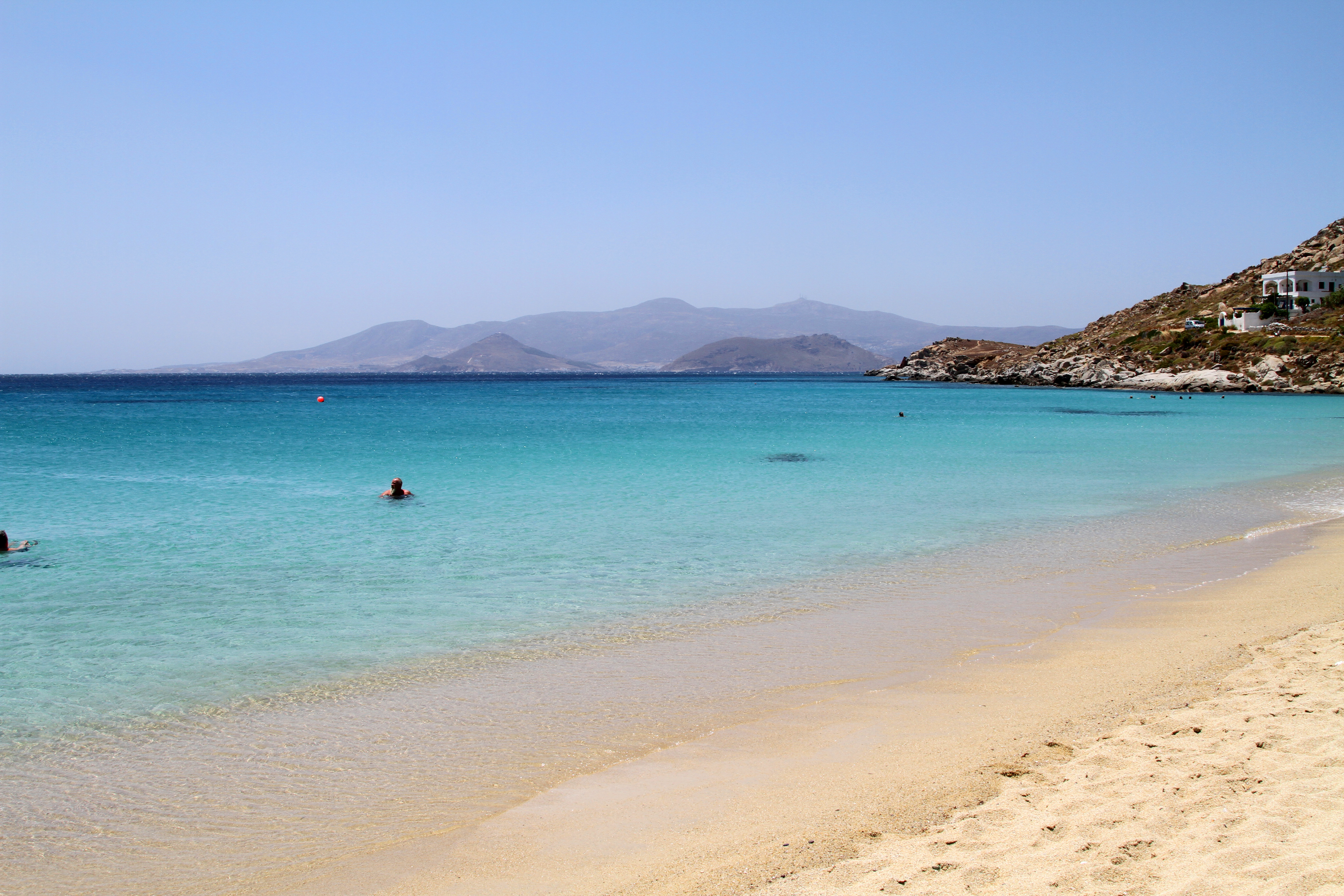
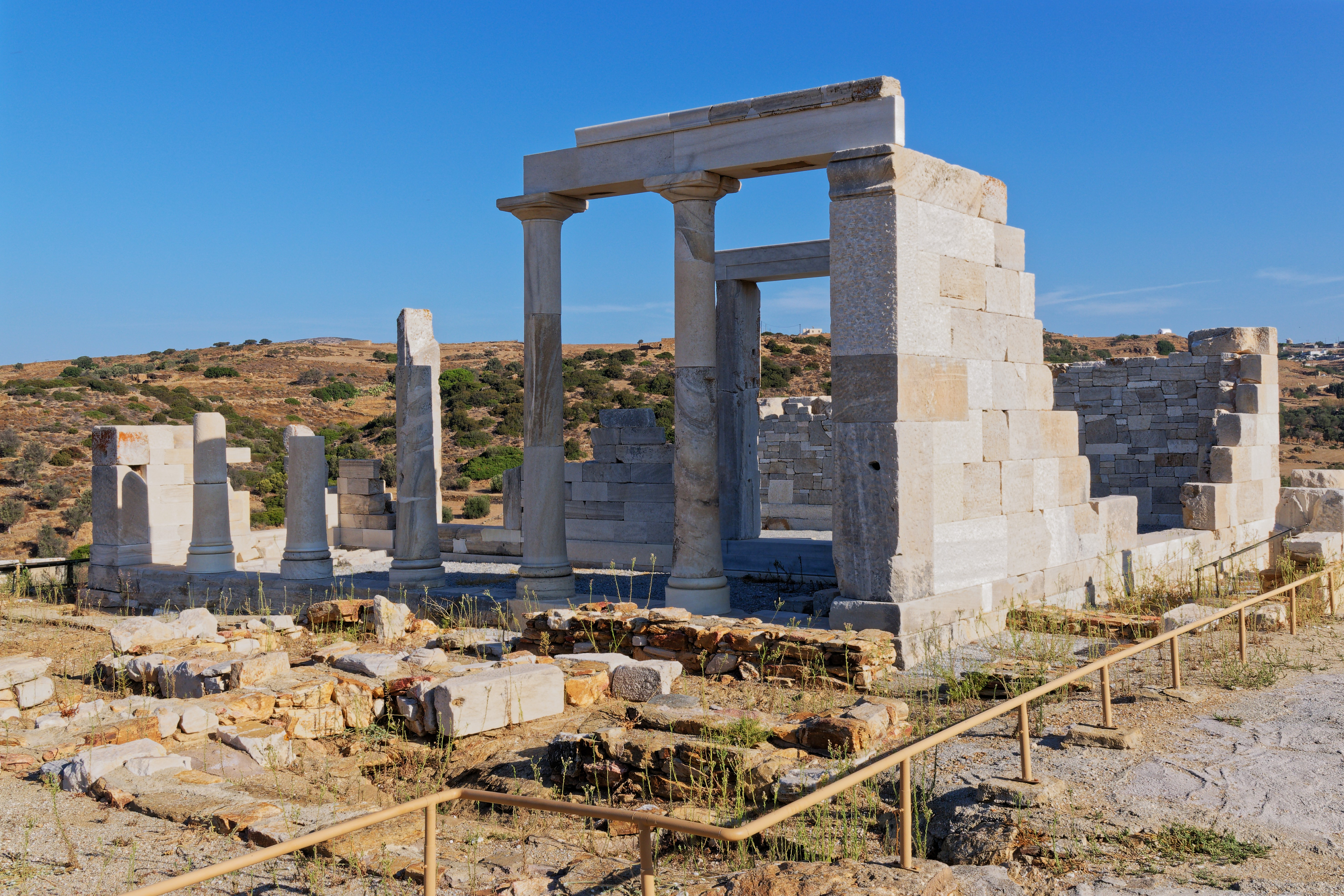
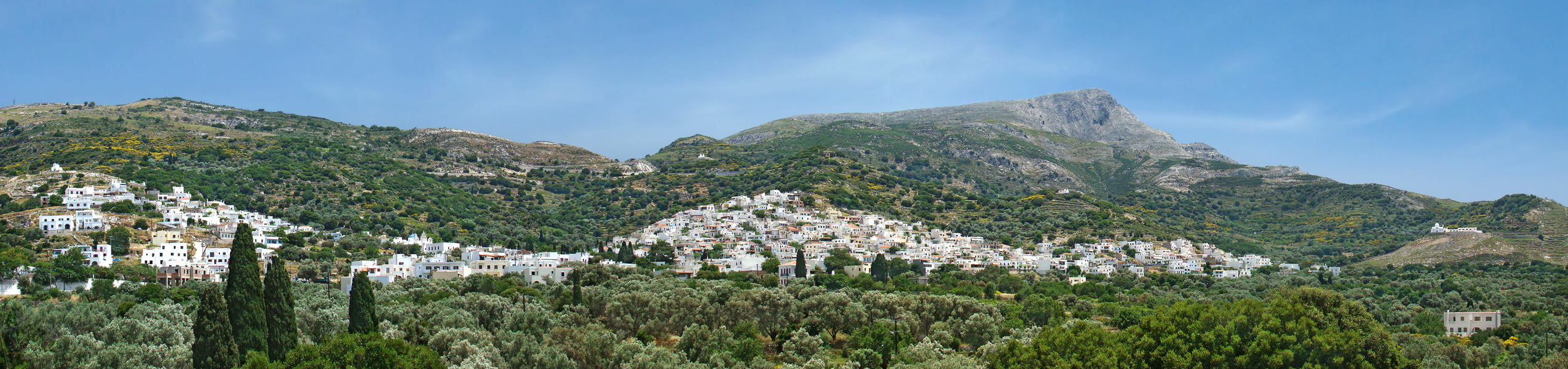
- From top to bottom, left to right: View of Naxos Town (Chora) from Palatia, Temple of Apollo, Castle of Naxos, houses in Chalki, tower in Kato Sangri, Mikri Vigla Beach, street in Apeiranthos, Agios Prokopios Beach, Temple of Demeter, view of the village of Filoti with Mt. Zas in the background.

- Location within Greece

Geography
- Coordinates: 37°05′15″N 25°24′14″E
- Archipelago: Cyclades
- Area: 430 km^{2} (170 sq mi)
- Highest elevation: 1,001 m (3284 ft)
- Highest point: Mt. Zeus

Administration
- Greece
- Region: South Aegean
- Regional unit: Naxos
- Capital city: Naxos (city)

Demographics
- Demonym: Naxiot
- Population: 20,578 (2021)
- Pop. density: 124/km^{2} (321/sq mi)

Additional information
- Official website: https://e-naxos.eu/

Naxos (/ˈnæksɒs, -soʊs/; Greek: Νάξος, pronounced [ˈnaksos]) is a Greek island belonging to the Cyclades island group. It is the largest island in the group. The largest town and capital of the island is Chora or Naxos City, with 8,897 inhabitants out of the total 20,578 in the island (2021 census). The main villages are Filoti, Apiranthos, Vivlos, Agios Arsenios, Koronos and Glynado. It was an important centre during the Bronze Age Cycladic Culture and in the Ancient Greek Archaic Period. The island is famous as a source of emery, a rock rich in corundum, which until modern times was one of the best abrasives available.

== History ==
=== Mythic Naxos ===
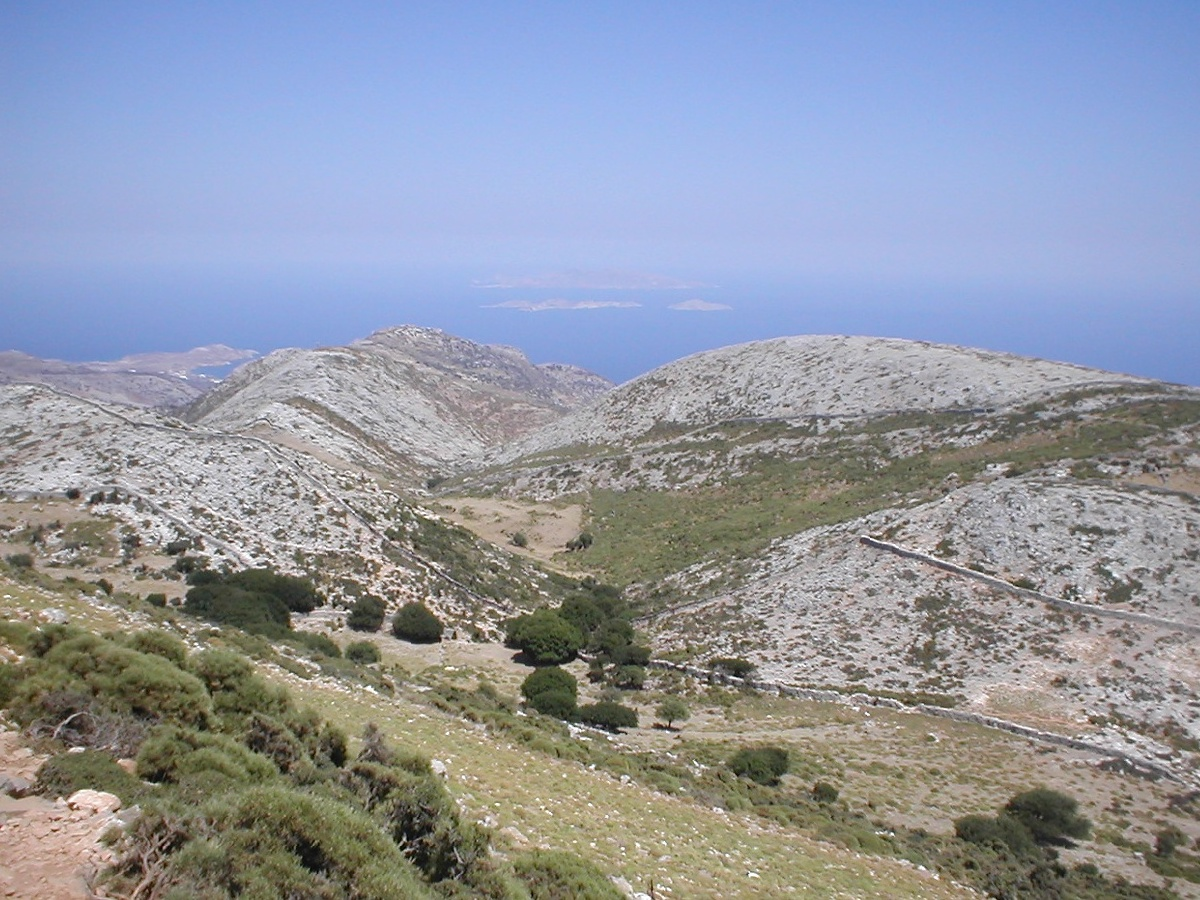
Landscape of the island

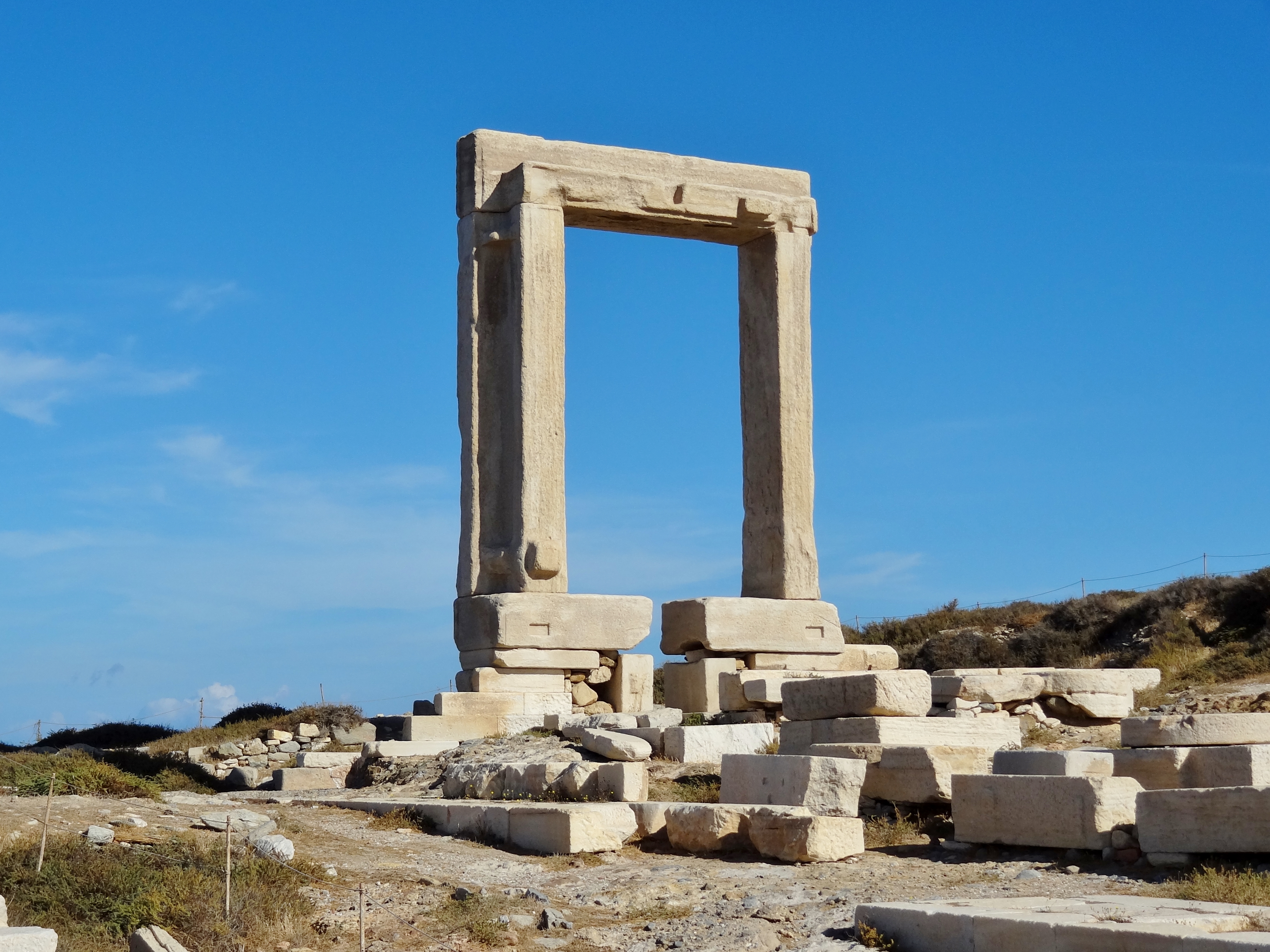
Entrance of Apollo Temple (Portara)

According to Greek mythology, the young Zeus was raised in a cave on Mt Zas ("Zas" meaning "Zeus"). Homer mentions "Dia"; literally the sacred island "of the Goddess". Károly Kerényi explains:

This name, Dia, which means 'heavenly' or 'divine', was applied to several small craggy islands in our [Aegean] sea, all of them lying close to larger islands, such as Crete or Naxos. The name "Dia" was even transferred to the island of Naxos itself, since it was more widely supposed than any other to have been the nuptial isle of Dionysus.

One legend has it that in the Heroic Age before the Trojan War, Theseus abandoned Ariadne on this island after she helped him kill the Minotaur and escape from the Labyrinth. Dionysus (god of wine, festivities, and the primal energy of life) who was the protector of the island, met Ariadne and fell in love with her. But eventually Ariadne, unable to bear her separation from Theseus, either killed herself (according to the Athenians), or ascended to heaven (as the older versions had it). The Naxos portion of the Ariadne myth is also told in the Richard Strauss opera Ariadne auf Naxos (1912).

The giant brothers Otus and Ephialtes figure in at least two Naxos myths: in one, Artemis bought the abandonment of a siege they laid against the gods, by offering to live on Naxos as Otus's lover; in another, the brothers had actually settled Naxos.

It is also said that the sea god Poseidon was passing by Naxos whilst driving his chariot on the sea surface and is where he first laid eyes on his future wife, the nereid Amphitrite as she was dancing there.

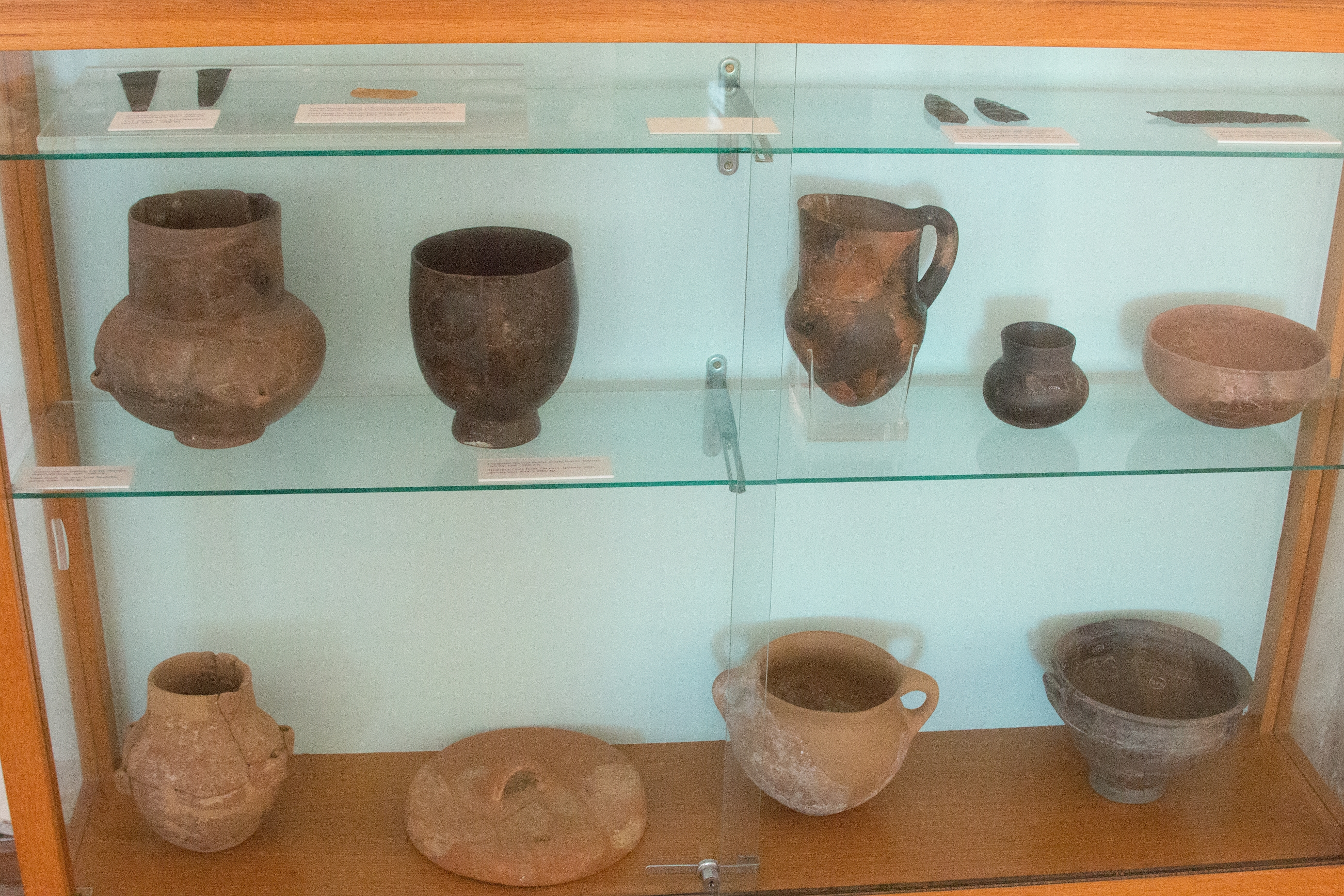
Neolithic finds from the Zas cave: jewelry, pottery, tools; archaeological museum of Naxos

=== Middle Paleolithic era ===
Stelida quarry, south-west of Chora, contains Mousterian tools dating back to the Middle Paleolithic era, which indicates that Neanderthal activity on the island spanned almost 200,000 years ago. The extinct dwarf elephant species Palaeoloxodon lomolinoi lived on Naxos at some point during the Late Pleistocene.

=== Cycladic civilisation ===
Zas Cave, inhabited during the Neolithic era, contained objects of stone from Melos and copper objects including a dagger and gold sheet. The presence of gold and other objects within the cave indicated to researchers the status of the inhabitant.

Emery was exported to other islands during that time.

=== Classical era and Greco-Persian Wars ===
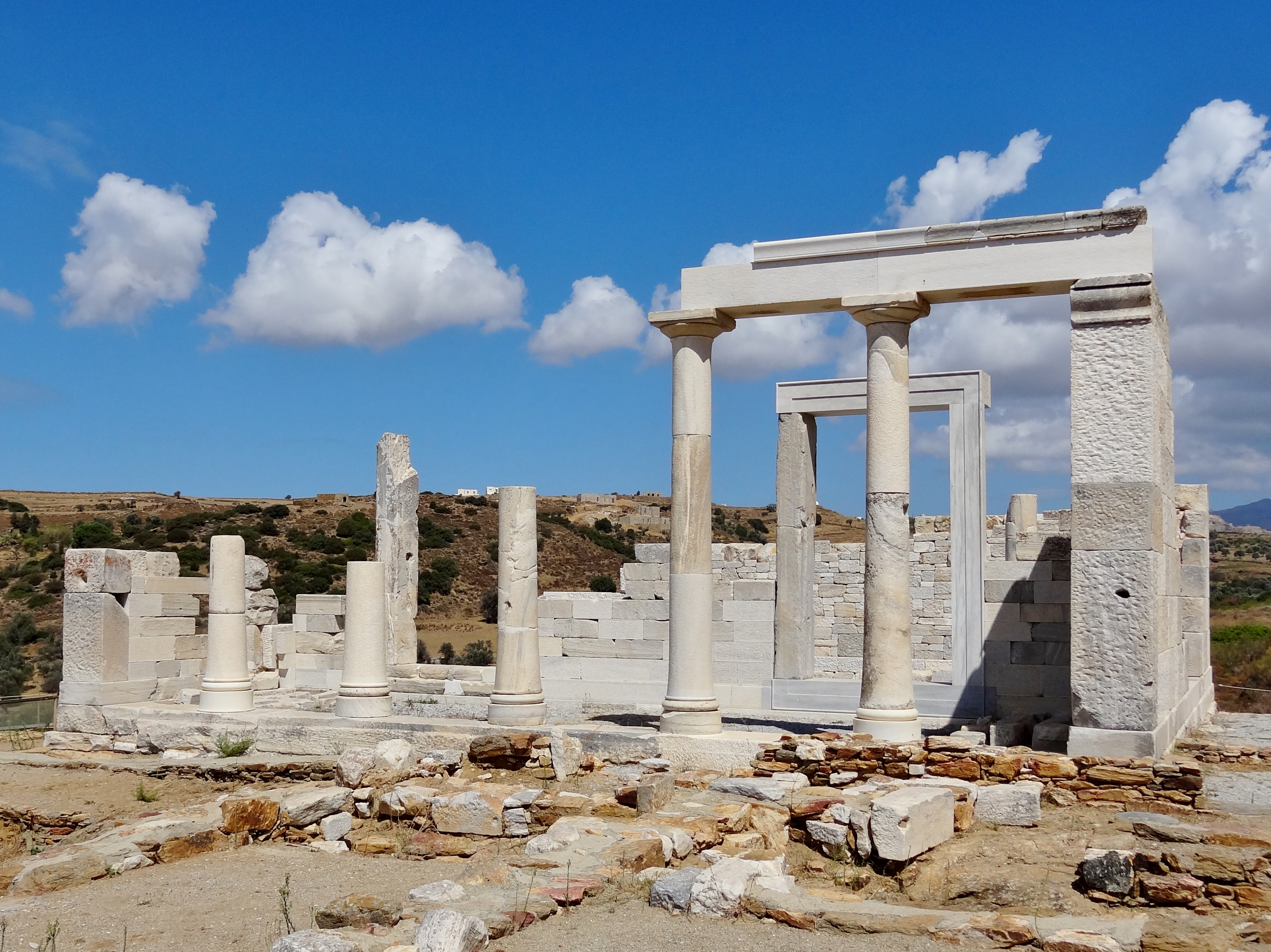
Temple of Demeter

During the 8th and 7th centuries BC, Naxos dominated commerce in the Cyclades.

Herodotus describes Naxos circa 500 BC as the most prosperous Greek island.

In 499 BC, an unsuccessful attack on Naxos by Persian forces led several prominent men in the Greek cities of Ionia to rebel against the Persian Empire in the Ionian Revolt, and then to the Persian War between Greece and Persia.

Naxos was the first Greek city-state to attempt to leave the Delian League circa 469 BC; Athens quickly quashed the notion and forcibly removed all military naval vessels from the island's control. Athens then demanded all future payments from Naxos in the form of gold rather than military aid.

=== Byzantine era ===
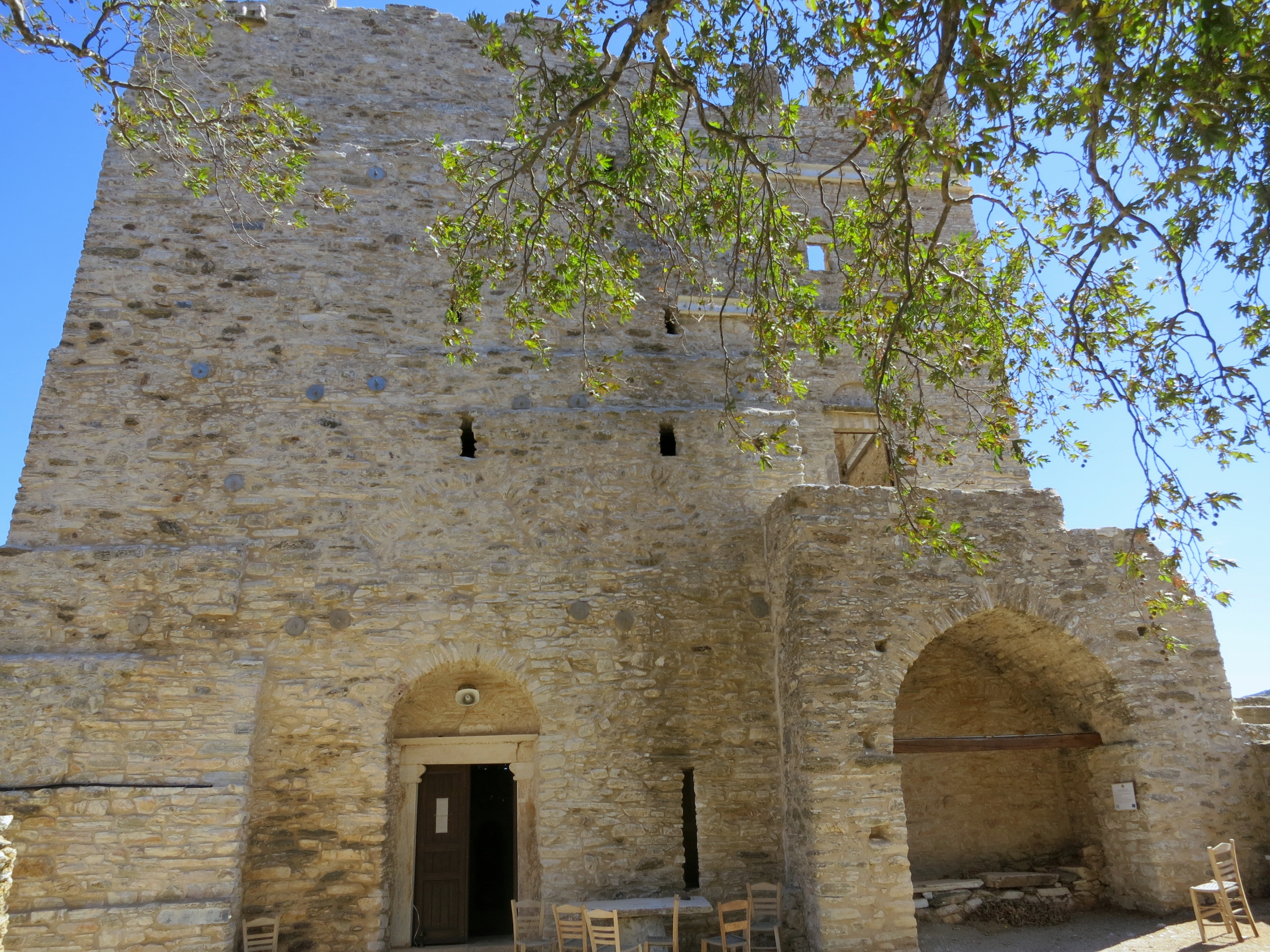
Fotodotis monastery

In Late Antiquity, the island was part of the province of the Islands.

Pope Martin I was detained on the island of Naxos for almost a year after he was arrested by Byzantine authorities in Rome due to his holding of a synod that condemned monotheletism. He was held on the island prior to being taken to Constantinople for trial. While detained on the island, he wrote to a certain Theodore living in Constantinople.

Under the Byzantine Empire, Naxos was part of the thema of the Aegean Sea, which was established in the mid-9th century.

In Byzantine times, the island's capital was on the southern fortress of Apalyres. During this time, it suffered from Saracen raids, particular during the existence of the Emirate of Crete (824–961), to which the island occasionally paid tribute. Traces of Muslim artistic influence are visible in frescoes from the 10th century. Nevertheless, as in Antiquity, Naxos was celebrated for its agriculture and animal husbandry; the 12th-century geographer al-Idrisi records extensive cattle raising on the island.

In the late 12th century, it may have been the capital of a short-lived thema of the "Dodekanesos".

=== Duchy of Naxos ===
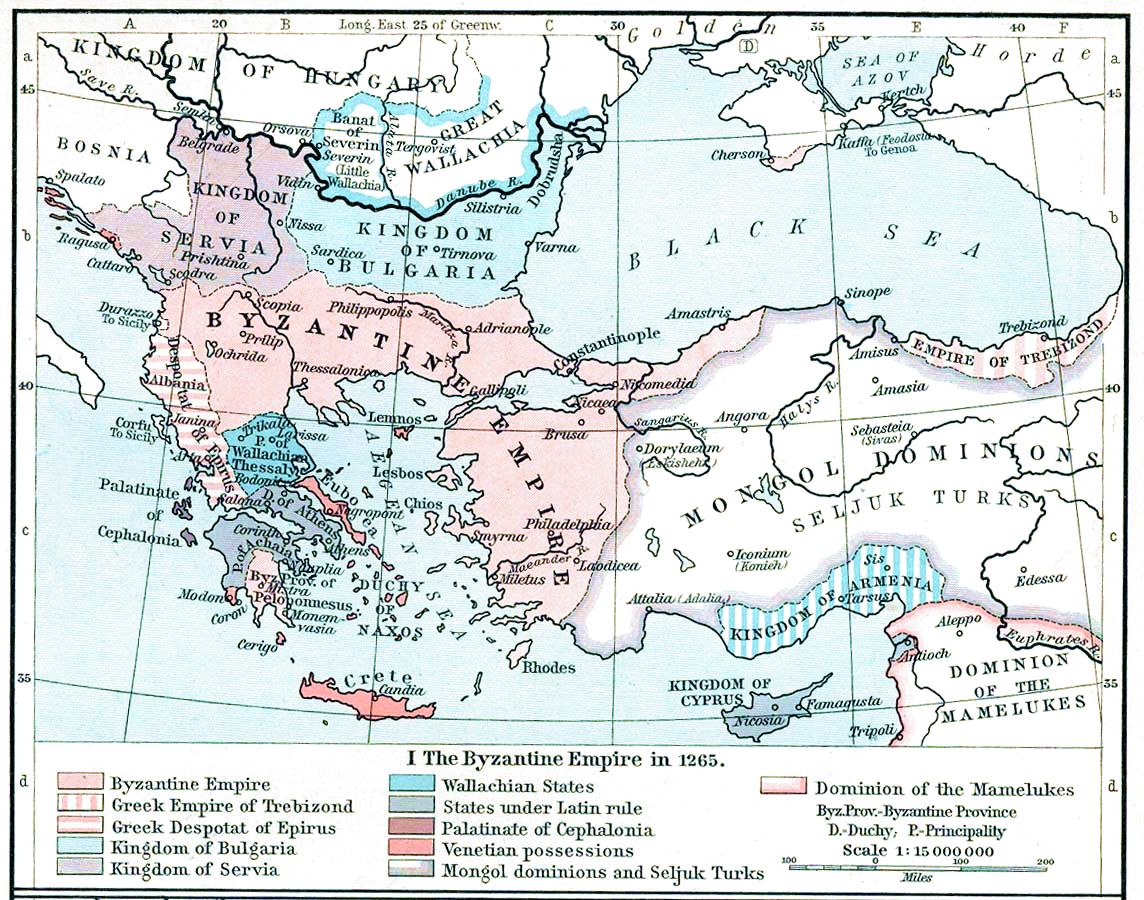
The Duchy of Naxos and other Frankish states, carved from the Byzantine Empire, as they were in 1265.

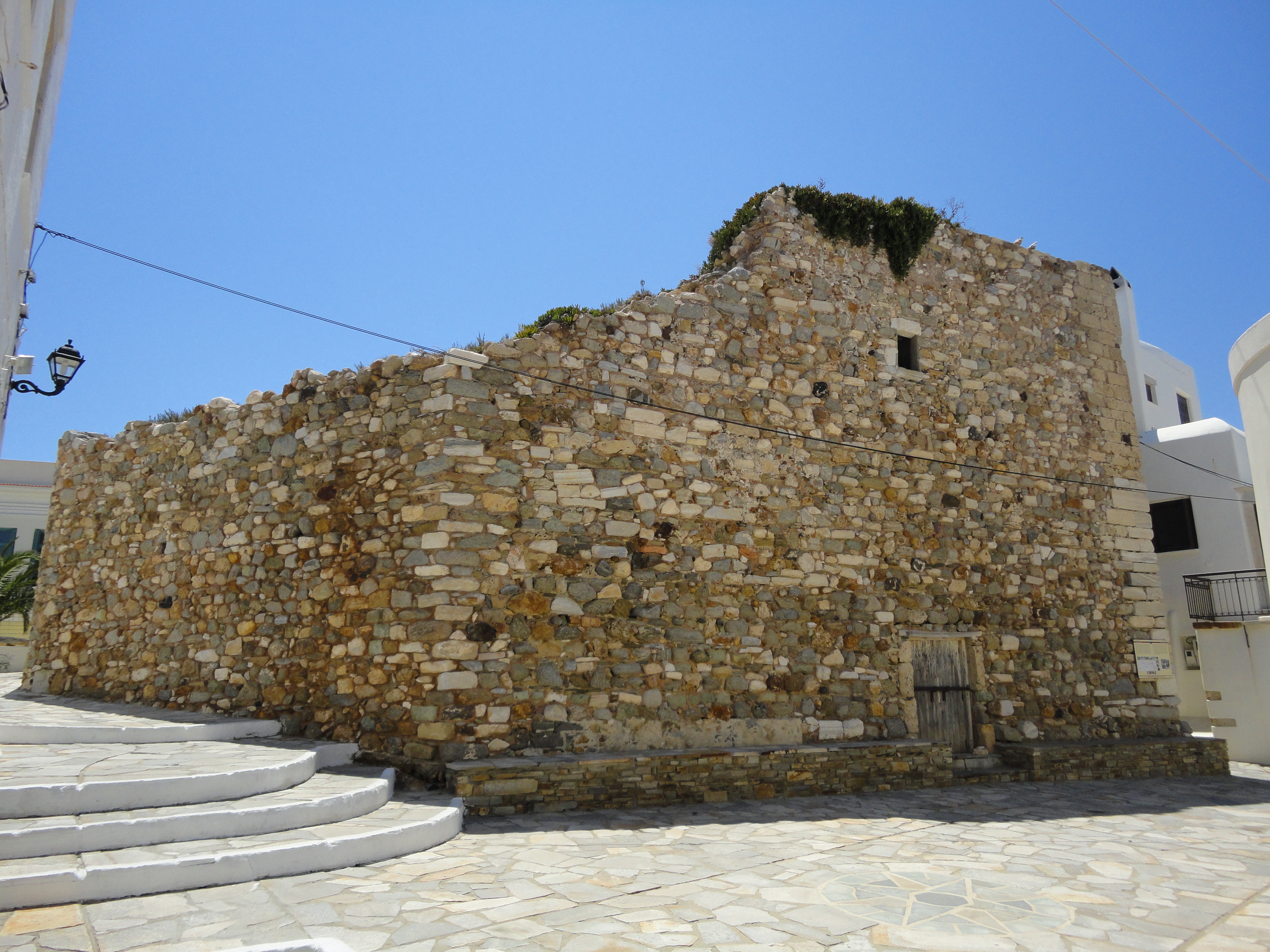
Sanudo tower, part of the Duchal Palace

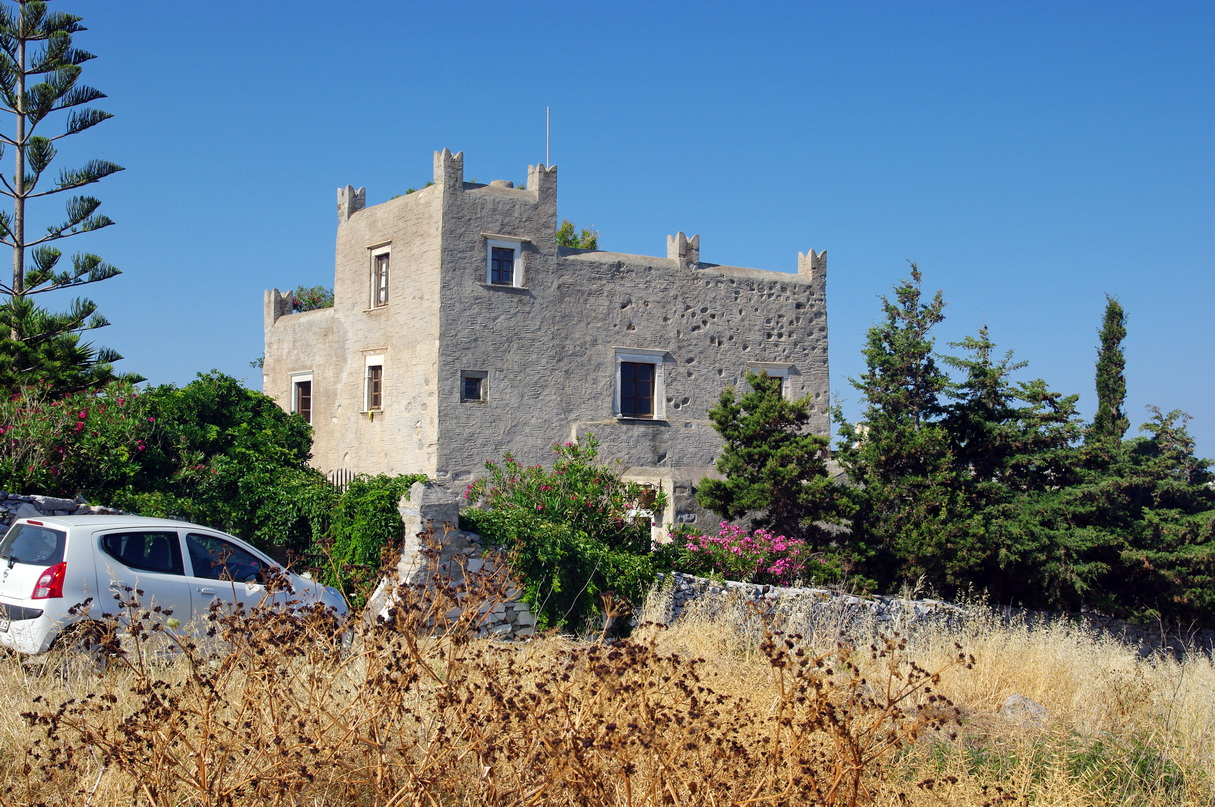
Belonia tower

In the aftermath of the Fourth Crusade, with a Latin Empire under the influence of the Venetians established at Constantinople, the Venetian Marco Sanudo conquered Naxos and most of the other Cyclades in 1205–1207. Of all the islands, only on Naxos was there any opposition to Sanudo: a group of Genoese pirates had occupied the castle between the end of Byzantine rule and Sanudo's arrival. To steel his band's resolve, Sanudo burnt his galleys "and bade his companions to conquer or die". The pirates surrendered the castle after a five week siege.

Naxos became the seat of Sanudo's realm, known as the "Duchy of Naxos" or "Duchy of the Archipelago". Twenty-one dukes in two dynasties ruled the Archipelago, until 1566; Venetian rule continued in scattered islands of the Aegean until 1714. Under Venetian rule, the island was called by its Italian name, Nasso.

The Sanudi introduced Western feudal law to the island, based on the Assizes of Romania. However, the native Greek population continued to use Byzantine law for civil matters at least until the late 16th century.

In the 13th century, following the capture of Antalya and Alanya on the southern Anatolian coast by the Seljuk Turks, refugees from these areas settled in Naxos. In the 14th century, the island was once more exposed to raids, this time from the Anatolian Turkish beyliks, chiefly the Aydınids. In turn, the Sanudi assisted the Genoese in capturing Chios in 1304 and the Knights Hospitaller in their conquest of Rhodes in 1309, in order to stop these islands being used as Turkish pirate base. Nevertheless, raids against Naxos are recorded in 1324 and 1326, and in 1341, Umur of Aydın carried off 6,000 people from the island and imposed a payment of tribute. Two years later, however, the Smyrniote crusade captured his main port, Smyrna.

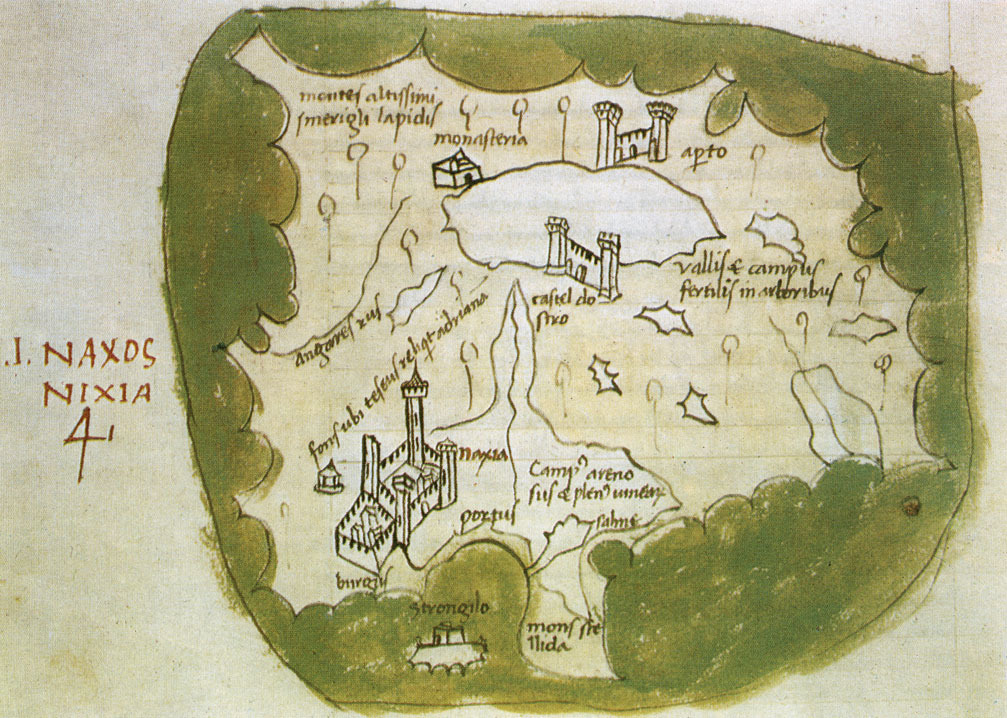
Fifteenth century map of Naxos by Cristoforo Buondelmonti

The relief was temporary, however, as Turkish raids recommenced later in the century. The island was so depopulated that Cristoforo Buondelmonti in c. 1420 claimed that there were not enough men to wed the Naxiot women. The rising Ottoman Empire first attacked the island in 1416, but the Sultans recognized Venetian overlordship over the Duchy in successive treaties, in exchange for an annual tribute.

=== Ottoman era (1566–1821) ===
The last Latin Christian duke, Giacomo IV Crispo, was deposed in 1566 by Ottoman Sultan Selim II, son of Suleiman the Magnificent, appointing Portuguese Sephardi diplomat and administrator Joseph Nasi, as Duke of Naxos. Represented locally by one Francesco Coronello, Nasi governed principally from his palace of Belvedere near Constantinople. Dying in 1579, he was the penultimate holder of the title.

Upon his death, the Ottomans formally annexed the territory. The last Duke of Naxos and Paros was Gaspar Graziani, a Dalmatian nobleman, awarded the title by Ahmed I in 1616. But in a bid for the Moldavian throne, Graziani sought alliance with Poland's King Sigismund, and the Sultan ordered him removed in 1617. He evaded capture until 1620, when supporters murdered him in fear of Ottoman reprisal.

Very few Turks ever settled on Naxos, and Turkish influence on the island was insignificant. Under Ottoman rule the island was known in Turkish as Nakşa. Ottoman rule lasted until 1821, when Naxos joined the Greek War of Independence with its fleet; Naxos finally became part of the autonomous (1827) and fully independent (1830) Greek state.

== Early commentators ==
Early commentators in English on the island include:

Bernard Randolph, in The Present State of the Islands in the Archipelago (1687, Oxford, pp. 20–21).

Jean de Thévenot, in Travels into the Levant (1687, London, pp. 103–105).

Joseph Pitton de Tournefort, in A Voyage Into the Levant (1718, London, pp. 161–176).

Thomas Bankes et al., in A new royal authentic and complete system of universal geography antient and modern... (1787, London, p. 943).

Edward Daniel Clarke, in Travels in Various Countries (1814, vol. 3, section 2, London, pp. 377–400).

William Martin Leake, in Travels in Northern Greece (1835, vol. 3, London, pp. 93–95).

Theodore Bent, in The Cyclades, or Life Among the Insular Greeks (1885, London, pp. 329–371).

== Geography ==
=== Climate ===
Naxos experiences both a Mediterranean climate (Csa) and a hot semi-arid climate (Köppen climate classification: BSh) depending on the location. According to the stations of the National Observatory of Athens, various locations in Naxos have a hot semi-arid climate. Inland areas of the island are much wetter and cooler in winter, owing to their higher elevation.

Climate data for Naxos town (0m)
Month	Jan	Feb	Mar	Apr	May	Jun	Jul	Aug	Sep	Oct	Nov	Dec	Year
Record high °C (°F)	22.8 (73.0)	26.2 (79.2)	28.6 (83.5)	30.5 (86.9)	33.6 (92.5)	37.2 (99.0)	37.9 (100.2)	36.0 (96.8)	34.0 (93.2)	30.8 (87.4)	28.8 (83.8)	26.0 (78.8)	37.9 (100.2)
Mean daily maximum °C (°F)	14.4 (57.9)	14.6 (58.3)	15.8 (60.4)	18.7 (65.7)	22.1 (71.8)	25.9 (78.6)	27.1 (80.8)	27.0 (80.6)	25.1 (77.2)	21.9 (71.4)	18.8 (65.8)	15.9 (60.6)	20.6 (69.1)
Daily mean °C (°F)	12.2 (54.0)	12.3 (54.1)	13.4 (56.1)	16.1 (61.0)	19.6 (67.3)	23.5 (74.3)	25.1 (77.2)	25.0 (77.0)	23.0 (73.4)	19.7 (67.5)	16.4 (61.5)	13.7 (56.7)	18.3 (65.0)
Mean daily minimum °C (°F)	9.6 (49.3)	9.4 (48.9)	10.4 (50.7)	12.5 (54.5)	15.7 (60.3)	19.6 (67.3)	22.0 (71.6)	22.2 (72.0)	20.1 (68.2)	17.0 (62.6)	13.7 (56.7)	11.1 (52.0)	15.3 (59.5)
Record low °C (°F)	0.4 (32.7)	−1.0 (30.2)	2.0 (35.6)	5.1 (41.2)	7.1 (44.8)	12.0 (53.6)	14.8 (58.6)	13.6 (56.5)	11.2 (52.2)	7.2 (45.0)	4.5 (40.1)	2.0 (35.6)	−1.0 (30.2)
Average precipitation mm (inches)	67.9 (2.67)	56.3 (2.22)	45.7 (1.80)	17.6 (0.69)	10.6 (0.42)	2.4 (0.09)	0.9 (0.04)	1.6 (0.06)	7.7 (0.30)	38.6 (1.52)	52.3 (2.06)	69.0 (2.72)	370.6 (14.59)
Average precipitation days	12.7	11.0	9.5	6.0	3.6	1.1	0.4	0.3	1.9	5.5	8.8	12.6	73.4
Average relative humidity (%)	73.5	71.8	71.7	70.6	70.8	67.9	68.6	70.0	70.8	73.0	74.1	74.0	71.4
Source 1: Hellenic National Meteorological Service
Source 2: NOAA (extremes 1961-1990), Info Climat (extremes 1991-present)

Climate data for Apeiranthos village (600m)
Month	Jan	Feb	Mar	Apr	May	Jun	Jul	Aug	Sep	Oct	Nov	Dec	Year
Mean daily maximum °C (°F)	9 (48)	10.2 (50.4)	13 (55)	15.4 (59.7)	21.9 (71.4)	25.1 (77.2)	27.9 (82.2)	28.7 (83.7)	24.9 (76.8)	22.5 (72.5)	16.1 (61.0)	12.3 (54.1)	18.9 (66.0)
Mean daily minimum °C (°F)	4.8 (40.6)	5.9 (42.6)	7.8 (46.0)	9.7 (49.5)	15 (59)	18.6 (65.5)	21.1 (70.0)	21.8 (71.2)	18.7 (65.7)	16.3 (61.3)	11.7 (53.1)	8.6 (47.5)	13.3 (56.0)
Average precipitation mm (inches)	208.3 (8.20)	137.8 (5.43)	80.3 (3.16)	77.4 (3.05)	4.7 (0.19)	1.1 (0.04)	19.4 (0.76)	0.1 (0.00)	24.2 (0.95)	60.9 (2.40)	91.1 (3.59)	155.9 (6.14)	861.2 (33.91)
Source: http://penteli.meteo.gr/stations/apiranthos/ (2019 - 2020 averages)

== Economy ==
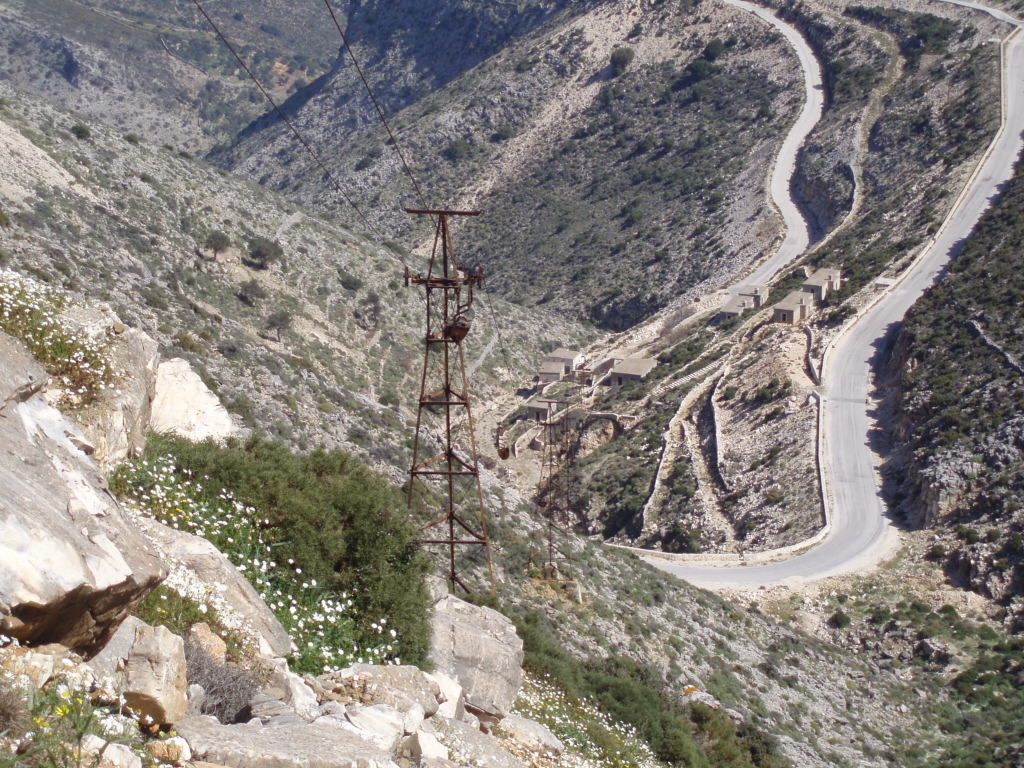
Emery mine

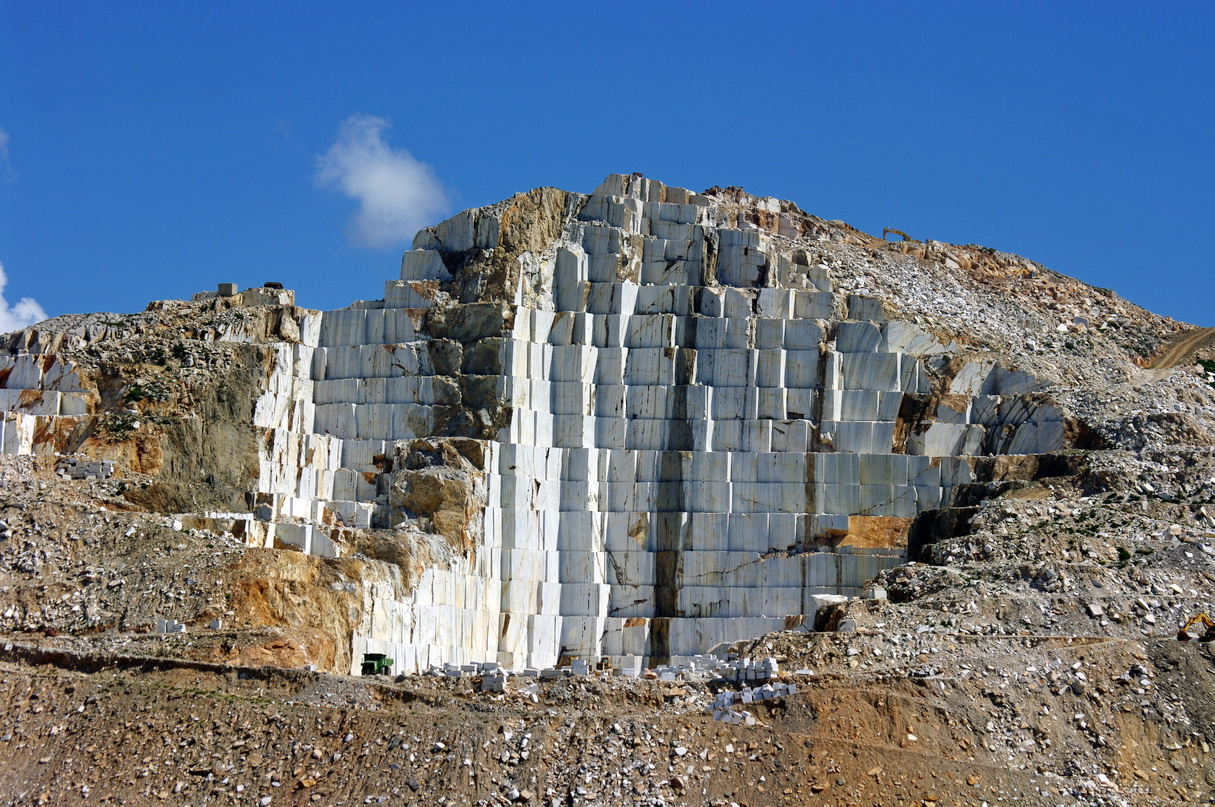
Marble quarry of Naxos. Note large green truck at lower left of the marble face.

=== Historical population ===
Year	Island population	Change
1981	14,037	–
1991	14,838	+801/+5.71%
2001	18,188	+3,350/+22.58%
2011	18,904	+716/+3.93%

=== Tourism ===
Naxos is a popular tourist destination, with several places of touristic interest, including beaches, villages and old ruins. Beaches on the island include Agia Anna, Agios Prokopios, Aliko, Kastraki, Mikri Vigla, Plaka, and Agios Georgios, most of them on the western side of the island, near Chora. Like other cycladic islands, Naxos is considered a windy place perfect for windsurfing, as well as kitesurfing. There are seven sports clubs on the island that offer both of these sports and other water activities.

=== Agriculture ===
Naxos is the most fertile island of the Cyclades. It has a good supply of water in a region where water is usually inadequate. Mount Zeus (1,001 metres or 3,284 feet) is the highest peak in the Cyclades, and tends to trap the clouds, permitting greater rainfall. This has made agriculture an important economic sector with various vegetable and fruit crops as well as cattle breeding, making Naxos the most self-sufficient island in the Cyclades. Naxos is well known within Greece for its "Arseniko Naxou" cheese, potatoes, Kitron (a local lemon-citrus spirit), and Naxian honey (which is largely derived from the nectar of thyme).

=== Marble ===
The quarrying of marble on Naxos began before 550 BCE. Naxian marble was used for the creation of the roof tiles at ancient Olympia and on the Athenian Acropolis, As of 2016, about 5,000 m³ of high value Naxian marble was being exported annually.

== Sports ==
- Pannaxiakos F.C.
- Pannaxiakos A.O. (sports club)

== Notable people ==
- Ecumenical Patriarch Anthimus III of Constantinople (1762–1842)
- Ecumenical Patriarch Callinicus III of Constantinople (died 1726)
- Keti Chomata (1946–2010), singer
- Manolis Glezos (1922–2020), rebel, politician, writer
- Giannoulis Fakinos (born 1989), soccer player
- Iakovos Kambanelis (1922–2011), poet, playwright, lyricist and novelist
- Kostas Manolas (born 1991), soccer player
- Stelios Manolas (born 1961), soccer player
- Nikolaos Mykonios, fighter of the Greek War of Independence and officer of the Greek Army
- Iakovos Nafpliotis (1864–1942), cantor
- Nicodemus the Hagiorite (1749–1809), saint
- Giorgos Ninios (born 1959), actor
- Michalis Polytarchou, basketball player, Former Captain of AEK Athens BC
- Petros Protopapadakis (1854–1922), Prime Minister of Greece

== Gallery ==
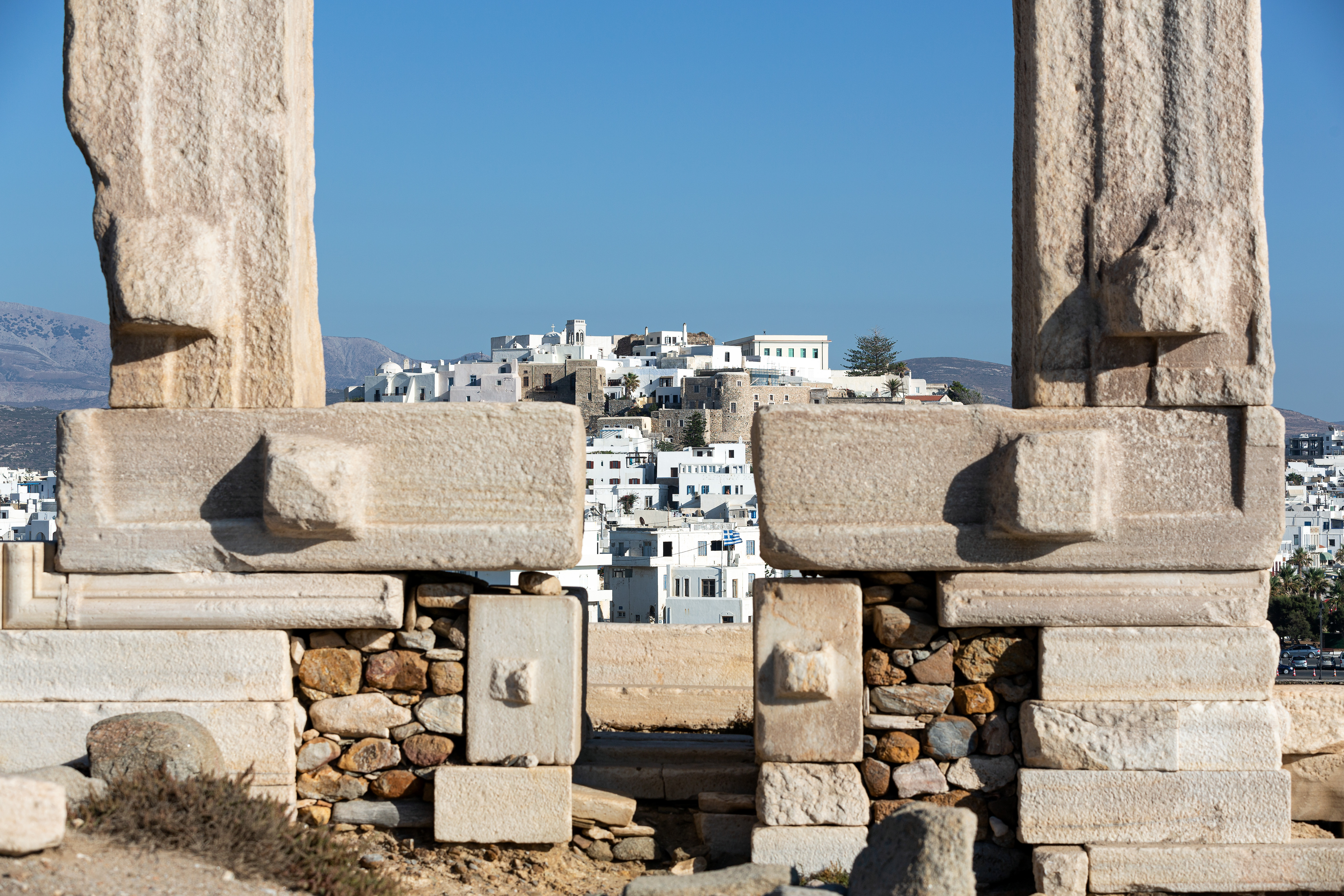
View through Portara on the peninsula Palátia towards Chora of Naxos

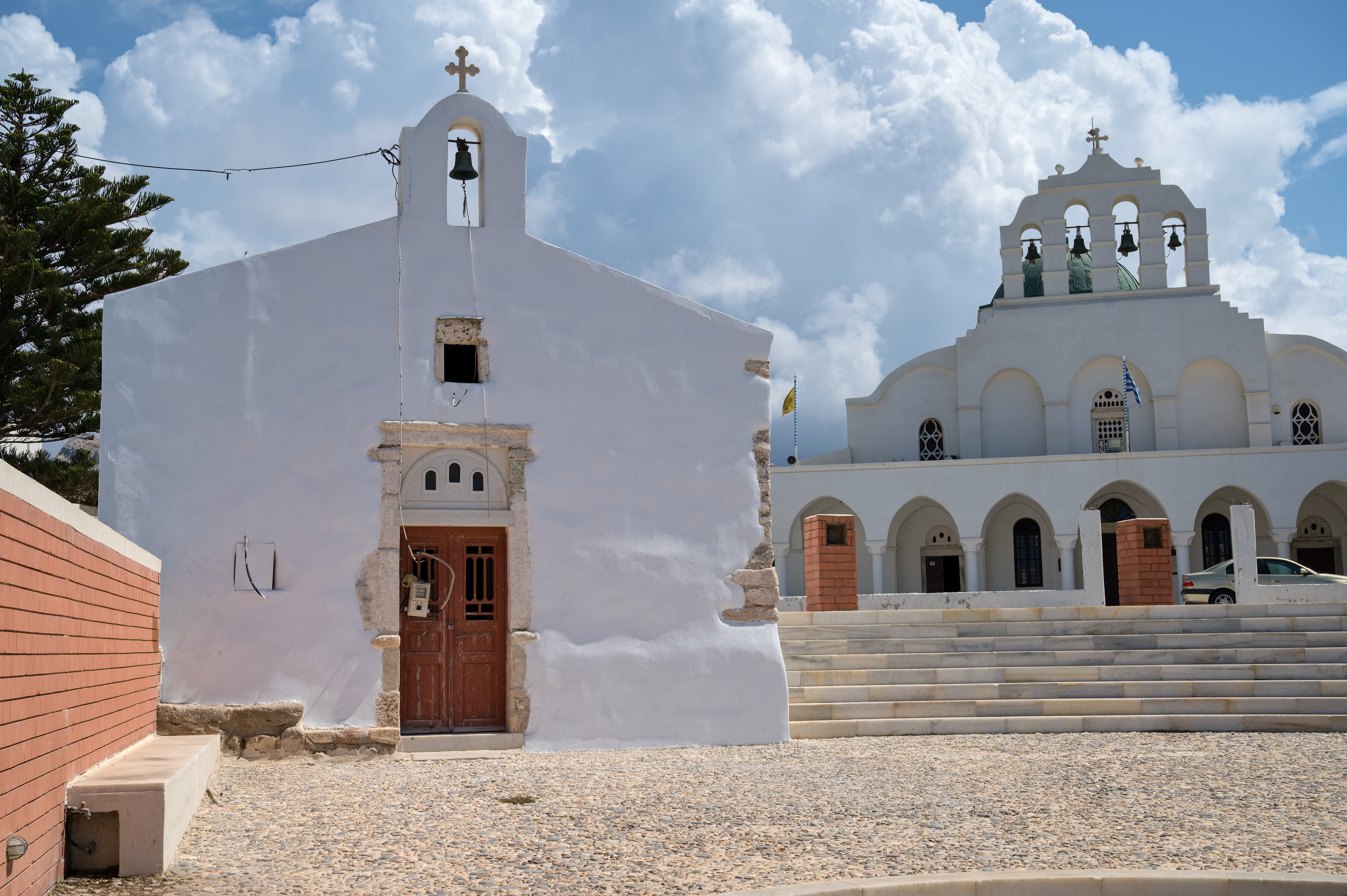
Agios Nikolaos on the Grotta of Naxos Town (Chora)

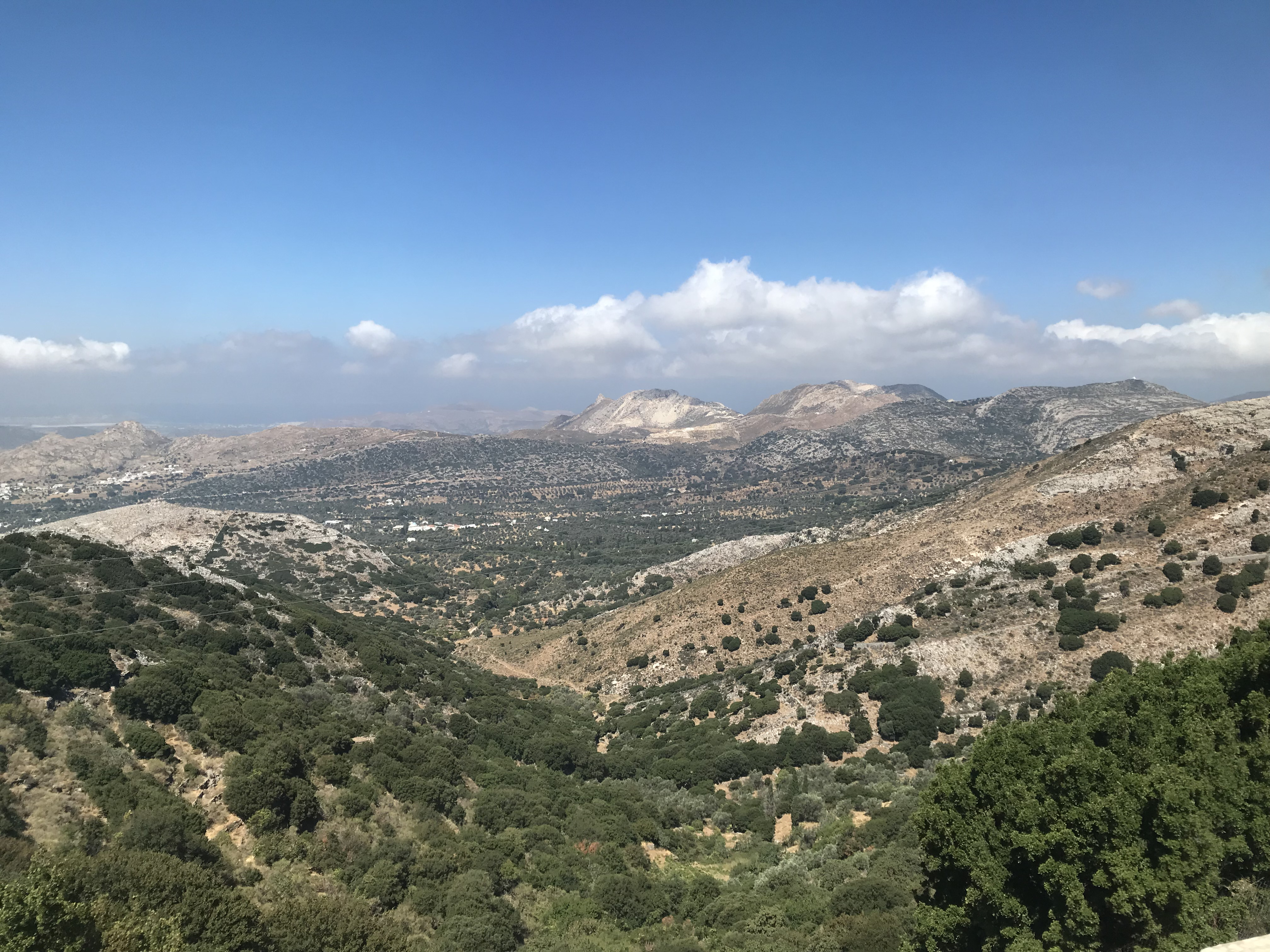
Valley between Potamia and Moni, Naxos. View from road from Apeiranthos to Filoti

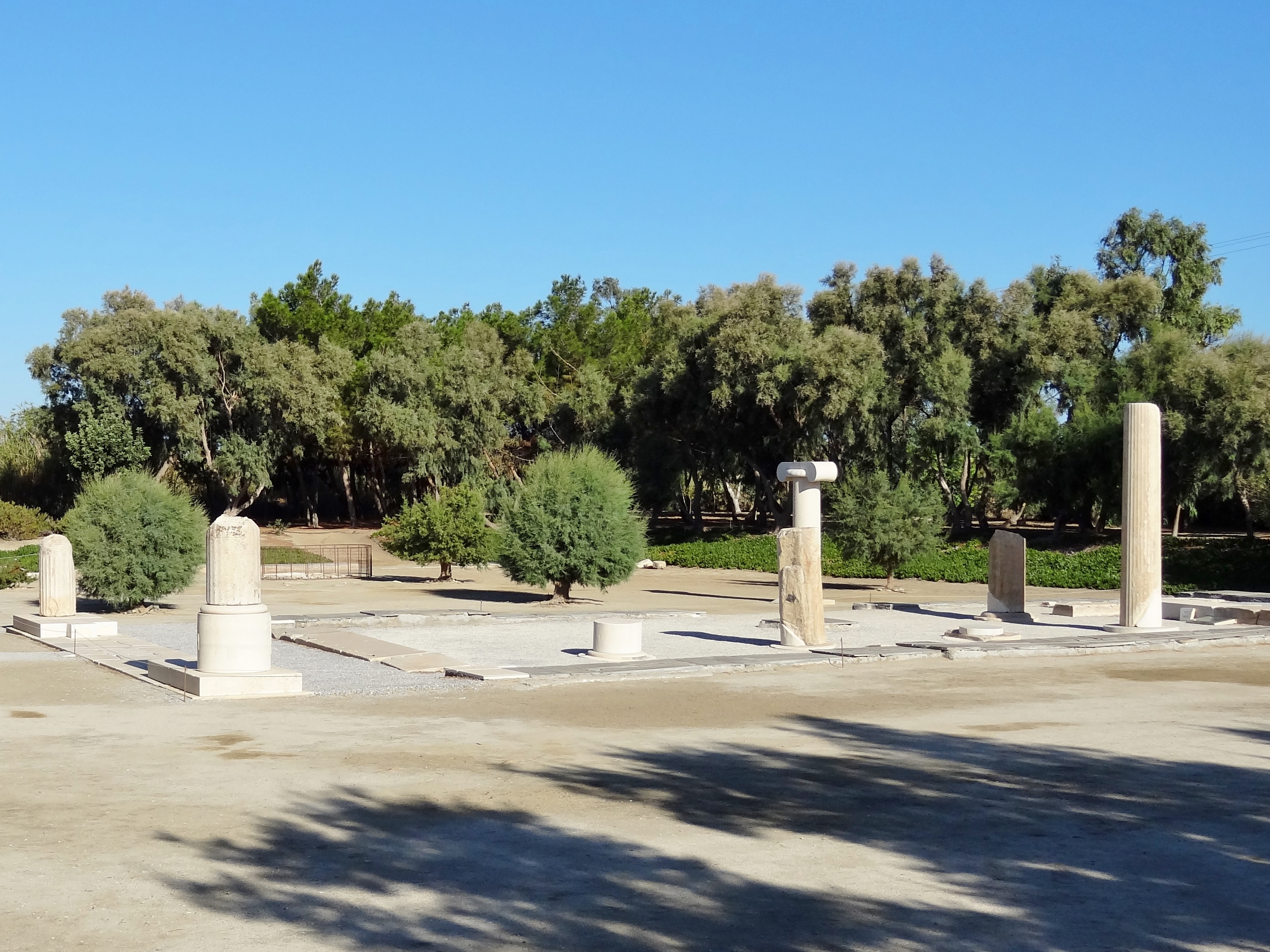
Sanctuary of Dionysus (Yria)

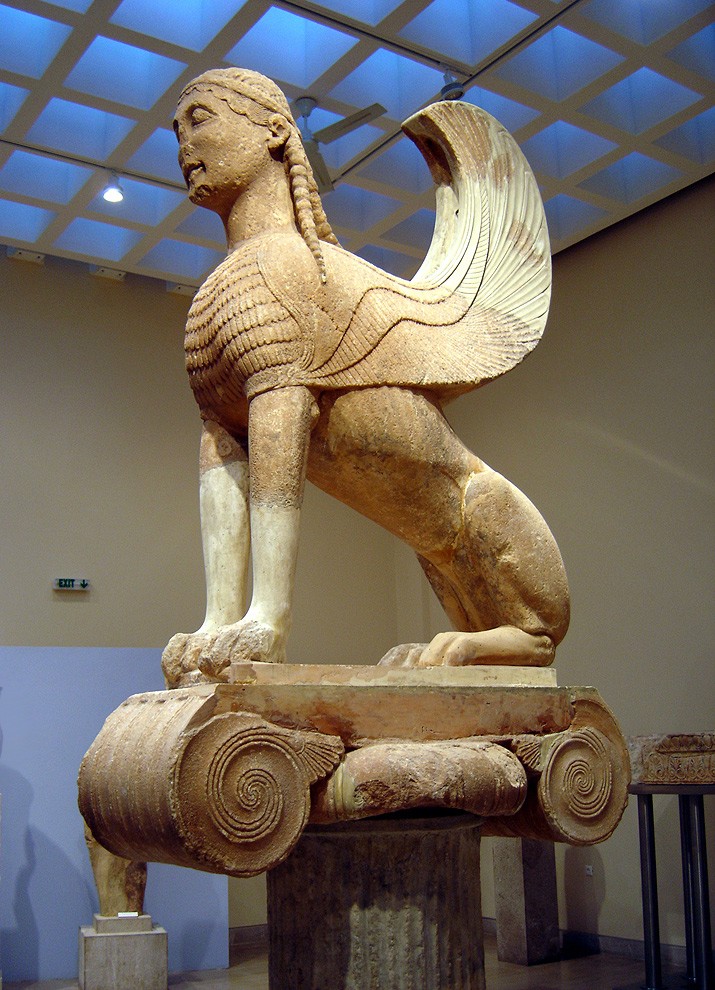
Sphinx of Naxos, now at Delphi Archaeological Museum

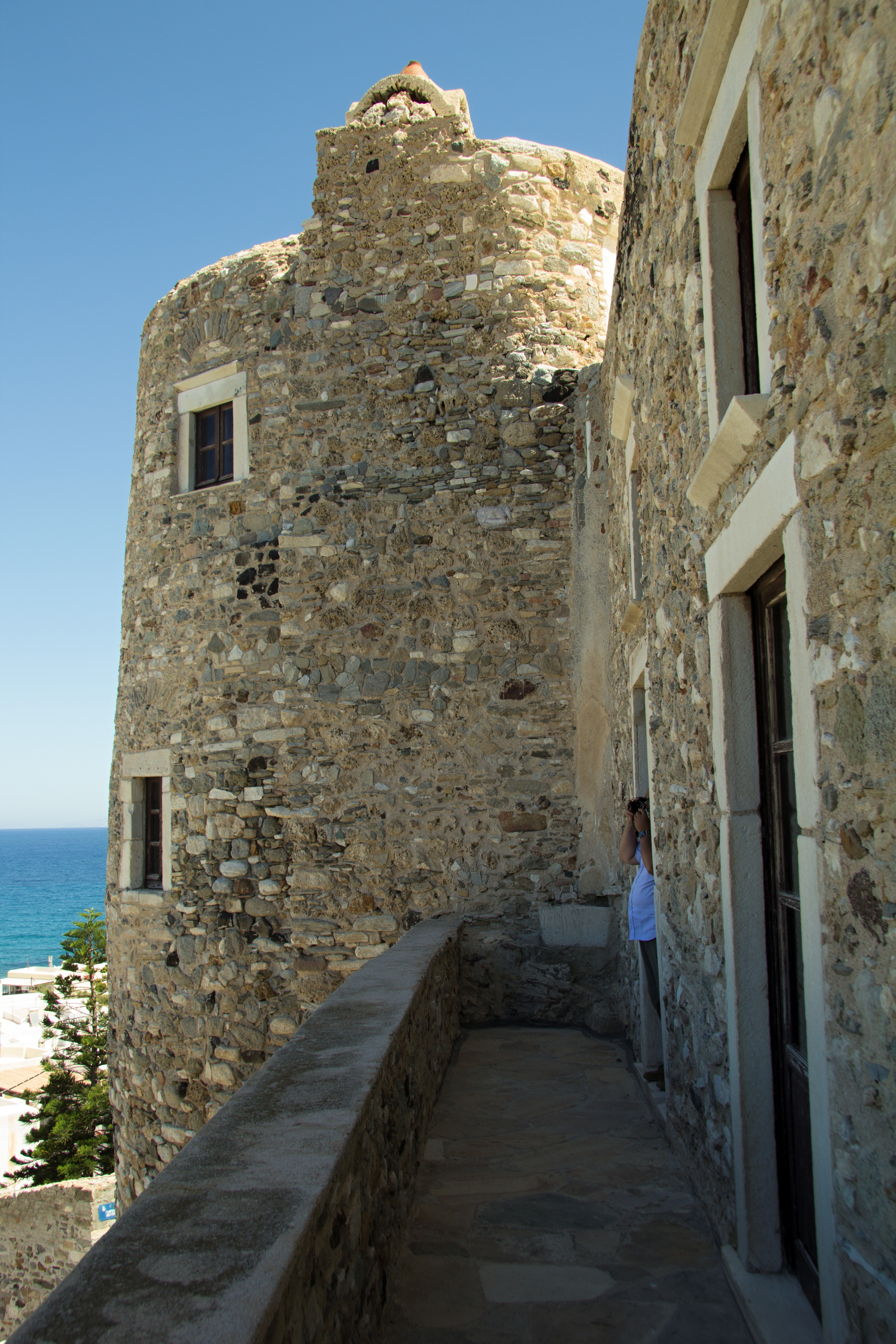
Crispi tower, housing the Byzantine museum

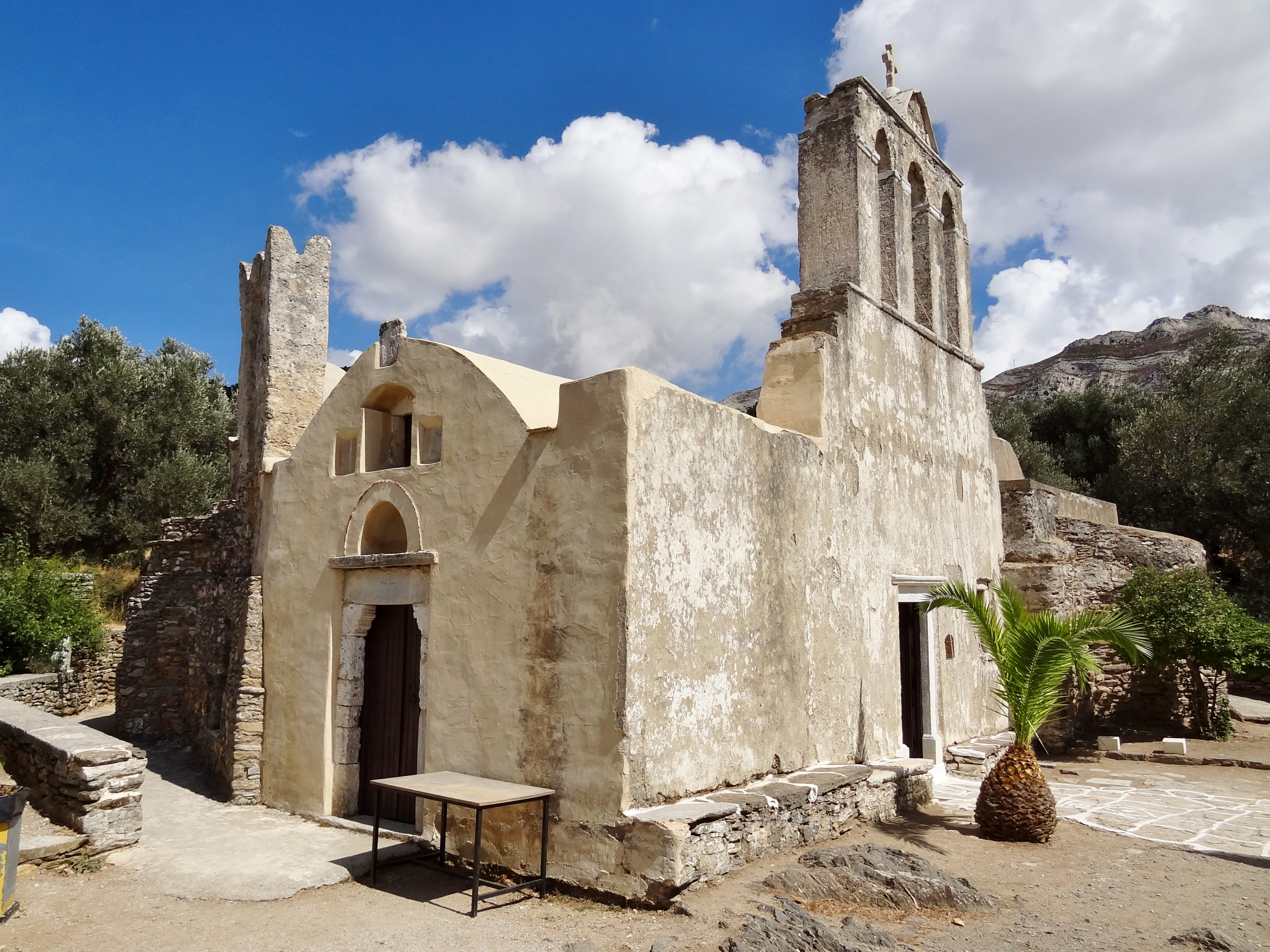
Panagia Drosiani church, Moni village

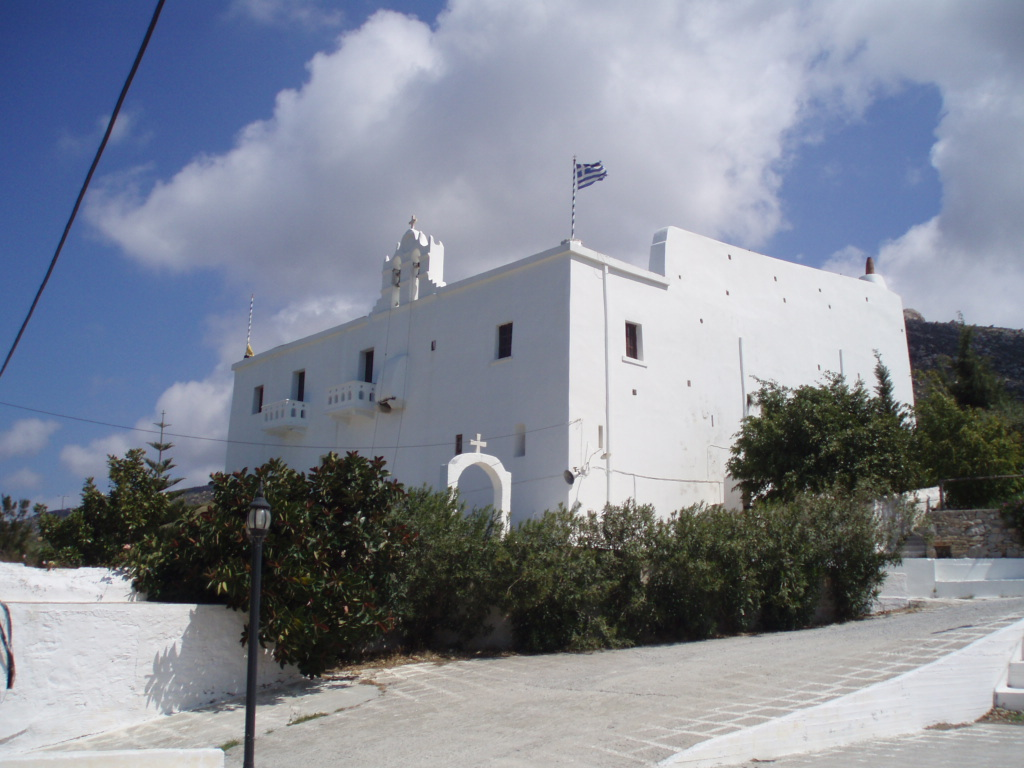
The monastery of Faneromeni

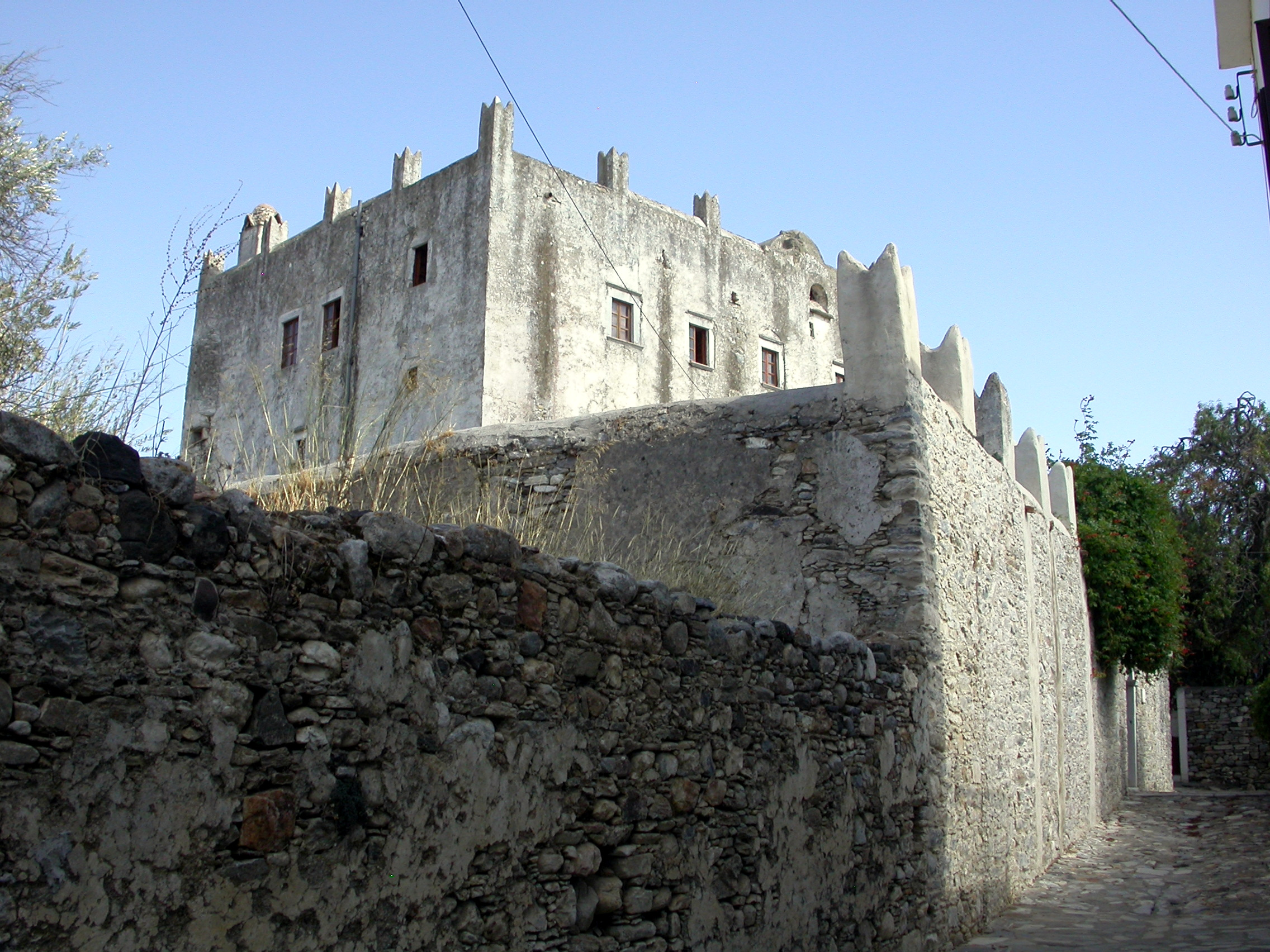
Chalki, Naxos

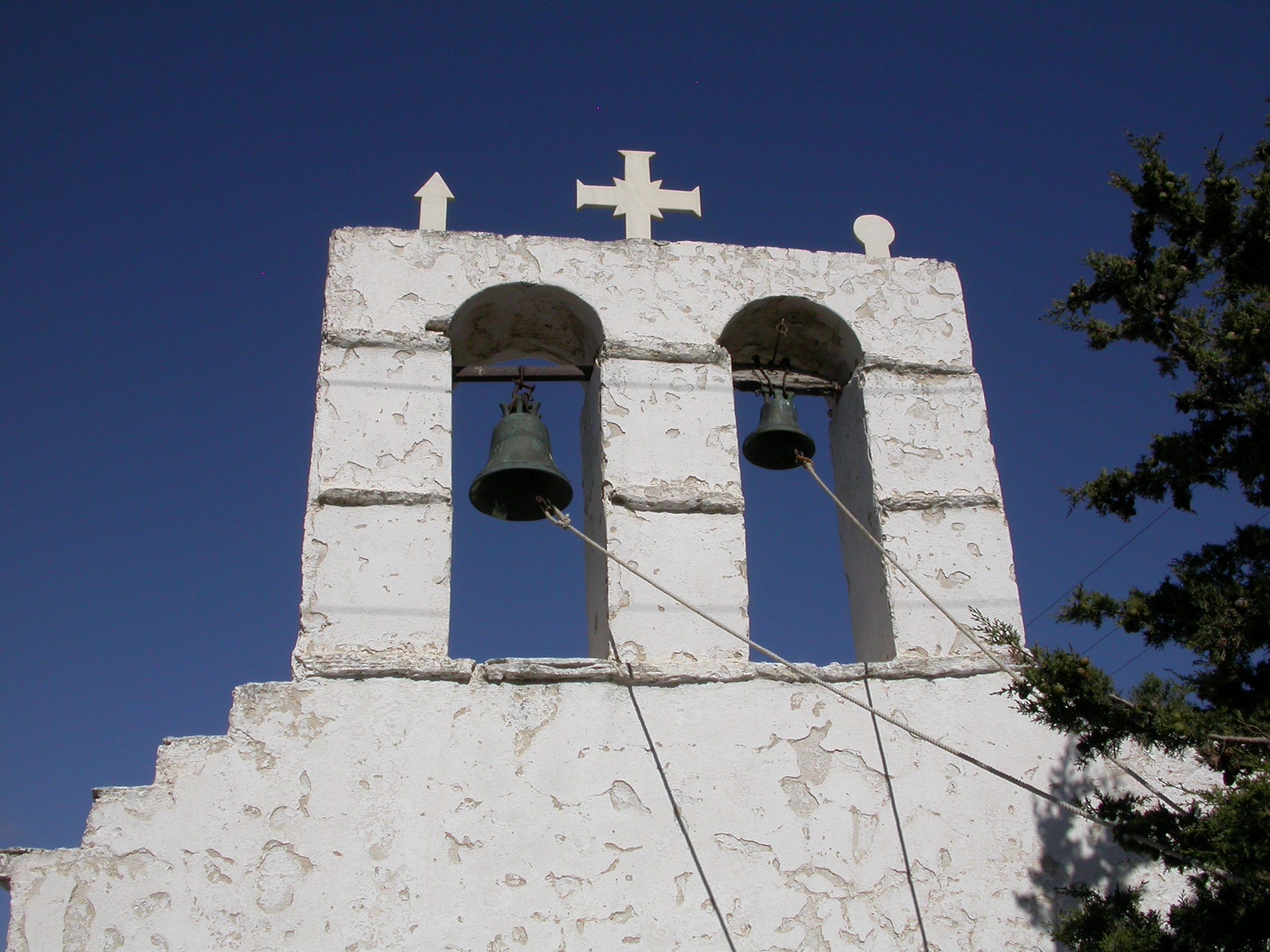
Agios Isidoros at Atsipapi

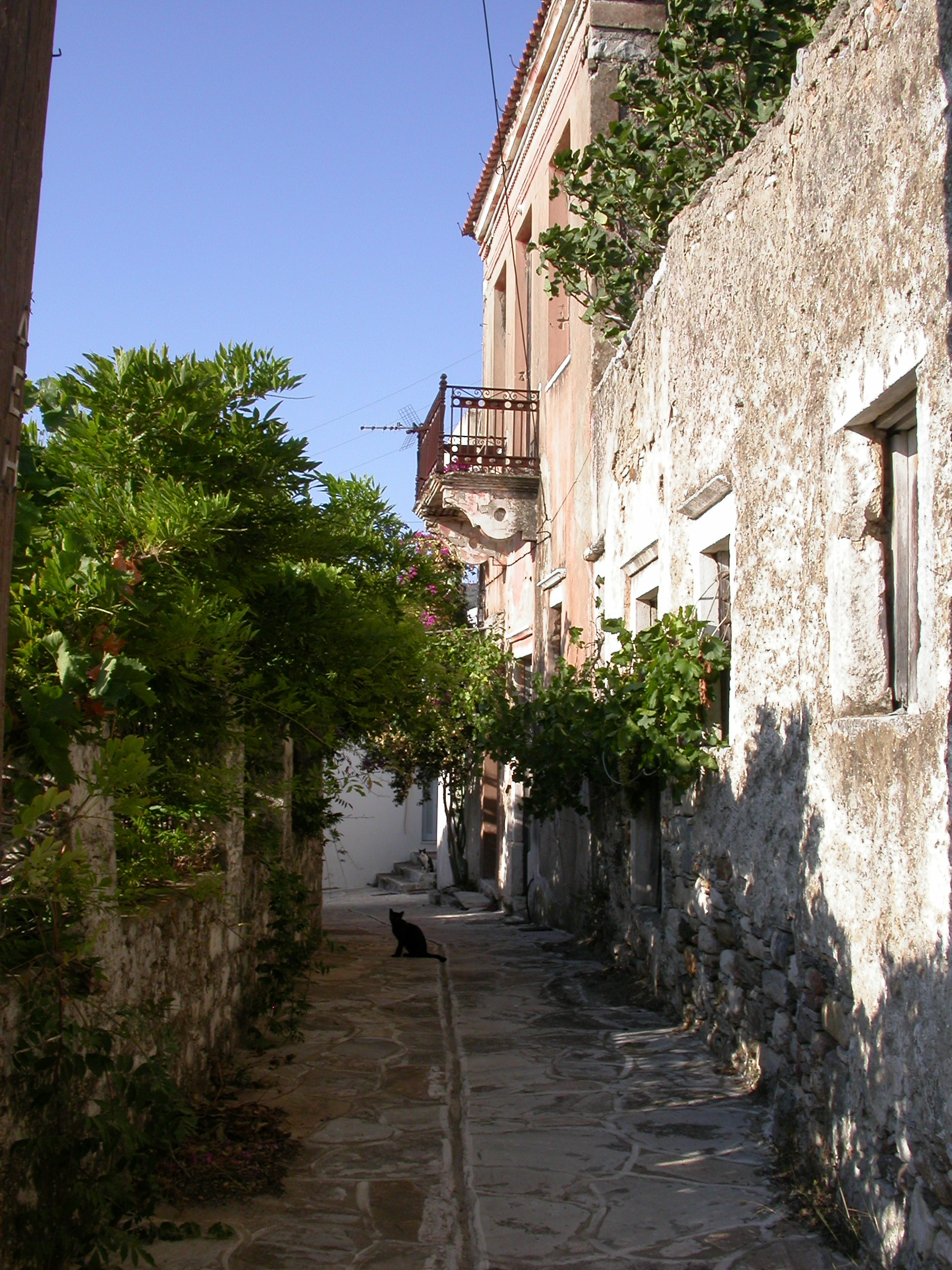
Kaloxilos, Naxos

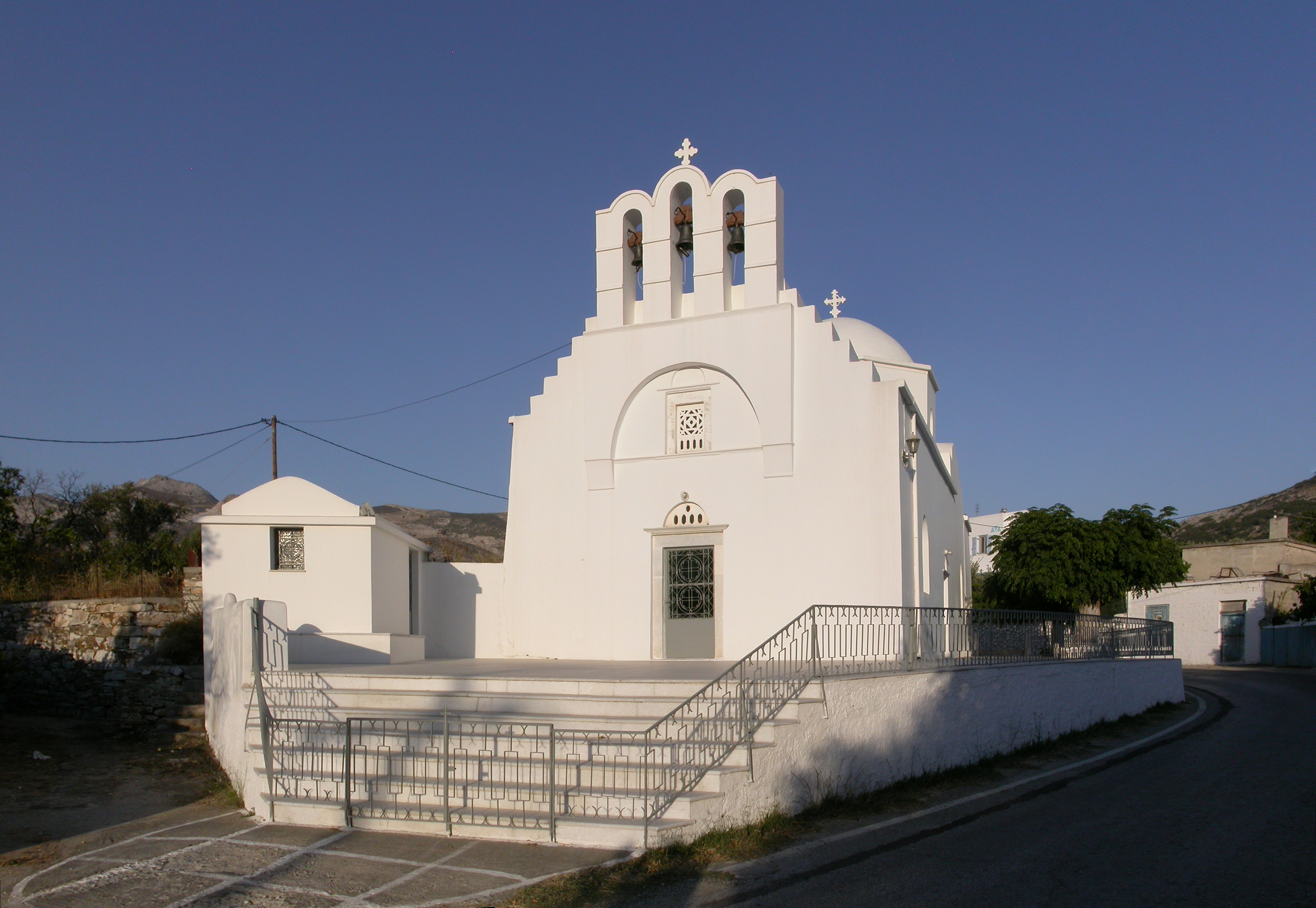
Vourvouria

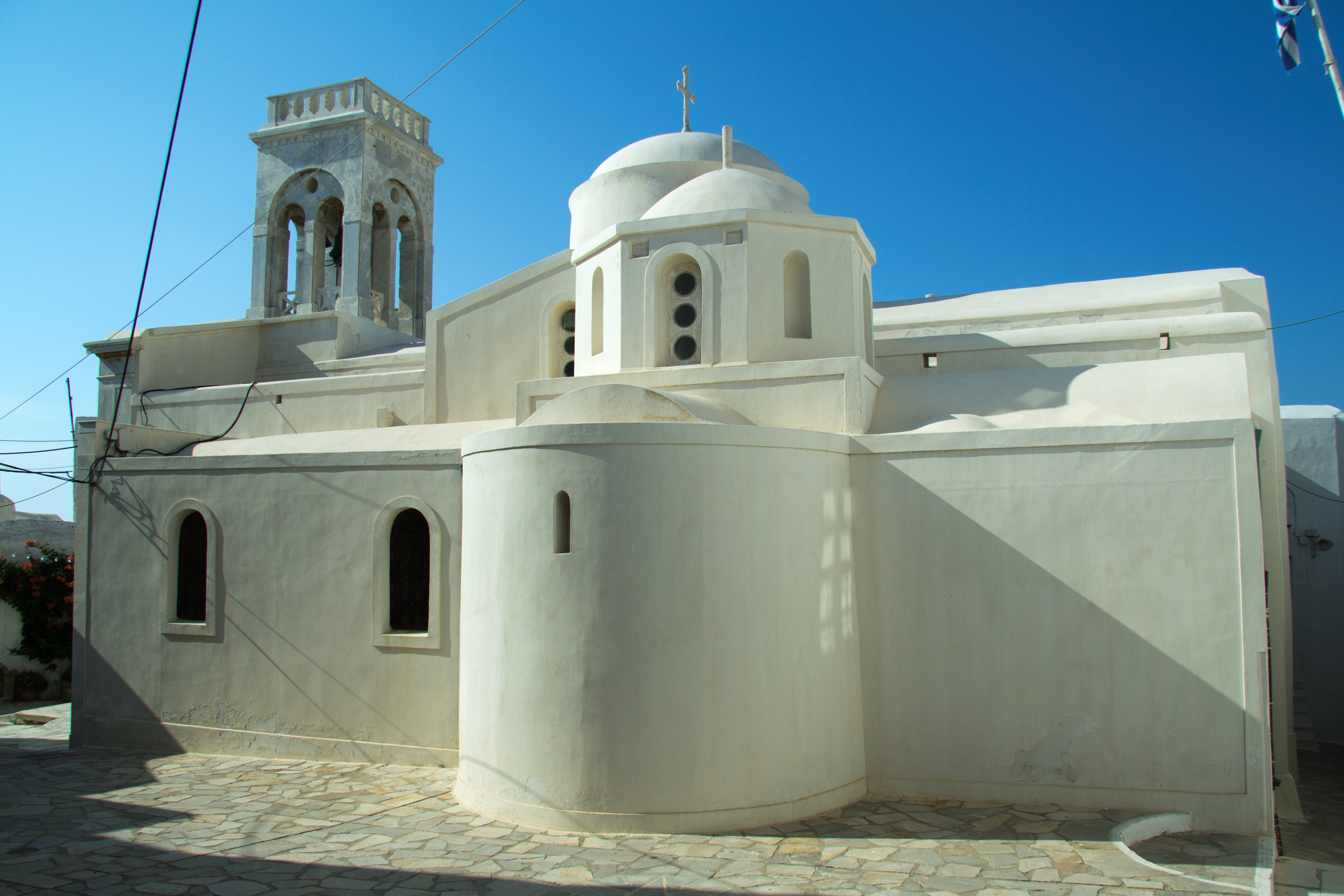
Presentation of the Lord Catholic church of Naxos

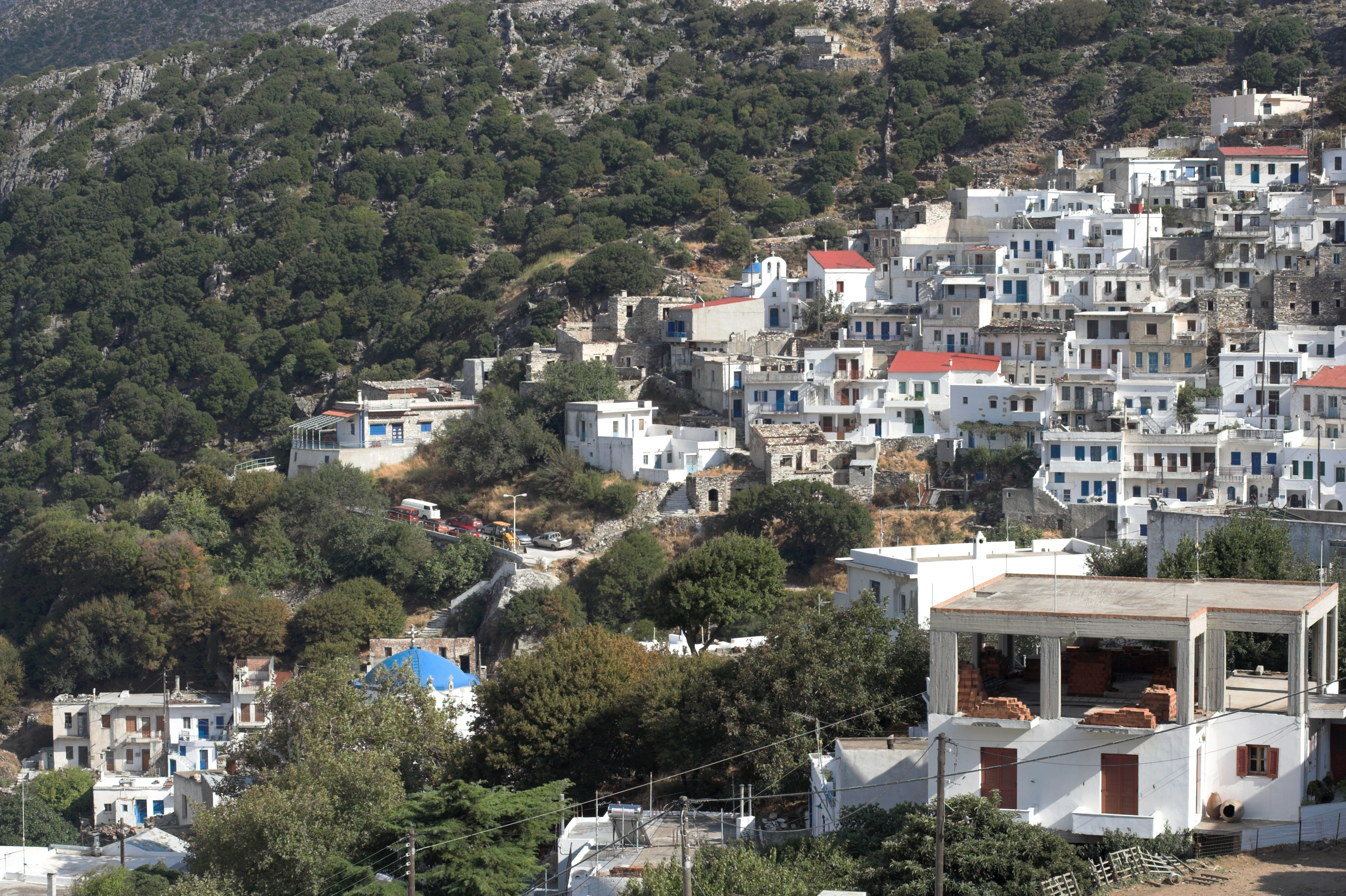
Koronos village

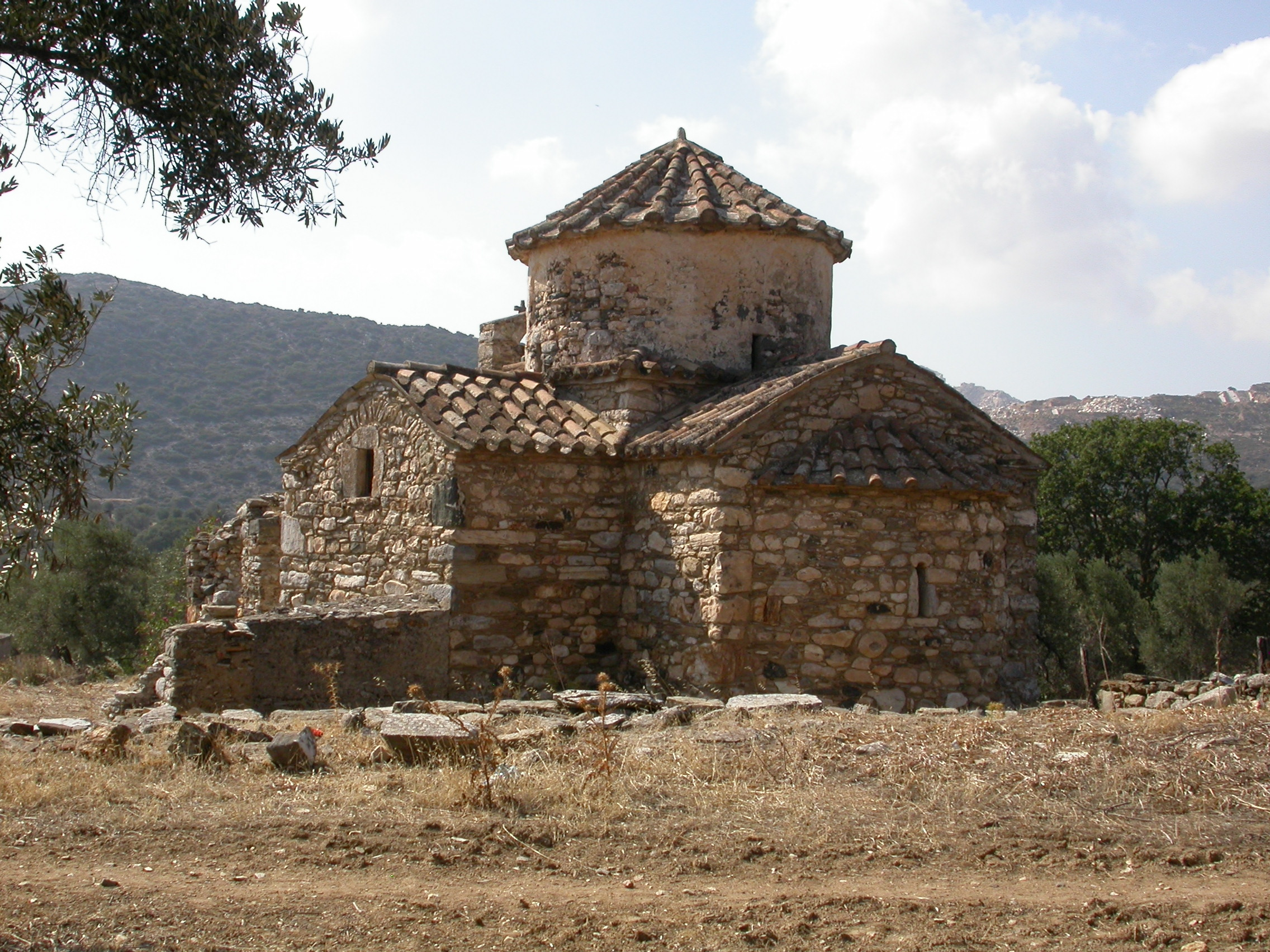
Panagia Damiotissa, Chalki

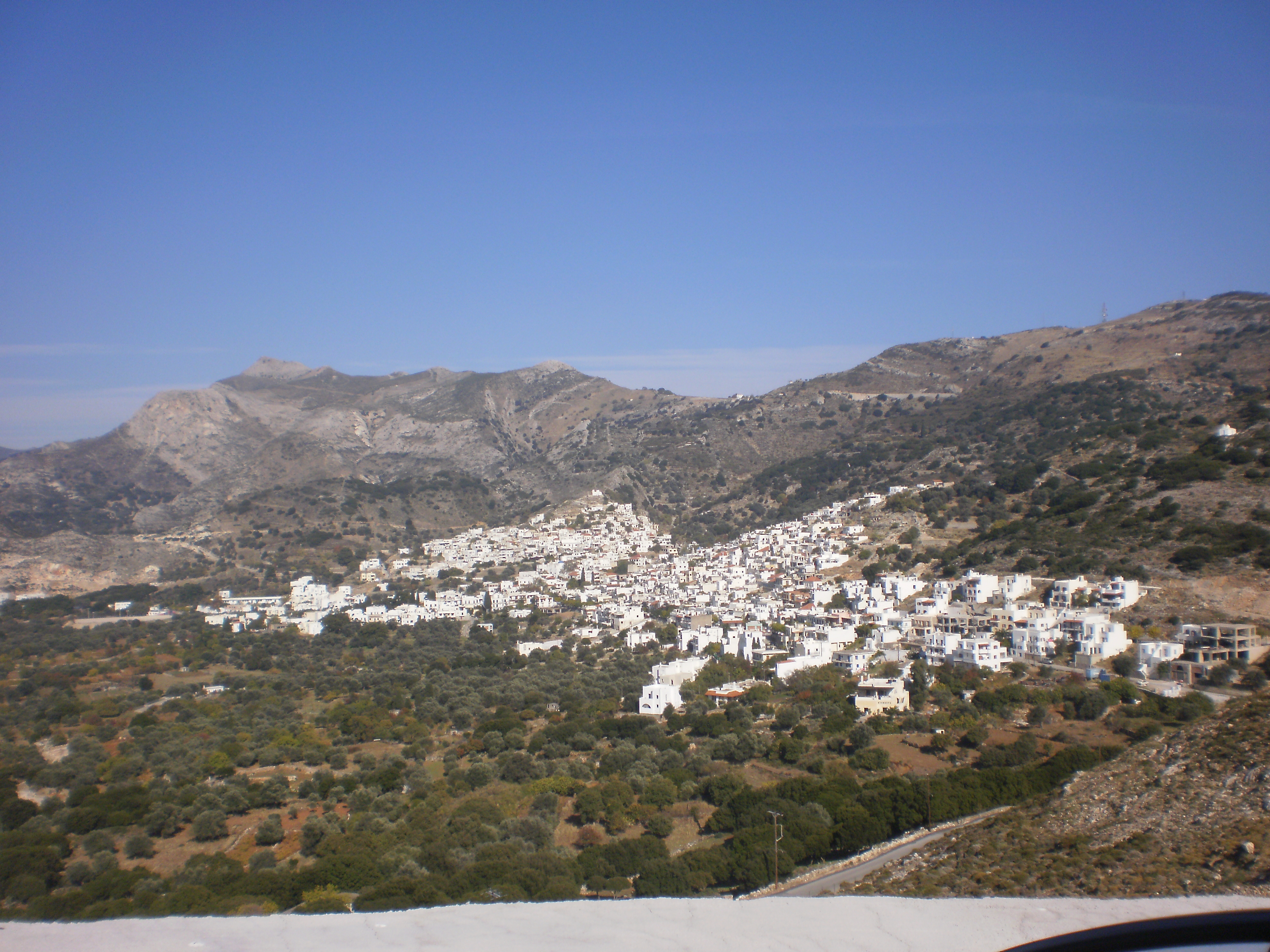
Filoti village

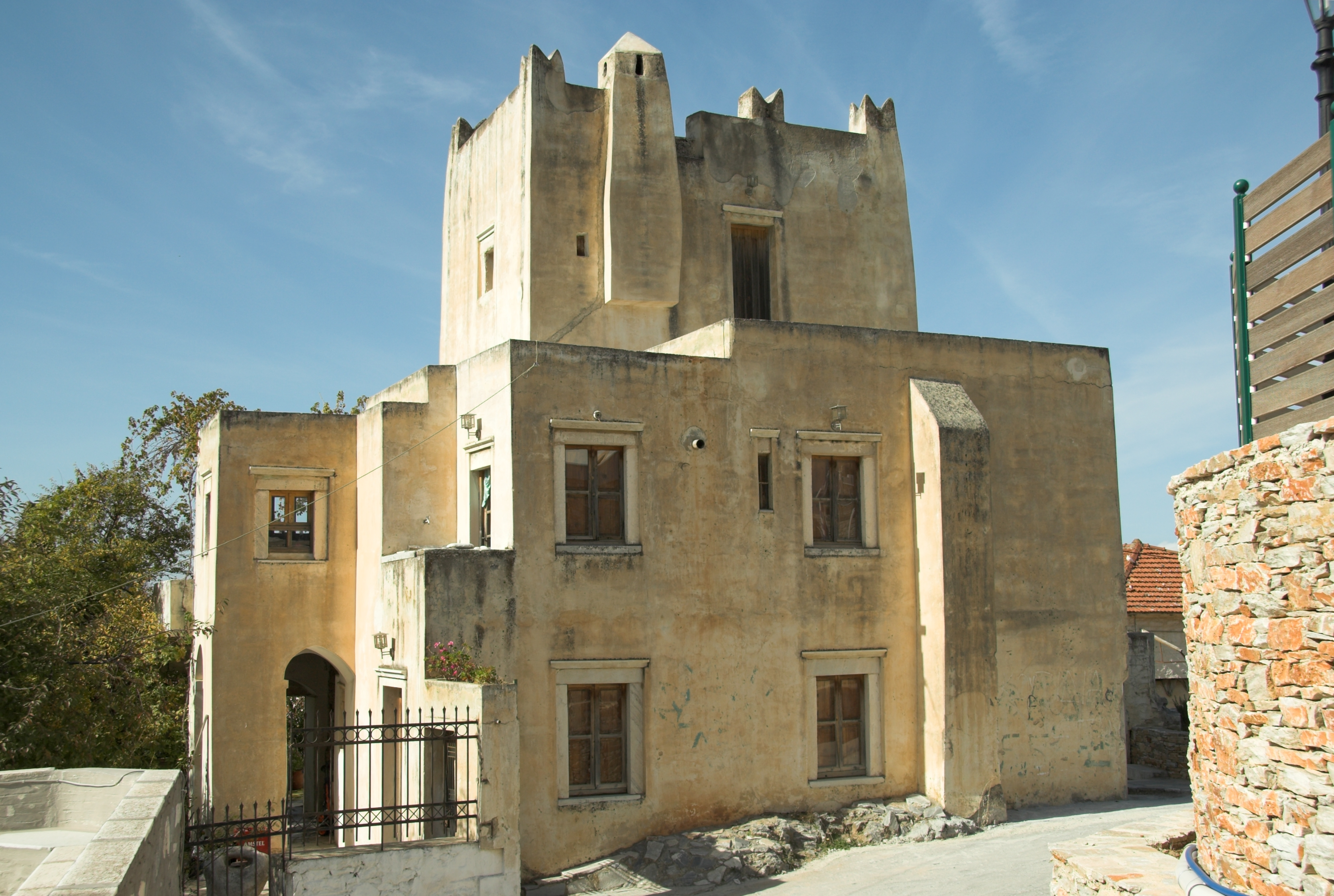
Tower in Filoti

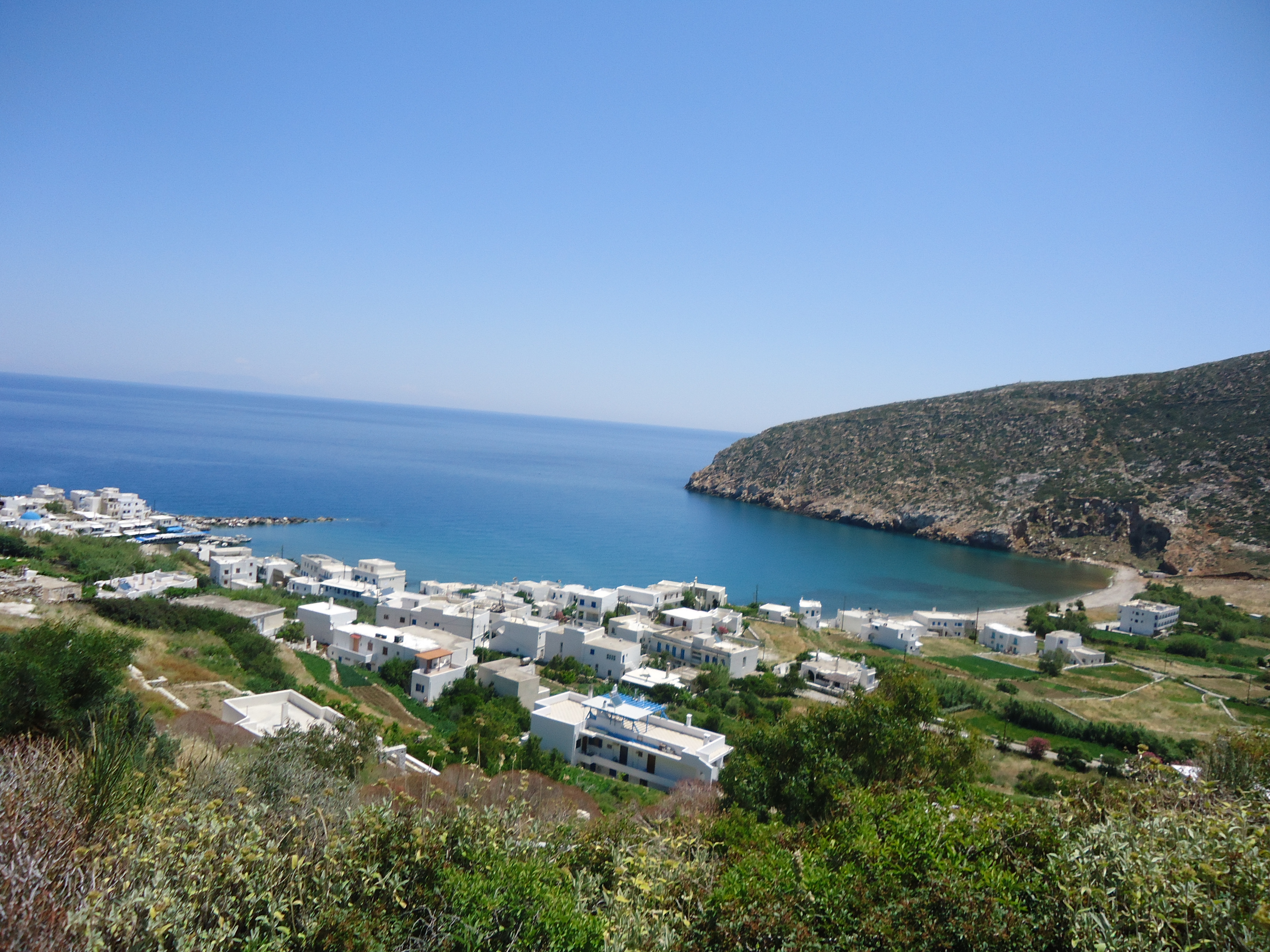
Apollonas village

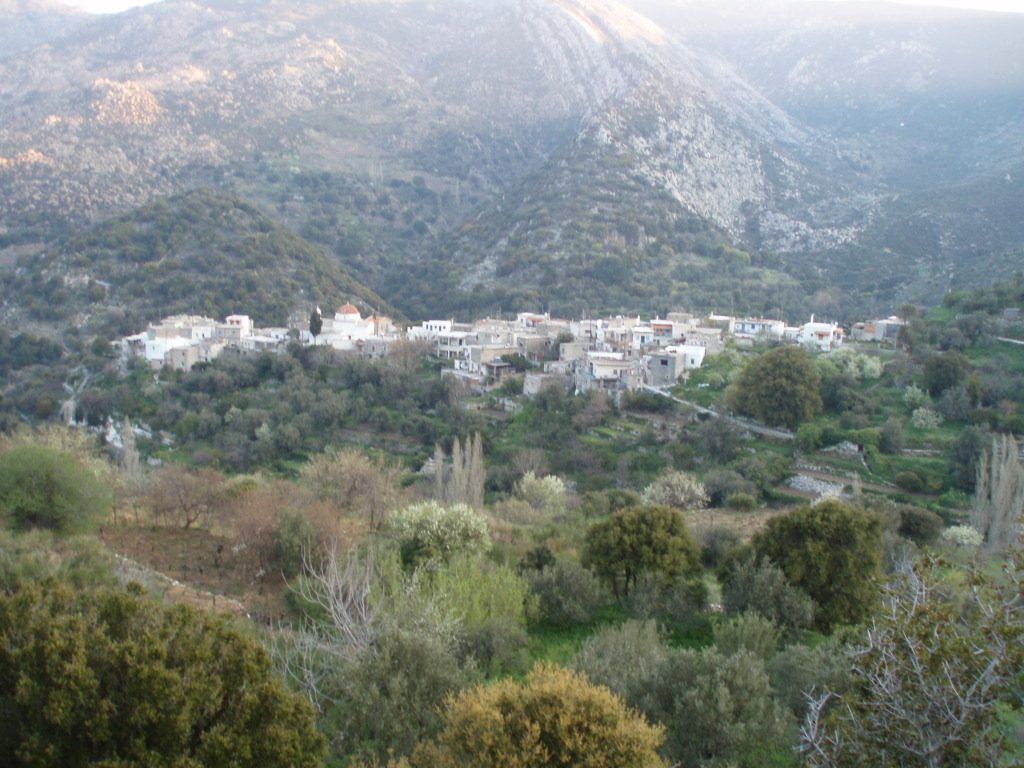
Keramoti village

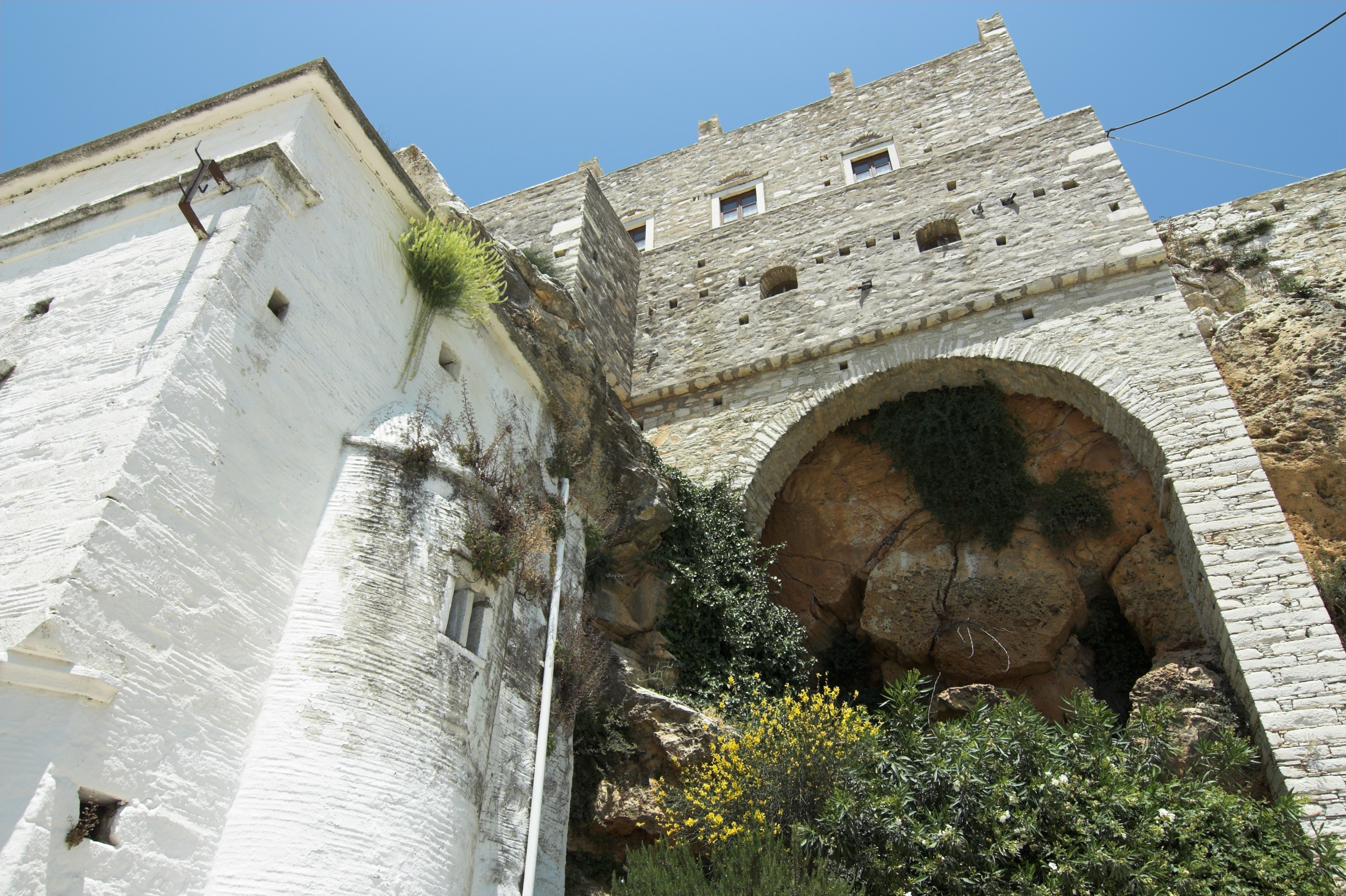
Tower in Apeiranthos

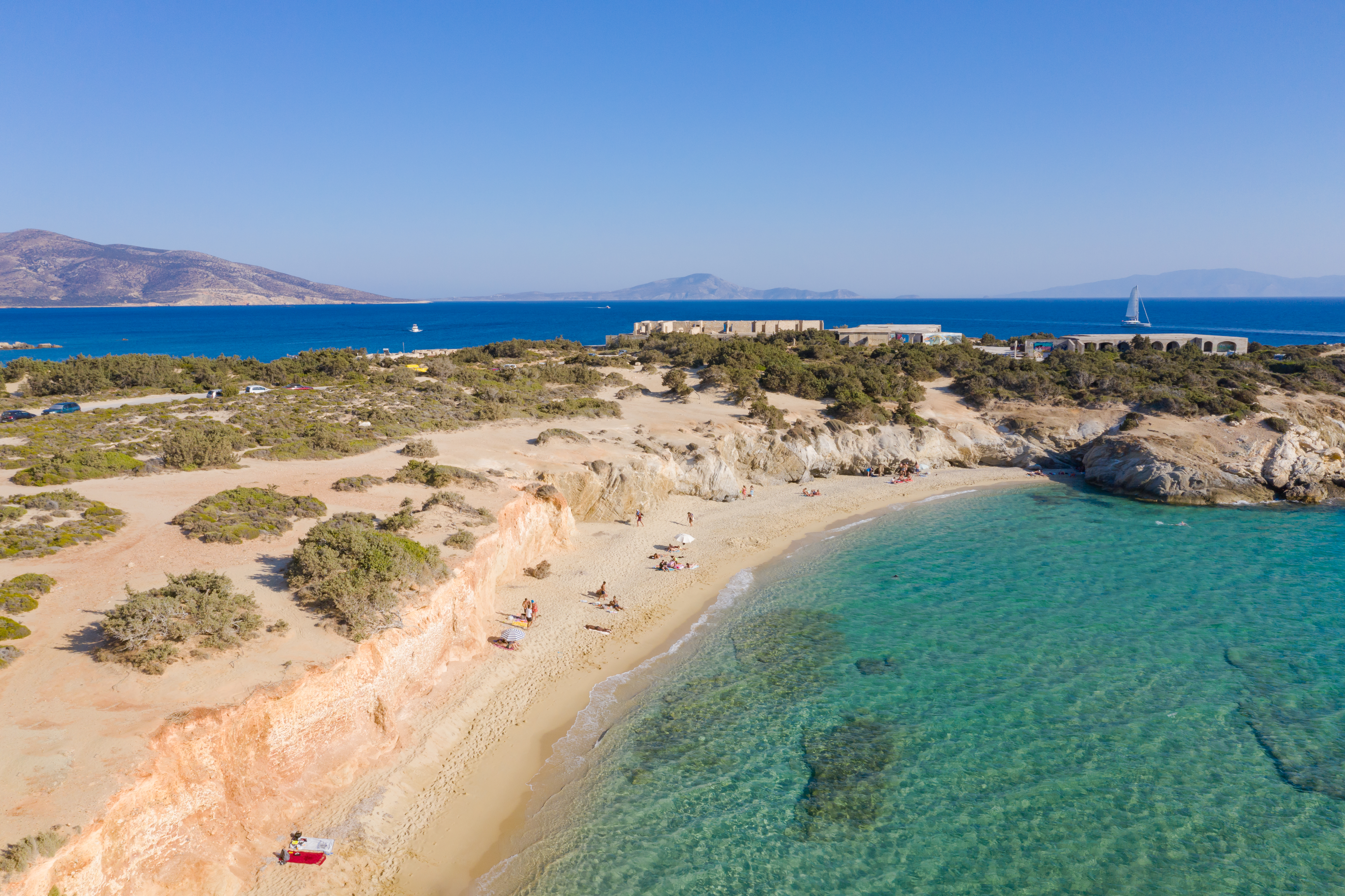
Hawaii beach, Alykos, Naxos

== See also ==
- Communities of the Cyclades
- Emery (rock), mined on Naxos
- Kitron
- Moutsouna

== General and cited references ==
- Agelarakis, A., "The Naxos Island Archaic Period Necropolis: Archaeological-Anthropology Research Report", Hellenic Antiquities Authority, Archival Report, 2005, Naxos.
- Ernst Curtius, Naxos. Ein Vortrag im wissenschaftlichen Verein zu Berlin 1846 gehalten, neu herausgegeben von Martin Biastoch, Göttingen, 2012.
