= Moutsouna =

Village in Greece

Coordinates: 37°04′40″N 25°35′08″E

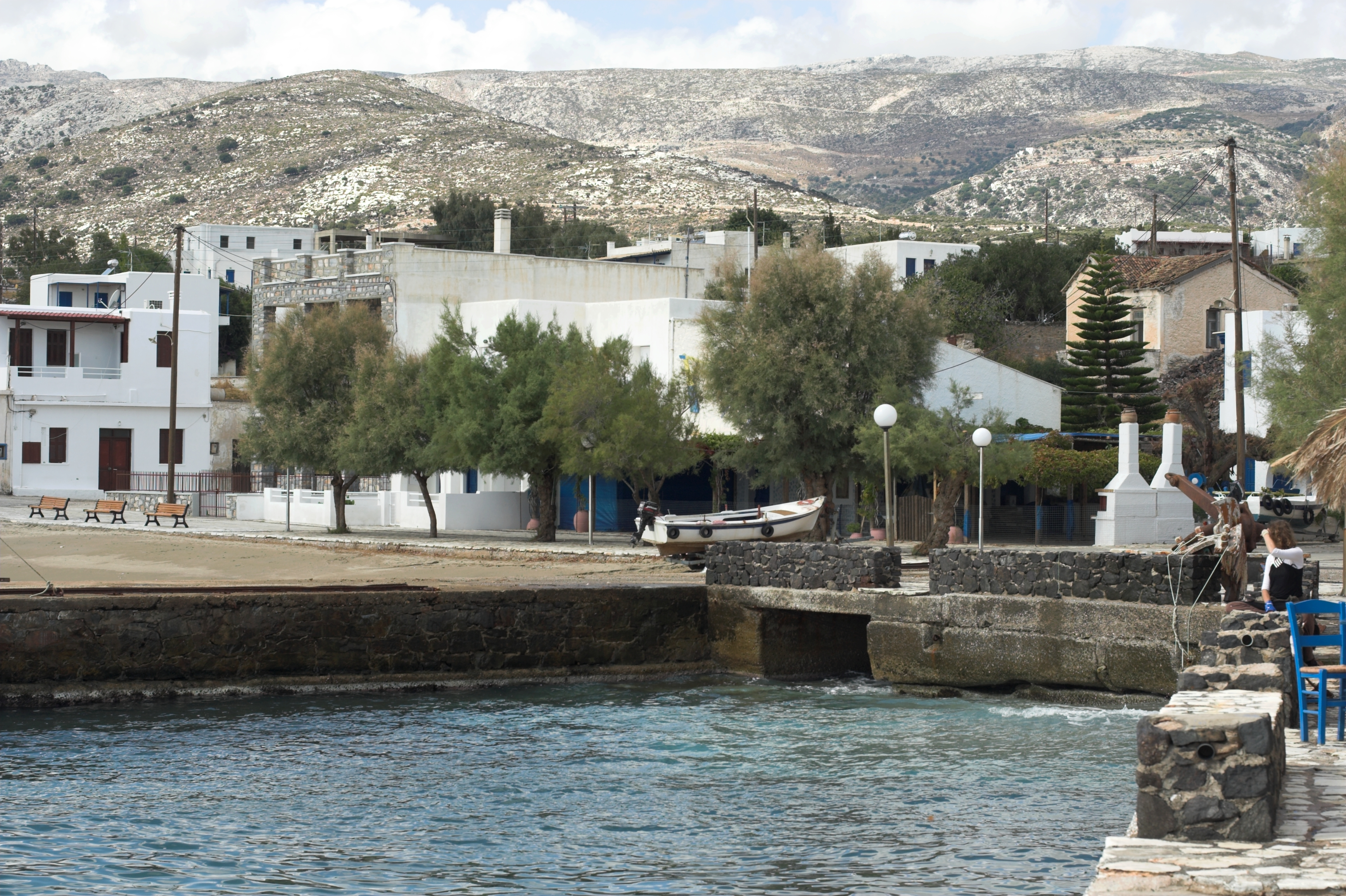
River in Naxos

Moutsouna (in Greek: Μουτσούνα) is a small seaside village on the eastern coast of the island of Naxos, Greece. It has a relatively open bay and limited port facilities. It is located approximately 39 km from the capital of the island, and 11 km from the village of Apiranthos. Moutsouna has its own football team (Moutsouna fc).

== History ==
Until the early 1980s, Moutsouna was the port from which emery (used as an abrasive) was loaded in boats and exported. The emery is mined up the mountain and was transported to the port by an aerial cableway. The cableway and the remains of the transfer station in Moutsouna can still be seen today.

Administratively it belongs to Apeiranthos with which it is connected by road.

In 1960 it had 65 inhabitants. At the last census there are 84 inhabitants.
