= Cave of Zas (Naxos) =

Cave on Naxos island, Greece

Coordinates: 37°02′06″N 25°29′55″E

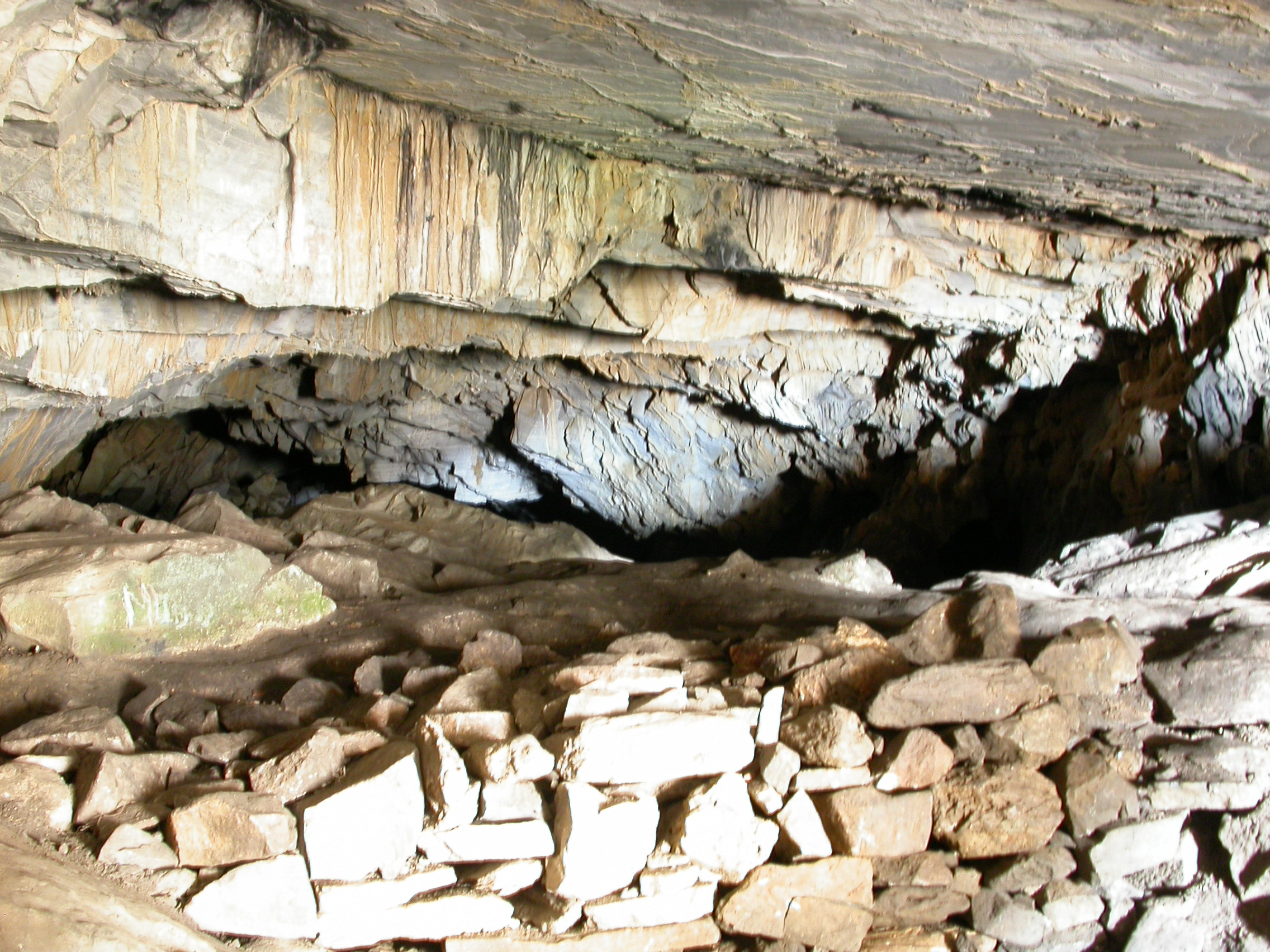
- Interior of the Cave of Zas
- Interactive map of Cave of Zas
- Location: Naxos, Greece

The Cave of Zas, or Cave of Zeus, is an ancient Greek cave located on Mount Zas on the island of Naxos. The cave was occupied from the Late Neolithic to Early Cycladic III periods.

Due to the lack of crop processing residue found, archaeologists suggest that the cave was not used for year-round settlement, but for herding animals during the driest period of the year. Excavations of the cave were carried out in 1985-1986 and 1994.

== Geography ==
The Cave of Zas is 630m above sea level and located southeast of Filoti, a village at the foot of the mountain. Large stalactites and stalagmites have been found inside the cave.

== In myth ==
In Agathosthenes' telling of the history of Naxos, Zeus spent his childhood in the cave, in hiding from his father, Cronus. A rock carving found near the cave reads "Zeus Melosios," referring to Zeus as the protector of the sheep.
