= Koronos =

Koronos Κόρωνος
- Community
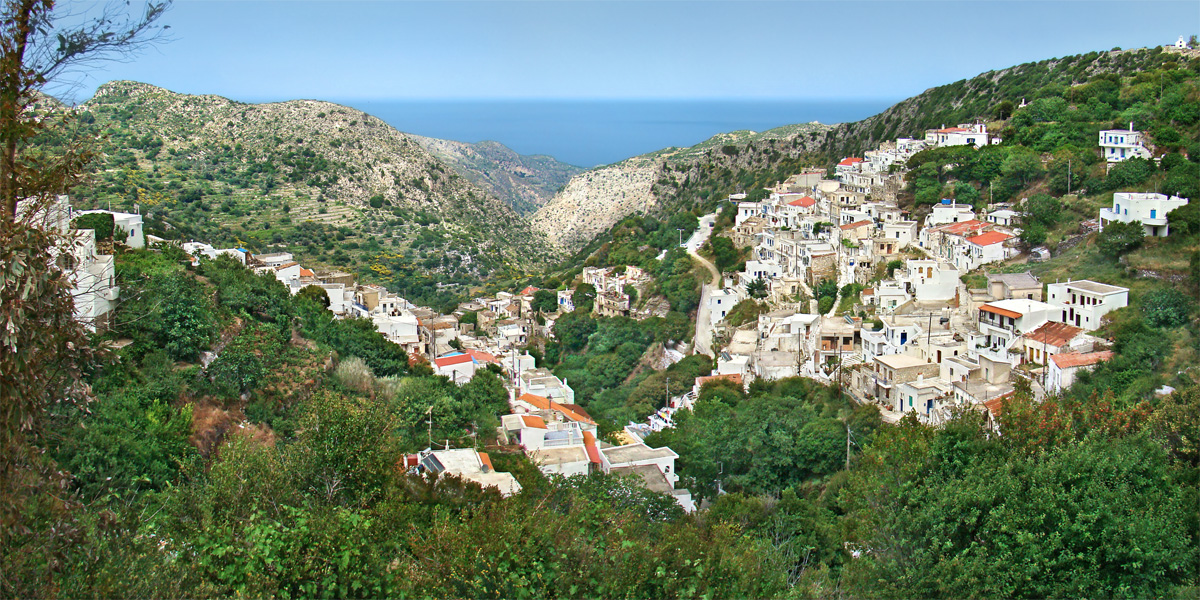

- Location within Greece
- Coordinates: 37°07′N 25°32′E
- Country: Greece
- Administrative region: South Aegean
- Regional unit: Naxos
- Municipality: Drymalia

Population (2021)
  - Community: 395
- Time zone: UTC+2 (EET)
  - Summer (DST): UTC+3 (EEST)

Koronos (Greek:(η) Κόρωνος) is one of the mountain villages on the Greek island of Naxos in the Cyclades group of islands. Situated in the northeast part of the island, Koronos lies on the northeast slopes of the Koronion Oros, the second tallest mountain on the island and has the second highest altitude of the villages at 630 meters above sea level. Along with Apeiranthos (T'aperathou) and Keramoti, Koronos belongs to the Smiridohoria or the emery-producing villages of Naxos.
