= Michalis Vardanis =

Greek military officer and lawyer

Lieutenant General (ret.) Michalis Vardanis
- Native name: Μιχάλης Βαρδάνης
- Nickname: "Red Ilarch"
- Born: c. 1936 Apeiranthos, Naxos, Kingdom of Greece
- Died: 14 January 2014 Third Hellenic Republic
- Allegiance: Kingdom of Greece
- Branch: Hellenic Army
- Rank: Lieutenant General
- Alma mater: Hellenic Military Academy; National and Kapodistrian University of Athens

Michalis Vardanis (Greek: Μιχάλης Βαρδάνης; 1936 – 14 January 2014) was a Hellenic Army officer, a lawyer and a major figure in the resistance against the Regime of the Colonels.

== Life ==
Michalis Vardanis was born in the village of Apeiranthos on the Aegean island of Naxos in 1936. He entered the Hellenic Military Academy, from where he graduated in 1958 with the rank of second lieutenant. Already during his days in the academy, he became known for his pro-leftist views, an unusual—and dangerous—stance for an officer following the Greek Civil War. At the time of the colonels' coup d'état of 21 April 1967, Vardanis was serving as a captain of in a tank unit in Polygyros. Following the establishment of the military regime, he became privy, through his regimental commander, of the plans for the counter-coup by King Constantine II and the monarchist Army leadership. Already before the—ultimately unsuccessful—royal counter-coup broke out, however, his activity aroused suspicion and was betrayed to the Army intelligence, so that on 26 October 1967 Vardanis was dismissed from the Army.

Vardanis then enrolled in the Athens University Law School, and after receiving his degree worked for a few years as a lawyer. At the same time, he became active in almost every resistance group established among those in the officer corps who were ready to oppose the regime: thus he participated in Colonel Dimitrios Opropoulos' Free Greeks group, and in Wing Commander Tasos Minis' A-A-A group, for which he was arrested on 22 April 1972, along with Minis. Released, he was re-arrested in September of the same year for his membership in the Free Greeks. Despite torture by the Greek Military Police (EAT-ESA), he did not confess, and was released on 16 December. Soon after that, he became privy to the plans for a major mutiny by the Navy, through another dismissed Army officer, Spyros Moustaklis. After the Navy mutiny was betrayed and the abortive coup was pre-empted by the junta on 25 May 1973, Vardanis was again arrested on 1 June. He was held along with Moustaklis in strict isolation for the next three months and again tortured by EAT-ESA—Moustaklis remained crippled as a result—until the general amnesty proclaimed on 24 August 1973 by the dictator Georgios Papadopoulos in his effort to usher in a guided transition to democratic rule.

Following the fall of the junta in 1974, he was among the signatories in the founding declaration of the Panhellenic Socialist Movement, and served as a prosecution witness in the Junta Trials. In 1976 he was rehabilitated and allowed to resume his career in the Army, where he continued to serve until 1990, reaching the rank of Major General (Lieutenant General in retirement). Following his retirement, he became active in the ranks of the Communist Party of Greece, and from 1995 until 2005 was chairman of the Society of the Imprisoned and Exiled Resistance Members 1967–74.
