= I Avgi =

Greek newspaper

- Type: Weekly newspaper
- Owner(s): Avgi S.A.
- Founded: 1952
- Political alignment: Left-wing; Pro-Syriza
- Language: Greek
- Headquarters: Ag. Konstantinou 12, 10431
- City: Athens
- Country: Greece
- Website: www.avgi.gr

I Avgi (Greek: Η Αυγή, lit. '"The Dawn"', pronounced [i avˈʝi]) is a daily newspaper published in Athens, Greece. It is called the "Morning newspaper of the Left" and is politically affiliated with Syriza.

It was first published in 1952. Manolis Glezos was for years its editor. During the seven-year period (1967–1974) of the Greek military junta, the newspaper stopped its publication which continued after the reinstatement of democracy.

In June 2024, the newspaper announced it will suspend its daily print edition and now only publish weekly on Sundays. In response, several unions called for a 24-hour strike to protest the decision.

== See also ==
- Politics of Greece
- List of newspapers in Greece
