= Manolis Glezos =

Greek journalist, politician, and folk hero (1922–2020)

- Μανώλης Γλέζος
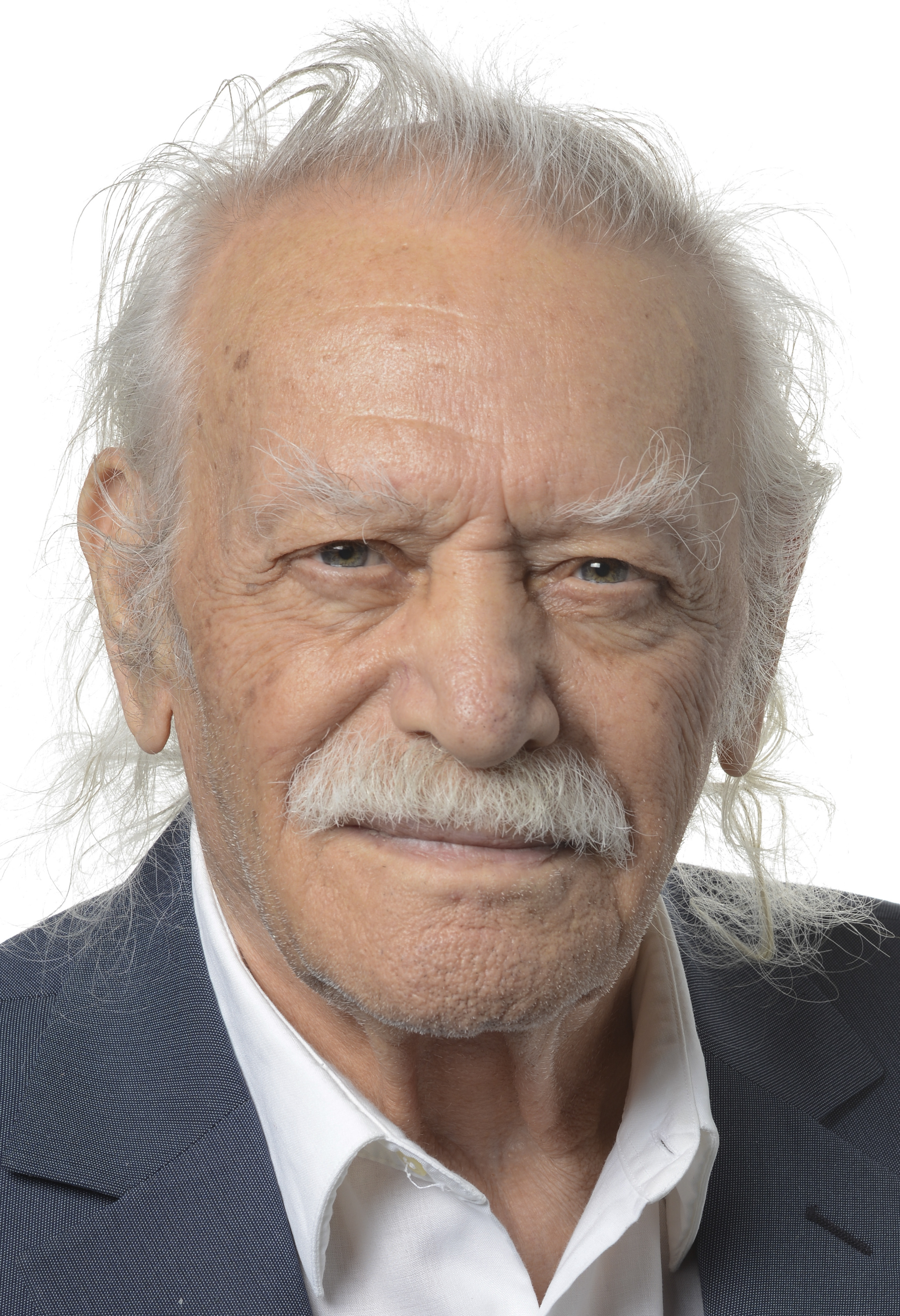

Member of the European Parliament for Greece
- In office 1 July 2014 – 8 July 2015 (resigned)
- Succeeded by: Nikolaos Chountis
- In office 24 July 1984 – 25 January 1985 (resigned)
- Succeeded by: Spiridon Kolokotronis

Member of the Hellenic Parliament for National list
- In office 6 May 2012 – 2 May 2014 (resigned)

Member of the Hellenic Parliament for Piraeus B
- In office 17 June 1985 – 31 December 1986 (resigned)

Member of the Hellenic Parliament for Athens A
- In office 18 October 1981 – 7 May 1985
- In office 9 September 1951 – 16 November 1952

President of United Democratic Left
- In office 25 January 1985 – 1989
- Preceded by: Ilias Iliou
- Succeeded by: Andreas Lentakis

General Secretary of United Democratic Left
- In office 1981 – 25 January 1985
- Succeeded by: Theodoros Katrivanos

President of the Community of Apeiranthos
- In office 1 January 1987 – 31 December 1990

Prefectural Councillor of Athens-Piraeus super-prefecture
- In office 1 January 2003 – 31 December 2006

Municipal Councilor of the Municipality of Paros
- In office 1 January 2011 – 6 May 2012 (resigned)

Personal details
- Born: 9 September 1922 Apiranthos, Naxos, Kingdom of Greece
- Died: 30 March 2020 (aged 97) Athens, Hellenic Republic
- Resting place: First Cemetery of Athens
- Party: Popular Unity (2015–2020); Syriza (2012–2015); Synaspismos (1991–2012); PASOK (1981–1989); United Democratic Left (1974–1989); Communist Party of Greece (1941–1968)
- Spouses: Anastasia Kouka (m. 1947; died 1980) Georgia Argyropoulou (m. 1986)
- Children: 2
- Education: Higher School of Economic and Commercial Studies

Military service
- Allegiance: EAM
- Branch/service: OKNE; EPON
- Battles/wars: World War II; Greek Resistance

Manolis Glezos (Greek: Μανώλης Γλέζος; 9 September 1922 – 30 March 2020) was a Greek left-wing politician, journalist, author, and guerrilla fighter most famous for his role in the Greek Resistance during World War II. After the end of the war, Glezos became a journalist and edited the left-wing newspapers Rizospastis and I Avgi. As a politician, he was elected to the European Parliament twice (1984 and 2014) and served as a Member of the Greek Parliament (MP) at various points from 1951 to 2014, representing three constituencies. He also published six books.

During the Axis occupation of Greece, he and Lakis Santas took down the flag of Nazi Germany from the Acropolis. After the end of Axis occupation, his left-wing political beliefs and activism in the Greek People's Liberation Army (ELAS) led to him being sentenced to death three times; his imprisonments and legal troubles were often the topic of international interest, until his permanent release in 1971 ended over 15 years of non-continuous imprisonment and exile. He was originally a member of the Communist Party of Greece and the United Democratic Left (EDA), but left the former in 1968 after the invasion of Czechoslovakia.

After the restoration of democracy in 1974, Glezos resumed duties as a politician, becoming an MP for various left-wing parties, and most prominently was the leader of EDA from 1981 to 1989. From 1987 to 2012, he was elected to various local government posts throughout Greece and was a founding member of Synaspismos, before returning as an MP in the May and June 2012 elections. In 2014, at the age of 91 (as a candidate for Syriza), he became a Member of the European Parliament for the second time, making him the oldest-ever member of the European Parliament, and the most voted-for candidate in Greece, but resigned in 2015 and split from Syriza amidst negotiations for the third bailout programme during the Greek debt crisis to form Popular Unity (LAE), which unsuccessfully contested the September 2015 elections.

Glezos is often regarded as an icon of the Greek Resistance and was the recipient of various international awards throughout his seven-decade long political career. He was nicknamed "The First Partisan", after Charles de Gaulle had dubbed him "The first partisan of Europe".

== Early life and World War II ==
Born in the village of Apiranthos, Naxos, Glezos moved to Athens in 1935 together with his family, where he finished high school. During his high school years in Athens, he also worked as a pharmacy employee. He was admitted to the Higher School of Economic and Commercial Studies (known today as the Athens University of Economics and Business) in 1940. In 1939, still a high school student, Glezos participated in the creation of an anti-fascist youth organization against the Italian occupation of the Dodecanese and the dictatorship of Ioannis Metaxas. At the onset of World War II, he volunteered to join the Hellenic Army in the Albanian front against Fascist Italy but was rejected because he was underage. Instead, he worked as a volunteer for the Hellenic Ministry of Economics. During the Axis occupation of Greece, he worked for the Hellenic Red Cross and the municipality of Athens, while actively involved in the Greek Resistance.

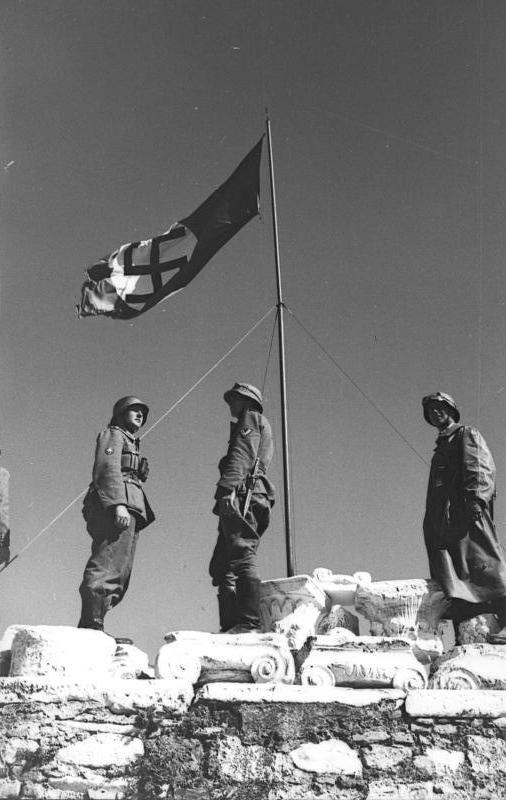
The Nazi German flag on the Acropolis during the Nazi occupation of Greece, May 1941

According to popular tradition, on 27 April 1941 Konstantinos Koukidis was ordered to lower the Greek flag and raise the Nazi German flag. Koukidis allegedly lowered the flag and jumped from the Acropolis holding it, rather than raise the Nazi flag. On 30 May 1941, Glezos and Apostolos Santas climbed on the Acropolis and tore down the Nazi German flag, which had been there since 27 April 1941, when the Nazi forces had entered Athens. It inspired not only the Greeks but all subjected peoples in Nazi-occupied Europe to resist the Axis powers, and established them both as two international anti-Nazi heroes.

Hours later, the Nazi regime sentenced the perpetrators to death, but they were not identified until much later. Glezos was arrested by the German occupation forces on 24 March 1942, imprisoned, and tortured. As a result of his treatment, he was affected by tuberculosis. Glezos was arrested again on 21 April 1943 by the Italian occupation forces and spent three months in jail. In 1944, he was imprisoned by Greek collaborators and beaten for trying to escape.

== Career and political activism ==
=== Post-war period ===
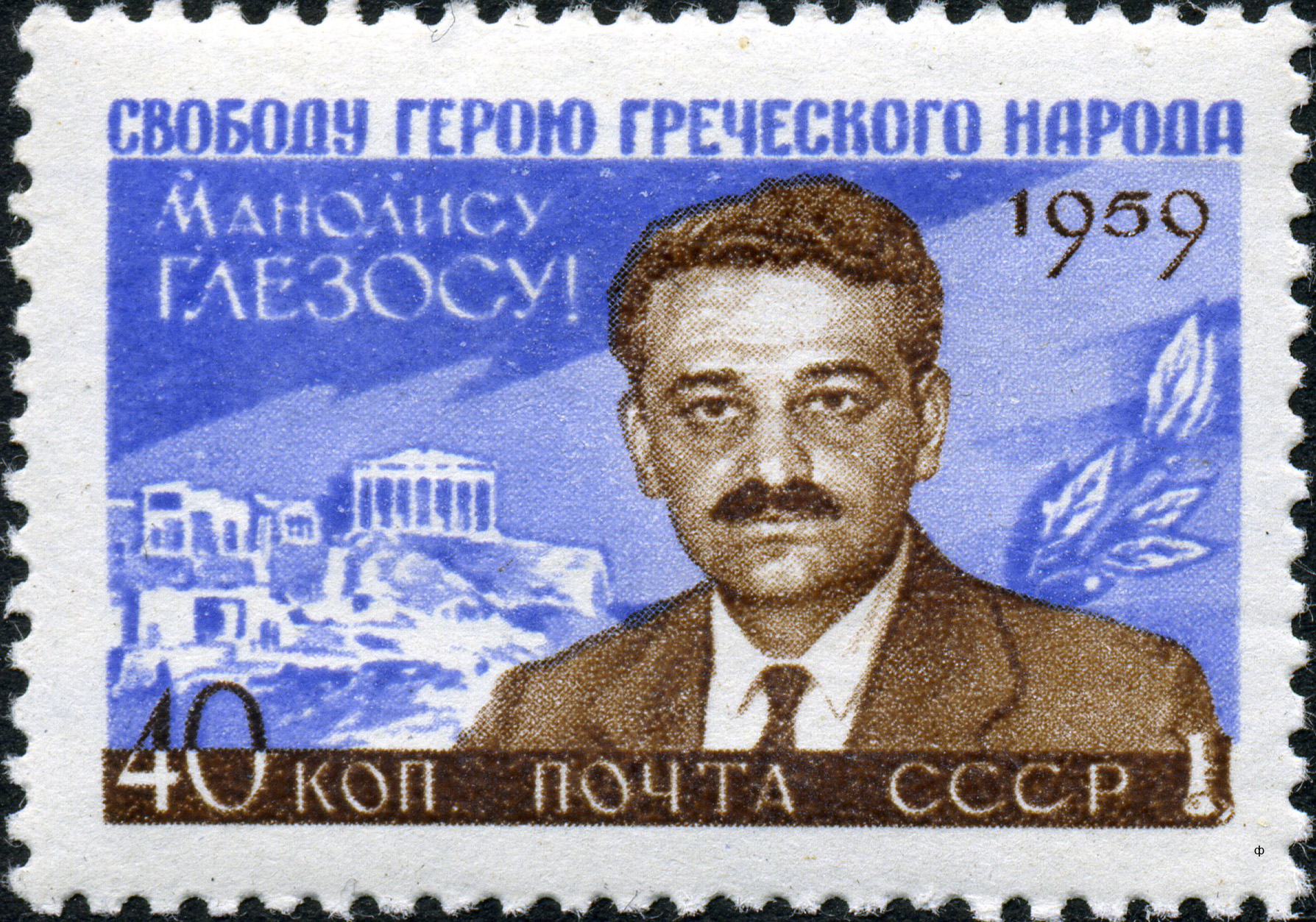
Glezos on a 1959 Soviet postage stamp

The end of World War II was not the end of Glezos' plight. On 3 March 1948, in the midst of the Greek Civil War, he was put to trial for his political convictions and sentenced to death multiple times by the national government. His death penalties were reduced to a life sentence in 1950. Even though he was still imprisoned, he was elected member of the Hellenic Parliament in 1951, under the flag of the United Democratic Left, also known as EDA (Ενιαία Δημοκρατική Αριστερά, ΕΔΑ). Upon his election, he went on a hunger strike demanding the release of his fellow EDA MPs that were imprisoned or exiled in the Greek islands. He ended his hunger strike upon the release of seven MPs from their exile. He was released from prison on 16 July 1954.

On 5 December 1958, he was arrested again and convicted of espionage, which was the common pretext for the persecution of the supporters of the left during the Cold War. The Soviet Union issued a postage stamp depicting Glezos, to which the Greek government responded with a postage stamp depicting Imre Nagy. His release on 15 December 1962 was a result of the public outcry in Greece and abroad, including winning the Lenin Peace Prize. During his second term of post-war political imprisonment, Glezos was reelected MP with EDA in 1961. During the coup d'état of 21 April 1967, Glezos was arrested at 2 am, together with the rest of the political leaders. During the Regime of the Colonels, the military dictatorship led by George Papadopoulos, he was imprisoned and exiled until his release in 1971. Glezos' sentences, from the Second World War to the Greek Civil War and the Regime of the Colonels total 11 years and 4 months of imprisonment, and 4 years and 6 months of exile.

=== Since 1974 ===
After the restoration of democracy in Greece in 1974, Glezos participated in the reviving of EDA. In the elections of October 1981 and June 1985, he was elected Member of the Greek Parliament, on a Panhellenic Socialist Movement (PASOK) ticket. In 1984 he was elected Member of the European Parliament, again on a PASOK ticket. He was the President of EDA from 1985 until 1989. In the meantime, in 1986, he withdrew from the Parliament, in order to try to implement a grassroots democracy experiment. He did so in the community of Aperathu, where he was elected as the President of the Community Council in 1986 elections. He then essentially abolished the privileges of the council, introducing a "constitution" and establishing a local assembly that had total control over the community administration. This model worked for several years, but in the long term the interest of the rest of his community wore off and the assembly was abandoned. Glezos remained the President until 1989.

In the 2000 Greek legislative election he led the list of Synaspismos (in English Coalition) party of the radical left. In 2002, he formed the political group Active Citizens (which is part of Coalition of the Radical Left, an alliance with Synaspismos and other minor parties of the Greek left) and he ran as a candidate prefect for Attica. In March 2010, Glezos was participating in a protest demonstration in Athens, when he was hit in the face by a police tear gas canister. He was carried away injured. In February 2012, Glezos was arrested by riot police while protesting in Athens. He was sprayed with tear gas by one of the police officers in that area. In the June 2012 parliamentary election, Glezos was elected as MP of the Coalition of Radical Left (SYRIZA) party.

Glezos was a SYRIZA candidate for the European Parliament in the elections of 25 May 2014. He was elected to the European Parliament with over 430,000 votes, more than any other candidate in Greece. At age 91, he was also the oldest person elected to the European Parliament in the 2014 election. In 2015, Glezos took a firm stance in favour of the "No" vote in the Greek bailout referendum. As an MEP he also participated in a support protest in Brussels, along with thousands of Belgians in favour of Greeks voting negatively in the referendum, a few days before the latter takes place. He resigned from his position in the European Parliament in July 2015, being succeeded by Nikolaos Chountis. The same year, he left SYRIZA before the September 2015 Greek election, where he was an MP candidate with the newly formed Popular Unity party.

In 2018, Glezos publicly voiced his opposition to the Prespa Agreement between Athens and Skopje on the resolution of the Macedonia naming dispute -despite the agreement being promoted by the SYRIZA government party which he formerly supported. In an article for the Greek daily paper Kathimerini, he insisted that the people of the neighbouring country should "define themselves in accordance with their history, language, traditions... taking out of their mind the word Macedonia".

== Non-political career ==
Apart from his political work, Glezos invented a system to prevent floods, combat erosion and preserve underground water, that works by the constructions of a series of very small dams that redirect water to aquifers. For his contributions to democracy, to geological sciences, and to linguistics he was pronounced honorary Doctor of Philosophy of the University of Patras (Department of Geology) in 1996, of the Aristotle University of Thessaloniki (Department of Civil Engineering) in 2001, of the National Technical University of Athens (School of Mining & Metallurgical Engineering) in 2003, and of the National and Kapodistrian University of Athens (School of Philosophy) in 2008.

== Death ==
On 30 March 2020, Glezos died of heart failure, at the age of 97. Alexis Tsipras, former Greek prime-minister, said, "He will remain for all eternity the symbol of a fighter who knew how to sacrifice himself for the people." The Russian president Vladimir Putin sent a condolence message to the Greek government, which included, inter alia, the following words: "To his Excellency, PM Kyriakos Mitsotakis. May you accept [my] deep condolences for the loss of Manolis Glezos, a brilliant political and social figure of Greece and a hero of the Greek Resistance at World War II. Manolis Glezos was a true friend of our country ... He [also] greatly contributed, in person, in the struggle against the distortion of history. ... With honour, Vladimir Putin. Moscow Kremlin, April 1st, 2020". His funeral was held in the First Cemetery of Athens, in public expense on April 1, with only his family present, due to the restrictions for the COVID-19 pandemic.

== Publications ==
Glezos wrote articles in Greek newspapers since 1942 and was the editor of the newspapers Rizospastis and I Avgi in the 1950s. He was awarded the International Award of Journalism in 1958, the Golden Medal Joliot-Curie of the World Peace Council in 1959, and the Lenin Peace Prize in 1963. He published six books in Greek:

- The History of the Book (Η ιστορία του βιβλίου, 1974)
- From Dictatorship to Democracy (Από τη Δικτατορία στη ∆ημοκρατία, 1974)
- The Phenomenon of Alienation in the Language (Το φαινόμενο της αλλοτρίωσης στη γλώσσα, 1977)
- The Conscience of the Rocky Earth, (Η συνείδηση της πετραίας γης, 1997)
- Hydor, Aura, Nero, (Ύδωρ, Αύρα, Νερό, 2001)
- National Resistance 1940-1945, (Εθνική Αντίσταση 1940-1945, 2006)
