= Filoti =

Filoti Φιλώτι
- Community
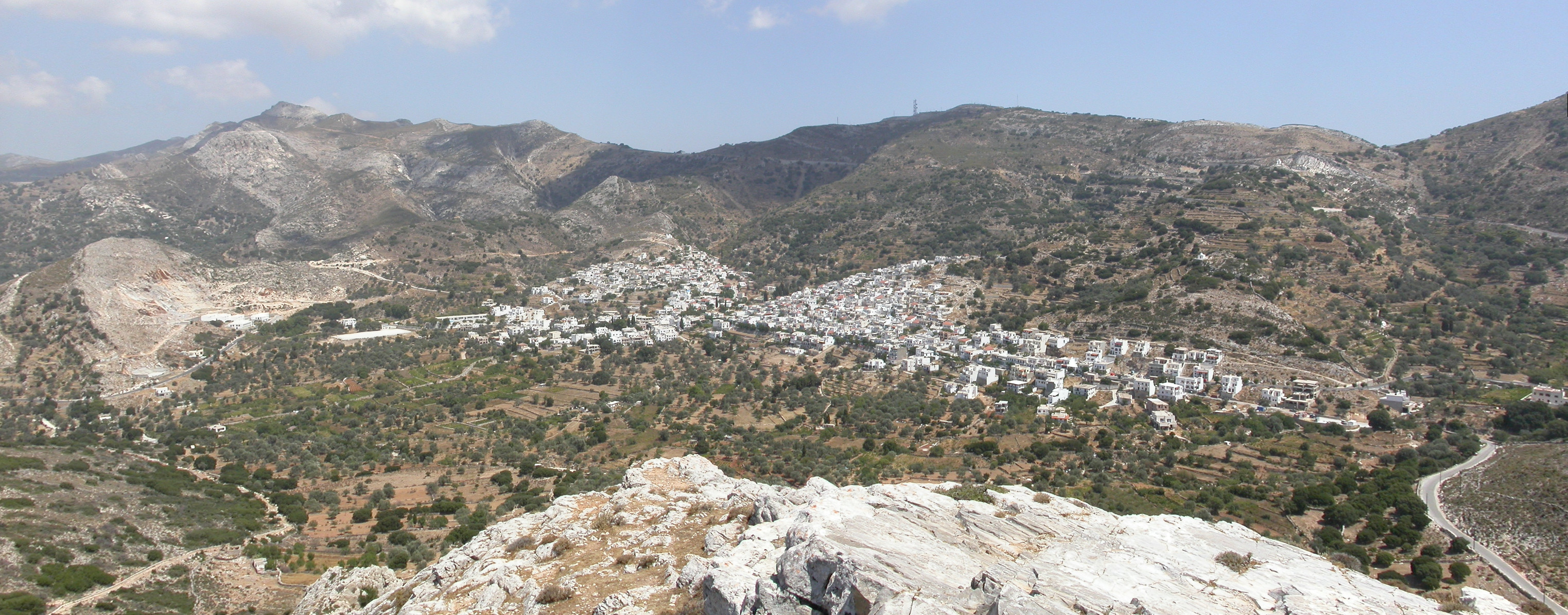

- Location within Greece
- Coordinates: 37°03′07″N 25°29′54″E
- Country: Greece
- Administrative region: South Aegean
- Regional unit: Naxos
- Municipality: Naxos and Lesser Cyclades
- Municipal unit: Drymalia
- Elevation: 400 m (1,300 ft)

Population (2021)
  - Community: 1,617
- Time zone: UTC+2 (EET)
  - Summer (DST): UTC+3 (EEST)
- Postal code: 84300
- Area code: 22850
- Website: https://e-filoti.blogspot.gr/

Filoti (in Greek: Φιλώτι or Φιλότι; officially: Φιλότιον) is a semi-mountainous village of central Naxos, Greece, with a population of 1,617 residents (census 2021), located at the foot of Mt. Zas (1,001 m), at an altitude of 400 meters, about 18.2 kilometres (11.3 mi) from the city of Naxos. It is located on the slopes of two hills and consists of three settlements, Rachidi, Klefaros and Lioiri. Its stand out is the Orthodox church of Panagia Filotitissa that is dedicated to the Assumption of the Virgin, a basilica built in 1718 in the place of an old Byzantine church. The economy of the village is mainly based on livestock products, secondarily in agriculture and tourism. It has a Primary School (since 1838), a Professional High School, a Multipurpose Regional Doctor, a Citizen Service Center (KEP), a Post office, a dentist and a pharmacy.

Together with Kalandos (pop. 10), constitutes the Municipal Community of Filoti (pop. 1487), which belongs to the municipal unit of Drymalia, of the municipality of Naxos and Lesser Cyclades, of the regional unit of Naxos (of the former county of Cyclades), in the administrative region South Aegean, Greece.

== First image ==
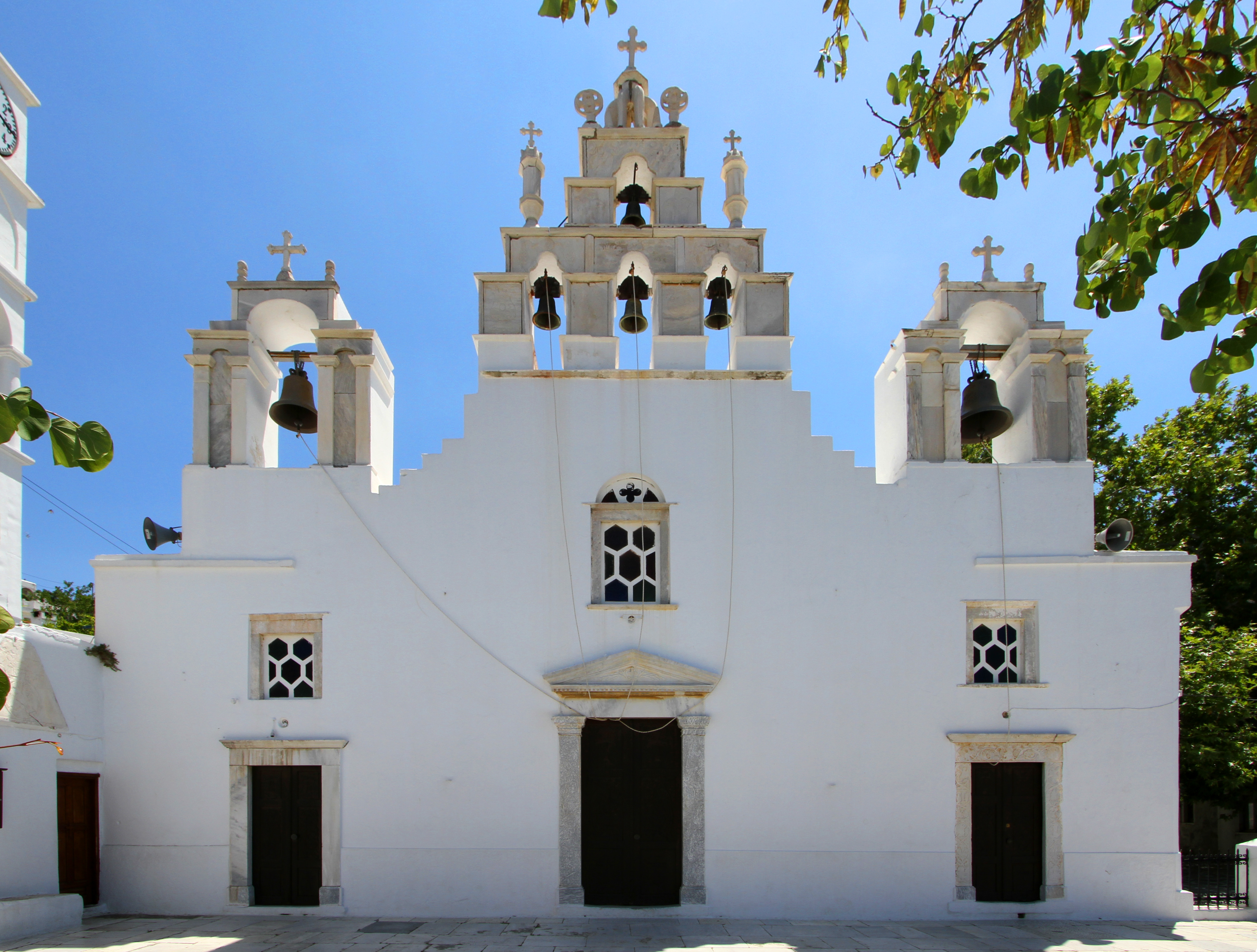
Panagia Filotitissa

The first image of the visitor approaching the village from the main motorway is impressive because it is built amphitheatrically on two hills. To the left is the settlement of Klepharos and to the right of Rachidi. The latest settlement of Lioiri does not seem because have been developed on a flat site opposite the other settlements and is so called because it was once an olive grove. (Note: "Olive grove" in Greek is written "λιοΐρι", that is loosely rendered "Lioiri" in English.) The next one you meet is the square of the village, dominated by a hundred-year-old plane-tree (since 1912). The square is called Gefira (in English means "bridge", because many years ago there was a bridge and a stream with waters that ran from the fountains of Kalamos and Agia Irini. Then, there was a watermill fed by a cistern, the remains of which are still preserved. Many years ago this area was not used as a square of the village, there were other places in the two settlements, most known were the historical square of Lachanario, located in the settlement of Klefaros and the squares of Agios Konstantinos and Fasola, located in the settlement of Rachidi. The interior of the two old settlements on the two hills is what more traditional one would expect from an old cycladic village, such as the large historic church of Panagia at Lakanario square, paved labyrinthine streets, arches and steasta (covered walkway). It has been classified since 1988 as a traditional settlement.

== Censuses ==
=== Historical population ===
All informations are from Hellenic Statistical Authority. Census of years 1835 to 1991 refers to de facto population, (Note: As a de facto population of a given place, the statistical office defines the total population found and registered in that particular place, irrespective of whether it resides permanently in that place, or whether it is temporary or passerby.) while 2001 to 2021 refers to permanent population.

Year	1835	1879	1889	1896	1907	1920	1928	1940	1951	1961	1971	1981	1991	2001	2011	2021
Population	1130	1541	1570	1753	1796	2122	2098	2073	1947	1669	1475	1474	1576	1503	1477	1617
References																

=== More information ===
- Census 2011. The municipal community extends to 92.79 km^{2}.
- Census 2001. The municipal apartment extended to 92.57 km^{2}.

The municipal community or apartment includes the settlements Filoti and coastal Kalandos (36°56′12.7″N 25°28′22.8″E). The municipal community of Filoti has the largest acreage in Naxos. In population comes second after the municipal community of Naxos where the city of Naxos (Chora) belongs. The village itself is the most populous village of the island.

== Administrative changes ==
- In 1835, with 1,130 inhabitants (291 families), it is annexed to the newly established Municipality of Apeiranthos of the province of Naxos, based in the settlement of Apeiranthos.
- In 1840, the ten municipalities of the province of Naxos are reduced to seven; and Filoti is detached from the municipality of Apeiranthos and annexed to the municipality of Tragaia, based in Chalkeio.
- In 1912, it is decided that settlements with more than 300 inhabitants and elementary school, to become autonomous communities. So the settlement of Filoti is being detached from the municipality of Tragaia, which is abolished and the community of Filoti is established which is based in the village of Filoti.
- In 1991, the census recognizes the settlement of Kalantos and is annexed to the community of Filoti.
- In 1997, with the implementation of the Kapodistrias reform (Law 2539/97), the settlement of Filoti is annexed to the newly established municipality of Drymalia, located in the settlement of Chalkeio.
- In 2010, with the implementation of the Kallikrates program (Law 3852/2010), Filoti settlement is annexed to the newly established municipality of Naxos and Lesser Cyclades.

Today, together with Kalandos (pop. 10), it constitutes the Municipal Community of Filoti (pop. 1487), which belongs to the municipal unit of Drymalia, of the municipality of Naxos and Lesser Cyclades, of the regional unit of Naxos (of the former prefecture of Cyclades), in the administrative region South Aegean.

== History ==
Near the village there is the Cave of Zas (37°2′6.6″N 25°29′53.5″E)[photo], where from the finds of excavations in the years 1985-6 and 1994 appears the cave to have a continuous human presence from the newer Neolithic period (4300-3200 BC). In the exact location of the present village settlements (Klepharos and Rachidi) no important archaeological finds have been revealed, but scattered fragments of black-figure potteries of the classical and Hellenistic period. It is probable that there will be a prehistoric cemetery west of the settlement of Rachidi, at Matouli position and a cemetery of historical times at the beginning of Rachidi near the central square and east of the motorway. The only evidence of the existence of an ancient settlement in today's place is its location for the following reasons:

- Natural fortification, because it is surrounded by mountain ranges that facilitate the monitoring of the area, giving the inhabitants time to abscond with their flocks in the mountains.
- Fertile area with abundant running waters at that time.
- It has always been the easiest and safest passage to move from one end of Naxos to the other. For passers-by it would be a safe resting place.

Apart from the cases it is known that in the Neolithic and Archaic period, the greatest activity is observed mainly in the coastal settlements (as in Grotta of Naxos town (37°6′30″N 25°22′33″E), Apollonas (37°10′46″N 25°32′59″E), Kastraki (37°00′18″N 25°23′17″E), Spedos (36°57′18″N 25°30′26″E), Panermos (36°57′40.6″N 25°32′5″E) and Kalantos) and less in mountainous.

=== Byzantine period ===
Filoti population is rising in the 7th to 10th centuries because of the abandonment of coastal settlements, from the fear of piratical raids, especially the Saracen pirates, which are based on Crete, drowning horror on the coasts of Naxos and the other Aegean islands. At the end of the early Byzantine period (500-650 AD) many churches were built in Naxos in the early Christian basilica architecture. It is estimated that at this time the earlier and small church of the Virgin Mary of Filotitissa was built. In the following years, the Byzantine Empire slowly diminishes, and turmoil and uncertainty prevail throughout the island.

=== Frankish period ===
In 1207 the Venetian Marco I Sanudo occupies Naxos and begins the oppressive Venetian feudalism. Sanudo divides the island into 56 fiefs; in the most fertile areas he instated his own people, forcing the natives to cultivate the occupations of the conquerors as serfs or to exploit barren and mountainous lands. Within these 56 fiefs we have a clear reference to a fief with the name "Filotis" (in Greek: «Φιλότης»). Several written reports during the Frankish rule show that Filoti, with his region, was one of the most important feuds. Around 1344, the Turkish pirates destroyed the neighboring settlement of Aria, but Filoti is rescued, where the survivors were moved. Prior to the destruction of Aria, Filoti numbered 200 residents and Argia 300.

=== Turkish domination ===
In 1537 the Turks occupy Naxos. The Venetians, although subjected and taxed by the Turks, continue to be the landowners of the island, but under the Ottoman administration. This seems to be convenient to Turks and Venetians as well. Turks exercise the administration and collect the taxes through the Venetians, who have a good knowledge of the place for many years. Venetians were compromised to obey Turks instead of their own rulers and to treat the natives as vassals like before. Filotians, like everyone on the island, are essentially in double possession and are starting to react. The first known rebellion of Naxos villagers against the seigniors, due to excessive taxation, is reported in 1641. It is a transitional period in which Turks, in order to appease the reactions of the Orthodox population, begin to restrict the privileges of Venetians and give more rights to the Naxians. Before the Turkish domination in Naxos (1537), the feudal fortunes were inherited or the Duke's consent needed to be transferred. After 1537, their fiefs and possessions were transferred as common estates. In 1621 the Ottoman regime established the institution of the Common (communities) (Note: Naxos was organized in three Communes, a) the Castle (where the Venetians lived), b) Bourgos (where the bourgeoisie lived) and c) the Villages Community. There is still a district called "Bourgos" in the city of Naxos.(37°6′26″N 25°22′34″E)) and Filoti belongs to the "Common of the Villages". With the institution of communities, Greeks are allowed to have community administration with elders, to take collective decisions and to submit them to the Turkish administration.

At this transitional period the Barozzi family takes over the fief of Filoti. In 1620, Zorzeto Barozzi bought a tower-like mansion in the center of the village, from a certain Tzuane Tagari, known since then as the "Barozzi Tower". Zorzeto Barozzi, was a groom and heir of the last Venetian duke of Naxos, Giacomo IV Crispo. He was succeeded by his son Jacob Barozzi, who was one of the most oppressive seignior of Filoti and held the fief from 1648 to 1676. Because the feudal privileges had begun to be lost, Jacob Barrotzi, trying to claim and secure his feudal fortune, collected documents from 1372 to 1667 and named the collection "My hegemony in Filoti". He came to occupy 71% of the land. He presented as his own property even the church of Panagia with the adjoining churches of Agia Paraskevi and Agios Ioannis, with the demand for rent for its use, as well as the right to appoint its priests. Although under the Ottoman administration, the seignior insisted on the tactics of the Venetian era and presented Filoti as his property.

In 1669, Filoti accepts refugees from Crete when it was captured by the Turks.

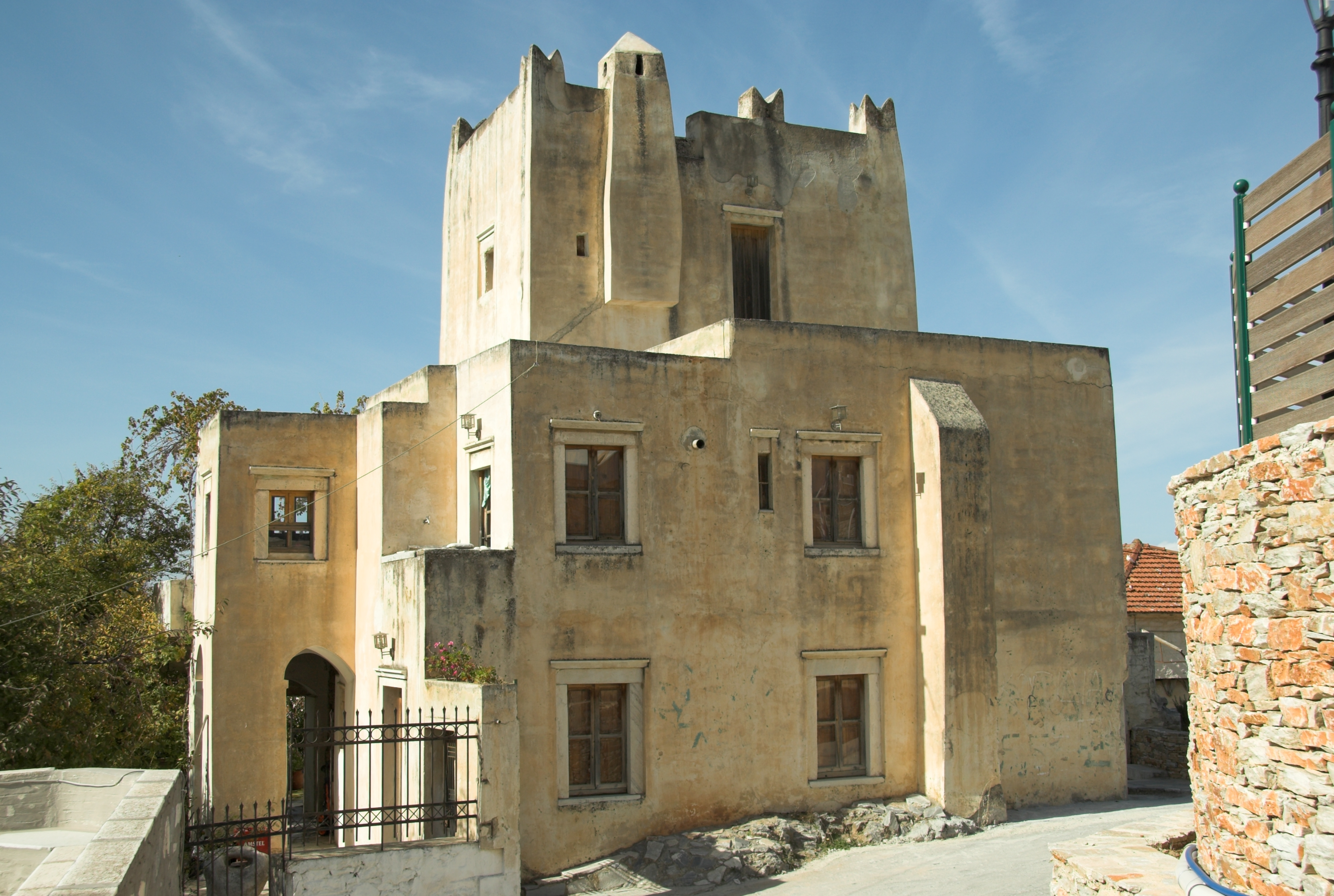
Barozzi's tower-like mansion

=== End of feudalism ===
Under these conditions, long-standing conflicts began between feudal and inhabitants, culminating in the 1680–1690 decade. Filotians demand in the place of the old Byzantine church of Panagia to build a new bigger one and ask for a part of the garden of the "Lachanario" – today's homonymous square in Klefaro – which belonged to the feudal lord. During this controversy, from 1676 to 1714, the son of Iakovos, Chrysanthos Barozzi, continued to be the same intransigent. The situation changed when Ιeronimo succeeded Chrysanthos (1717–1721), who was reconciled with the Filotians. In 1717 he granted not only part of the "Lachanario" to build the new church, but the whole to exist a square next to the church. (Note: 'Lachanario" square was one of the main squares of the village until the middle of the 20th century, when the "Gefira", the square on the motorway, began to grow.) The reconciliation seems to have been a one-way solution for feudal Ιeronimo Barozzi, because the Frankish rule had come to its end. In 1721 the privileges of the feudal lords were abolished and they were considered to be equal to the Naxians. In addition, since 1566 when the Ottoman rule had consolidated, Filotians were no longer villeins and because of Turkish occupation they could migrate for work anywhere in Turkey (as in Smyrna, Vourla and Constantinople). This created a shortage of workers and forced the feudal lords to grant greater benefits to have their estates cultivated, reaching the point of selling or giving up part of them. It is characteristic that in 1567 and 1621 with the requirement of the landowners had banned the massive migration. In addition, around 1690, the locals began to bring money from abroad and acquire their own properties, which reached up to Kalandos, Marathos, Archatos and Kampos.

=== Panagia Filotitissa ===
In 1718 the new church was founded, which was completed in 1806 and its inauguration took place on 15 August of the same year. There is the opinion that the inauguration took place in 1779, but the official ecclesiastical information mention 1806. The church, dedicated to the Assumption of the Virgin, is the symbol of Filotians in their long struggle against the feudal regime. Its celebration, which takes place on August 15, is the most important day of the year for the village.

=== New Hellenic State ===
After the liberation from the Ottoman domination, in 1833 Fragiskos Barrozzi donated space, opposite the church, to build the first elementary school of the village. The last heir of the feudal property, Michael Markopoulos, in 1917 sells the remaining estates and hand over to the Filotians the church of St. Nicholas, an old orthodox church in the settlement of Klefaros that had been transformed into a Catholic from the beginning of the Frankish occupation in 1207.

== Local products ==
The mineral wealth that Naxos was known since antiquity, like the marble and the emery of Naxos, are not in abundance at the area of Filoti. Traditionally the products of the place are agricultural and livestock farming. There is considerable sufficiency in figs, grapes, wine and mainly olives with very good quality olive oil. The most important production, due to the mountainous nature of the area, is the free-range sheep and goats and dairy products such as kefalotyri, anthotyro, xinotyro, touloumotiri, arsenico, mizithra and others. Of these, stands out the arsenico kefalotyri (in Greek: αρσενικό κεφαλοτύρι), that is made exclusively from sheep and goat milk and is usually collected in the sheepfolds or mitatos.

== Celebrations - Traditions ==
- The most important celebration of the village is the 15th of August due to the historic church of Panagia Filotitissa. It is a three-day celebration with many religious and recreational events.
- The ancient custom of Chirosfagia (in Greek: Χοιροσφαγία (Note: The Greek word "χοιροσφαγία" is complex, i.e. "χοίρος" (in English: "pig") and "σφαγή" (in English: slaughter).)) in Tsiknopempti accompanied by various carnival events. Since the old days it has been customary for every family to breed a pig all the year to slaughter it almost ritually this day. Its meat was then processed in various ways so that it would be available for many months. The custom is mainly observed in the mountainous villages of Naxos during the carnival. In other islands of the Aegean (such as Andros, Tinos) is celebrated in other seasons of the year.

== Infrastructures ==
=== Education ===
- Elementary School. For historical reasons, let us mention that the first elementary school was the "Male School of Filoti", founded in 1838.
- Professional High School. The building complex houses modern classrooms and workshops. Indicatively, the educational sectors that operated for the school year 2016–2017 were:
  1. Information Technology
  2. Engineering
  3. Electrical Engineering, Electronics and Automation
  4. Structural works, Structured Environment and Architectural Design
  5. Management and Economy
  6. Agriculture, Food and the Environment
  7. Health Care and Wellness
- Special Vocational Secondary and Lyceum School of Naxos. It started to work in the school year 2007–2008. It covers the following sections and specializations:
  1. Agriculture, Food and Nutrition Technology with specialty: Floriculturist and Landscape Architect.
  2. Electrical Engineering, Electronics and Automation with specialty: Electrical Systems, Installations and Networks Technician.
  3. Mechanical Engineering with specialization: Technical Engineer of Thermal Installations and Engineer of Oil and Natural Gas Technology.

=== Health ===
- Multipurpose Regional Doctor, which belongs to the General Hospital - Health Center of Naxos and has two rural doctors.
- Dental surgery.
- Pharmacy.

=== Other ===
- Citizen Service Center (KEP) for the service of the citizens of the municipal unit of Drymalia.
- Post Office and Courier Services.

== Culture - Sports ==
There is intense cultural and athletic activity in the village. It has:

- The "Cultural Centre of the Filoti Association", where various events (speeches, various exhibitions, etc.) are often hosted (37°03′9.2″N 25°29′51.2″E). The "Filoti Association", among others, has a keen activity in maintaining traditions and customs.
- Lending library, founded in 2005, with a donation of 4,500 volumes and books by the former Minister, Mr. George Anomeritis, personal offer to his father's place of origin, which is constantly enriched. Under the auspices of the Library and the Cultural Center, there is a "Cinema Club" and a "Book Reading Club", in which writers and poets are invited to discuss their books and selected movies are shown for both children and adults.
- It has the theater named "Manolis Iac. Psarras" suitable for sports and mainly artistic events (37°03′21″N 25°29′35″E).
- Women's Association of Filoti "Panagia Filotitissa", which is housed in the old olive press of the church (37°03′9.3″N 25°29′55.2″E) and among other things, is activated in the production of local traditional products such as spoon sweets.
- Museum of Greek Coins "Nikola Moustaki", hosted in a building renovated for this purpose (37°02′58.5″N 25°29′47.9″E). Exposed coins and banknotes that were released in recent years in Greece and Cyprus, as well as replicas of ancient coins.
- In the alleys of "Fasola" square, which was formerly a neighborhood of professionals, two shops have been appropriately designed to accommodate a "traditional barber shop" and a "traditional blacksmith", as they were many decades ago.
- Since 1952, the Athletic Educational Association of Filoti, "Zeus", has been established, which maintains among others a football team with its own stadium and seat at the entrance of the village (37°03′20.6″N 25°29′46.9″E), as well as track and volleyball divisions.

== Gallery ==
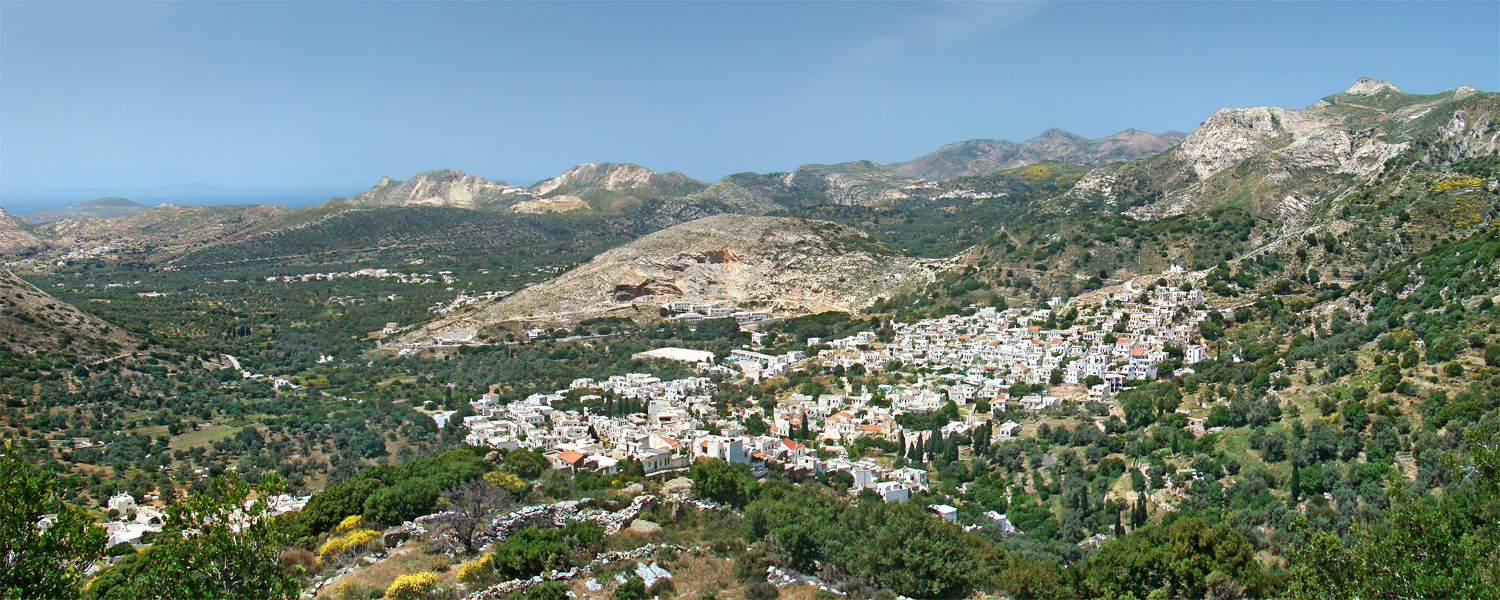

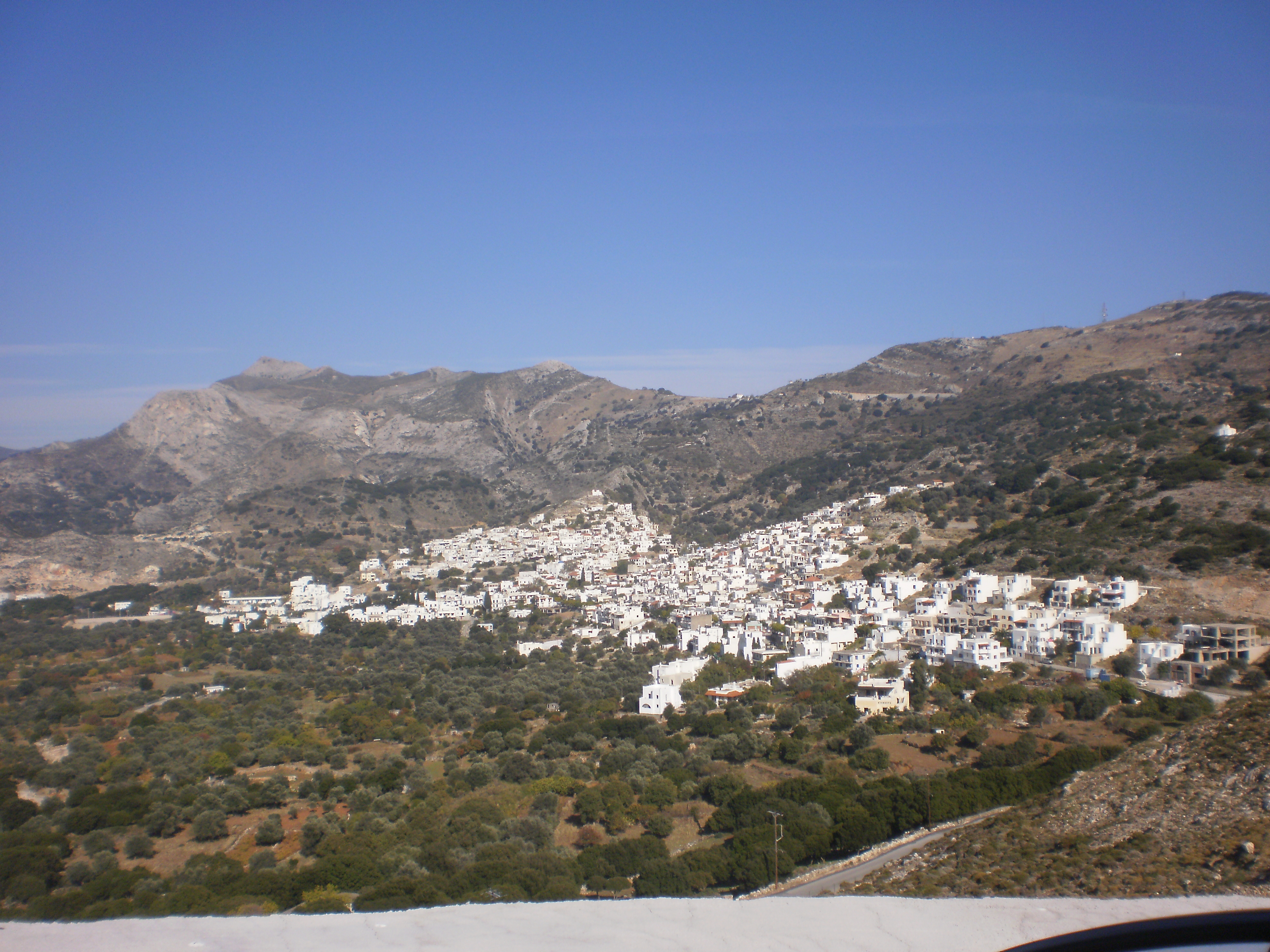

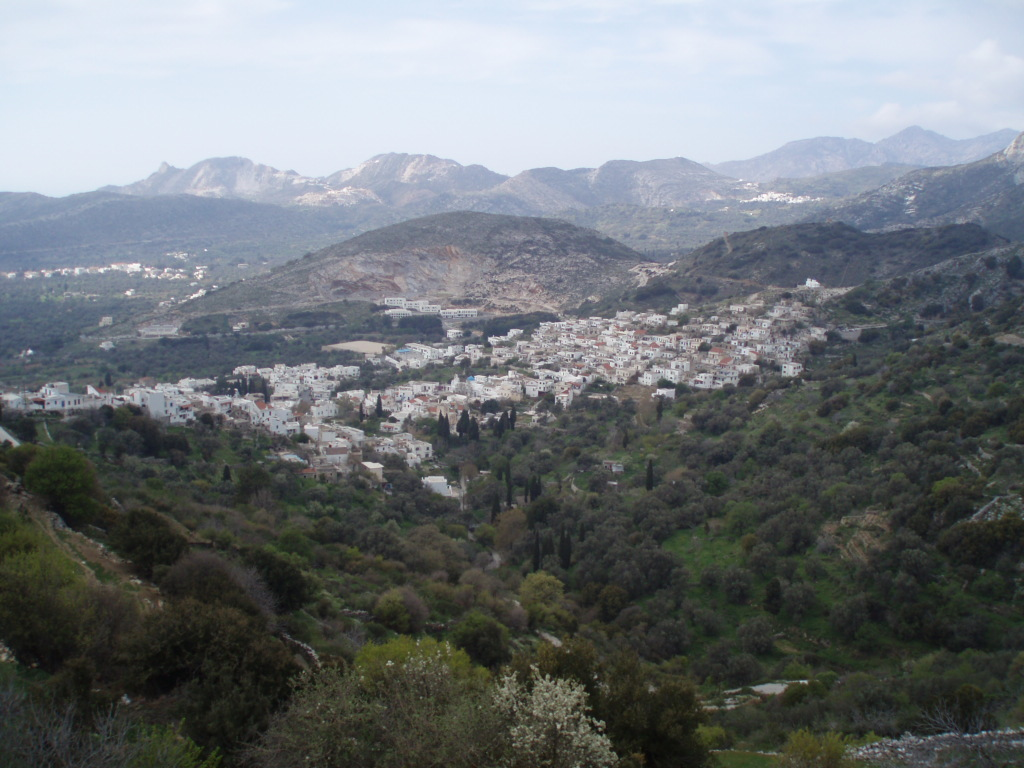

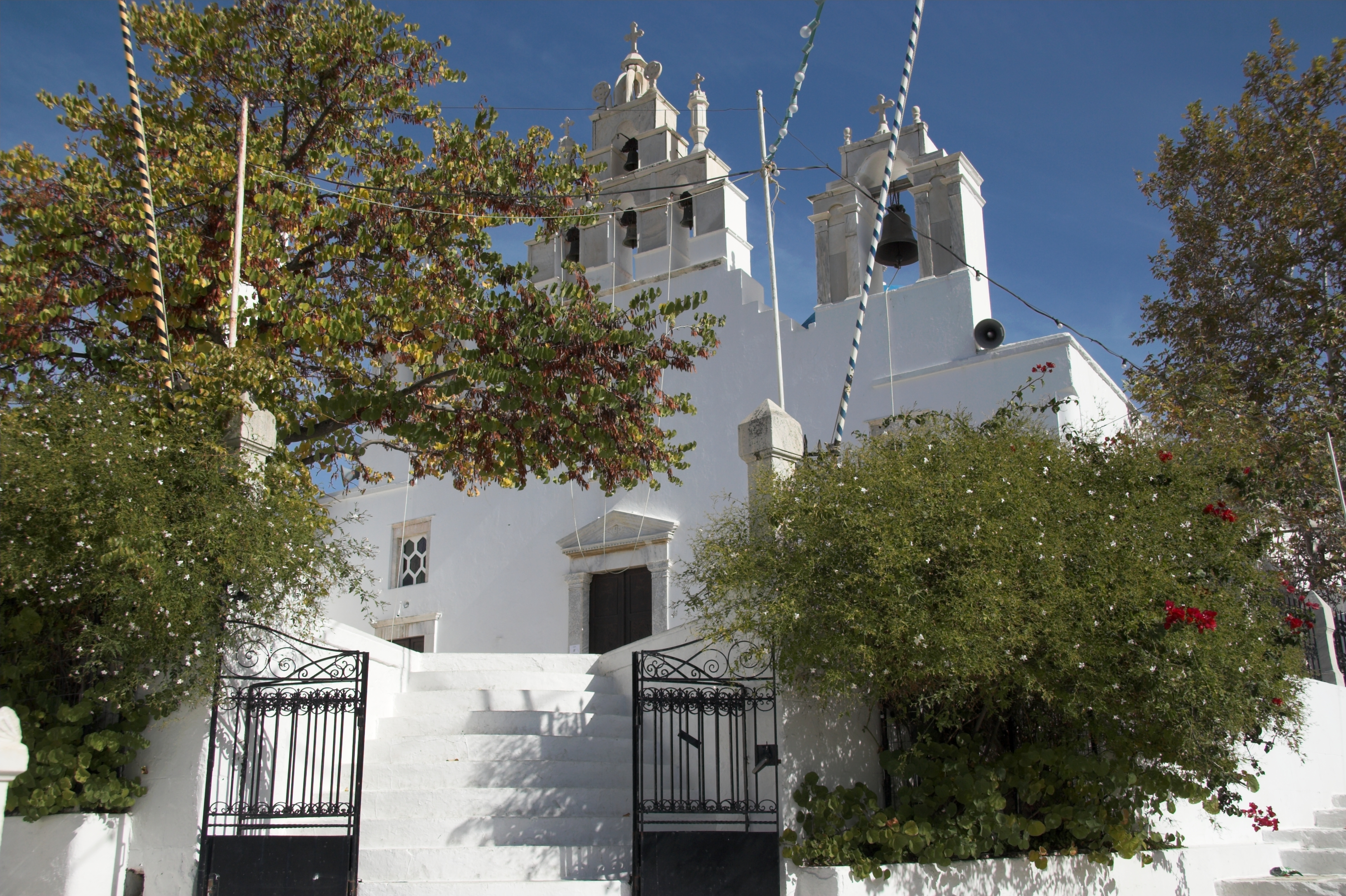

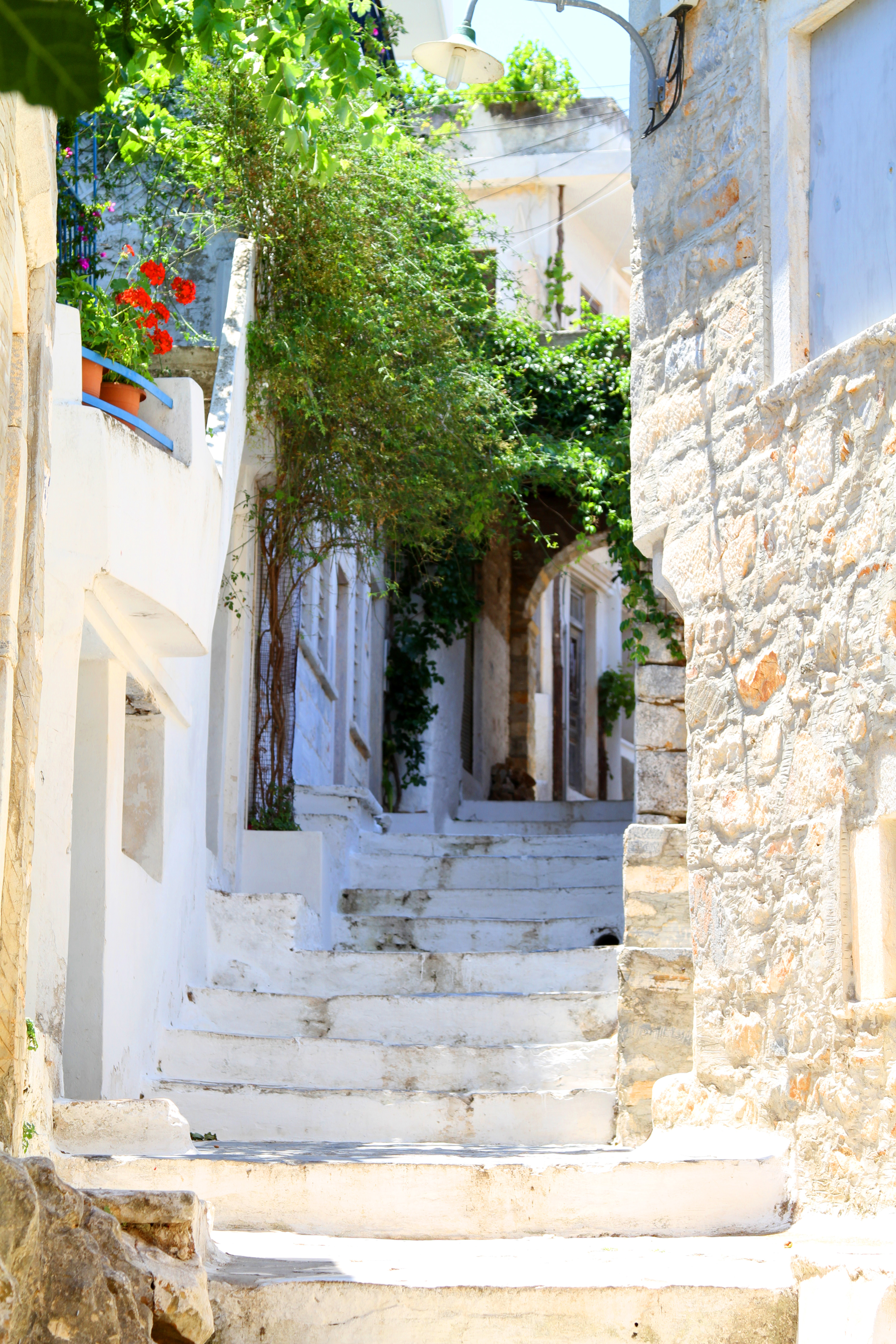

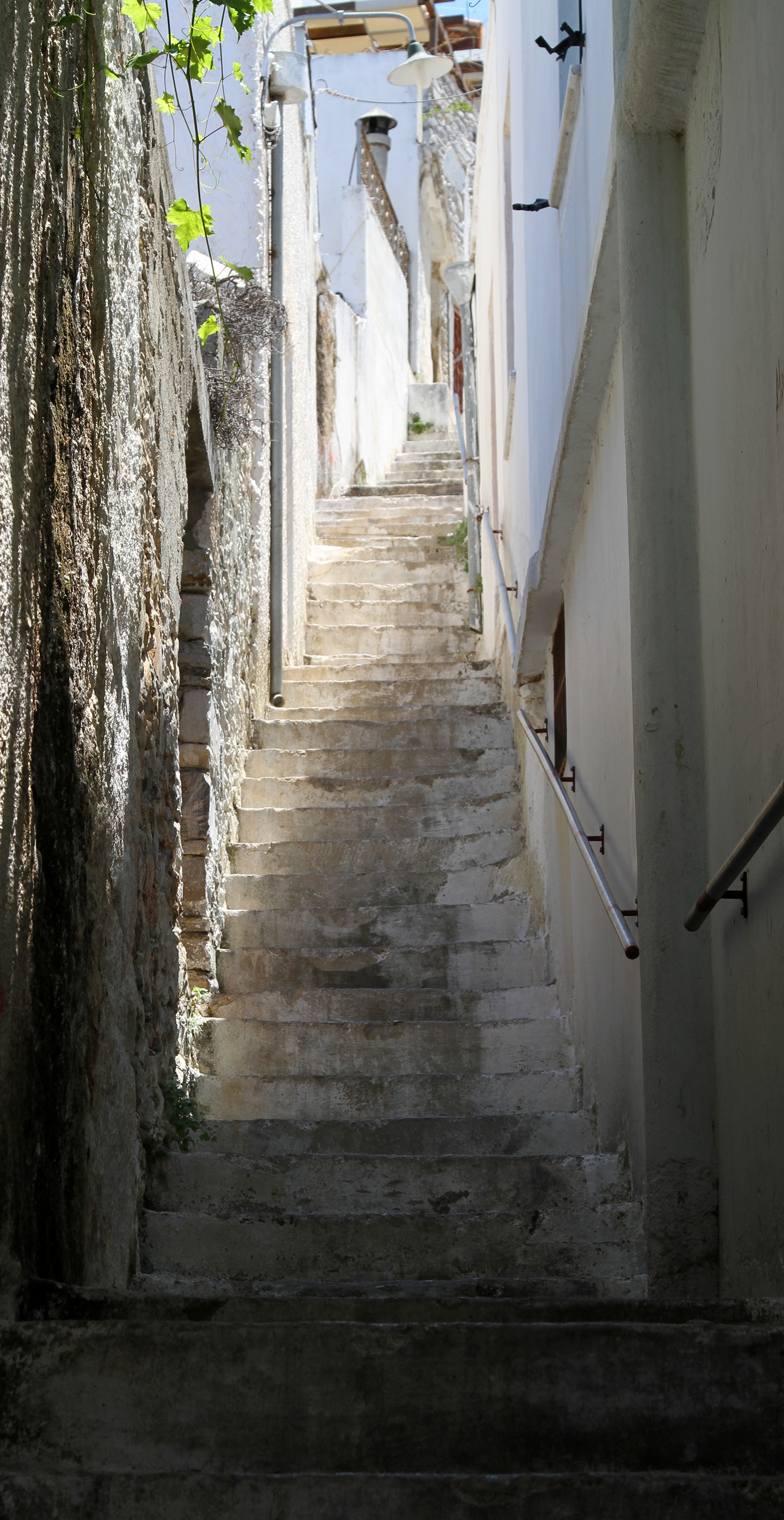

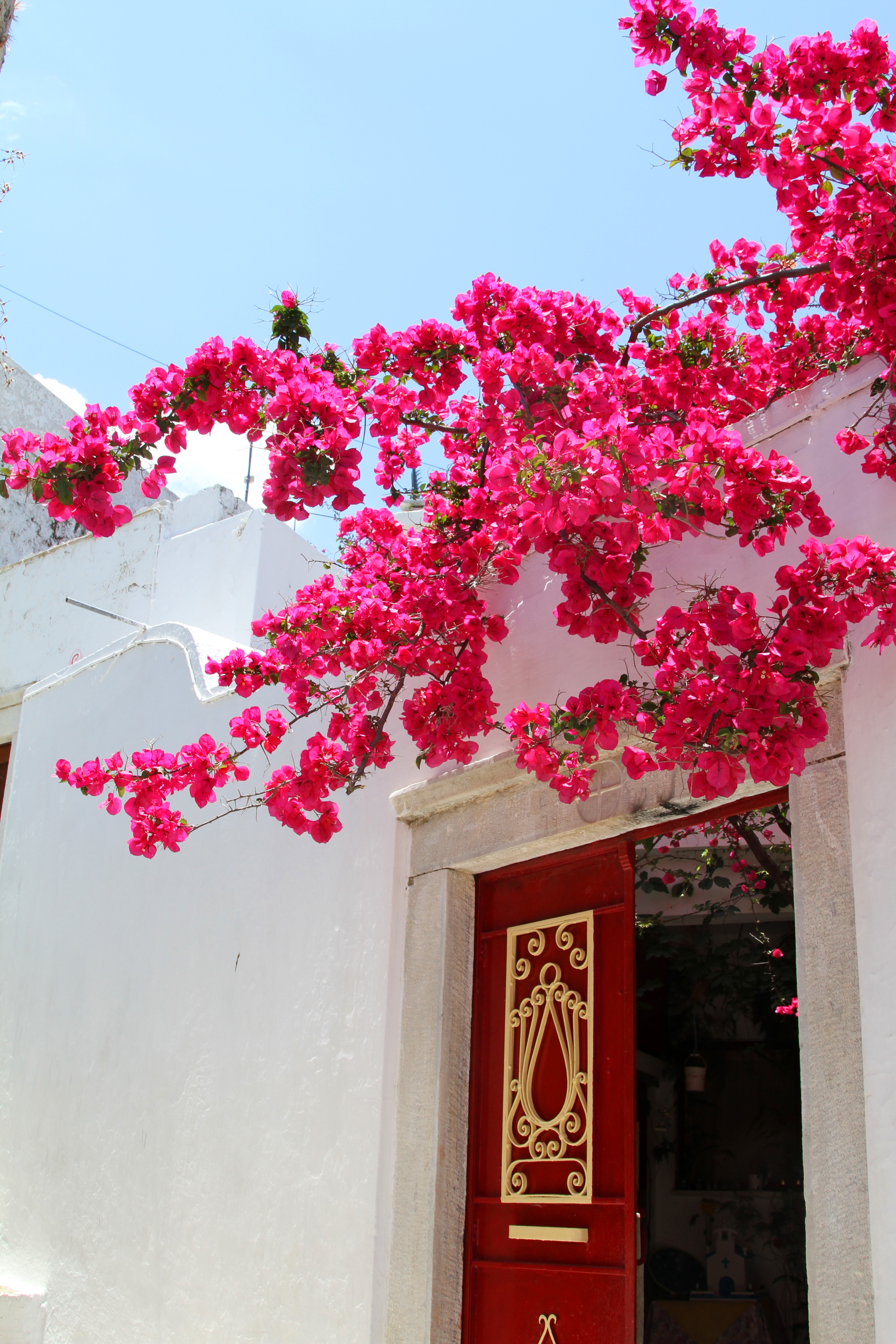

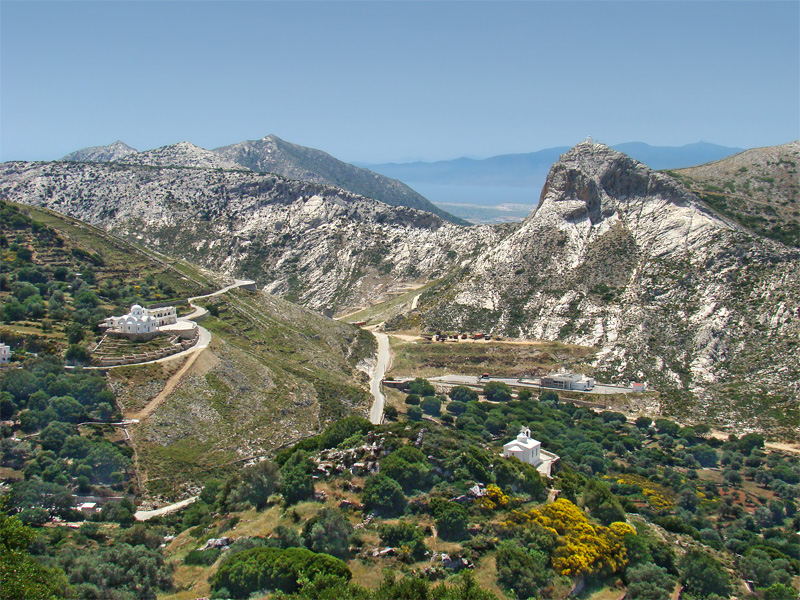

== Βibliography ==
- (in Greek) Stamatelos, Michalis. Vamva-Stamatelos, Fotini. "Ελληνική Γεωγραφική Εγκυκλοπαίδεια", Τεγόπουλος-Μανιατέας.
- (in Greek) Tziotis, Antonis. (Athens 2006). "ΦΙΛΩΤΙ ΝΑΞΟΥ". ISBN 960-89111-3-3
- (in Greek) Isaias, Ioannis (Athens 2012). Το Φιλώτι και το ιστορικό εκκλησιαστικό μνημείο της Παναγίας της Φιλωτίτισσας. ISBN 978-960-93-3648-2
- Nakamura, Yoshikazu. (July 1979)."Some Greek Folk Songs of an Aegean Island Naxos" από Hitotsubashi University Repository. Archived 2017-08-08. Retrieved 2018-12-15. Yoshikazu Nakamura is a professor at the Hitotsubashi University in Tokyo, Japan. In late 1977, he had been doing folklore research in mountainous Naxos, living in Filoti.
