= Apostolos Santas =

Greek Resistance fighter during the Axis occupation in WWII

Apostolos Santas (Greek: Απόστολος Σάντας; 22 February 1922 – 30 April 2011), commonly known as Lakis, was a Greek veteran of the Resistance against the Axis occupation of Greece during World War II, most notable for his participation, along with Manolis Glezos, in the taking down of the Nazi flag from the Acropolis on 30 May 1941.

== Biography ==
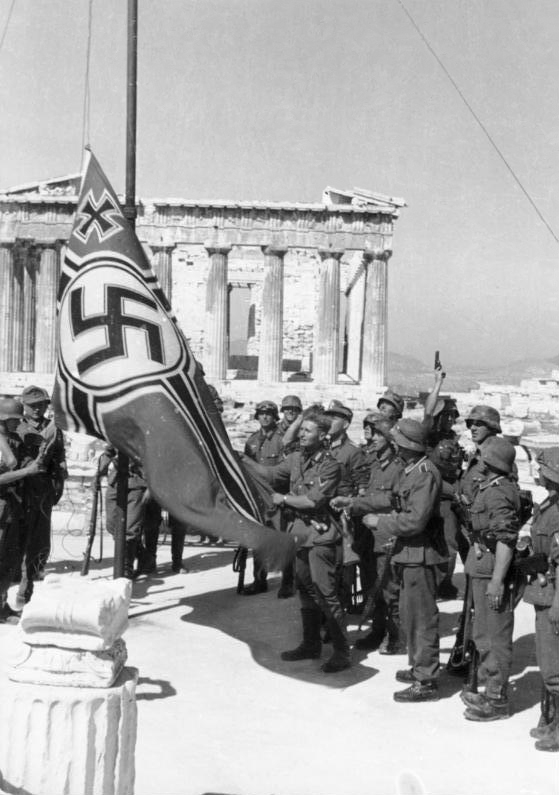
The German War Flag being raised on the Acropolis of Athens, April 1941

Apostolos Santas was born in 1922 in Patra, while his roots were from the Ionian island of Lefkada. His family moved to Athens in 1934. He completed his secondary education in Athens and was accepted to the law school of the University of Athens, completing his law studies after the liberation of the country from Nazi occupation in 1944. On the night of 30 May 1941, he and Manolis Glezos climbed on the Acropolis of Athens and tore down the Nazi flag, which had been there since 27 April, when the Nazi forces had entered and occupied Athens, leaving the flagpole empty. That was one of the first resistance acts in Greece. The act inspired the Greeks to resist occupation, and made the two into folk heroes. The Germans responded by sentencing Glezos and Santas to death in absentia.

In 1942, he joined the fledgling National Liberation Front (EAM), and a year later the guerrilla force ELAS, with which he participated in several battles against the Axis troops throughout Central Greece.

After the Occupation, because of his leftist beliefs, he was sent into internal exile to Ikaria in 1946, then to Psyttaleia in 1947 and finally to the Makronisos island in 1948. He managed to escape to Italy, from where he went to Canada where he was granted political asylum. He lived in Canada until 1962, when he returned to Greece, where he spent the rest of his life. On 30 April 2011 he died in Athens, aged 89. Santas received numerous awards from various institutions in Greece and other Allied countries.
