= Mount Zas =

Mountain in Greece

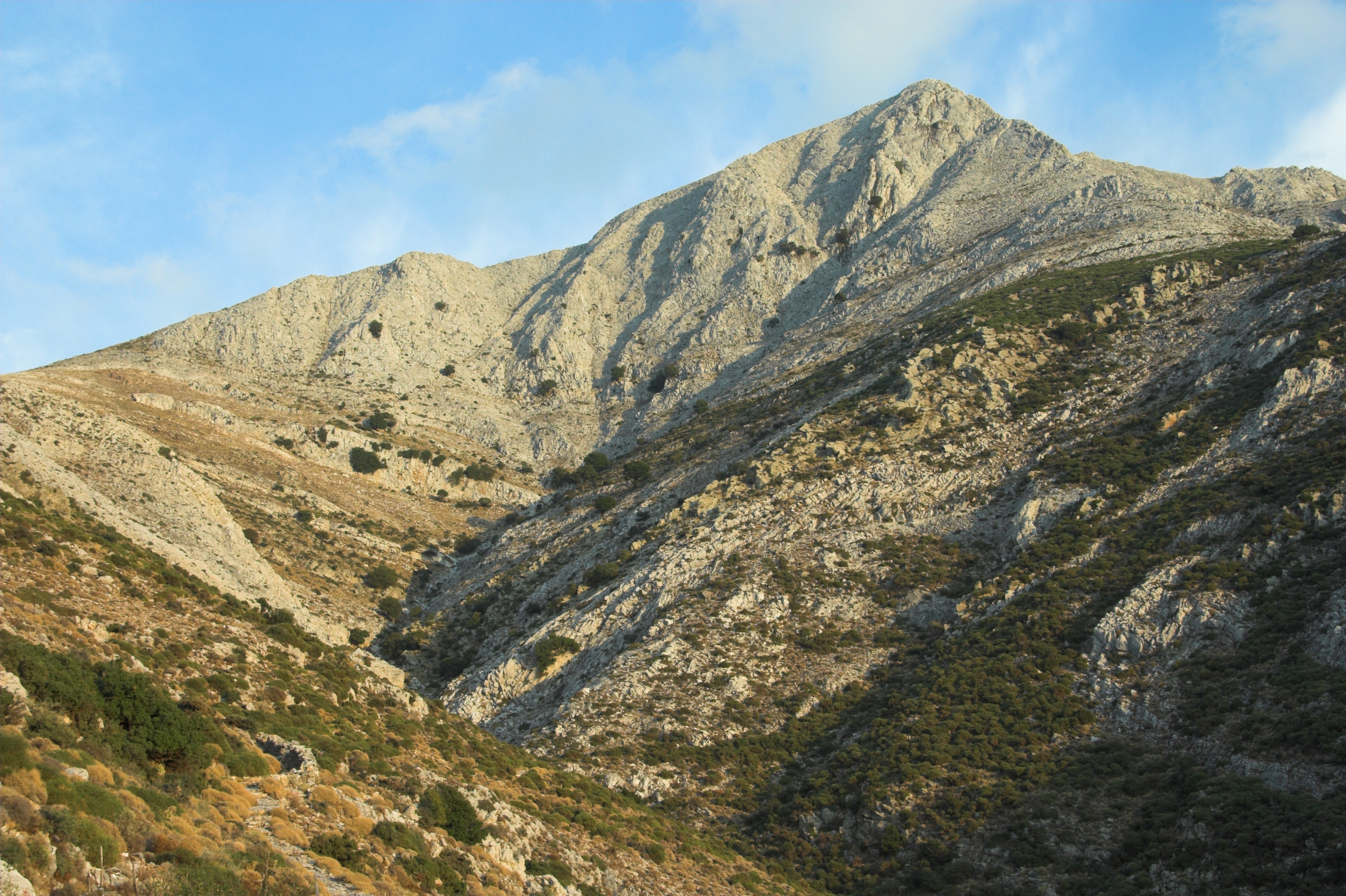
- Mount Zas as seen from the Aria Spring (northwest)

Highest point
- Elevation: 1,001 m (3,284 ft)
- Prominence: 1,001 m (3,284 ft)
- Coordinates: 37°1′50″N 25°30′8″E

Geography
- Location within Greece
- Location: Island of Naxos, Greece

Climbing
- Easiest route: Hike

Mount Zas (Ζας Modern Greek: [ˈzas]), also known as Mount Zeus, is a mountain on the Greek island of Naxos. With a summit of 1,001 m (3,284 ft) above sea level, it is the highest peak in the Cyclades.

The mountain is named after the Greek deity Zeus, with whom its modern name is a cognate.

== Description ==
The mountain overlooks the town of Filoti. Around 628 m (2,060 ft) up the mountain's western slope is Zeus's cave, famous for its connection with the Greek deity Zeus.

There are two main routes to the summit, the easiest of which begins at the Agia Marina chapel. A second, more difficult route, begins at the nearby Aria Spring and passes Zeus's cave.

== Mythology ==
The mountain is associated with the Greek deity Zeus, who is said to have spent his childhood there after being taken from the Ideon Antron cave on Crete.

An ancient rock carving found near the cave on the mountain reads "Zeus Melosios," referring to Zeus as the protector of the sheep.

== Nearest places ==
- Filoti, north
- Town of Naxos, west
