= Agathosthenes =

Ancient Greek writer and philosopher

Agathosthenes (Ἀγαθοσθένης) was a Greek historian or philosopher of uncertain date, who is referred to by Tzetzes as his authority in matters connected with geography. There is mention of a work of Agathosthenes called "Asiatica Carmina", where some writers read the name "Aglaosthenes"; for Aglaosthenes or Aglosthenes, who is by some considered to be the same as Agathosthenes, wrote a work on the history of Naxos, of which nothing remains, but which was much used by ancient writers.
