= Apeiranthos =

Village in Naxos, Greece

Apeiranthos Απείρανθος
- Community
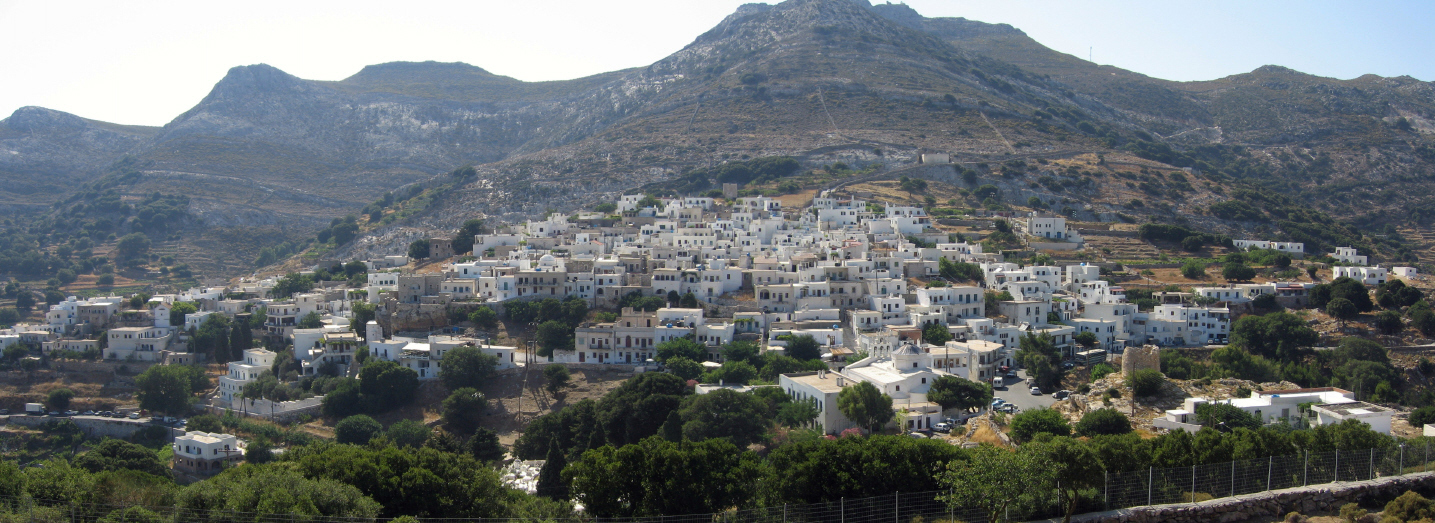
- Panoramic view of Apeiranthos from the East

- Location within Greece
- Coordinates: 37°04′20″N 25°31′20″E
- Country: Greece
- Administrative region: South Aegean
- Regional unit: Naxos
- Municipality: Drymalia

Population (2021)
  - Community: 773
- Time zone: UTC+2 (EET)
  - Summer (DST): UTC+3 (EEST)

Apeiranthos or Aperathos (Greek: Απείρανθος or Απέραθος; local dialect: Απεράθου, Aperáthou) is a mountainous village on the island of Naxos in Greece. It is located 28 km (17 mi) north-east of the capital of the island, built on the foothill of mountain Fanari, on an altitude between 650 and 700 m. The similarities of the local dialect and traditions to those of mountainous Cretan villages has led some historians to the conclusion that Apeiranthos was built by Cretans during the 10th century. The first historical evidence regarding the existence of the village goes back to 1420, on a reference by the Italian traveler Cristoforo Buondelmonti on his book Liber insularum archipelagi (The Book of the Islands of the Archipelago).

The village has four museums: the Archaeological Museum of Apeiranthos, the Museum of Folk Art, the Geological Museum, and the Museum of Natural History. With a population of 722 (2011 census), the village is the second largest on the island after Filoti.

== Notable people ==
- Manolis Glezos (1922–2020), politician and writer
- Petros Protopapadakis (1854–1922), Prime Minister of Greece
- Michalis Vardanis (1936–2014), Army officer

== Natural History Museum ==
Caretta caretta. Apeiranthos Natural History Museum

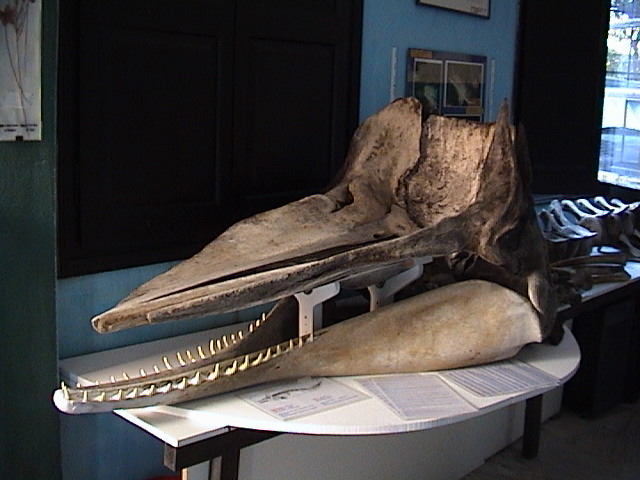
Physeter macrocephalus. Apeiranthos Natural History Museum

Monachus monachus. Apeiranthos Natural History Museum

Tursiops truncatus. Apeiranthos Natural History Museum
